= James Edwin Williams =

British trade unionist

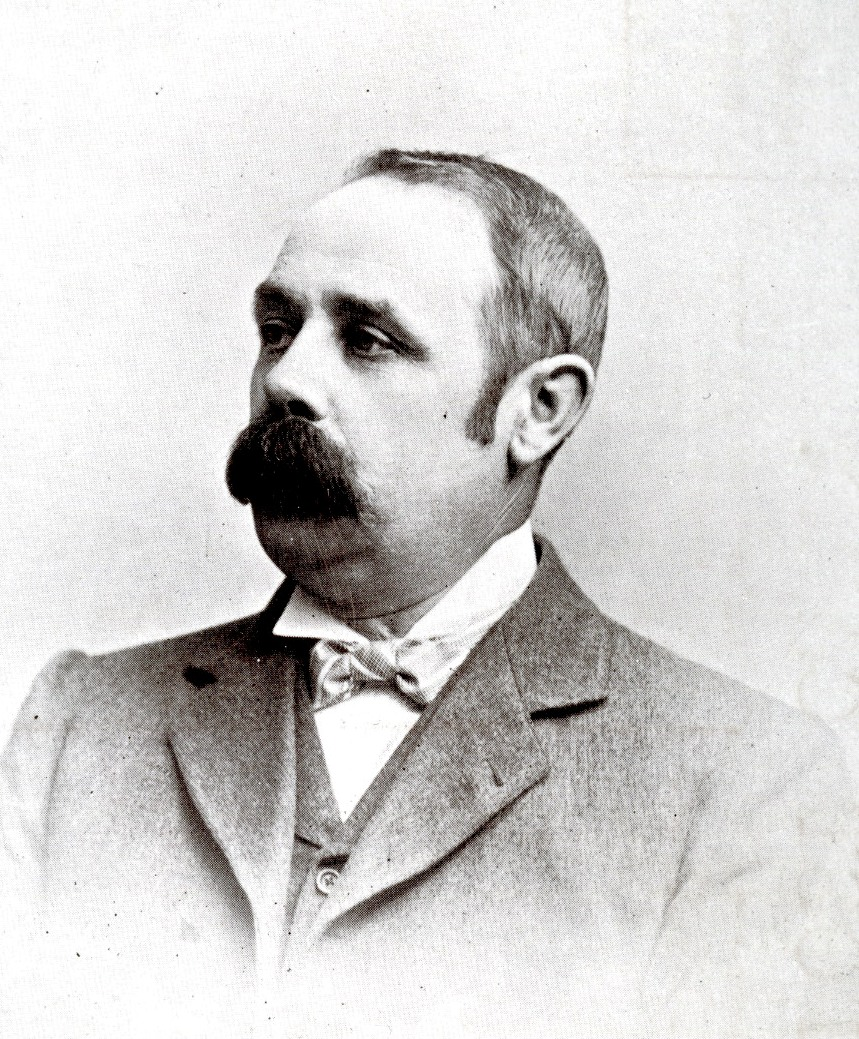
James Edwin Williams

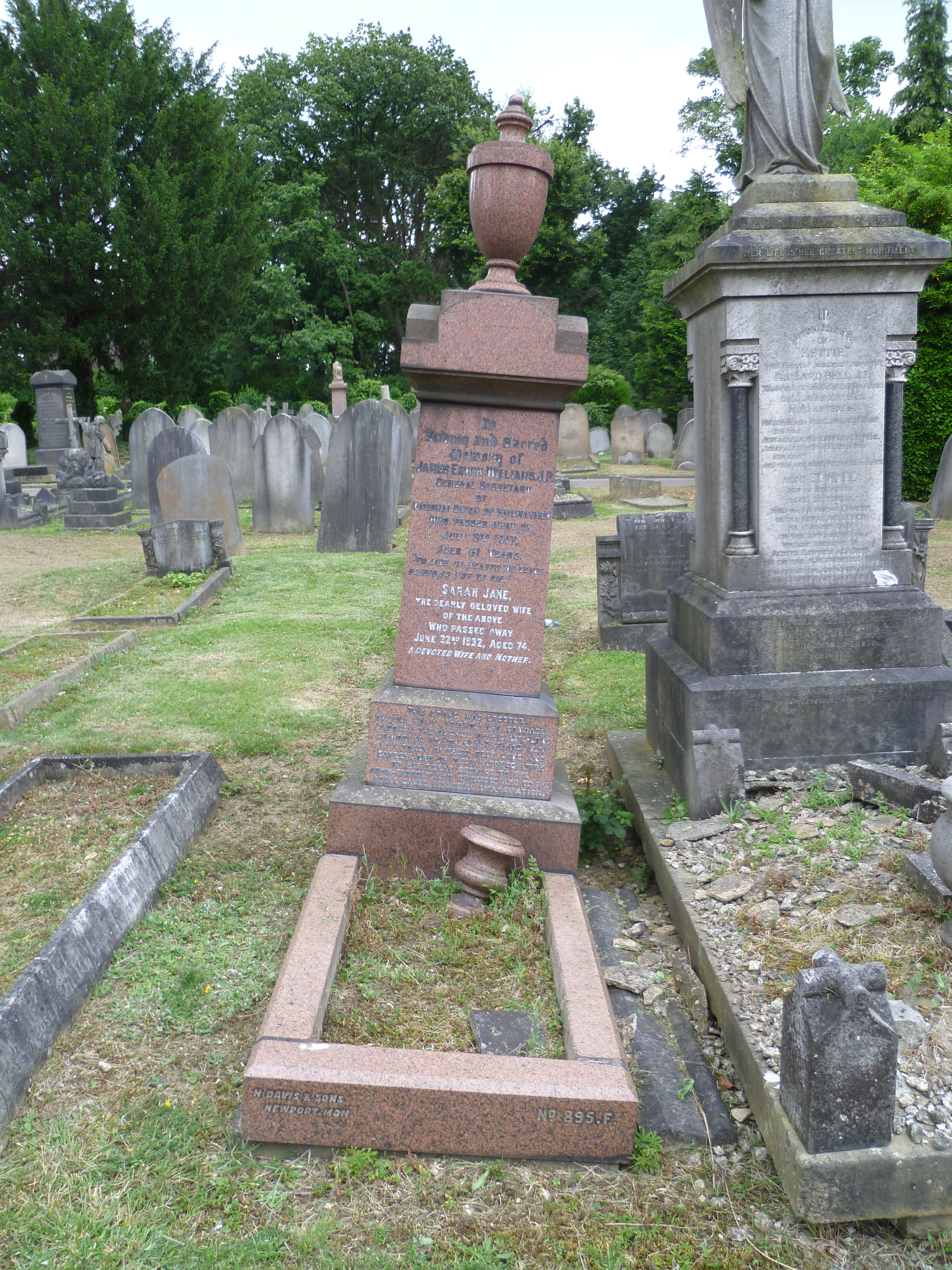
Williams' grave at Southgate Cemetery.

James Edwin Williams (1856 – 3 July 1917) was a British trade unionist.

== Life and career ==
Born in Gloucester, Williams began working for the Great Western Railway in 1874, based in Pontypool, also joining the Amalgamated Society of Railway Servants (ASRS). Three years later, he suffered a serious accident while at work, forcing him to leave the industry, but he remained active in the ASRS, and also in local politics, being elected to the local Board of Guardians in 1893.

In 1897, Williams was appointed as secretary of the Pontypool branch of the ASRS, then three years later as the union's assistant general secretary and financial secretary. In 1910, he was elected as the union's general secretary, leading the union through the major strike of 1911, then organising a merger with the General Railway Workers' Union and the United Pointsmen and Signalmen's Society. Completed in 1913, this merger formed the National Union of Railwaymen, and Williams was selected as its first general secretary, until his retirement in 1916.

Williams also served on the Parliamentary Committee of the Trades Union Congress, from 1910, and was a justice of the peace. He is buried in Southgate Cemetery along with his wife Sarah Jane (died 22 June 1932).

Williams' son, Arthur James Williams, also became a leading figure in the NUR, and served as Lord Mayor of Cardiff.

Trade union offices
| Preceded by Edward Garrity | Assistant Secretary of the Amalgamated Society of Railway Servants; 1902–1910 | Succeeded by J. H. Thomas |
| Preceded by Richard Bell | General Secretary of the Amalgamated Society of Railway Servants; 1910–1913 | Succeeded by Position abolished |
| Preceded by New position | General Secretary of the National Union of Railwaymen; 1913–1916 | Succeeded by J. H. Thomas |
