= National Union of Railwaymen =

Trade union of railway workers in the United Kingdom

- Merged into: National Union of Rail, Maritime and Transport Workers
- Founded: 29 March 1913; 113 years ago
- Dissolved: 1990
- Headquarters: Unity House, Euston Road, London
- Location: United Kingdom
- Members: 408,900 (1945)
- Publication: Transport Review
- Affiliations: TUC, Labour

The National Union of Railwaymen was a trade union of railway workers in the United Kingdom. The largest railway workers' union in the country, it was influential in the national trade union movement.

== History ==
The NUR was an industrial union founded in 1913 by the merger of the Amalgamated Society of Railway Servants (founded 1872), the United Pointsmen and Signalmen's Society (founded 1880) and the General Railway Workers' Union (founded 1889).

The NUR represented the majority of railway workers, but not white-collar workers, who were members of the Railway Clerks' Association (founded 1897, later the Transport Salaried Staffs' Association). NUR membership was open to drivers and firemen but most chose instead to be members of the Associated Society of Locomotive Engineers and Firemen (founded 1880).

In 1914 the NUR joined forces with the National Transport Workers' Federation and Mining Federation of Great Britain to form the Triple Alliance – perhaps an unfortunate name, as the same year the Triple Entente of Britain, France and Russia and the Triple Alliance of Germany, and Austria-Hungary (albeit without Italy) went to war.

In 1919 the NUR and ASLEF jointly organised the 1919 United Kingdom railway strike, which prevented a proposed wage reduction and won an eight-hour maximum working day. The NUR formed Federation agreements with ASLEF in 1903 and 1982 but both were short-lived.

The NUR had 408,900 members in 1945, making it the fifth largest union in Britain. Its membership fell to 369,400 in 1956 and 227,800 in 1966.

Following the formation of British Rail, the majority of NUR members worked for the nationalised organisation. However, other members worked for London Transport, the National Freight Corporation and various smaller companies. It also recruited British Rail workers in associated industries, such as its hotels, docks and harbours, and on the Sealink ferries.

In 1990 the NUR merged with the National Union of Seamen to form the National Union of Rail, Maritime and Transport Workers (RMT) and ceased to exist as a separate union.

== Election results ==
The union sponsored numerous Labour Party Parliamentary candidates, many of whom won election.

Election	Constituency	Candidate	Votes	% share	Position
1918 general election	Cardiff East	Arthur James Williams	5,554	28.5	3
1918 general election	Derby	J. H. Thomas	25,145	37.8	1
1918 general election	Manchester Ardwick	Thomas Lowth	5,670	31.8	2
1918 general election	Middlesbrough West	Charlie Cramp	5,350	32.8	2
1918 general election	Newcastle-upon-Tyne East	Walter Hudson	5,195	34.7	2
1918 general election	Reading	Thomas Charles Morris	8,410	29.8	2
1918 general election	Wakefield	Albert Bellamy	5,882	33.7	2
1918 general election	Warrington	Isaac Brassington	5,377	22.6	3
1921 by-election	Dudley	James Wilson	10,244	50.7	1
1921 by-election	Heywood and Radcliffe	Walter Halls	13,430	41.7	1
1922 general election	Bolton	William James Abraham	20,156	15.8	4
1922 general election	Bristol East	Luke Bateman	13,759	49.7	2
1922 general election	Cardiff East	Arthur James Williams	7,506	31.4	3
1922 general election	Derby	J. H. Thomas	25,215	27.0	1
1922 general election	Dudley	James Wilson	8,522	39.8	2
1922 general election	Heywood and Radcliffe	Walter Halls	15,334	44.6	2
1922 general election	Leeds South	Henry Charleton	13,210	53.7	1
1922 general election	Leyton East	William Carter	6,300	30.9	2
1922 general election	Manchester Ardwick	Thomas Lowth	14,031	52.3	1
1922 general election	Salford West	Arthur Law	8,724	32.3	2
1922 general election	Wakefield	Albert Bellamy	9,798	48.5	2
1922 general election	Wolverhampton East	William Thomas Augustus Foot	3,076	12.2	3
1923 general election	Derby	J. H. Thomas	24,887	29.0	1
1923 general election	Leeds South	Henry Charleton	11,705	44.2	1
1923 general election	Manchester Ardwick	Thomas Lowth	15,673	60.4	1
1923 general election	Heywood and Radcliffe	Walter Halls	15,273	47.1	2
1923 general election	Rushcliffe	James Wilson	6,882	24.7	3
1924 general election	Barkston Ash	William Dobbie	11,894	41.4	2
1924 general election	Derby	J. H. Thomas	27,423	25.7	1
1924 general election	Leeds South	Henry Charleton	12,799	46.3	1
1924 general election	Manchester Ardwick	Thomas Lowth	15,941	54.9	1
1924 general election	Oldham	James Wilson	22,081	18.4	4
1924 general election	Paddington North	John William Gordon	10,481	38.1	2
1924 general election	Wakefield	George Sherwood	10,192	47.9	2
1928 by-election	Ashton-under-Lyne	Albert Bellamy	9,567	40.6	1
1929 general election	Ashton-under-Lyne	Albert Bellamy	13,170	44.4	1
1929 general election	Berwick-upon-Tweed	Henry Kegie	5,402	18.4	2
1929 general election	Bethnal Green South West	Christopher John Kelly	6,849	38.7	2
1929 general election	Clitheroe	William Dobbie	15,592	39.5	2
1929 general election	Derby	J. H. Thomas	39,688	30.0	1
1929 general election	Leeds South	Henry Charleton	18,043	52.5	1
1929 general election	Lonsdale	Joseph Henderson	7,303	25.4	3
1929 general election	Manchester Ardwick	Thomas Lowth	20,041	60.3	1
1929 general election	Oldham	James Wilson	32,727	25.0	2
1929 general election	Paddington North	John William Gordon	13,348	39.3	2
1929 general election	Rossendale	Arthur Law	14,624	36.0	1
1929 general election	Wakefield	George Henry Sherwood	13,393	48.8	1
1929 general election	Westbury	George Ward	7,458	22.5	3
1929 general election	York	Frederick George Burgess	20,663	45.0	1
1931 by-election	Ashton-under-Lyne	John William Gordon	11,005	39.4	2
1931 by-election	Manchester Ardwick	Joseph Henderson	15,294	50.5	1
1931 general election	Ashton-under-Lyne	John William Gordon	11,074	37.1	2
1931 general election	Leeds South	Henry Charleton	14,156	40.1	2
1931 general election	Manchester Ardwick	Joseph Henderson	15,664	42.0	2
1931 general election	Middlesbrough West	Henry Kegie	13,040	33.4	2
1931 general election	Oldham	James Wilson	26,631		4
1931 general election	Plymouth Sutton	George Ward	14,073	36.7	2
1931 general election	Rossendale	Arthur Law	11,135	27.5	3
1931 general election	Stalybridge and Hyde	William Dobbie	14,251	28.1	2
1931 general election	Wakefield	George Sherwood	11,774	42.6	2
1931 general election	York	Frederick George Burgess	16,310	35.1	2
1933 by-election	Rotherham	William Dobbie	28,767	69.1	1
1935 by-election	Edinburgh West	William McAdam	10,462	33.9	2
1935 general election	Accrington	Frederick George Burgess	21,203	45.6	2
1935 general election	Barrow-in-Furness	Percy Barstow	17,919	49.7	2
1935 general election	Eccles	Jack Grierson	20,055	47.3	2
1935 general election	Gateshead	James Wilson	25,804	47.3	2
1935 general election	Leeds South	Henry Charleton	15,223	46.0	1
1935 general election	Manchester Ardwick	Joseph Henderson	16,364	52.9	1
1935 general election	Middlesbrough West	Henry Kegie	12,764	33.7	2
1935 general election	Norwich	Christopher John Kelly	22,055	17.8	4
1935 general election	Plymouth Sutton	George Ward	15,394	41.7	2
1935 general election	Pontefract	Adam Hills	19,783	53.4	1
1935 general election	Rotherham	William Dobbie	29,725	67.5	1
1935 general election	Salford North	William McAdam	15,272	43.4	2
1941 by-election	Pontefract	Percy Barstow	unopposed	N/A	1
1944 by-election	Sheffield Attercliffe	John Hynd	unopposed	N/A	1
1945 general election	Acton	Joseph Sparks	19,950	56.1	1
1945 general election	Eccles	William Proctor	23,008	51.1	1
1945 general election	Exeter	Reginald Travess	15,245	40.2	2
1945 general election	Manchester Ardwick	Joseph Henderson	14,360	64.0	1
1945 general election	Newcastle upon Tyne West	Ernest Popplewell	28,149	58.5	1
1945 general election	Pontefract	Percy Barstow	24,690	60.6	1
1945 general election	Rotherham	James Harrison	35,654	74.2	1
1945 general election	Salford North	William McAdam	18,327	60.5	1
1945 general election	Sheffield Attercliffe	John Hynd	23,468	81.4	1
1945 general election	South Derbyshire	Arthur Champion	47,586	57.7	1
1945 general election	The Hartlepools	D. T. Jones	16,502	41.2	1
1945 general election	The Wrekin	Ivor Owen Thomas	22,453	56.3	1
1945 general election	West Stirlingshire	Alfred Balfour	16,066	54.4	1
1948 by-election	Glasgow Camlachie	John Inglis	10,690	42.1	2
1950 general election	Acton	Joseph Sparks	21,751	49.1	1
1950 general election	Birmingham Perry Barr	Cecil Poole	23,178	56.6	1
1950 general election	Eccles	William Proctor	27,409	50.7	1
1950 general election	Manchester Wythenshawe	Charles Bridges	17,191	37.2	2
1950 general election	Newcastle upon Tyne West	Ernest Popplewell	31,230	58.2	1
1950 general election	Nottingham East	James Harrison	20,404	46.5	1
1950 general election	Sheffield Attercliffe	John Hynd	30,726	71.6	1
1950 general election	South East Derbyshire	Arthur Champion	30,039	49.1	1
1950 general election	The Hartlepools	D. T. Jones	25,609	50.6	1
1950 general election	The Wrekin	Ivor Owen Thomas	19,730	53.7	1
1950 general election	Westbury	Reginald Travess	15,766	35.6	2
1950 general election	West Stirlingshire	Alfred Balfour	19,930	55.6	1
1951 general election	Acton	Joseph Sparks	23,287	52.2	1
1951 general election	Birmingham Perry Barr	Cecil Poole	23,322	58.1	1
1951 general election	Eccles	William Proctor	27,941	52.5	1
1951 general election	Haltemprice	Charles Bridges	19,584	41.9	2
1951 general election	Newcastle upon Tyne West	Ernest Popplewell	31,765	57.9	1
1951 general election	Nottingham East	James Harrison	20,865	47.8	1
1951 general election	Sheffield Attercliffe	John Hynd	29,958	71.1	1
1951 general election	South East Derbyshire	Arthur Champion	33,020	52.7	1
1951 general election	The Hartlepools	D. T. Jones	27,147	52.6	1
1951 general election	The Wrekin	Ivor Owen Thomas	20,109	52.4	1
1951 general election	Westbury	Reginald Travess	17,623	39.2	2
1954 by-election	Haltemprice	Charles Bridges	9,974	38.2	2
1955 general election	Acton	Joseph Sparks	20,645	50.6	1
1955 general election	Birmingham Perry Barr	Charles Howell	18,732	51.0	1
1955 general election	Eccles	William Proctor	25,351	52.4	1
1955 general election	Newcastle upon Tyne West	Ernest Popplewell	25,401	55.7	1
1955 general election	Nottingham North	James Harrison	26,552	55.4	1
1955 general election	Sheffield Attercliffe	John Hynd	33,071	71.0	1
1955 general election	South East Derbyshire	Arthur Champion	25,620	51.6	1
1955 general election	South Northamptonshire	Ronald Lewis	17,339	44.7	2
1955 general election	The Hartlepools	D. T. Jones	25,145	51.6	1
1955 general election	The Wrekin	Ivor Owen Thomas	18,541	49.4	2
1955 general election	Westbury	Reginald Travess	16,295	37.8	2
1958 by-election	St Helens	Leslie Spriggs	26,405	64.7	1
1959 general election	Acton	Joseph Sparks	18,438	48.8	2
1959 general election	Birmingham Perry Barr	Charles Howell	16,811	42.6	1
1959 general election	Darlington	Ronald Lewis	19,901	39.7	2
1959 general election	Eccles	William Proctor	25,566	52.0	1
1959 general election	Newcastle upon Tyne West	Ernest Popplewell	28,956	54.8	1
1959 general election	St Helens	Leslie Spriggs	35,961	62.1	1
1959 general election	Sheffield Attercliffe	John Hynd	33,676	68.8	1
1959 general election	South East Derbyshire	Arthur Champion	25,362	45.5	2
1959 general election	The Hartlepools	D. T. Jones	25,281	49.8	2
1964 general election	Birmingham Perry Barr	Charles Howell	18,156	49.5	2
1964 general election	Carlisle	Ronald Lewis	19,169	45.6	1
1964 general election	Glasgow Springburn	Richard Buchanan	16,828	65.3	1
1964 general election	Newcastle upon Tyne West	Ernest Popplewell	29,603	58.3	1
1964 general election	St Helens	Leslie Spriggs	34,137	67.0	1
1964 general election	Sheffield Attercliffe	John Hynd	30,318	66.8	1
1964 general election	Sunderland South	Gordon Bagier	25,900	51.6	1
1966 general election	Carlton	Amos Lloyd Ramsden	24,589	39.2	2
1966 general election	Carlisle	Ronald Lewis	22,565	56.1	1
1966 general election	Glasgow Central	Thomas McMillan	11,673	74.8	1
1966 general election	Glasgow Springburn	Richard Buchanan	15,998	67.8	1
1966 general election	Nottingham South	George Perry	24,580	50.3	1
1966 general election	St Helens	Leslie Spriggs	33,325	70.8	1
1966 general election	Sheffield Attercliffe	John Hynd	32,336	77.3	1
1966 general election	Sunderland South	Gordon Bagier	27,567	57.5	1
1970 general election	Carlisle	Ronald Lewis	21,866	53.2	1
1970 general election	Glasgow Central	Thomas McMillan	7,936	66.0	1
1970 general election	Glasgow Springburn	Richard Buchanan	14,968	64.3	1
1970 general election	Nottingham South	George Perry	23,031	46.3	2
1970 general election	St Helens	Leslie Spriggs	31,587	65.7	1
1970 general election	Sunderland South	Gordon Bagier	26,840	56.4	1
Feb 1974 general election	Carlisle	Ronald Lewis	23,119	55.2	1
Feb 1974 general election	Exeter	Graham Powell	17,686	31.2	2
Feb 1974 general election	Glasgow Central	Thomas McMillan	9,400	58.7	1
Feb 1974 general election	Glasgow Springburn	Richard Buchanan	18,067	53.7	1
Feb 1974 general election	St Helens	Leslie Spriggs	32,621	59.0	1
Feb 1974 general election	Sunderland South	Gordon Bagier	28,296	49.6	1
Feb 1974 general election	West Bromwich East	Peter Snape	21,895	52.8	1
Oct 1974 general election	Carlisle	Ronald Lewis	21,079	51.2	1
Oct 1974 general election	Glasgow Central	Thomas McMillan	9,231	63.6	1
Oct 1974 general election	Glasgow Springburn	Richard Buchanan	17,444	54.6	1
Oct 1974 general election	St Helens	Leslie Spriggs	32,620	64.1	1
Oct 1974 general election	Sunderland South	Gordon Bagier	28,623	55.0	1
Oct 1974 general election	West Bromwich East	Peter Snape	19,942	50.5	1
1976 by-election	Newcastle upon Tyne Central	Harry Cowans	4,692	47.6	1
1979 general election	Carlisle	Ronald Lewis	21,343	49.7	1
1979 general election	Derby North	Phillip Whitehead	28,797	44.9	1
1979 general election	Edinburgh Central	Robin Cook	12,191	47.9	1
1979 general election	Glasgow Central	Thomas McMillan	8,542	72.5	1
1979 general election	Holborn and St Pancras South	Frank Dobson	12,026	49.3	1
1979 general election	Huddersfield West	Richard Faulkner	16,996	40.6	2
1979 general election	Islington North	Michael O'Halloran	12,317	52.6	1
1979 general election	Newcastle upon Tyne Central	Harry Cowans	10,395	67.3	1
1979 general election	St Helens	Leslie Spriggs	32,489	59.6	1
1979 general election	Sunderland South	Gordon Bagier	29,403	53.1	1
1979 general election	Swansea East	Donald Anderson	31,909	69.9	1
1979 general election	West Bromwich East	Peter Snape	19,279	47.0	1
1979 general election	West Lothian	Tam Dalyell	36,713	54.9	1
1983 general election	Carlisle	Ronald Lewis	15,618	37.5	1
1983 general election	Crewe and Nantwich	Gwyneth Dunwoody	22,031	41.1	1
1983 general election	Derby North	Phillip Whitehead	18,797	36.8	2
1983 general election	Glasgow Garscadden	Donald Dewar	19,635	56.2	1
1983 general election	Holborn and St Pancras	Frank Dobson	20,486	47.5	1
1983 general election	Linlithgow	Tam Dalyell	19,694	45.1	1
1983 general election	Livingston	Robin Cook	14,255	37.7	1
1983 general election	Sunderland South	Gordon Bagier	22,869	45.7	1
1983 general election	Swansea East	Donald Anderson	22,297	54.4	1
1983 general election	Tyne Bridge	Harry Cowans	21,127	56.5	1
1983 general election	West Bromwich East	Peter Snape	15,894	38.1	1
1983 general election	Wrexham	John Marek	16,120	34.3	1
1987 general election	Crewe and Nantwich	Gwyneth Dunwoody	25,457	44.0	1
1987 general election	Derby North	Phillip Whitehead	20,236	37.2	2
1987 general election	Glasgow Garscadden	Donald Dewar	18,920	64.4	1
1987 general election	Holborn and St Pancras	Frank Dobson	22,966	50.6	1
1987 general election	Linlithgow	Tam Dalyell	21,869	47.4	1
1987 general election	Livingston	Robin Cook	19,110	45.6	1
1987 general election	Swansea East	Donald Anderson	27,478	63.7	1
1987 general election	West Bromwich East	Peter Snape	18,162	42.6	1
1987 general election	Wrexham	John Marek	22,144	43.9	1

== Leadership ==
=== General Secretaries ===
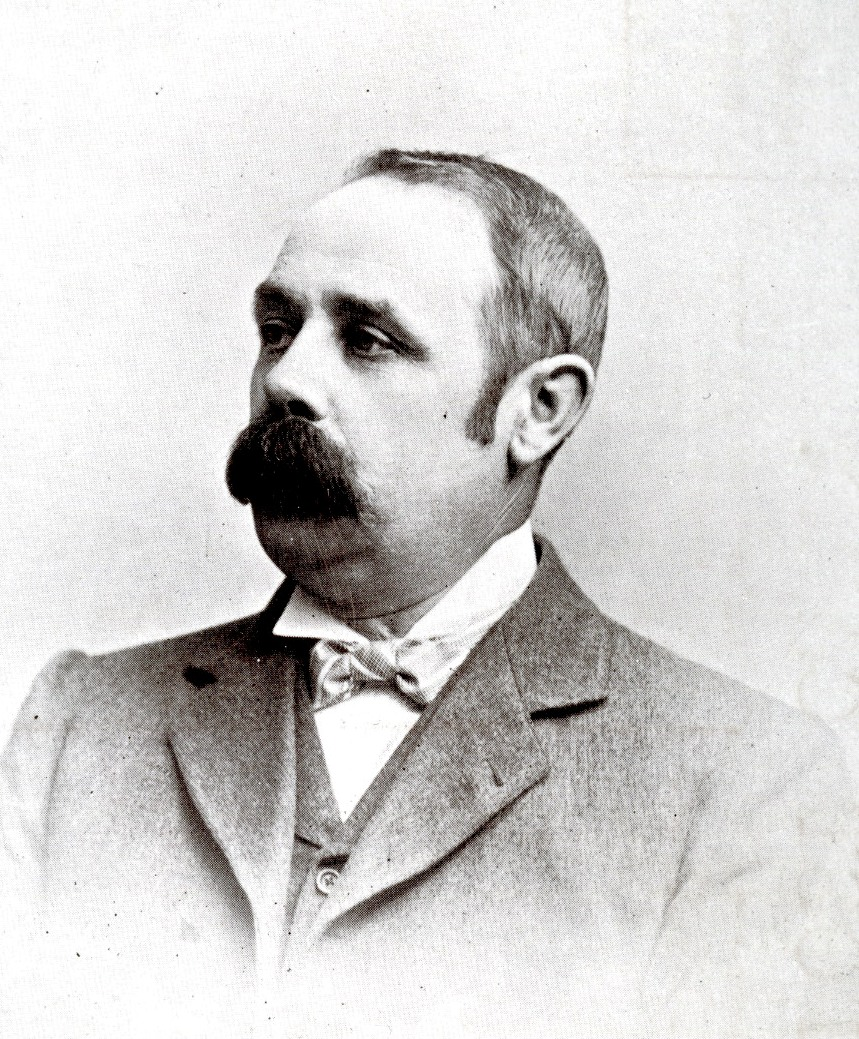
James Edwin Williams

1913: James Edwin Williams
1916: James Henry Thomas
1931: Charlie Cramp
1933: John Marchbank
1943: John Benstead
1948: Jim Figgins
1953: Jim Campbell
1957: Sidney Greene
1975: Sidney Weighell
1983: Jimmy Knapp

=== Presidents ===
1913: Albert Bellamy
1918: Charlie Cramp
1920: William James Abraham
1922: John Marchbank
1925: William Dobbie
1928: J. Gore
1931: William Dobbie
1934: Joseph Henderson
1937: Walter T. Griffiths
1939: John Potts
1942: Frederick Burrows
1945: Eddie Binks
1948: William Tindall Potter
1951: Harry Franklin
1954: Jim Stafford
1957: Tom Hollywood
1958: Charles W. Evans
1961: Bill Rathbone
1964: Frank Donlon
1967: Frank Lane
1970: George Chambers
1972: Harold McRitchie
1975: Dave Bowman
1978: Alun Rees
1982: Tom Ham
1984: George Wakenshaw
1987: Alan Foster
1990: John Cogger

== See also ==
- History of trade unions in the United Kingdom

== Sources and further reading ==
- Bagwell, Philip S. (1963). The Railwaymen. London: George Allen & Unwin.
- Bagwell, Philip S. (1982). The Railwaymen – Volume 2: the Beeching Era and After. London: George Allen & Unwin. ISBN 0-04-331084-2.
- Bagwell, Philip. "Transport" in Chris Wrigley, ed. A History of British industrial relations, 1875–1914 (Univ of Massachusetts Press, 1982), pp. 230–52.
- Griffiths, Robert (2005). Driven by Ideals. London: Associated Society of Locomotive Engineers and Firemen.
- McKillop, Norman (1950). The Lighted Flame; a History of the Associated Society of Locomotive Engineers and Firemen. London & Edinburgh: Thomas Nelson & Sons Ltd.
- Raynes, John (1921), Engines and Men, Goodall & Suddick, Wikidata Q115680227
