= Frank Lane (disambiguation) =

Frank Lane (1896–1981) was an American baseball executive.

Frank Lane may also refer to:

- Frank Lane (trade unionist), British trade unionist
- Frank Lane (American football) on List of Stephen F. Austin Lumberjacks in the NFL draft
- Frankie Lane (1948–2011), footballer

== See also ==
- Francis Lane, athlete
- Frankie Laine (1913–2007), singer
- Frank Lane Wolford (1817–1895), U.S. Representative from Kentucky
