= William Abraham =

William Abraham may refer to:

- William Abraham (Irish politician) (1840–1915), Irish Parliamentary Party Member of Parliament in the British House of Commons
- William Abraham (trade unionist) (1842–1922), Welsh Liberal-Labour Member of Parliament for the Rhondda, 1885–1920
- William J. Abraham (1947–2021), Northern Irish United Methodist pastor and theologian
- Sir William Abraham (British Army officer) (1897–1980), British general
- William Abraham (bishop) (1792–1837), Roman Catholic Bishop of Waterford and Lismore
- William Emmanuel Abraham (born 1934), Ghanaian philosopher
- William James Abraham (1883–1927), British trade unionist and politician
