= Albert Fuller =

Albert Fuller may refer to:

- Albert Fuller (musician), American harpsichordist, conductor and proponent of early music
- Albert Fuller (politician), British member of parliament
- Albert W. Fuller, American architect
