= Figgins =

Figgins is a surname. Notable people and characters with the surname include:

- Vincent Figgins (1766–1844), English typeface designer
- James Figgins (1811–1884), his son, typefounder and member of Parliament
- Jim Figgins (1893–1956), Scottish trade unionist
- Chone Figgins (born 1978), American baseball player
- Morgan Figgins (born 1992), American figure skater
- Principal Figgins, character in the American television programme Glee
