= Arthur James Williams (politician) =

British politician

Arthur James Williams (30 November 1880 – 10 October 1962) was a British trade unionist and politician, who served as Lord Mayor of Cardiff.

Born in Pontypool, Arthur was the son of James Edwin Williams, an activist in the Amalgamated Society of Railway Servants (ASRS). Arthur was educated at Pontymoile National School, then followed his father in working on the railways, joining the Great Western Railway in 1896, and in 1900 became a train guard. He also became active in the ASRS, which in 1907 funded him to attend Ruskin College.

From 1909, Williams worked full-time for the ASRS. In 1913, it became part of the National Union of Railwaymen, and Williams remained active, serving as its organising secretary for Wales, and representing it on various bodies relating to pensions. He also served as editor of The Railway Pioneer journal.

Williams was a supporter of the Labour Party. He wrote What the Labour Party Stands For, and stood unsuccessfully in Cardiff East at the 1918 and 1922 United Kingdom general elections. In 1935, he was elected to Cardiff City Council. He retired from his trade union position in 1940, but remained on the council, and was Lord Mayor of Cardiff in 1958.

Civic offices
Preceded by John Hinds Morgan	Lord Mayor of Cardiff; 1958–1959	Succeeded by Helena Evans
