= Walter T. Griffiths =

Welsh trade union leader (1883–1938)

President of the National Union of Railwaymen
- In office 1937–1938
- Preceded by: Joseph Henderson, 1st Baron Henderson of Ardwick
- Succeeded by: J. H. Potts

Mayor of Newport
- In office 1928–1929

Personal details
- Born: 25 December 1883; South Wales, Wales
- Died: 23 December 1938 (aged 54)
- Political party: Labour
- Profession: Trade union leader

Walter T. Griffiths (25 December 1883 – 23 December 1938) was a Welsh trade union leader.

Born in South Wales, Griffiths left school at the age of thirteen to run errands for a baker, then worked for a short period at the Panteg Steel Works. He later found work for the Great Western Railway, initially as a cleaner, then becoming a fireman, then in 1902, an engine driver. In 1904, he joined the Amalgamated Society of Railway Servants, and he remained active in its successor, the National Union of Railwaymen (NUR), including three spells on its national executive.

Griffiths was a supporter of the Labour Party, and in 1922 he was elected to Newport Town Council, serving as Mayor of Newport in 1928-29.

In 1936, the presidency of the NUR became vacant, and Griffiths was one of twelve candidates for the post. In the final round of voting, he defeated J. B. Foggins, to win the post, and he took up the post at the start of 1937. As president of the union, he was considered a strong negotiator, and he argued in favour of a merger of the various unions of railway workers.

In the early hours of 23 December 1938, Griffiths was sleeping on a train from Paddington to Newport, Wales. On waking, he opened the wrong door from his compartment, and fell to his death.

Trade union offices
Preceded by Joseph Henderson	President of the National Union of Railwaymen; 1937–1938	Succeeded by J. H. Potts
