= George William Brown =

George William Brown may refer to:

- George William Brown (mayor) (1812–1890), American politician, judge and academic
- George William Brown (trade unionist) (1880–?), British trade unionist and politician
- George W. Brown (computer scientist) (1917–2005), American statistician, game theorist, and computer scientist
- George W. Brown (Saskatchewan politician) (1860–1919), Canadian politician
- George Brown (sociologist) (born 1930), British medical sociologist
- George Brown (gridiron football) (1923–2013), American and Canadian football player

== See also ==
- George Brown (disambiguation)
- George Williams Brown (1894–1963), Canadian historian and editor
