= 1919 United Kingdom railway strike =

Railway strike in the United Kingdom

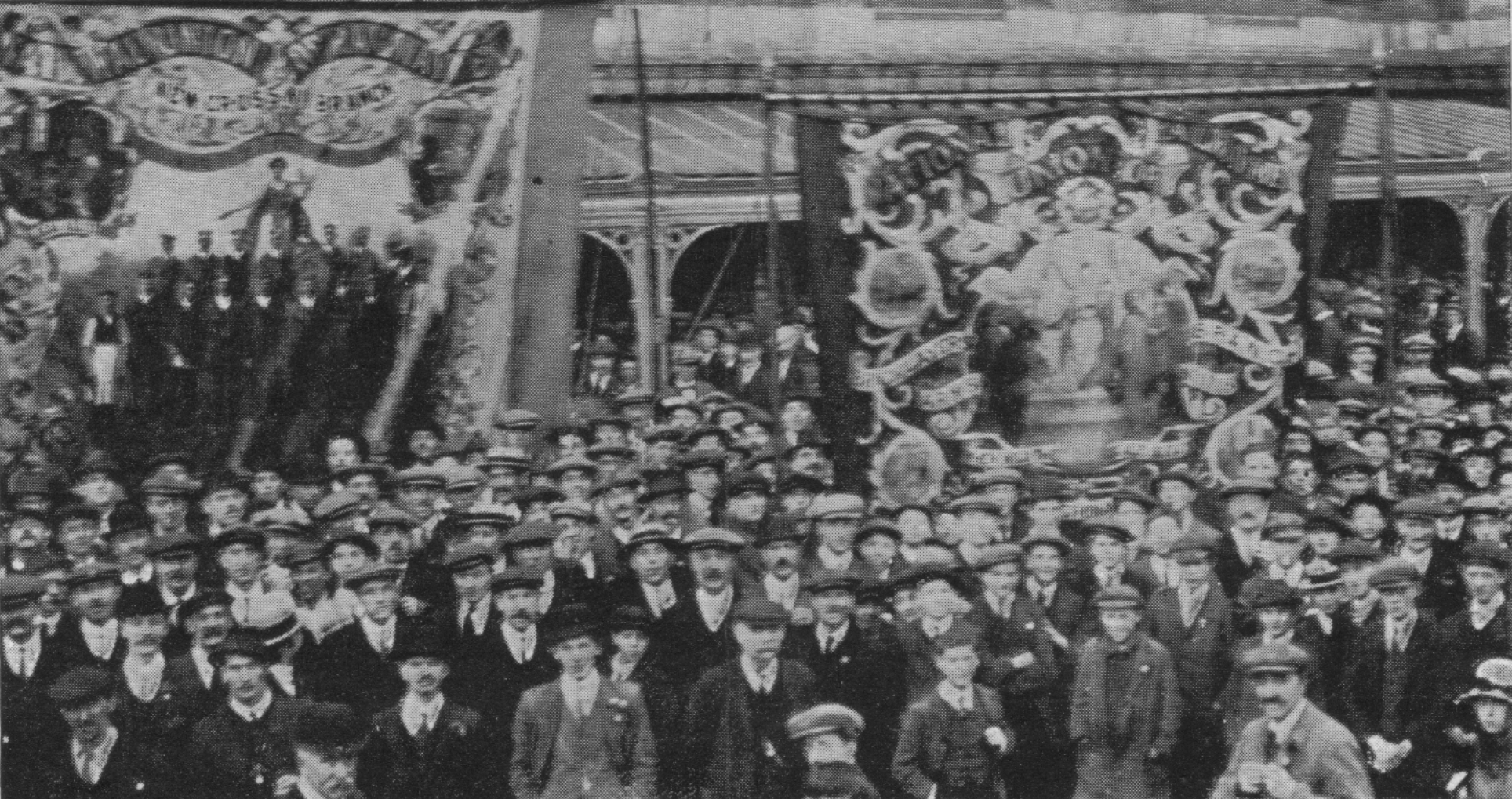
- Striking workers waiting to be admitted to Albert Hall, 27 September 1919
- Date: 26-27 September-5 October 1919
- Goals: Wage stabilization, standardization for different grades of employment
- Result: NUR victory

Parties
National Union of Railwaymen (NUR); Associated Society of Locomotive Engineers and Firemen (ASLEF)	Lloyd George ministry UK rail companies

Lead figures
J. H. Thomas; John Bromley; Charlie Cramp	David Lloyd George; Eric Geddes; Winston Churchill; Robert Horne

The 1919 United Kingdom railway strike was an industrial dispute that lasted from midnight 26–27 September to 5 October 1919. The strike was called to prevent the government from reducing rates of pay that had been negotiated by the Associated Society of Locomotive Engineers and Firemen (ASLEF) and the National Union of Railwaymen (NUR) during the First World War and to standardize pay rates for different grades of employment. After nine days of strike action, the government agreed to maintain wages until September 1920 and to complete wage negotiations before the end of the year.

== Background ==
=== First World War ===
During the First World War, the United Kingdom experienced wartime inflation. The cost of living drastically increased, with food prices rising substantially between 1914 and 1916. Railway workers were especially affected by the war. Rising inflation caused real incomes to drop while workloads increased due to wartime mobilization. In 1914, a truce had been negotiated between unions and railway companies, forestalling discussions of wage increases until the end of the war. However, by 1915, many workers were having difficulty affording basic provisions.

In order to meet the needs of the workers, union organizers pushed for a "war bonus" from companies. This war bonus would be nationally negotiated, bypassing the need for unions to broker agreements with individual companies. They originally called for 5s a week, with the assurance that the government would cover 75% of the cost of the bonus. The companies, meanwhile, called for 2s a week. Ultimately, the two sides brokered a deal where workers whose rate was less than 30s a week would receive 3s while workers whose rate was greater than 30s would receive 2s. Further negotiations took place over the course of the war. By its end, the war bonus, reimagined as a "war wage," had been increased to 33s for adult men, with smaller increases for women and boys.

=== Post-war developments ===
During the war, the government had controlled most aspects of the economy, including industry, extraction, and agriculture. It also directly set food prices via the Ministries of Food Control and Agriculture. However, after the war ended in 1918, the government began to remove controls on prices and wages that it had introduced during the war. This led to an increase in inflation.

In order to safeguard the gains made by workers during the war, the NUR and the ASLEF presented a program to the government in November 1918. This program included demands for the conversion of war wages into real wages, standardized service conditions across railways, equal representation for railway workers and employers on matters of railway management, and an eight-hour workday. The government acquiesced to the demand for an eight-hour day in January 1919, with the new hours becoming effective in February. (Note: Bagwell, Raynes, and coverage in the academic journal The Round Table all claim that the eight-hour day was established in January, prior to the strike. However, Butler-Brown and a page covering the NUR at the University of Warwick's Modern Records Center say that the eight-hour day was established after the strike without giving specific dates.) Wages were also stabilized by an agreement reached in March, which precluded wage reductions until the end of the year. (Note: While both Butler-Brown and the Modern Records Center claim that the government announced a reduction in wages, this is contradicted by The Round Table and Bagwell, who claim that an agreement was reached in March that stabilized wages for the remainder of the year.)

Negotiations continued throughout the year, with payment structures for different grades of employment being the primary point of contention. While the government was willing to grant substantial wage increases to locomotive drivers, they were not willing to do so for porters, conductors, and other railway workers. Negotiations broke down in September, with a telegram calling for a strike going out from Euston station on September 26.

== Strike ==
=== 26-28 September ===
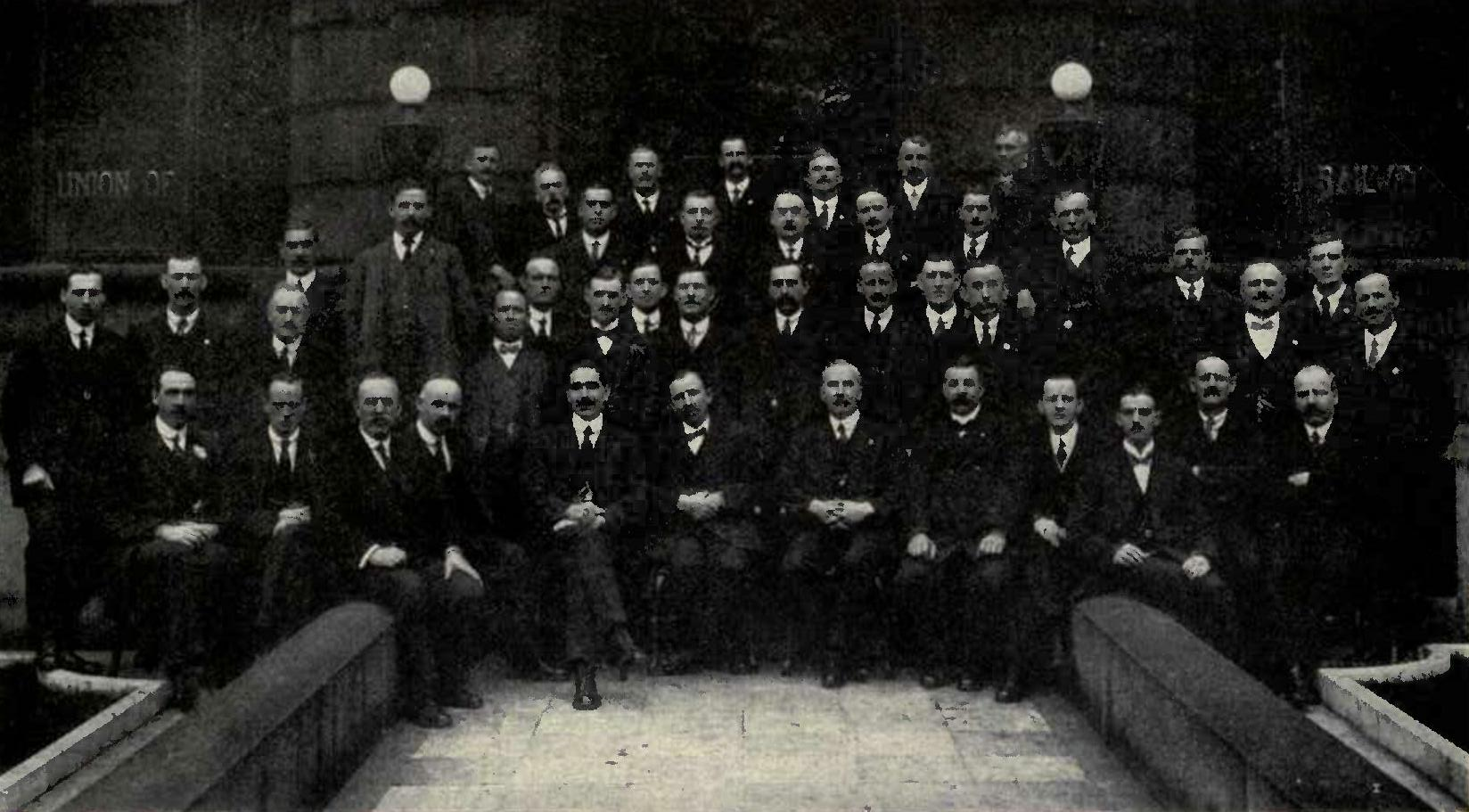
The ASLEF and NUR joint strike committee

The strike began at midnight on 26-27 September 1919, with both the NUR and the ASLEF participating. Strike leaders included J. H. Thomas, general secretary of the NUR; Charlie Cramp, president of the NUR; and John Bromley, general secretary of the ASLEF. Prime Minister David Lloyd George responded to the strike by canceling an address he had planned for the town council in Caernarfon and condemning the strike leaders, accusing them of acting without the approval of the rank and file and of being tied to an anarchist conspiracy. Meanwhile, the unions touted the response from their members, which they said went "beyond all expectations". Train service was slowed or suspended across the country, with major disruptions on all lines except the Metropolitan.

Soon after the strike began, a special strike committee was appointed, consisting of Minister of Transport Eric Geddes, War Secretary Winston Churchill, and Minister of Labour Robert Horne. Meanwhile, the Ministry of Food Control responded to the strike by bringing into effect the "Divisional Food Commissions Order," which allowed the ministry to take control of "all horses and road vehicles" for the transport of goods. The ministry also introduced price controls; restricted the consumption of flour, milk, butchers' meat, sugar, and bread in pubs; and stipulated that "no person could acquire any article of food so that the quantity of such article at one time exceeded that required for ordinary use".

Many newspapers, including the Daily Mail, the Times, the Morning Post, and the Daily Graphic were critical of the strike in its early days, with the exception being the Daily Herald. It argued that:

Nobody likes striking. Nobody strikes lightly. Nobody faces what is involved in a great national stoppage of an essential industry with any but the heaviest sense of responsibility.

=== 29 September - 1 October ===
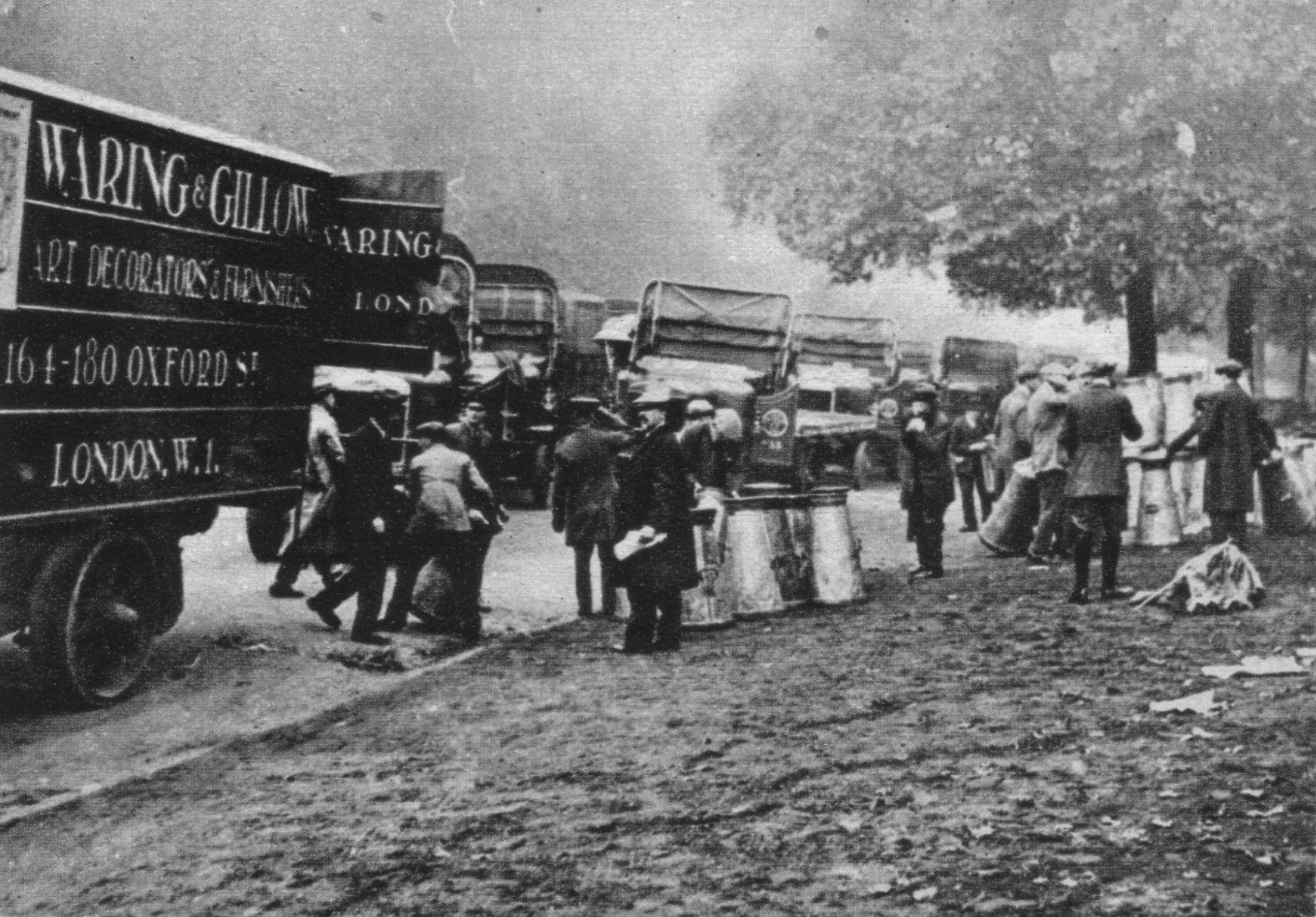
Volunteer porters at Hyde Park

By 29 September, train service had improved considerably throughout the country, though it was still greatly reduced relative to before the strike due to a lack of drivers and signalmen. In order to mitigate staffing shortages, the government put out a call for volunteers to work in various positions on the railways, including as drivers, signalmen, porters, and firemen. Some also worked in non-railway positions, including as lorry drivers and pilots. Volunteers included ex-railway employees, soldiers, and members of the titled aristocracy.

While police were well-positioned to prevent disturbances during the strike and generally did not confront the strikers directly, there were a few instances of localized conflict involving strikers. On 29 September, Scottish Command reported that strikers had stopped two trains, injured a fireman, and pulled the engine driver from one of the trains. On 1 October, several incidents were reported, including an assault on an engine driver in Lanarkshire, the vandalism of a signal lamp in Nostell, and another assault on an engine driver in Glasgow.

On 30 September, strike leader Thomas held a meeting at Clapham Common where he indicated that he would not call any other unions into the strike. The next day, another meeting took place including representatives from various other labour organizations, where it was decided that the unions would send a deputation to negotiate terms with the government.

Some newspapers began to report more positively on the strike during this time, partially due to pressure from the Labour Research Department (LRD) and partially due to the threat of a printers' strike in sympathy with the railway workers. The Daily Sketch and Manchester Guardian both devoted positive coverage to the strike and the Daily News ran an article under Thomas's signature.

=== 2-5 October ===
On 2 October, the union deputation met with Lloyd George, who proposed that wages be stabilized until the end of next March, that the government prepare for discussions on standardization, and that any points of difference on standardization be referred to arbitration. The NUR refused the government's offer. On the same day, a short film by Lloyd George appeared in various cinemas across the country, defending the government's position and portraying the strike leaders as extremists intent on immiserating the British people. The unions put out their own short film the next day, arguing that:

If the wages of the railwaymen are reduced other trades will follow. This is only the first battle of the campaign and the Government has thrown all its weight against the men. We are out to prevent a return to pre-war conditions and we mean to win. It is your fight as well as out and we want you to help us.

Negotiations continued on 3 October, with the government asking that the strikers agree to a seven-day truce so that a settlement could be reached. The NUR said that they would agree to a truce if the government agreed to work toward grade standardization. The government refused and made a counteroffer, this time asking for a truce in exchange for "discussions" surrounding wage stabilization and grade standardization. They also asked that the unions give a 48-hour notice before striking again. The NUR rejected these terms and negotiations concluded for the day.

Minor confrontations continued to play out during this time. On 3 October a signalman who had chosen not to strike had his windows broken and several large stones were placed on rail lines to obstruct passage. Then on 4 October more stones were placed, two volunteers were assaulted in Hull, stones were thrown at a driver in Kent, and two volunteers had acid thrown at their faces in Clapham. Aside from these incidents, there were no other reported disruptions and the strike remained relatively peaceful.

No negotiations took place on 4 October, but the deputation did send a signed message to the government threatening to extend the strike to other trades if they did not adopt "a more reasonable attitude". Negotiations resumed on 5 October, and after almost four hours, a settlement was reached. In exchange for the resumption of work, the government agreed that wages would be stabilized until the end of next September, that no railway worker would receive less than 51s as long as the cost of living remained at 110% over the pre-war level, and that negotiations about the wages for different grades would be completed by the end of the year.

At 4:15 pm, Thomas sent out a telegram indicating that the strike was over, and workers returned to their jobs the next day.

== Aftermath and legacy ==
The final settlement was met with approval from the workers. At a rally at Albert Hall on 5 October the strike leaders were given an ovation, and a resolution was passed thanking them for their work during the strike. In the end, the strike had cost the government roughly £10 million (equivalent to £446 million in 2025), the workers roughly £1 million in foregone wages (equivalent to £45 million in 2025), and the unions roughly £500 thousand in advertising and administrative fees (equivalent to £22 million in 2025).

Negotiations would proceed in November, with representatives from both the unions and the companies taking part. In January 1920, this resulted in a new government proposal with standardized wages "on the average" and a two-tiered wage scheme that included both a standard "B" rate and an additional "A" rate, which would be indexed to the cost of living. This proposal proved contentious due to its exclusion of the Irish railways and shopmen, and it was ultimately voted down by the unions. A subsequent proposal that included the Irish railways and promised pending negotiations for shopmen was approved on 15 January.

The strike has been described as a victory for the NUR and a pivotal moment in British labour history, establishing the basis for subsequent labour disputes such as the 1926 United Kingdom general strike.

== Sources and further reading ==
- Bagwell, Philip S. (29 November 2022). The Railwaymen: Volume 1: The History of the National Union of Railwaymen. London: Routledge. doi:10.4324/9781003358220. ISBN 978-1-003-35822-0.
- Clegg, Hugh A. (1985). A History of British Trade Unions Since 1889. Oxford: Oxford University Press. ISBN 0-19-828229-X.
- Edgcombe, Joshua (21 June 2018). The 1919 Railway Strike: the Government's Response (Master's thesis). University of Hertfordshire.
- Raynes, John R. (1921). Engines and Men . Leeds: Goodall & Suddick – via Wikisource.
