= John Marchbank =

Scottish trade unionist

Marchbank (third from right) as part of a Trades Union Congress delegation to Downing Street in 1925

John Marchbank (19 January 1883 – 25 March 1946) was a Scottish trade unionist.

Born in Lambfoot in Dumfriesshire, Marchbank worked in his youth as an assistant to his father, who was a shepherd. He moved to work for the Caledonian Railway Company when he reached eighteen and, other than a short period in the Dumfriesshire County Police, spent the remainder of his working life on railway matters.

In 1906, Marchbank joined the Amalgamated Society of Railway Servants. This became part of the new National Union of Railwaymen (NUR) in 1912, and Marchbank was elected to its executive committee. He served as the union's president from 1922 to 1924, the last year of which he also served on the General Council of the Trades Union Congress (TUC). In 1933, he was elected as general secretary of the NUR, and was also re-elected to the TUC General Council. He additionally served as vice-president of the International Transport Workers' Federation from 1935.

Marchbank retired from his posts at the NUR 1943, but was asked to remain in his international post until the first post-war conference of the federation. Ultimately, he died a few months before it was held, aged 63.

Trade union offices
Preceded by William James Abraham	President of the National Union of Railwaymen; 1922–1924	Succeeded by William Dobbie
Preceded by Arthur Pugh and Will Sherwood	Trades Union Congress representative to the American Federation of Labour; 1928; With: Ebby Edwards	Succeeded by James Bell and James Thomas Brownlie
Preceded by Charlie Cramp as Industrial General Secretary	Assistant General Secretary of the National Union of Railwaymen; 1931–1933	Succeeded by George William Brown
Preceded by Charlie Cramp	General Secretary of the National Union of Railwaymen; 1933–1943	Succeeded by John Benstead
Preceded by Charles Dukes	Chairman of the Trades Councils' Joint Consultative Committee; 1938 – 1944	Succeeded by Harry N. Harrison
