= Joseph Henderson, 1st Baron Henderson of Ardwick =

Joseph Henderson, 1st Baron Henderson of Ardwick (1884 – 26 February 1950) was a Labour Party politician in the United Kingdom.

He won money in the Irish Sweep and went on to become Lord Mayor of Carlisle from 1927-1928. He was President of the National Union of Railwaymen from 1934 to 1937 before being succeeded by Walter T. Griffiths.

Joseph Henderson married on 31 Dec 1908 in Scotland to Janet Glendinning Byers (1881-1962). They had one daughter Marjorie (1910-1988).

He was elected as Member of Parliament (MP) for Manchester Ardwick at a by-election in June 1931, following the death of the Labour MP Thomas Lowth. At the general election in October 1931, when Labour split over Ramsay MacDonald's formation of a National Government, he lost the seat to the Conservative Party candidate Albert George Hubert Fuller.

Henderson regained the seat at the 1935 general election, and represented Manchester Ardwick in the House of Commons until he was elevated to the peerage in the Dissolution Honours List on 22 January 1950, as Baron Henderson of Ardwick, of Morton Park in the City of Carlisle. He died only five weeks later, in Carlisle, on 26 February, aged 65, when the title became extinct.

Parliament of the United Kingdom
Preceded by Thomas Lowth	Member of Parliament for Manchester Ardwick; June 1931–1931	Succeeded by Albert George Hubert Fuller
Preceded by Albert George Hubert Fuller	Member of Parliament for Manchester Ardwick; 1935–1950	Succeeded by Leslie Lever
Trade union offices
Preceded by William Dobbie	President of the National Union of Railwaymen; 1934–1937	Succeeded by Walter T. Griffiths
Peerage of the United Kingdom
New creation	Baron Henderson of Ardwick; 1950	Extinct
