= Hartley Shawcross =

English barrister and politician

The Right Honourable The Lord Shawcross GBE PC QC
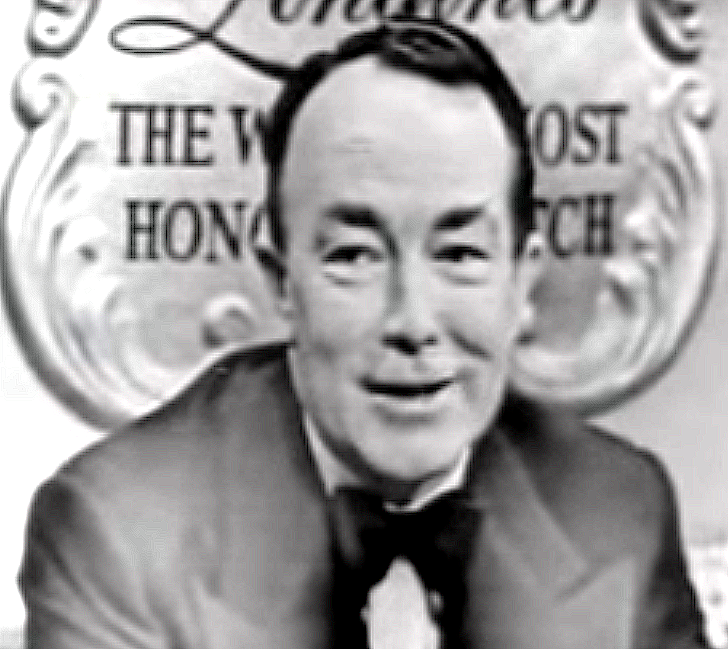
- Shawcross being interviewed in 1954

President of the Board of Trade
- In office 24 April 1951 – 26 October 1951
- Prime Minister: Clement Attlee
- Preceded by: Harold Wilson
- Succeeded by: Peter Thorneycroft

Attorney General for England and Wales
- In office 4 August 1945 – 24 April 1951
- Prime Minister: Clement Attlee
- Preceded by: Sir David Maxwell Fyfe
- Succeeded by: Sir Frank Soskice

Member of Parliament for St Helens
- In office 5 July 1945 – May 1958
- Preceded by: William Albert Robinson
- Succeeded by: Leslie Spriggs

Member of the House of Lords
- Lord Temporal
- Life peerage 14 February 1959 – 10 July 2003

Personal details
- Born: Hartley William Shawcross; 4 February 1902 Giessen, Grand Duchy of Hesse, German Empire
- Died: 10 July 2003 (aged 101) Cowbeech, East Sussex, England
- Party: Labour (before 1959)
- Other political affiliations: Crossbencher (1959–2003)
- Spouses: Alberta Rosita Shyvers (m. 1924; died 1943) Joan Winifred Mather (m. 1944; died 1974) Susanne Monique Huiskamp (m. 1997)
- Children: 3 (by Mather; including William)
- Education: Dulwich College
- Alma mater: London School of Economics; University of Geneva
- Awards: Knight Bachelor (1945)

Hartley William Shawcross, Baron Shawcross, GBE, PC, QC (4 February 1902 – 10 July 2003), known from 1945 to 1959 as Sir Hartley Shawcross, was an English barrister and Labour politician who served as the lead British prosecutor at the Nuremberg War Crimes tribunal. He also served as Britain's principal delegate to the United Nations immediately after the Second World War and as Attorney General for England and Wales.

== Early life ==
Hartley William Shawcross was born in Giessen, Germany, elder son of British parents, John Shawcross, MA (Oxon) (1871–1966) and Hilda Constance (died 1942), daughter of G. Asser. At this time, his father was teaching English at Giessen University. His younger brother, Christopher (1905–1973), was a barrister and Labour party politician. Shawcross attended Dulwich College, the London School of Economics and the University of Geneva and read for the Bar at Gray's Inn, where he won first-class honours.

== Career ==
Shawcross interviewed on CBS-TV's Longines Chronoscope (1954)

During his initial career as a barrister, Shawcross was part of the legal team hired by the colliery owners at the inquiry into the Gresford Colliery disaster in 1934, Stafford Cripps in counterpart representing the miners' union.

He joined the Labour Party and was Member of Parliament for St Helens, Lancashire, from 1945 to 1958, being appointed to be Attorney General in 1945 until 1951. In 1946, when debating the repeal of laws against trade unions in the House of Commons, Shawcross allegedly said "We are the masters now", a phrase that came to haunt him.

He was knighted in 1945 upon his appointment as Attorney-General and named Chief Prosecutor for the United Kingdom at the Nuremberg trials.

=== Nuremberg Trials ===
Shawcross's advocacy before the Nuremberg Trial was passionate. His most famous line was: "There comes a point when a man must refuse to answer to his leader if he is also to answer to his own conscience".

He avoided the crusading style of American, Soviet, and French prosecutors. Shawcross's opening speech, which lasted two days, 26 and 27 July 1946, sought to undermine any belief that the Nuremberg Trials were "victor's justice" in the sense of being revenge exacted against defeated foes. He focused on the rule of law and demonstrated that the laws that the defendants had broken, expressed in international treaties and agreements, were those to which prewar Germany had been a party. In his closing speech, he ridiculed any notion that any of the defendants could have remained ignorant of Aktion T4, extermination of thousands of Germans because they were old or mentally ill. He used the same argument in respect of millions of other people "annihilated in the gas chambers or by shooting" and maintained that each of the 22 defendants was a party to "common murder in its most ruthless forms".

=== Attorney-General and UN Factotum ===
As Attorney-General, he prosecuted William Joyce ("Lord Haw-Haw") and John Amery for treason, Klaus Fuchs and Alan Nunn May for giving atomic secrets to the Soviet Union, and John George Haigh, 'the acid bath murderer'.

From 1945 to 1949, he was Britain's principal delegate to the United Nations and was involved in the official adoption of the Flag of the United Nations in 1946, but he was recalled in 1948 to lead for the government's interest at the Lynskey tribunal. In 1951, he briefly served as President of the Board of Trade until the Labour government's defeat in the election of that year.

Shawcross lent his name to a Parliamentary principle, in a defence of his conduct regarding an illegal strike, that the Attorney-General "is not to be put, and is not put, under pressure by his colleagues in the matter" of whether or not to establish criminal proceedings.

In 1951, he replaced Harold Wilson as President of the Board of Trade after Wilson and the Bevanite members of the Cabinet resigned in protest of the introduction of prescription charges for the National Health Service by Chancellor of the Exchequer Hugh Gaitskell.

=== Return to opposition ===
Shawcross ended his law career in 1951, the same year as the defeat of the second Attlee ministry. He was expected to become a Conservative, earning him the nickname "Sir Shortly Floorcross", but instead he remained true to his Labour roots.

During the committal hearing for the suspected serial killer doctor John Bodkin Adams in January 1957, he was seen dining with the defendant's suspected lover, Sir Roland Gwynne (Mayor of Eastbourne from 1929–31), and Lord Goddard, the Lord Chief Justice, at a hotel in Lewes. The meeting added to concerns that the Adams trial was the subject of concerted judicial and political interference.

Shawcross resigned from Parliament in 1958, saying he was tired of party politics.

=== Elevation ===
Shawcross was made one of Britain's first life peers on 14 February 1959 as Baron Shawcross, of Friston in the County of Sussex, and sat in the House of Lords as a crossbencher.

=== Defending press freedom ===
In 1961, he was appointed the chairman of the second Royal Commission on the Press. In 1967 he became one of the directors of The Times responsible for ensuring its editorial independence. He resigned on being appointed chairman of the Press Council in 1974.

From 1974 to 1978, he was chairman of the Press Council and is described as "forthright in his condemnation both of journalists who committed excesses and of proprietors who profited from them" and as a "doughty defender of press freedom". In October 1974, he poured scorn on a Labour Party pamphlet that recommended the application of "internal democracy" to editorial policy, saying "This means that... there would be some sort of committee consisting at the best of a mixture of van drivers, press operators, electricians and the rest, with no doubt a few journalists, but more probably composed of trade union officials, to deal with editorial policy."

In 1983, Shawcross chaired a Tribunal of Enquiry to handle a protest over the outcome of the 1983 British Saloon Car Championship.

=== Chancellor of the University of Sussex ===
From 1965 to 1985 Shawcross was Chancellor of the University of Sussex.

== Later years ==
In the 1974 New Year Honours, Lord Shawcross was appointed a Knight Grand Cross of the Order of the British Empire (GBE).

Shawcross held a number of company directorships including with EMI, Rank Hovis MacDougall, Caffyns Motors Ltd, Morgan et Cie SA, and Times Newspapers, and chairman of Upjohn & Co Ltd. He had served as chairman of the International Chamber of Commerce's Commission on Unethical Practices and of Morgan Guaranty Trust Company's Internal Advisory Council.

In the 1980s, Shawcross was sympathetic towards Margaret Thatcher and the Social Democratic Party, but never joined another political party.

== Philanthropy and awards ==
In 1957, he was among a group of eminent British lawyers who founded JUSTICE, the human rights and law reform organisation and he became its first chairman, a position he held until 1972. He was instrumental in the foundation of the University of Sussex and served as chancellor of the university from 1965–85.

He was the President of the charity Attend (then National Association of Leagues of Hospital Friends) from 1962–72.

== Personal life ==
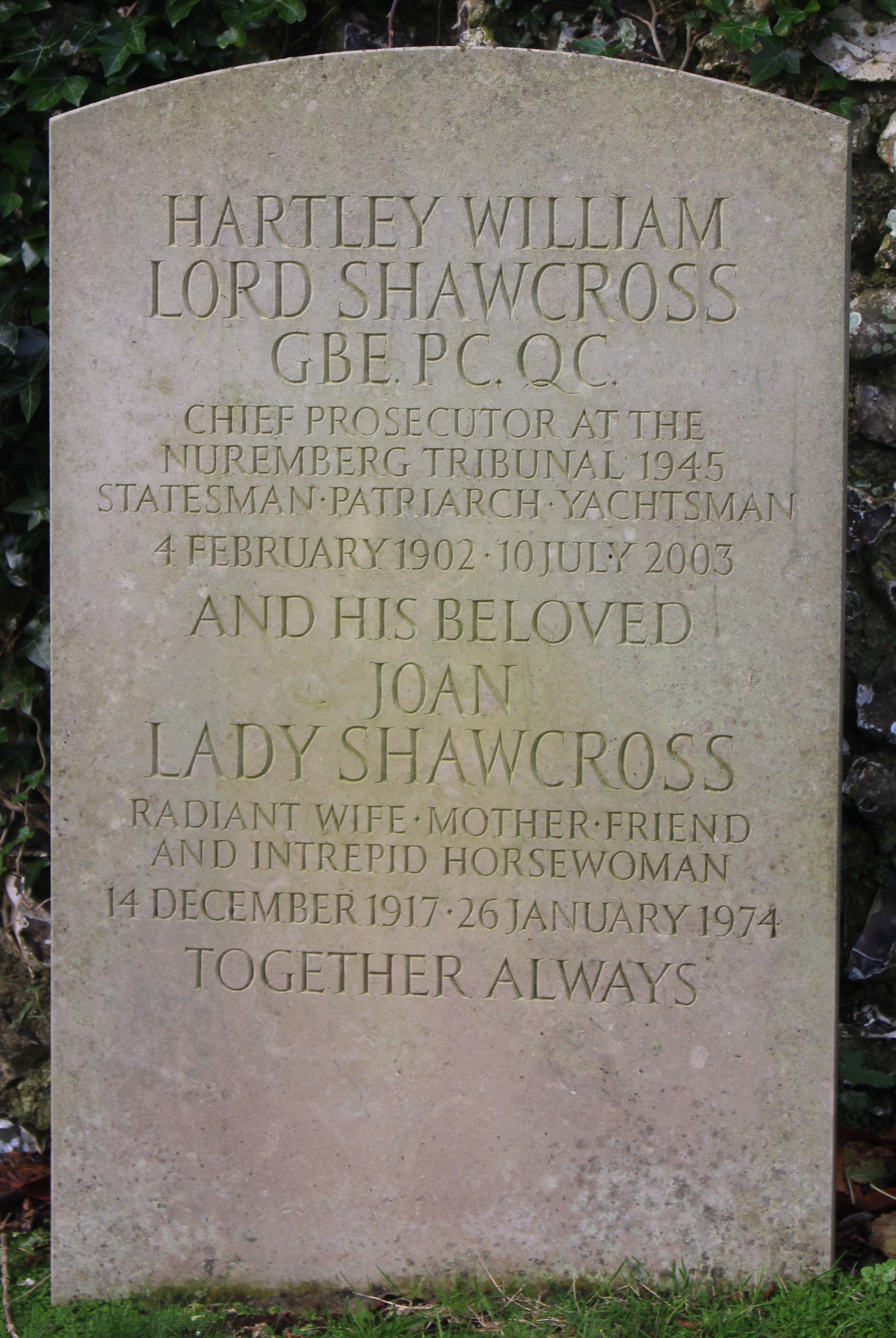
Lord Shawcross's gravestone – Jevington, East Sussex.

Lord Shawcross was married three times. His first wife, Alberta Rosita Shyvers (m. 24 May 1924), suffered from multiple sclerosis and died by suicide on 30 December 1943.

His second wife, Joan Winifred Mather (m. 21 September 1944), died in a riding accident on the Sussex Downs on 26 January 1974. They had three children: the author and historian William Shawcross, Hume Shawcross and Dr Joanna Shawcross.

At the age of 95, he married Susanne Monique (née Jansen), formerly wife of Gerald B. Huiskamp, on 18 April 1997 in Gibraltar. His family had opposed the marriage out of concern for Shawcross' declining abilities in old age, and had him placed under the supervision of the Court of Protection; they won a court ruling "after the humiliation of medical and psychological tests" concluded Shawcross "was incapable of rational decision", but Shawcross and his future wife eloped to Gibraltar, where the courts ruled the opposite. Lady Shawcross died on 2 March 2013.

Shawcross was a member of the Royal Yacht Squadron and the Royal Cornwall Yacht Club. From 1947 to 1960 he was the owner of Vanity V, a 12-metre class racing yacht designed by William Fife to the Third International Rule, built in 1936, which he kept at his home in Cornwall. A later skipper of the boat, John Crill, recalls being told that Lord Shawcross, "when the election was due in about 1951, had Vanity V repainted with a vast 'Vote Labour' banner all the way along her topsides".

Lord Shawcross died on 10 July 2003 at home at Cowbeech, East Sussex, at the age of 101 and is buried in the churchyard of St Andrew's Church, Jevington, East Sussex.

== Arms ==
Coat of arms of Hartley Shawcross
Crest Upon the battlements of a tower Proper a martlet Gules holding in the beak a cross paty fitchy Or. Escutcheon Per pale Azure and Gules on a saltire between four annulets Argent an ermine spot Sable. Supporters Dexter a lion Argent gorged with a chain Sable pendant therefrom an escutcheon also Sable charged with a balance Or sinister a griffin Sable armed and langued Azure gorged with a chain pendent therefrom a portcullis Or. Orders Insignia, collar, and circlet of a Knight Grand Cross of the Most Excellent Order of the British Empire

== Bibliography ==
- Shawcross, H. (1995). Life Sentence. London: Constable. ISBN 978-0-09-474980-1.

Parliament of the United Kingdom
Preceded by William Albert Robinson	Member of Parliament for St Helens; 1945–1958	Succeeded by Leslie Spriggs
Legal offices
Preceded by Sir David Maxwell Fyfe	Attorney General for England and Wales; 1945–1951	Succeeded by Sir Frank Soskice
Political offices
Preceded by Harold Wilson	President of the Board of Trade; April–October 1951	Succeeded by Peter Thorneycroft
Media offices
Preceded by Edward Pearce	Chairman of the Press Council; 1974–1978	Succeeded by Patrick Neill
Honorary titles
Preceded by The Lord Balfour of Inchrye	Senior Privy Counsellor; 1988–2003; With: The Earl of Listowel (1988–1997)	Succeeded by The Duke of Edinburgh
Preceded by The Lord Shackleton	Senior life peer 1994–2003	Succeeded by The Lord Chalfont
