= Charles Vachell =

Cardiff Whig politician and businessman

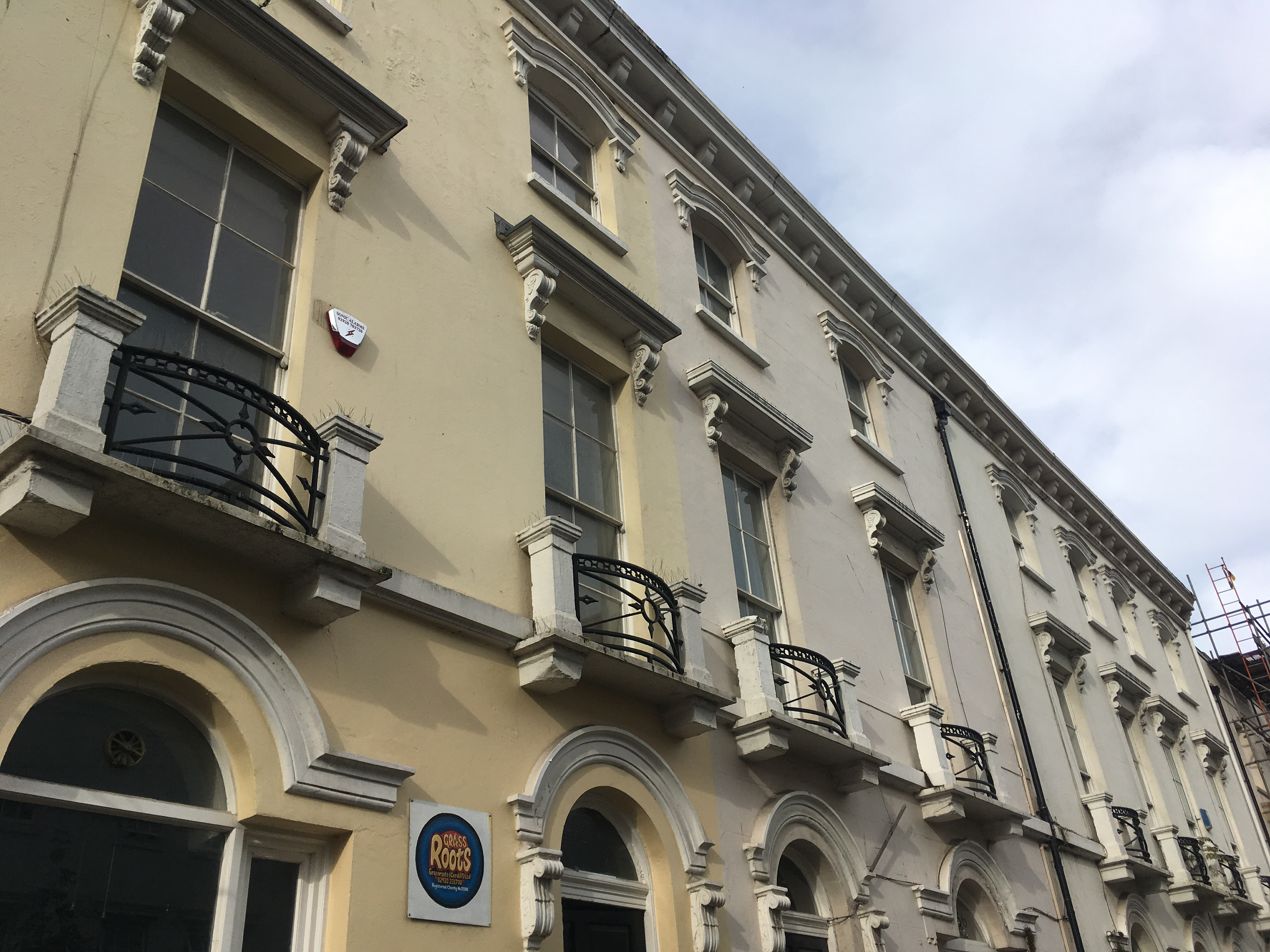
Charles Street buildings, Cardiff

Charles Vachell (c.1783 – 19 January 1859) was a businessman and local Whig politician who twice became mayor of Cardiff in Glamorgan, Wales. He was also an alderman and Chief Magistrate of the town.

== Background ==
Vachell's father had been a naval surgeon and came to Cardiff when Charles was a small child. Vachell senior opened a chemist's shop in Duke Street in 1790. Charles later took over the running of the chemist's shop, subsequently opening an ironmongers next door.

Vachell was a Wesleyan and a teetotaller. He married and had six sons and one daughter.

== Charles Street ==
Vachell's businesses were successful, allowing him to retire and hand over the businesses in 1849. He invested his money in property and land in Cardiff. Some of his land was used for the creation of one of the town's most well-to-do streets, which became known as Charles Street, named after him. In March 1849, when planning Cardiff's new drainage, Charles Street was described as the town's "principal street" (though Vachell, being a member of the street commissioners, was criticised for having a conflict of interest).

== Politics and public service ==
Vachell was one of the original town councillors to Cardiff Town Council when it was created in December 1835. He was elected as Mayor of Cardiff in 1848 and again in 1855. He was also elected as Cardiff's Chief Magistrate.

His first period as mayor was marked by his campaign against all forms of gambling in public houses. Vachell represented Cardiff at the Lord Mayor of York's dinner, where the principal mayors of the United Kingdom mayors were represented. During both of his periods in office, as a teetotaller, he refused to grant any additional pub licenses in the town.

Vachell was a notable supporter of the poor and dispossessed. He was a Guardian of the Poor for the parish of St John and a vice president of Cardiff's Infirmary. During Vachell's second period as mayor he established a 'Poor Box' in the Police Court to collect money for those in need (though this was discontinued as soon as his period in office ended).

Vachell was elected as an alderman in January 1855. By 1859 Vachell was one of only three councillors to have been founding members of the council.

== Death ==
Morgan died at his house in Crockherbtown, Cardiff, on 19 January 1859, after being in failing health for several months. He was 75 years old. He had a private funeral seven days later. Three of his sons continued in business in Cardiff, while two others moved away. His widow and a son continued to live in his substantial Crockerbtown house. Vachell's eldest son, Dr Charles Redwood Vachell, became a popular town physician as well as a town councillor, though died only a few years after his father in 1865.
