= Augustine Hailwood =

British politician

Member of Parliament for Manchester Ardwick
- In office 14 December 1918 – 26 October 1922
- Preceded by: Constituency established
- Succeeded by: Thomas Lowth

Personal details
- Born: 11 December 1875
- Died: 1 December 1939 (aged 63)
- Party: Unionist
- Spouse: Mary Hilda Amiel
- Children: 3
- Education: Xaverian College

Augustine Hailwood JP (11 December 1875 – 1 December 1939), was a British baker and Unionist Party politician, MP for Manchester Ardwick from 1918-22.

== Background ==
Hailwood was born the son of James and Elizabeth Hailwood. He was educated at Xaverian College, Manchester. He married Mary Hilda Amiel. They had three sons.

== Political career ==
Hailwood was a member of Manchester City Council from 1909–11. He was Honorary Secretary of the East Manchester Unionist and Unionist Association. He was Unionist candidate for the Manchester Ardwick division at the 1918 General Election. He was endorsed by the Coalition government and was easily elected. He was defeated at the 1922 General Election, lost again in 1923 and did not stand in 1924. He was a justice of the peace for the City of Manchester. He was a Governor of St Bede's College, Manchester. He did not stand for parliament again.

=== Electoral record ===
General Election 1918: Manchester Ardwick
| Party | | Candidate | Votes | % | ±% |
|---|---|---|---|---|---|
| C | Unionist | Augustine Hailwood | 8,641 | 48.5 | n/a |
| | Labour | Thomas Lowth | 5,670 | 31.8 | n/a |
| | National | H.M. Stephenson | 3,510 | 19.7 | n/a |
| Majority | | | 2,971 | 16.7 | n/a |
| Turnout | | | 17,821 | 47.9 | n/a |
| Registered electors | | | 37,214 | | |
| | Unionist win (new seat) | | | | |
C indicates candidate endorsed by the coalition government.

General Election 1922: Manchester Ardwick
| Party | Candidate | Votes | % | ±% |
|---|---|---|---|---|
| Labour | Thomas Lowth | 14,031 | 52.3 | +20.5 |
| Unionist | Augustine Hailwood | 12,777 | 47.7 | −0.8 |
| Majority | | 1,254 | 4.6 | n/a |
| Turnout | | 26,808 | 71.4 | +23.5 |
| Registered electors | | 37,572 | | |
| Labour gain from Unionist | | Swing | +10.7 | |

General Election 1923: Manchester Ardwick
| Party | Candidate | Votes | % | ±% |
|---|---|---|---|---|
| Labour | Thomas Lowth | 15,673 | 60.4 | +8.1 |
| Unionist | Augustine Hailwood | 10,266 | 39.6 | −8.1 |
| Majority | | 5,407 | 20.8 | +16.2 |
| Turnout | | 25,939 | 69.3 | −2.1 |
| Registered electors | | 37,404 | | |
| Labour hold | | Swing | +8.1 | |
