= Harry Franklin =

British trade unionist

Henry W. Franklin (died January 1972) was a British trade unionist who served on the National Executive Committee of the Labour Party.

Based in Gloucester, Franklin joined the National Union of Railwaymen (NUR), and soon came to prominence. He was elected as chair of the No.3 Sectional Council in the Western Region, and then in 1930 as chair of the union's Swindon Council. In 1931, he was one of only five delegates to vote in favour of paying J. H. Thomas a £500 annual pension, despite him having resigned before reaching retirement age.

In 1946, Franklin was elected to its executive committee of the NUR, and in 1951, he became president of the union. He was a supporter of the Labour Party, and was elected to its National Executive Committee in 1951, serving until 1954. His term as president also ended in 1954; he was nominated for the post again in 1957, but was not elected.

Trade union offices
| Preceded by William Tindall Potter | President of the National Union of Railwaymen; 1951–1954 | Succeeded by Jim Stafford |
