= Thomas Lowth =

British politician (1858–1931)

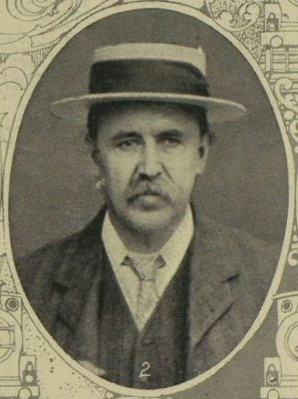
- Lowth in 1911

Member of Parliament for Manchester Ardwick
- In office 15 November 1922 – 26 May 1931
- Preceded by: Augustine Hailwood
- Succeeded by: Joseph Henderson

Personal details
- Born: 4 November 1858 Billingborough, Lincolnshire, England
- Died: 26 May 1931 (aged 72) London, England
- Party: Labour

Thomas Lowth (4 November 1858 – 26 May 1931) was the Member of Parliament (MP) for Ardwick, a constituency in Manchester, from 1922 until his death. He was a member of the Labour Party.

== Biography ==
Lowth was born at Billingborough, Lincolnshire on 4 November 1858. Having received elementary school education, he entered the railway service with the Manchester, Sheffield and Lincolnshire Railway in 1875 and moved to Manchester. He worked on the railway for 23 years, doing various jobs, then became the general secretary of the General Railway Workers' Union in 1898, a trade union he had helped to establish. Lowth died at the age of 72 in the Royal Northern Hospital in London.

Parliament of the United Kingdom
Preceded by Augustine Hailwood	Member of Parliament for Manchester Ardwick; 1922 – 1931	Succeeded by Joseph Henderson
Trade union offices
Preceded by Andrew Clark	General Secretary of the General Railway Workers' Union; 1898 – 1913	Succeeded by Position abolished
Preceded by New position	Assistant General Secretary of the National Union of Railwaymen; 1913–1919; With: Samuel Chorlton; Walter Hudson; J. H. Thomas (1913–1916)	Succeeded by Charlie Cramp as Industrial General Secretary
