= Leslie Lever, Baron Lever =

British Labour politician

The Lord Lever

Member of Parliament for Manchester Ardwick
- In office 23 February 1950 – 18 June 1970
- Preceded by: Joseph Henderson
- Succeeded by: Gerald Kaufman

Lord Mayor of Manchester
- In office 1957–1958
- Preceded by: Harry Sharp
- Succeeded by: James Edward Fitzsimons

Member of Manchester City Council
- Incumbent
- Assumed office 1932

Personal details
- Born: Leslie Maurice Lever; 29 April 1905 Manchester, England
- Died: 26 July 1977 (aged 72) Manchester, England
- Party: Labour
- Spouse: Ray Rosalia Levene
- Education: Manchester Grammar School University of Leeds
- Profession: Solicitor

Leslie Maurice Lever, Baron Lever, GCSG (29 April 1905 – 26 July 1977) was a British Labour politician. He was Member of Parliament for Manchester Ardwick from 1950 to 1970. A member of one of Manchester's most prominent Jewish political families his younger brother Harold Lever sat for the neighbouring Cheetham/Exchange seat, he built his public career on decades of unpaid legal work for the city's poor before entering the Commons

He served as Lord Mayor of Manchester (1957–58) and was knighted in 1970 for his philanthropic and public work.He was made a life peer as Baron Lever of Ardwick in the city of Manchester, in 1975. Made a peer five years after retiring from the Commons.

He was knighted by Popes John XXIII and Paul VI, as well as by the Queen in 1970 for his philanthropic work. He died in Manchester in 1977, aged 72.

== Early life and education ==
Lever was born on 29 April 1905, the son of Bernard Lever. He was educated at Manchester Grammar School before reading law at Leeds University. His younger sister and three younger brothers all trained as lawyers, and one of them, Harold Lever, went on to become a Labour MP and later Chancellor of the Duchy of Lancaster.

== Jewish communal life ==
Within the Jewish community, Lever served for some years as President of the Manchester and Salford Jewish Representative Council and as a delegate to the Board of Deputies of British Jews. He was a prominent supporter of the King David Schools and the Manchester Jewish Blind Society, particularly in dealing with public authorities on their behalf, and in his synagogue he was remembered for reciting the Book of Jonah each year on the Day of Atonement.

== Arms ==
Coat of arms of Leslie Lever, Baron Lever

Coronet
Coronet of a Baron
Crest
Within a Mural Crown Gules, masoned Or, a Globe thereon a Pair of Keys addorsed wards outwards Or, rising between the Bows thereof a Sun Gules.
Escutcheon
Gules, within an Orle of Bees volant proper, a Pair of Scales between three Escutcheons two and one Or, each charged with a Rose Gules, barbed and seeded proper.
Supporters
Dexter: a Lion sejant Or, mane and tail tuft Sable, gorged with a Collar Gules, charged with Pine Cones proper.

Sinister: a Bear sejant proper, gorged with a Collar Gules, charged with Pine Cones proper.

Parliament of the United Kingdom
Preceded by Joseph Henderson	Member of Parliament for Manchester Ardwick; 1950–1970	Succeeded by Gerald Kaufman
Honorary titles
Preceded by Harry Sharp	Lord Mayor of Manchester; 1957–1958	Succeeded by James Edward Fitzsimons
