= Institution of Railway Signal Engineers =

International professional body

The Institution of Railway Signal Engineers (IRSE) is a worldwide professional body for all those engaged or interested in railway signalling and telecommunications (S&T) and allied disciplines. Half its members are in the UK and half are outside it.

== Local sections ==
The IRSE is based in London, with international sections in:

- Australasia
- Hong Kong
- India
- Japan
- The Netherlands
- North America
- Singapore
- Southern Africa
- Switzerland
- Malaysia
- Indonesia
- France
- Thailand

In the UK:

- London and South East
- Midland and North Western
- Plymouth
- Scottish
- Western
- York

There is also a Minor Railways section specialising in railways that are not part of the national network, including industrial, tourist and heritage railways.

Additionally, a Younger Members section aims to contribute to and improve the development of new entrants into the sector. Benefits include the co-ordination of a number of events each year.

== Membership grades ==
Membership grade depends on a combination of the member's experience and any formal qualifications.

- Affiliate
- Accredited Technician
- Associate Member
- Member
- Fellow
- Companion

== Headquarters ==
The headquarters of the IRSE is in Westminster, London, in the offices of the Institution of Mechanical Engineers. The Chief Executive is Blane Judd BEng FCGI CEng FIET

== Notable members ==
Elsie Louisa Winterton became the IRSE's first woman member in 1923, whilst working as a draughtswoman for the Great Western Railway.

== IRSE Licensing Scheme ==
The IRSE Licensing Scheme was introduced in 1994 as a means of competence certification for people undertaking work in the railway signalling and telecommunications industry. Over 50 licence categories cover the design, installation, testing, maintenance and engineering management of both railway signalling and telecommunications. Possession of a licence (or evidence that you are working towards obtaining a licence) is essential for people who want to carry out S&T engineering work for Network Rail or London Underground.

== Publications ==
- IRSE News – an 11-edition journal featuring technical articles and papers and articles of general interest to the signalling community.
- Nock, O.S. (1962). Fifty Years of Railway Signalling. London: The Institution of Railway Signal Engineers.

== See also ==
- Brotherhood of Railroad Signalmen
- Railway Industry Association
- United Pointsmen and Signalmen's Society
