= George William Brown (trade unionist) =

British trade unionist and politician

George William Brown (born 1880) was a British trade unionist and politician.

Born in Kingston-upon-Hull, Brown became a train driver and relocated to Bristol. He joined the National Union of Railwaymen (NUR), and became its organising secretary in the city in 1912. He served as the president of Bristol Trades Council and as acting president of the Bristol district of the Labour Party from 1916 to 1918. In 1918, Brown was elected to Bristol City Council, serving for two years.

In 1933, Brown was elected as the assistant general secretary of the NUR, and he served until 1940.

Trade union offices
Preceded by John Marchbank	Assistant General Secretary of the National Union of Railwaymen; 1933–1940	Succeeded by John Benstead
