= William James Abraham =

British trade unionist and politician

William James Abraham (1883 – September 1927) was a British trade unionist and politician who served as president of the National Union of Railwaymen (NUR).

Born in Colmworth in Bedfordshire, Abraham became a railway signalman, based in Sheffield, and joined the Amalgamated Society of Railway Servants (ASRS). This became part of the NUR, and Abraham served as secretary of its Sheffield No.2 Branch for many years. This was an important branch, and by 1915 he was regarded as the most significant figure on the left wing of the union, leading arguments at its annual conference until the end of the decade. He also served as the president of the Sheffield Trades and Labour Council.

Abraham became politically active in Sheffield, joining the Labour Party, and was elected to Sheffield City Council in 1919. The following year, he was elected as national president of the NUR, then one of the largest unions in the country. At the 1922 United Kingdom general election, he stood in Bolton, sponsored by the NUR, taking only fourth place, with 15.8% of the vote.

Shortly after the election, Abraham's health worsened, and he retired from his political and trade union activity to his family's dairy farm in Colmworth. He died there in September 1927.

Trade union offices
Preceded by Charlie Cramp	President of the National Union of Railwaymen; 1920–1921	Succeeded by John Marchbank
