= Shawcross principle =

Independence of the UK Attorney-General

The Shawcross principle is an idea in the United Kingdom's Westminster system of government, whereby the Attorney-General is to be left to his or her own devices and judgments regarding whether or not to establish criminal proceedings. It relates to political pressure and cabinet government. It is named for Hartley Shawcross, Attorney General from 1945 to 1951.

== History ==
What is now known as the Shawcross principle was the subject of debate in the UK Parliament on 29 January 1951. In a lengthy defence of his conduct regarding an illegal strike, Attorney General Hartley Shawcross cited hundreds of years of precedent as to the firm foundation of his actions.

The principle (or doctrine) states:

- that the Attorney General must take into account matters of public interest,
- that assistance from cabinet colleagues must be limited to advice,
- that responsibility for the decision is that of the Attorney General alone, and
- that the government is not to put pressure on him or her.

The 1964 Rivard affair in Canada caused the sitting Attorney-General, Guy Favreau, to resign because of his non-prosecution of senior officials in the Pearson government over their attempted bribery of American officials in Rivard's case.

The Shawcross principle was cited by Australian Attorney-General Bob Ellicott who cited attempts by his boss, Malcolm Fraser, to control his discretion.

In 2004 in the context of the Tony Blair's invasion of Iraq, a whistleblower by the name of Katharine Gun risked prosecution under the Official Secrets Act. Lawyers for Gun, who was formerly a GCHQ translator, asked for disclosure of advice on the legality of the Iraq war given by Attorney-General Lord Goldsmith in his role as the government's legal adviser. Goldsmith said that he had conducted what is known as a "Shawcross exercise". Goldsmith sent a "Shawcross letter" to the foreign secretary, Jack Straw, who was responsible for GCHQ, advising him that HMG should decline to pursue Gun.

The Shawcross Principle was the judicial doctrine that the ethics commissioner Mario Dion said Canadian Prime Minister Justin Trudeau breached in the Jody Wilson-Raybould - SNC Lavalin bribery and fraud prosecution case.

== See also ==
- Prosecutorial discretion—A similar concept applying broadly at common law

== Commentary ==
- Keyzer, Patrick (2016). Public Sentinels: A Comparative Study of Australian Solicitors-General. Routledge. p. 312. ISBN 9781317073321.
- King, L. J. (November 1999). The Attorney-General, Politics and the Judiciary (PDF). Fourth Annual Colloquium of the Judicial Conference of Australia.
- McCarthy, Alana (December 2004). "The Evolution of the Role of the Attorney-General". Murdoch University Electronic Journal of Law. 11 (4). 23rd Annual Australia and New Zealand Law and History Society Conference: 30.
- Rosenberg, Marc (2009). "The Attorney General and the Prosecution Function on the Twenty-First Century". Queen's Law Journal. 43 (2). Kingston, Ontario: Queen's University: 813–862.
- Stenning, Phillip C. (2009). "Prosecutions, Politics and the Public Interest: Some Recent Developments in the United Kingdom, Canada and Elsewhere". Crim. L.Q. 55: 449.
- "The Decision to Prosecute" (PDF). Attorney-General for Newfoundland and Labrador. 1 October 2007.
- "Prosecutorial Independence – Continuity and Development" (PDF) (11). November 2008.
- Wong Yan Lung, The Secretary for Justice as the Protector of the Public Interest – Continuity and Development (2007) 37 HKLJ 319
