= 1931 Manchester Ardwick by-election =

UK Parliamentary by-election

The 1931 Manchester Ardwick by-election was held on 22 June 1931. The by-election was held due to the death of the incumbent Labour MP, Thomas Lowth. It was won by the Labour candidate Joseph Henderson.

== Previous result ==
General election 1929: Manchester Ardwick
Party	Candidate	Votes	%	±%
Labour	Thomas Lowth	20,041	60.3	+5.4
Unionist	Mary Latchford Kingsmill Jones	13,177	39.7	−5.4
Majority		6,864	20.6	+10.8
Turnout		33,218	72.0	−4.1
Registered electors		46,158		
Labour hold		Swing	+5.4	

== Result ==
By-election 1931: Manchester Ardwick
Party	Candidate	Votes	%	±%
Labour	Joseph Henderson	15,294	50.5	−9.8
Conservative	S.L. Elborne	14,980	49.5	+9.8
Majority		314	1.0	−19.6
Turnout		30,274	64.1	−7.9
Registered electors		47,252		
Labour hold		Swing	−9.8	

== Aftermath ==
Henderson's victory was short-lived. At the general election later in the year he was defeated by the Conservative Albert Fuller by over 5,000 votes. However he would regain the seat when he successfully challenged Fuller at the 1935 general election.
