= Leslie Spriggs =

British politician (1910-1990)

Member of Parliament for St Helens
- In office 12 June 1958 – 13 May 1983
- Preceded by: Hartley Shawcross
- Succeeded by: seat abolished

Personal details
- Born: 22 April 1910 Bolton, Lancashire
- Died: 22 May 1990 (aged 80) Thornton, Lancashire
- Party: Labour
- Spouse: Elfreda Spriggs

Leslie Spriggs (22 April 1910 – 22 May 1990) was a British Labour Party politician and trade unionist, MP for St Helens from 1958 until 1983.

Born in Bolton, Spriggs served in the Navy and then worked on the railways. It was whilst he was working for the railways that he became involved in socialism and the trade union movement. He joined the Labour Party in 1935, and the National Union of Railwaymen in 1937, becoming "president of the NUR North West district council political section, as well as vice president of the industrial section" during the early 1970s.

Until elected a Member of Parliament, Spriggs lived his adult life in Thornton, Lancashire and was a railways goods guard. In 1955 he unsuccessfully contested his local constituency, North Fylde, a Conservative safe seat. Three years later, he was chosen as the Labour candidate in the St Helens by-election following the resignation of Hartley Shawcross. He won the seat, which he would retain until its abolition in 1983, and moved to St. Helens. Following the seat's abolition he retired from politics, due to age and ill health, and moved back to Thornton. He had decided to retire in 1981, saying that being an MP was "a little too much when you've reached 72".

A career backbencher, Spriggs was rarely in the public eye, and "often said it did not necessarily follow that those MPs who were rarely in the headlines were not representing their constituency properly". He believed that "behind the scenes" activity often produced the best results. One example of this was the price agreement he secured with foreign glassmakers that saved "countless" jobs in his constituency. He supported proposals for a float glass plant at Pilkington's St Helens facility, which he claimed lost him votes in the October 1974 general election. Despite this claim, he only received one less vote than in the previous election.

Spriggs had ill health for much of his life. He suffered rheumatoid arthritis, as well as having had several heart attacks. As early as 1970 rumours circulated that he was to stand down. A heart attack he suffered in 1974 became the subject of an anecdote by MP Joe Ashton, illustrating the sometimes extreme lengths party whips would go to in cases of division:

I remember the famous case of Leslie Spriggs, the then-Member for St. Helens. We had a tied vote and he was brought to the House in an ambulance having suffered a severe heart attack. The two Whips went out to look in the ambulance and there was Leslie Spriggs laid there as though he was dead. I believe that John Stradling Thomas said to Joe Harper, "How do we know that he is alive?" So he leaned forward, turned the knob on the heart machine, the green light went around, and he said, "There, you've lost—it's 311" [the vote had been tied 310–310]. That is an absolutely true story. It is the sort of nonsense that used to happen. No one believes it, but it is true.

Ironically, Harper died only four years later in 1978 and Spriggs outlived him by over a decade before dying in 1990.

Parliament of the United Kingdom
Preceded by Hartley Shawcross	Member of Parliament for St Helens; 1958–1983	Constituency abolished
