= John Benstead (trade unionist) =

British trade unionist (1897–1979)

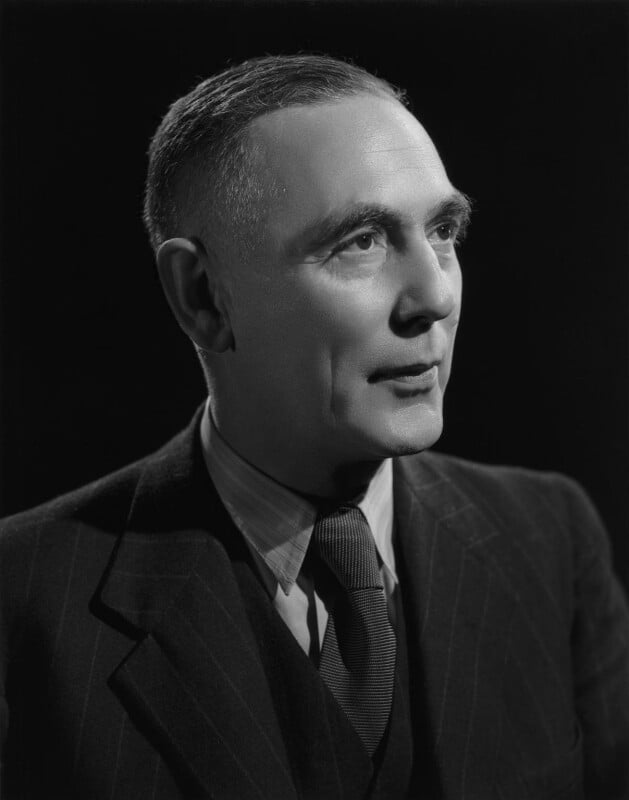
Benstead in 1947

John Benstead (10 January 1897 – 24 January 1979) was a British trade unionist.

Benstead grew up in Peterborough, where he attended the King's School. During World War I, he served with the Royal Navy.

After the war, Benstead found work on the railways, and joined the National Union of Railwaymen (NUR). He also joined the Labour Party, serving as a councillor and as deputy mayor of Peterborough. In 1932, he was selected as the party's Prospective Parliamentary Candidate for Ashton-under-Lyne, although he did not ultimately stand.

In 1943, Benstead was elected as the NUR's general secretary, also serving on the General Council of the Trades Union Congress. In 1946, he was additionally elected as President of the International Transport Workers' Federation. However, in 1947, he resigned from his union posts to become deputy chairman of the British Transport Commission.

Benstead also served on a number of committees, including the Advisory Council for Scientific and Industrial Research, Colonial and Economic Development Council, and the 1946 Royal Commission on the Press. He was made a Commander of the Order of the British Empire in 1946, was knighted in 1953. He retired in 1961, and served as a deputy lieutenant of Cambridgeshire in 1967.

Trade union offices
Preceded by George William Brown	Assistant General Secretary of the National Union of Railwaymen; 1940 – 1943	Succeeded by Jim Figgins
Preceded by John Marchbank	General Secretary of the National Union of Railwaymen; 1943 – 1948	Succeeded by Jim Figgins
Preceded by Charles Lindley	President of the International Transport Workers' Federation; 1946 – 1947	Succeeded by Omer Becu
