= Help (dog) =

Charity raising Scotch collie dog

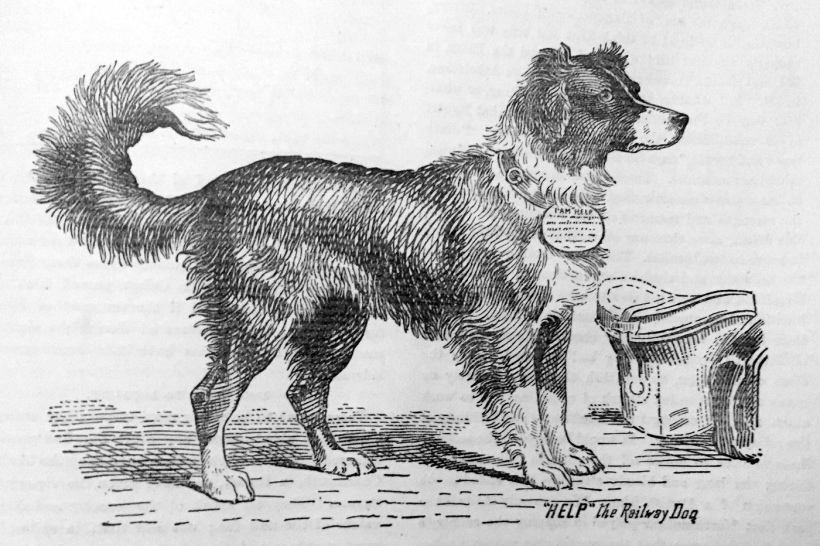
- Help, drawn in 1889 by Wilson Hepple
- Breed: Scotch collie
- Born: 1878; Near Hailes Castle in East Lothian
- Died: 1891 (aged 12–13)
- Resting place: Brighton railway station
- Employer: Orphans Fund of the Amalgamated Society of Railway Servants (ASRS)
- Years active: 1880-1890
- Known for: Railway collecting dog
- Owner: John Climpson
- Awards: Bristol Dog Show 1884, silver medal

Help (1878 – December 1891) was a Scotch collie dog which gained fame through being used to collect money for charity.

Bred in the vicinity of Hailes Castle in East Lothian by William Riddell, in 1880 Help was donated to John Climpson. Climpson, who was the long-serving guard of the night boat train to Newhaven on the London, Brighton and South Coast Railway, had previously had the idea of using a dog to obtain donations for the Orphans Fund of the Amalgamated Society of Railway Servants (ASRS). He did not provide Help with any special training, the dog simply being fitted with a wooden collecting box on his back, and a silver collar and medal. The medal was inscribed: "I am Help, the railway dog of England, and travelling agent for the orphans of railwaymen who are killed on duty. My office is at 306, City Road [later 55, Colebrooke Row], London, where subscriptions will be thankfully received and duly acknowledged".

While Help often travelled with Climpson, he was also lent out to other guards to undertake collections on their routes. By the time of his death, it was claimed that he had travelled every railway line in Britain and visited all the major towns, and had also travelled twice to France, in the course of his travels raising more than £1,000. He also attended many of the conferences of the ASRS.

Help was awarded a silver medal at the Bristol Dog Show of 1884, was the subject of numerous paintings and sketches, and appeared on a commemorative badge. He was retired in 1890, settling in Newhaven. He died in late 1891, the Railway Review claiming in his obituary that he was "without doubt the best known dog in the United Kingdom". Following his death, he was stuffed and placed on display at Brighton railway station.

Help was succeeded by numerous other railway collecting dogs, including Prince, based in Croydon, Nell, based in Bournemouth, Tim, based at Paddington, and Basingstoke Jack.

== See also ==
- List of individual dogs
