= Charlie Cramp =

British trade unionist and political activist

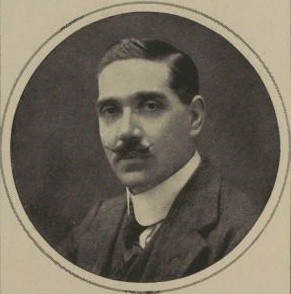
Cramp in 1920

Concemore Thomas Thwaites Cramp (19 March 1876 – 13 July 1933), known as Charlie Cramp, was a British trade unionist and political activist.

Born in Staplehurst in Kent, Cramp worked as a gardener, before gaining employment with the Midland Railway. He worked as a porter based in Shipley and then Rotherham, where he was promoted to become a guard, and joined the Amalgamated Society of Railway Servants (ASRS). Soon after, he moved to Sheffield, where he married an Elizabeth Baker, also from Staplehurst.

Cramp was an effective trade unionist, and was elected to the executive of the ASRS in 1911, immediately prior to a major strike. The ASRS merged with other unions in 1913 to form the National Union of Railwaymen (NUR). Cramp maintained his position on its executive, working during World War I to oppose further strikes, and was elected as President of the NUR in 1917. He was also appointed as Industrial General Secretary of the union, a full-time position in which he was seen as deputy to General Secretary James Henry Thomas.

Cramp was also active in the Labour Party. He stood unsuccessfully for it in Middlesbrough West at the 1918 general election. He was a member of its National Executive Committee from 1919 until 1929, and served as Chair of the Labour Party in 1924/5. The following year, he was elected as President of the International Transport Workers' Federation. In 1929, he was elected to the General Council of the Trades Union Congress, serving for three years, thereby swapping positions with Thomas. In 1931, Thomas was given a ministerial position, and Cramp took over as General Secretary, but he died suddenly two years later, aged 57.

Trade union offices
Preceded by Albert Bellamy	President of the National Union of Railwaymen; 1917–1919	Succeeded by William James Abraham
Preceded by Samuel Chorlton; Walter Hudson; Thomas Lowth as Assistant Secretaries	Industrial General Secretary of the National Union of Railwaymen; 1920–1931	Succeeded by John Marchbank as Assistant General Secretary
Preceded by Robert Williams	President of the International Transport Workers' Federation; 1925–1933	Succeeded by Charles Lindley
Preceded by James Henry Thomas	General Secretary of the National Union of Railwaymen; 1931–1933	Succeeded by John Marchbank
Preceded by William C. Robinson and Robert Barrie Walker	Trades Union Congress representative to the American Federation of Labour; 1924; With: Alonzo Swales	Succeeded by A. A. Purcell and Ben Smith
Party political offices
Preceded by Arthur Henderson	President of the Labour and Socialist International; 1924–1925	Succeeded by Arthur Henderson
Preceded by Ramsay MacDonald	Chair of the Labour Party; 1924–1925	Succeeded by Robert Williams
