= Elsie Louisa Deacon =

British railway draughtswoman

Elsie Louisa Deacon (née Winterton)
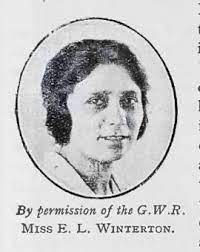
- Born: 27 February 1897; Reading
- Died: 4 September 1984 (aged 87); Reading
- Occupation: draughtswoman

Elsie Louisa Winterton, also known as Elsie Louisa Deacon (27 February 1897 — 4 September 1984) was a draughtswoman for the Great Western Railway (GWR) who became the first woman member of the United Kingdom's Institution of Railway Signal Engineers in 1923.

== Early life ==
Winterton was born in Reading, Berkshire on 27 February 1897 to parents Rose Bray and Joseph Winterton. Her father was a tinsmith at Huntley & Palmers biscuit factory. The sixth daughter of nine children, Winterton spent her childhood at 112 Cumberland Road, Reading. On the 1911 census, Winterton was 14 years of age and listed as an apprentice dressmaker.

== Career ==
Winterton was admitted to the drawing office at GWR in 1915 and two years later was appointed draughtswoman, a skilled technical role within the engineering field. Her two younger sisters later joined GWR. She had been engaged in making wiring diagrams of electric signalling appliances for track circuits and signal and point machines for use on the railways.

While working at GWR, she enrolled at University College, Reading where she passed examinations in machine construction and drawing, electricity and magnetism, applied mechanics, general physics and mathematics. Winterton was awarded the Owen Ridley prize for machine construction in 1919-20 (still awarded today by the Fine Art Department), and the Wells Prize for science in 1921–22.

Until the Sex Disqualification (Removal) Act 1919 became law on 23 December 1919, women were barred from joining the professional institutions. The institutions expected prospective members to pass stringent examinations to qualify for membership. In 1923, Winterton was elected as an associate member (equivalent to member grade today) of the Institution of Railway Signal Engineers, becoming its first female member (an achievement widely reported in syndicated newspaper reports in the United States), (Note: News of Winterton's membership was reported in, among others, Wisconsin's Leader-Telegram and the Nashville Banner in Tennessee (both on 22 January 1924), the Brattleboro Reformer in Vermont (9 February 1924), The Times of Shreveport, Louisiana (11 April 1924), and the Huntington Press in Huntington, Indiana (3 June 1924).) and attending the IRSE's annual dinner in London. She was described in one newspaper as knowing "as much about physics, mathematics and electricity as the average girl know about jazz and cream cakes".

She attended the IRSE's summer meeting in Southampton in 1924, and, in July 1925, she attended the IRSE's first international Convention in Brussels, Belgium, later (1929) travelling to the IRSE's summer convention in the Netherlands.

Through her work at GWR and involvement with the IRSE, she met her husband, Edward Charles Deacon (1898-1939), and on 14 June 1930 they were married in Caversham. As was usual at the time, she left employment. However, after her husband died (on 11 October 1939 at the Royal Berkshire Hospital) leaving her a widow with two small children to support, Elsie Deacon rejoined the GWR Signal Department in Reading, remaining in employment there as a draughtswoman until retiring in 1962 aged 65.

Elsie's sister Ella Winterton (b. 1900) passed the entrance exam and joined GWR in 1916 and had a long career as a draughtswoman in Reading and later in Paddington. Another sister Doris (b. 1904) joined GWR in 1929 and worked at Paddington station as a tracer.

== Family, death ==
The couple had two children: Jill Margaret Rose Deacon (1932-2013) and Christopher Edward W Deacon (1938-2002). In the register of her husband's will, Elsie Deacon was living at 40 Highmoor Road, Reading and her occupation is listed as unpaid domestic duties.

Deacon died on 4 September 1984 at the Battle Hospital, Reading. The National Probate Calendar states that Elsie Louisa Deacon of Warren House, St Peters Av, Caversham, Reading had a wealth at death of £40,000.
