= Jim Figgins =

Scottish trade unionist

James Hugh Blair Figgins (8 March 1893 – 27 December 1956) was a Scottish trade unionist.

Figgins was born in Largs in Ayrshire, and began working on the railways, initially as a ticket collector, then later as a signalman. During World War I, he was a conscientious objector. He came to prominence as a member of the National Union of Railwaymen (NUR), first attending its annual general meeting in 1924. In 1931, he was elected to the union's executive, and from 1938 he worked full-time for the union, as a district organiser.

In 1943, Figgins became the assistant to John Benstead, the union's general secretary. When Benstead resigned, in 1948, Figgins was elected as his replacement, serving until his retirement in 1953. He was also elected to replace Benstead on the General Council of the Trades Union Congress. During this time, he was associated with the left wing of the Labour Party, and frequently disagreed with his counterparts in the Railway Clerks' Association and the Associated Society of Locomotive Engineers and Firemen.

Trade union offices
Preceded by John Benstead	Assistant General Secretary of the National Union of Railwaymen; 1943 – 1948	Succeeded by Jim Campbell
Preceded by John Benstead	General Secretary of the National Union of Railwaymen; 1948 – 1953	Succeeded by Jim Campbell
