= Frank Lane (trade unionist) =

Frank Lane (died 1978 or 1979) was a British trade unionist, who served on the National Executive Committee of the Labour Party.

Lane joined the National Union of Railwaymen (NUR) and served on its executive committee from 1950 until 1952, then again from 1956 until 1958, and from 1962 until 1964.

In 1967, Lane was elected as President of the NUR, and he also won election to the National Executive Committee of the Labour Party. His term as president ended in 1970, and he died at the end of the decade.

Trade union offices
Preceded by Frank Donlon	President of the National Union of Railwaymen; 1967–1969	Succeeded by George Chambers
