= 1958 St Helens by-election =

UK Parliamentary by-election

The 1958 St Helens by-election to the House of Commons of the United Kingdom was held on 12 June 1958. It was held due to the vacation of the seat by the incumbent Labour Member of Parliament, Sir Hartley Shawcross. It was retained by the Labour candidate Leslie Spriggs.

== Background ==
St Helens had been represented in Parliament by Sir Hartley Shawcross since the 1945 general election. However he had become increasingly disillusioned with the Labour Party to the point where he was called by the journalist Bernard Levin "Sir Shortly Floorcross". Hartley stated he wished to vacate his seat citing disillusionment with party politics. Shawcross asked to be appointed as the Crown Steward and Bailiff of the Manor of Northstead, an office of profit under the Crown which disqualifies people from being MPs as resignation is not allowed. Shawcross was later elevated to the House of Lords as a Crossbench life peer.

== Election ==
Carlisle was contesting his first election for the Conservative Party. Spriggs was contesting his second election after unsuccessfully standing for North Fylde three years earlier. He was selected as the Labour Party candidate following Tom Driberg bringing media attention to the selections by alleging religious discrimination in the shortlist of candidates and Spriggs was seen as the "safe" option. As St Helens is considered a safe Labour seat, Spriggs won the election and would represent St Helens until 1983. Carlisle would later get elected as the MP for Runcorn.

St Helens by-election, 1958
Party	Candidate	Votes	%	±%
Labour	Leslie Spriggs	26,405	64.7	+0.4
Conservative	Mark Carlisle	14,411	35.3	−0.4
Majority		11,994	29.4	+0.8
Turnout		40,816		
Labour hold		Swing		
