= List of Stephen F. Austin Lumberjacks in the NFL draft =

This is a list of Stephen F. Austin Lumberjacks football players in the NFL draft.

== Key ==
B	Back	K	Kicker	NT	Nose tackle
C	Center	LB	Linebacker	FB	Fullback
DB	Defensive back	P	Punter	HB	Halfback
DE	Defensive end	QB	Quarterback	WR	Wide receiver
DT	Defensive tackle	RB	Running back	G	Guard
E	End	T	Offensive tackle	TE	Tight end

== Selections ==
Year	Round	Pick	Overall	Player	Team	Position
1950	15	6	189	Bill Roberson	New York Giants	T
1952	9	7	104	Bobby Cross	Chicago Bears	T
1952	18	2	207	Howard Tisdale	Green Bay Packers	T
1952	26	8	309	Buddy Terry	Detroit Lions	E
1956	22	5	258	Jim Murphy	Chicago Cardinals	T
1958	16	10	191	George Shirkey	San Francisco 49ers	T
1960	20	2	230	Royce Shelton	Los Angeles Rams	B
1965	10	10	136	Bud Marshall	Green Bay Packers	T
1968	6	13	151	Frank Lane	St. Louis Cardinals	LB
1968	10	9	255	James Greer	Cleveland Browns	DE
1970	9	7	215	David King	Philadelphia Eagles	LB
1970	13	25	337	Robert Pearce	Minnesota Vikings	DB
1970	14	8	346	Mark Moseley	Philadelphia Eagles	K
1971	15	4	368	Andy Hopkins	Houston Oilers	RB
1973	11	1	261	Lawrence Eaglin	Houston Oilers	DB
1974	15	10	374	Sam Hunt	New England Patriots	LB
1984u	1	25	25	Todd Fowler	Dallas Cowboys	TE
1984u	3	26	82	Duan Hanks	Miami Dolphins	WR
1986	6	16	154	Floyd Dixon	Atlanta Falcons	WR
1990	4	26	107	David Whitmore	New York Giants	DB
1990	5	6	115	Larry Centers	Phoenix Cardinals	RB
1990	10	5	253	Anthony Landry	New England Patriots	RB
1990	12	3	307	Todd Hammel	Tampa Bay Buccaneers	QB
1995	2	2	34	Terrance Shaw	San Diego Chargers	DB
1996	7	39	248	Joey Wylie	Oakland Raiders	G
1997	7	8	209	Anthony DeGrate	Tampa Bay Buccaneers	DT
1998	2	29	59	Mikhael Ricks	San Diego Chargers	WR
1998	3	11	72	Jeremiah Trotter	Philadelphia Eagles	LB
2001	5	19	150	Derrick Blaylock	Kansas City Chiefs	RB
2002	7	25	236	Wes Pate	Baltimore Ravens	QB
2009	6	33	206	Dominique Edison	Tennessee Titans	WR
2011	7	25	228	Jabara Williams	St. Louis Rams	LB
2018	4	35	135	John Franklin-Myers	Los Angeles Rams	DE
2023	5	31	166	B. J. Thompson	Kansas City Chiefs	LB
2026	5	23	163	Charles Demmings	Minnesota Vikings	CB
