= General Railway Workers' Union =

Former trade union of the United Kingdom

Union logo

The General Railway Workers' Union was a trade union representing low-paid workers on railways of the United Kingdom.

Following the London Dock strike of 1889, a group of low-paid railway workers were inspired to join a trade union. They hoped to join the Amalgamated Society of Railway Servants (ASRS), but its membership fees were beyond their means, and the ASRS refused to consider lower rates of fees. As a result, before the end of the year, the workers founded their own society, the "General Railway Workers' Union".

The union saw itself as part of the New Unionism movement. In contrast to most unions of the day, it did not offer any welfare benefits, and focused solely on winning improved pay and conditions for its members. It was immediately successful in recruiting 14,000 members, but due to turnover of employment, this fell to only 4,000 by 1895. That year, former members of the small Scottish Railwaymen's Union transferred in.

In 1898, the union came close to negotiating a merger with the ASRS. Disappointed by this failure, the general secretary, Andrew Clark, resigned, along with some of the other full-time staff. Thomas Lowth was elected as Clark's replacement, but membership did not increase until the middle of the 1900s, bringing the union close to collapse. Finally, membership, began increasing, and reached 20,000 by 1913. That year, it merged with the ASRS and the United Pointsmen and Signalmen's Society to form the National Union of Railwaymen.

== General Secretaries ==
1889: Campion Watson
1893: Andrew Clark
1898: Thomas Lowth
