= Manchester Ardwick =

Parliamentary constituency in the United Kingdom, 1918–1983

- Former borough constituency for the House of Commons

1918–1983
- Created from: Manchester East, Manchester North West and Manchester North East
- Replaced by: Manchester Central and Manchester Gorton

Manchester Ardwick was a parliamentary constituency in the city of Manchester which returned one Member of Parliament (MP) to the House of Commons of the Parliament of the United Kingdom. Elections were held by the first past the post voting system.

The constituency was established for the 1918 general election and abolished for the 1983 general election.

== Boundaries ==
Manchester Ardwick in Lancashire, boundaries used 1974–1983

1918–1950: The County Borough of Manchester wards of Ardwick, New Cross, and St Mark's.

1950–1955: The County Borough of Manchester wards of Ardwick, Longsight, New Cross, and St Mark's.

1955–1974: The County Borough of Manchester wards of Ardwick, Longsight, Rusholme, St Luke's, and St Mark's.

1974–1983: The County Borough of Manchester wards of Ardwick, Levenshulme, Longsight, and Rusholme.

== Members of Parliament ==
Election	Member	Party
1918	Augustine Hailwood	Coalition Conservative
1922	Thomas Lowth	Labour
1931 by-election	Joseph Henderson	Labour
1931	Albert Fuller	Conservative
1935	Joseph Henderson	Labour
1950	Leslie Lever, later Baron Lever	Labour
1970	Gerald Kaufman	Labour
1983	constituency abolished	

== Election results ==
=== Election in the 1910s ===
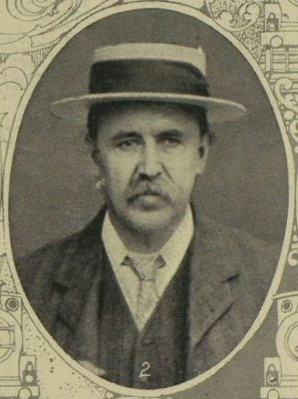
Lowth

General election 1918: Manchester Ardwick
Party		Candidate	Votes	%	±%
C	Unionist	Augustine Hailwood	8,641	48.5	
	Labour	Thomas Lowth	5,670	31.8	
	National	H.M. Stephenson	3,510	19.7	
Majority			2,971	16.7	
Turnout			17,821	47.9	
Registered electors			37,214		
	Unionist win (new seat)				
C indicates candidate endorsed by the coalition government.

=== Election in the 1920s ===
General election 1922: Manchester Ardwick
Party	Candidate	Votes	%	±%
Labour	Thomas Lowth	14,031	52.3	+20.5
Unionist	Augustine Hailwood	12,777	47.7	−0.8
Majority		1,254	4.6	N/A
Turnout		26,808	71.4	+23.5
Registered electors		37,572		
Labour gain from Unionist		Swing	+10.7	

General election 1923: Manchester Ardwick
Party	Candidate	Votes	%	±%
Labour	Thomas Lowth	15,673	60.4	+8.1
Unionist	Augustine Hailwood	10,266	39.6	−8.1
Majority		5,407	20.8	+16.2
Turnout		25,939	69.3	−2.1
Registered electors		37,404		
Labour hold		Swing	+8.1	

General election 1924: Manchester Ardwick
Party	Candidate	Votes	%	±%
Labour	Thomas Lowth	15,941	54.9	−5.5
Unionist	Mary Kingsmill Jones	13,115	45.1	+5.5
Majority		2,826	9.8	−11.0
Turnout		29,056	76.1	+6.8
Registered electors		38,188		
Labour hold		Swing	−5.5	

General election 1929: Manchester Ardwick
Party	Candidate	Votes	%	±%
Labour	Thomas Lowth	20,041	60.3	+5.4
Unionist	Mary Kingsmill Jones	13,177	39.7	−5.4
Majority		6,864	20.6	+10.8
Turnout		33,218	72.0	−4.1
Registered electors		46,158		
Labour hold		Swing	+5.4	

=== Election in the 1930s ===
1931 Manchester Ardwick by-election
Party	Candidate	Votes	%	±%
Labour	Joseph Henderson	15,294	50.5	−9.8
Conservative	Sidney Lipscomb Elborne	14,980	49.5	+9.8
Majority		314	1.0	−19.6
Turnout		30,274	64.1	−7.9
Registered electors		47,252		
Labour hold		Swing	−9.8	

General election 1931: Manchester Ardwick
Party	Candidate	Votes	%	±%
Conservative	Albert Fuller	21,630	58.0	+18.3
Labour	Joseph Henderson	15,664	42.0	−18.3
Majority		5,966	16.0	N/A
Turnout		37,294	78.3	+6.3
Registered electors		47,658		
Conservative gain from Labour		Swing	+18.3	

General election 1935: Manchester Ardwick
Party	Candidate	Votes	%	±%
Labour	Joseph Henderson	16,364	52.9	+10.9
Conservative	Albert Fuller	14,556	47.1	−10.9
Majority		1,808	5.8	N/A
Turnout		30,920	71.4	−6.9
Registered electors		43,314		
Labour gain from Conservative		Swing	+10.9	

=== Election in the 1940s ===
General election 1945: Manchester Ardwick
Party	Candidate	Votes	%	±%
Labour	Joseph Henderson	14,360	64.0	+11.1
Conservative	Nellie Beer	8,093	36.0	−11.1
Majority		6,267	28.0	+22.2
Turnout		22,453	68.2	−3.2
Registered electors		32,899		
Labour hold		Swing	+11.1	

=== Elections in the 1950s ===
General election 1950: Manchester Ardwick
Party	Candidate	Votes	%	±%
Labour	Leslie Lever	22,628	55.84	−8.12
Conservative	Edwin Hodson	17,895	44.16	+8.12
Majority		4,733	11.68	−16.23
Turnout		40,523		
Labour hold		Swing	-8.12	

General election 1951: Manchester Ardwick
Party	Candidate	Votes	%	±%
Labour	Leslie Lever	22,150	55.54	−0.30
Conservative	Edwin Hodson	17,732	44.46	+0.30
Majority		4,418	11.08	−0.60
Turnout		39,882		
Labour hold		Swing	-0.30	

General election 1955: Manchester Ardwick
Party	Candidate	Votes	%	±%
Labour	Leslie Lever	22,822	52.39	−3.15
Conservative	George Hampson	20,740	47.61	+3.15
Majority		2,082	4.78	−6.30
Turnout		43,562		
Labour hold		Swing	-3.15	

General election 1959: Manchester Ardwick
Party	Candidate	Votes	%	±%
Labour	Leslie Lever	24,134	58.12	+5.73
Conservative	Harry Sharp	17,392	41.88	−5.73
Majority		6,742	16.24	+11.46
Turnout		41,526		
Labour hold		Swing	+5.73	

=== Elections in the 1960s ===
General election 1964: Manchester Ardwick
Party	Candidate	Votes	%	±%
Labour	Leslie Lever	20,248	61.21	+3.09
Conservative	William Arthur Peete Manser	12,834	38.79	−3.09
Majority		7,414	22.42	+6.18
Turnout		33,082		
Labour hold		Swing	+3.09	

General election 1966: Manchester Ardwick
Party	Candidate	Votes	%	±%
Labour	Leslie Lever	17,274	63.23	+2.02
Conservative	John Gordon Cluff	9,251	33.86	−4.93
Union Movement	Frank T Hamley	796	2.91	New
Majority		8,023	29.37	+6.95
Turnout		27,321	59.1	
Labour hold		Swing	+3.48	

=== Elections in the 1970s ===
General election 1970: Manchester Ardwick
Party	Candidate	Votes	%	±%
Labour	Gerald Kaufman	13,728	56.1	−7.1
Conservative	Ian Keith Paley	10,726	43.9	+10.0
Majority		3,002	12.2	−17.2
Turnout		24,454	59.9	+0.8
Labour hold		Swing	−8.6	

General election February 1974: Manchester Ardwick
Party	Candidate	Votes	%	±%
Labour	Gerald Kaufman	16,110	50.48	−5.66
Conservative	Ruslyn Hargreaves	11,215	35.14	−8.72
Liberal	Anthony Maffia	4,590	14.38	New
Majority		4,895	15.34	+3.06
Turnout		31,915		
Labour hold		Swing	+1.8	

General election October 1974: Manchester Ardwick
Party	Candidate	Votes	%	±%
Labour	Gerald Kaufman	15,632	55.52	+5.04
Conservative	Ruslyn Hargreaves	8,849	31.43	−3.71
Liberal	Gordon M. R. Willmott	3,675	13.05	−1.33
Majority		6,783	24.09	+8.75
Turnout		28,156		
Labour hold		Swing	+4.37	

General election 1979: Manchester Ardwick
Party	Candidate	Votes	%	±%
Labour	Gerald Kaufman	17,235	56.7	+1.2
Conservative	William R. Swan	9,963	32.8	+1.4
Liberal	Peter Thomson	2,934	9.7	−3.3
Socialist Unity	Jeff S. West	287	0.94	New
Majority		7,272	23.9	−0.2
Turnout		30,419		
Labour hold		Swing	-0.09	
