= United Pointsmen and Signalmen's Society =

Former trade union of the United Kingdom

The United Pointsmen and Signalmen's Society was a union representing railway workers in the United Kingdom.

The union was founded in 1880 in Bolton, when it was known as the Pointsmen's Mutual Aid and Sick Society. Initially very small, it had only 113 members by 1881, but then grew steadily, reaching 1,437 members by 1900, and around 4,000 by 1913. That year, it merged with the General Railway Workers' Union and the Amalgamated Society of Railway Servants to form the National Union of Railwaymen (NUR).

The union participated in the National Railway strike of 1911. At the time, its general secretary was Samuel Chorlton, who later became an assistant general secretary of the NUR.

== See also ==
- Brotherhood of Railroad Signalmen
- Institution of Railway Signal Engineers
