= List of mayors of Cardiff =

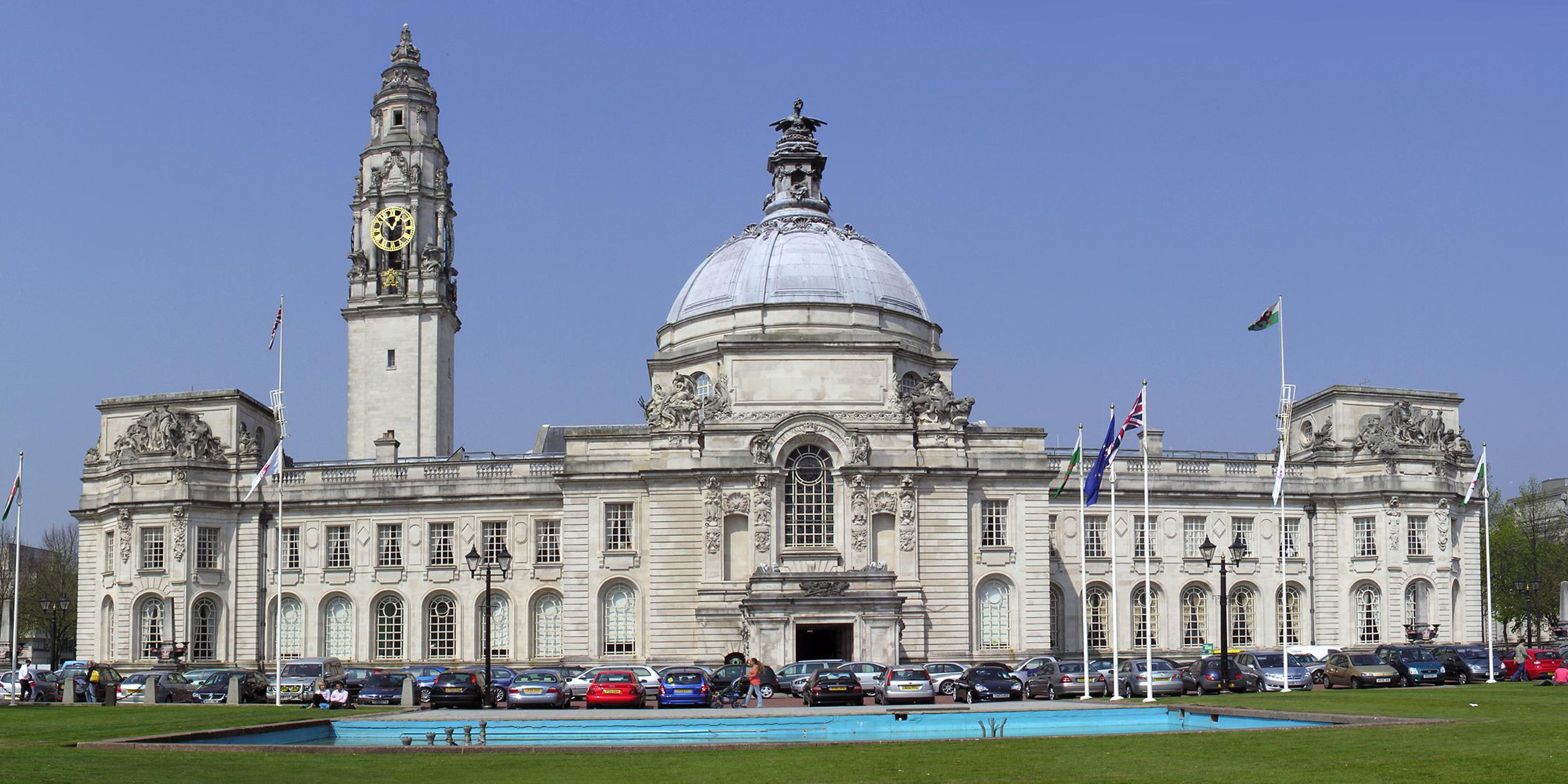
Cardiff City Hall

This is a list of mayors of Cardiff, Wales. The first mayor recorded for Cardiff was in 1126 though the title was generally given to the Constable or military governor of Cardiff Castle. The first elected Mayor of Cardiff took office in 1835 (elected by the members of the council), the same year the first council elections were held. When Cardiff was granted city status in 1905 the post holder was given the title Lord Mayor (Welsh: Arglwydd Faer). The Lord Mayor of Cardiff is considered to be the first citizen of Wales and since 1956 has enjoyed the style of The Right Honourable.

== History ==
The first mayor of Cardiff is listed by the County Borough Records as Ralph "Prepositus de Kardi" who took up office in 1126. In 1835, Thomas Revel Guest became the first elected mayor of Cardiff when the first council elections were held. When Cardiff was granted city status in 1905 Cardiff's First Citizen became lord mayor. Robert Hughes, the mayor in 1904, was re-elected to become Cardiff's first lord mayor in the following year. The lord mayor was granted the right to the style "The Right Honourable." The lord mayor now bears the style "The Right Honourable the Lord Mayor of Cardiff".

In 1999 a new system was introduced whereby the leader of the council could also serve as mayor for the duration of the council without re-election. This led to Russell Goodway serving as both council leader and mayor from 1999 to 2003. From 2003 the mayoralty reverted to a separate role, elected annually.

The official residence of the Lord Mayor of Cardiff was the Mansion House, Cardiff, although the Lord Mayors have not lived there since 1971.

== Elected mayors since 1835 ==
The years given are for when each mayor took office. Most mayoral terms extended into the following year.

- 1836: Thomas Revell Guest, from 1 January Also Judge of the Borough Court of Record.
- 1836: Charles Crofts Williams, from 9 November
- 1837: Henry Morgan
- 1838: Charles Crofts Williams
- 1839: Richard Reece
- 1840: David Evans
- 1841: James Lewis
- 1842: Charles Crofts Williams
- 1843: John Moore
- 1844: William Jonas Watson, who died in office in October but was not immediately replaced
- 1845: Richard Reece
- 1846: James Lewis
- 1847: Richard Lewis Reece
- 1848: Walter Coffin, later a member of parliament for Cardiff
- 1849: Charles Vachell
- 1850: William Bird
- 1851: Griffith Phillips
- 1852: William Williams
- 1853: John Batchelor, a Liberal mayor dubbed "Friend of Freedom"
- 1854: David Lewis
- 1855: Charles Vachell
- 1856: Sydney Dan Jenkins
- 1857: Charles Crofts Williams
- 1858: Charles Crofts Williams
- 1859: William Alexander
- 1860: Charles Williams David
- 1861: Charles Williams David
- 1862: John Bird
- 1863: John Bird
- 1864: James Pride
- 1865: William Bradley Watkins
- 1866: Charles Williams David
- 1867: Richard Lewis Reece
- 1868: Thomas Evans
- 1869: Edward Whiffen
- 1870: Charles Williams David
- 1871: Charles Williams David
- 1872: Henry Bowen
- 1873: William Vachell (father of Ada Vachell)
- 1874: Daniel Jones
- 1875: Daniel Jones
- 1876: Joseph Elliott
- 1877: William Taylor
- 1878: Daniel Lewis
- 1879: John MacConnochie
- 1880: Rees Jones
- 1881: Alfred Thomas or Sir Alfred Gaius Augustus Stone
- 1882: Sir Alfred Gaius Augustus Stone
- 1883: Robert Bird - Father of (Sir) Charles Bird, Lord Mayor in 1910
- 1884: Andrew Fulton
- 1885: David Edgar Jones MD
- 1886: Sir Morgan Morgan (knighted while in office)
- 1887: Thomas Windsor Jacobs
- 1888: David Jones
- 1889: William Sanders
- 1890: John Patrick Crichton-Stuart, Marquess of Bute
- 1891: Thomas Rees
- 1892: William Edmund Vaughan
- 1893: William John Trounce
- 1894: Patrick William Carey
- 1895: Robert George, Baron Windsor
- 1896: Ebenezer Beavan
- 1897: Joseph Ramsdale
- 1898: Thomas Morel or Thomas More {knighted in 1899)
- 1899: Samuel Arthur Brain, founder of Brains Brewery in 1882
- 1900: Thomas Andrews – Cllr John Jenkins, a councillor for 10 years, had initially been elected to the post. It was the first time the position of mayor had been offered to a Labour councillor. However, Jenkins refused the post and left the council chamber. Andrews was elected following a second vote.
- 1901: Frank John Beavan
- 1902: Edward Thomas (Liberal party)
- 1903: John Jenkins
- 1904: Robert Hughes

== Lord mayors since 1905 ==
- 1905: Robert Hughes, the sitting mayor who was (re)elected Lord Mayor in 1905
- 1906: Sir William Smith Crossman (knighted while still in office by King Edward VII on his visit to Cardiff on 13 July 1907)
- 1907: (Sir) Illtyd Thomas (knighted after leaving office)
- 1908: Lewis Morgan
- 1909: John Chappell
- 1910: (Sir) Charles Hayward Bird (knighted after leaving office) - son of Robert Bird, Mayor in 1883.
- 1911: Sir John Wesley Courtis (knighted while still in office)
- 1912: Morgan Thomas
- 1913: James Robinson
- 1914: John Thomas Richards
- 1915: Dr Robert James Smith
- 1916: Joseph Stanfield
- 1917: William Roberts
- 1918: (Sir) Amos Child Kirk (knighted after leaving office)
- 1919: George Frederick Forsdike
- 1920: James Taylor
- 1921: Francis Harold Turnbull
- 1922: John James Edgerton Biggs
- 1923: Sydney Osborne Jenkins
- 1924: William Hampton Pethybridge
- 1925: William Francis
- 1926: William Grey
- 1927: Arthur John Howell
- 1928: (Sir) William Richard Williams (knighted after leaving office)
- 1929: William Charles
- 1930: Robert Gerard Hill-Snook
- 1931: (Sir) Charles William Melhuish (knighted after leaving office)
- 1932: Charles Fletcher Sanders
- 1933: (Sir) Arthur Ernest Gough (knighted after leaving office)
- 1934: John Donovan, former docker and secretary for the South Wales and Monmouthshire Area of the TGWU
- 1935: George Frederick Evans
- 1936: Sir Herbert Hiles (knighted while still in office)
- 1937: Oliver Cuthbert Purnell
- 1938: William Gough Howell
- 1939: Henry Johns
- 1940: Charles Henry McCale
- 1941: James Hellyer
- 1942: James Griffiths
- 1943: Frederick Jones
- 1944: Walter Howell Parker
- 1945: Walter Robert Wills
- 1946: George James Ferguson
- 1947: George James Ferguson
- 1948: Richard Gruffydd Robinson
- 1949: Timothy James Kerrigan
- 1950: George Williams
- 1951: Robert Bevan
- 1952: William Henry James Muston
- 1953: Sir James Patrick Collins (knighted while still in office)
- 1954: George Llewellyn Ferrier
- 1955: Frank Chapman
- 1956: (Sir) Daniel Thomas Williams (knighted after leaving office)
- 1957: John Hinds Morgan
- 1958: Arthur James Williams
- 1959: Helena Evans, Cardiff's first female Lord Mayor
- 1960: Mary Dorothy Lewis
- 1961: Edward Ewart Pearce
- 1962: Clifford Arthur Bence
- 1963: Charles Augustine Horwood
- 1964: William John Hartland
- 1965: Miriam Clarice Bryant
- 1966: Herbert Edward Edmonds
- 1967: Eric Charles Dolman, previously a first class cricketer
- 1968: Sir James Reginald Lyons (knighted while still in office)
- 1969: (Sir) Lincoln Hallinan (knighted after leaving office)
- 1970: Thomas Ernest Merrells
- 1971: Hugh Ferguson-Jones
- 1972: Winifred Rachel Mathias
- 1973: Gerald Alan Smith Turnbull
- 1974: Albert Arthur Huish
- 1975: Sir Charles Hallinan (father of Sir Lincoln Hallinan who had preceded him as Lord Mayor in 1969)
- 1976: John Iorwerth Jones
- 1977: David C. Purnell
- 1978: William Henry Carling
- 1979: Bella Brown
- 1980: John Charles Edwards
- 1981: Ronald Frederick Watkiss
- 1982: Philip Dunleavy (Labour), a retired post office worker
- 1983: Olwen Mary Watkin
- 1984: Albert William 'Bill' Buttle (Labour), a retired engine driver
- 1985: Captain Norman Lloyd-Edwards, also Lord Lieutenant of South Glamorgan 1990 to 2008
- 1986: David Myfyr Evans
- 1987: Julius Hermer
- 1988: William Penry Herbert
- 1989: Mary Elizabeth (Beti) Jones JP, the first Girl Guide Lord Mayor of Cardiff.
- 1990: John Smith (Labour)
- 1991: Jeffrey Sainsbury (Conservative), came to office earlier than expected, after two nominees lost their seats in the May 1991 election.
- 1992: Derek Allinson
- 1993: Victor Riley
- 1994: Ricky Ormonde
- 1995: Timothy Davies
- 1996: John Phillips
- 1997: Max Phillips
- 1998: Marion Drake
- 1999: Russell Goodway (Labour). From 1999 council elections, the Leader of the council was nominated as Lord Mayor for the lifetime of the council.
- 2000: Russell Goodway
- 2001: Russell Goodway
- 2002: Russell Goodway
- 2003: Gordon Houlston (Labour). From 2003 election, reverted to annual appointment of Lord Mayor.
- 2004: Jacqui Gasson, the city's first Liberal Democrat Lord Mayor
- 2005: Freda Salway (Liberal Democrat)
- 2006: Gareth Neale (Conservative)
- 2007: Gill Bird (Labour)
- 2008: Kate Lloyd (Liberal Democrat)
- 2009: Brian Griffiths (Conservative)
- 2010: Keith Hyde (Liberal Democrat)
- 2011: Delme Bowen, the city's first Plaid Cymru Lord Mayor
- 2012: Derrick Morgan, from 27 September 2012 – between May and September 2012 the position of Lord Mayor was unfilled, while the new Labour council attempted to split the responsibilities of the mayor between two councillors. Cllr Cerys Furlong (Labour) filled the traditional mayoral role of Chair of the Council during this period.
- 2013: Derrick Morgan (Labour)
- 2014: Margaret Jones (Liberal Democrat)
- 2015: David Walker (Conservative)
- 2016: Monica Walsh (Labour)
- 2017: Bob Derbyshire (Labour)
- 2018: Dianne Rees (Conservative)
- 2019: Daniel De'Ath (Labour), Cardiff's first black mayor
- 2020–2022: Rod McKerlich (Conservative)
- 2022: Graham Hinchey (Labour)
- 2023: Bablin Molik (Liberal Democrat)
- 2024: Jane Henshaw (Labour); died in office in September
- 2024: Helen Lloyd Jones (Labour)
- 2025: Adrian Robson (Conservative)
- 2026: Michael Michael (Labour)

== See also ==
- Cardiff Council
- Cardiff City Council
- Cardiff County Borough Council
- Mayors in Wales
