= Albert Fuller (politician) =

British Member of Parliament (1894–1969)

Albert George Hubert Fuller (10 December 1894 – 27 July 1969) was a British Member of Parliament.

Fuller served in the British Indian Army for many years, becoming a captain. He retired in 1931, in order to stand for the Conservative Party in Manchester Ardwick, winning the seat.

Fuller lost his seat at the 1935 United Kingdom general election, and found work as commander of the 7th Queen's Own Royal West Kent Regiment, serving until 1939. He then served on Sevenoaks Rural District Council from 1947 until 1956.

Parliament of the United Kingdom
Preceded by Joseph Henderson	Member of Parliament for Manchester Ardwick; 1931–1935	Succeeded by Joseph Henderson
