= Amalgamated Society of Railway Servants =

Former trade union of the United Kingdom

- Merged into: National Union of Railwaymen
- Founded: 1871
- Dissolved: 1913
- Headquarters: 72 Acton Street, London
- Location: United Kingdom
- Members: 97,561 (1907)
- Publication: Railway Review
- Affiliations: TUC, Labour

The Amalgamated Society of Railway Servants (ASRS) was a trade union of railway workers in the United Kingdom from 1871 until 1913.

== History ==
The ASRS was an industrial union founded in 1871 with the support of the Liberal MP Michael Thomas Bass. Its early years were difficult. In 1872 the ASRS reported having 17,247 members but by 1882 this had declined to only 6,321.

In 1880 the ASRS's growth was challenged by the foundation of two railway craft unions: the Associated Society of Locomotive Engineers and Firemen and the United Pointsmen and Signalmen's Society. A fourth union, the General Railway Workers' Union, was founded in 1889.

In 1899, the ASRS introduced a resolution at the Trades Union Congress to form a joint Labour Representation Committee with other trade unionist, socialist, and co-operative groups. This led to the formation of the Labour Party to contest parliamentary elections under the chairmanship of Ramsay MacDonald.

In 1900 the ASRS proposed amalgamation with ASLEF but ASLEF proposed federation with the drivers and firemen of the ASRS. A Scheme of Federation was drafted and ASLEF's triennial conference adopted it in 1903. There were joint meetings of the Executive Committees of the two unions until 1906 when relations broke down.

In 1907 the Board of Trade set up a Conciliation Board between railway employees and their employers, but its operation dissatisfied many workers and ASLEF's General Secretary nicknamed it the "Confiscation" Board. By this point, the ASRS had grown significantly, with 97,561 members in 1907, making it one of the country's largest trade unions.

In August 1911 the ASRS, ASLEF, GRWU and UPSS jointly called the United Kingdom's first national rail strike. In only two days the joint action succeeded in forcing the Liberal Government to set up a Royal Commission to examine the workings of the Conciliation Board.

In 1913 the ASRS, GRWU and UPSS merged, forming the National Union of Railwaymen.

== Election results ==
The ASRS affiliated to the Labour Representation Committee when it was founded, in 1900, and sponsored candidates for the party and its successor, the Labour Party at each subsequent election. Several candidates were elected, including many in Derby, Newcastle-upon-Tyne, and Stockport, who won one of the two seats available in each of those constituencies.

Election	Constituency	Candidate	Votes	% share	Position
1900 general election	Derby	Richard Bell	7,640	25.7	2
1906 general election	Birmingham East	James Holmes	5,343	47.4	2
1906 general election	Newcastle-upon-Tyne	Walter Hudson	18,869	31.1	1
1906 general election	Stockport	George Wardle	7,299	32.4	1
1907 by-election	Kingston upon Hull West	James Holmes	4,512	29.1	3
1910 Jan general election	Derby	James Henry Thomas	10,189	27.9	2
1910 Jan general election	Newcastle-upon-Tyne	Walter Hudson	18,241	28.1	2
1910 Jan general election	Stockport	George James Wardle	6,682	28.0	1
1910 Dec general election	Derby	James Henry Thomas	9,144	34.1	2
1910 Dec general election	Newcastle-upon-Tyne	Walter Hudson	16,447	28.0	2
1910 Dec general election	Stockport	George James Wardle	6,094	26.9	2
1912 by-election	Crewe	James Holmes	2,485	17.7	3

== Leadership ==
=== General Secretaries ===
1871: George Chapman
1874: Fred W. Evans
1883: Edward Harford
1897: Richard Bell
1909: J. E. Williams

=== Assistant Secretaries ===
1883: Thomas Watson
1889: Edward Garrity
1902: J. E. Williams
1910: J. H. Thomas

=== Presidents ===
1872: J. Baxter Langley
1874: John David Jenkins
1877: Peter Stewart Macliver
1892: Walter Hudson
1899: George Thaxton
1902: W. G. Loraine
1905: James Henry Thomas
1907: James Reed Bell
1910: Edward Charles
1911: Albert Bellamy

== Sources and further reading ==
- Bagwell, Philip S (1963). The Railwaymen. London: George Allen & Unwin.
- Bagwell, Philip S (1982). The Railwaymen – Volume 2: the Beeching Era and After. London: George Allen & Unwin. ISBN 0-04-331084-2.
- Gold, Michael. "History through Literary Imagination: Portrayals of Worker Representation and Collective Action in Condition-of-England Novels, c.1830–1855" Historical Studies in Industrial Relations, Vol. 46: 1-51. online
- Griffiths, Robert (2005). Driven by Ideals. London: Associated Society of Locomotive Engineers and Firemen.
- McKillop, Norman (1950). The Lighted Flame; a History of the Associated Society of Locomotive Engineers and Firemen. London & Edinburgh: Thomas Nelson & Sons Ltd.
- John R. Raynes (1921), Engines and Men, Goodall & Suddick, Wikidata Q115680227

== See also ==
- Help (dog)
