= Teddy Hall =

Teddy Hall may refer to:

- The nickname of St Edmund Hall, Oxford, one of the constituent colleges of the University of Oxford
- Edwin Hall (trade unionist) (1895–1961), British trade unionist
- Edward Thomas Hall (1924–2001), British scientist and balloonist, who exposed the Piltdown Man fraud

== See also ==
- Ted Hall (disambiguation)
- Edward Hall (disambiguation)
