= Thomas Halliday (trade unionist) =

British trade unionist

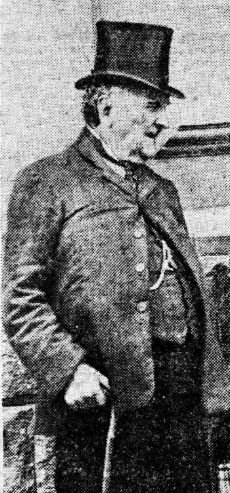
Halliday in 1909

Thomas Halliday (18 July 1835 – 24 November 1919) was a British trade unionist.

Born in Prestolee near Bolton, Lancashire, Halliday's father was killed in a mining accident when Tom was only two years old. Six years later, Halliday went to work at the same pit. After being badly injured falling partway down a shaft, he worked in a textile warehouse for a time, before returning to the mines, where he worked alongside his new stepfather.

Halliday continued to work as a miner into his twenties, spending time in County Durham, Staffordshire and Yorkshire. He became interested in trade unionism, and in 1862 founded the Wigan Miners' Provident Benefit Society, followed in 1863 by the Farnworth and Kearsley District Miners' Union. This second union employed Halliday as its full-time agent, and through this role, Halliday became active in Alexander Macdonald's Miners' National Association (MNA).

Halliday and William Pickard became critical of Macdonald's cautious approach to trade unionism, and founded a new Amalgamated Association of Miners (AAM), with Halliday as President. This new association advocated more militant action, including solidarity strikes, but continued to co-operate with the MNA, and even welcomed Macdonald to speak at its conferences. The AAM was initially successful, expanding across Great Britain and winning several strikes, proving particularly prominent in South Wales. This inspired Halliday to stand as a Liberal-Labour candidate in Merthyr Tydfil at the 1874 UK general election, taking 25% of the vote, but only third place.

Following a downturn in the industry, the AAM went bankrupt in 1875 and was absorbed by the MNA (by then, renamed as the "Miners' National Union"). Halliday was elected as the secretary of the MNU, but in 1877 stood down to try to re-establish the AAM, working with William Abraham. Although he spent the next three years attempting to resurrect it, he was unsuccessful. He moved to South Wales, where he sold supplies to small collieries.

Trade union offices
New post	President of the Amalgamated Association of Miners; 1870 – 1875	Union dissolved
Preceded by Philip Casey	Secretary of the Miners' National Union; 1875 – 1877	Succeeded by William Crawford
