= James Hammond =

James Hammond may refer to:

- James Hammond (author) (1710–1742), English poet and politician
- James B. Hammond (1839–1913), American inventor
- James Henry Hammond (1807–1864), politician, Democrat from South Carolina
- James Hammond Trumbull (1821–1897), scholar and philologist
- Jim Hammond (Idaho politician) (born 1950), politician, Republican Idaho state senator
- James T. Hammond (1856–1942), politician, Secretary of State of Utah
- Jim Hammond (footballer) (1907–1985), footballer
- Jim Hammond (trade unionist), British trade union leader and communist activist
- Jim Hammond aka Human Torch (android)
