= Edward Hall (disambiguation) =

Edward Hall (1498–1547) was an English chronicler and lawyer.

Edward, Ed, Edd, or Eddie Hall may also refer to:

== Arts and entertainment ==
- Edd Hall (born 1958), American television announcer
- Edward Hall (director) (born 1966), English theatre director
- Ed Hall (television presenter) (born 1972), British television presenter

== Law and politics ==
- J. Edward Hall (1851–1889), American politician and trade union organizer
- Edward Hall (New York politician) (1852–1914), American politician
- Sir Edward Marshall Hall (1858–1927), English barrister

== Sports ==
- Edward K. Hall (1870–1932), American football coach
- Edward L. Hall (1872–1932), American tennis player
- Eddie Hall (racing driver) (1900–1982), British racing driver and bobsledder
- Eddie Hall (born 1988), English strongman competitor

== Others ==
- Edward Smith Hall (1786–1860), English-born newspaper editor in Australia
- Edward N. Hall (1914–2006), American rocket scientist
- Edward T. Hall (1914–2009), American anthropologist
- Edward Thomas Hall (1924–2001), English scientist
- Edward J. Hall (born 1966), American philosopher

== Other uses ==
- Ed Hall (band), American alternative rock band
- Ed Hall (One Life to Live), fictional soap opera character

== See also ==
- Edmond Hall (1901–1967), American musician
- Edwards Hall, a multipurpose arena in Miami, Florida, U.S.A.
- Edwin Hall (disambiguation)
- Ted Hall (disambiguation)
- Teddy Hall (disambiguation)
