= Select Committee of the House of Lords on the Women's Royal Air Force =

The Select Committee of the House of Lords on the Women's Royal Air Force was a Select Committee of the House of Lords created to investigate a complaint by Violet Douglas-Pennant that she had been fired in an attempt by several senior Women's Royal Air Force (WRAF) officers to cover up "rife immorality" within the WRAF. After her request for a judicial enquiry was turned down Lord Stanhope proposed a government enquiry in the House of Lords, saying that the government had turned down Douglas-Pennant's request for a judicial enquiry because "His Majesty's Government fear the scandals which will come to light when this inquiry is held", and that her dismissal was contrary to the law.

His proposal was accepted, and the committee first sat on 14 October 1918. After three weeks of calling witnesses the committee began to write its report, which was published in December 1919. The final report concluded that Douglas-Pennant had failed to provide any evidence that there was a conspiracy to allow practices of "rife immorality" to continue, nor that this "immorality" had ever existed in the first place.

== Background ==
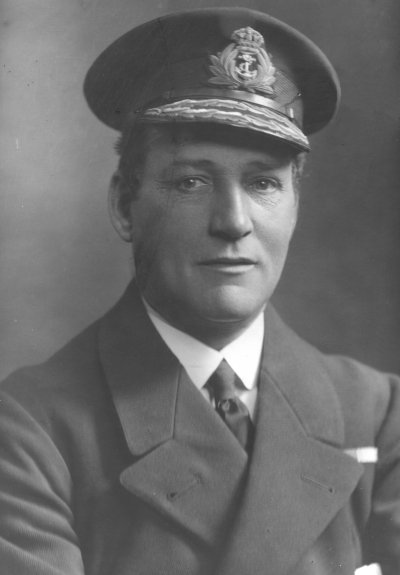
Godfrey Paine, Violet Douglas-Pennant's immediate superior.

Violet Douglas-Pennant was a philanthropist who had previously done work for Queen Mary's Army Auxiliary Corps and the Women's Royal Naval Service; as such she was a natural choice for Commandant of the WRAF when it was formed in 1918. She agreed to spend a month "looking round" the WRAF, and her experiences during that month led her to decline the appointment. She found that although she was responsible for 14,000 WRAF members in 500 camps there were only 70 officers, and the existing training facilities were only managing to train 25 new officers every three weeks. There were also problems with shortages of various pieces of equipment, including uniforms and medical tools, and many of the WRAF members were living in poor quality accommodation.

There were also various small personal problems, which irritated and frustrated her. Her office was a small, dark room on the top floor of the Hotel Cecil next to a men's lavatory, and there was so little furniture that she was forced to keep her papers and files on the floor. In addition she was not given an Air Ministry pass, meaning that every time she entered the building she was forced to fill in a form before being escorted to her office "presumably to call on myself". As a result of these difficulties she officially declined the appointment in a letter to Godfrey Paine on 11 June 1918, saying that "I am very sorry to be obliged to decline the appointment of Commandant", Despite this she was convinced to stay on, and her appointment was confirmed on 18 June.

The situation did not improve, however; there were still problems with training and equipment, five of her secretaries resigned, and her deputies all left at once. Despite these problems she attempted to improve the WRAF, recruiting friends to help with the paperwork and using her contacts from her time in local government (for example, her service on the London County Council Education Committee) to "borrow" Eltham Teacher Training College during the summer holiday, where she trained 450 new officers. In protest at the irregularities and problems she tried to resign twice; both of these resignations were blocked by Godfrey Paine, who assured her that she had his full support. The Air Ministry were getting frustrated with the WRAF, however, and Weir wrote to Paine's replacement, Sefton Brancker, asking him to remove Douglas-Pennant. She was dismissed without prior warning on 28 August 1918, and never again held government office.

Douglas-Pennant claimed she had been dismissed in an attempt by several senior officers, including Colonel Bersey, the commander of the WRAF supplies unit, General Livingston, the deputy head of the personnel department and Mrs Beatty, the Assistant Commandant of the WRAF, to cover up "rife immorality" in WRAF camps by getting rid of the only officer "too straight for them to work with". She claimed that this immorality had been occurring particularly at a motor training camp called Hurst Park, where the camp commander Colonel S. Janson had been discovered sleeping with one of the WRAF officers. Following her dismissal Douglas-Pennant wrote to several important politicians including Winston Churchill asking for a judicial enquiry, and when this request was turned down Lord Stanhope proposed a government enquiry in the House of Lords, saying that the government had turned down Douglas-Pennant's request for a judicial enquiry because "His Majesty's Government fear the scandals which will come to light when this inquiry is held", and that her dismissal was contrary to the law.

== Select Committee ==
Stanhope's proposal passed, and the five-member Select Committee of the House of Lords on the Women's Royal Air Force was formed. The committee was led by Lord Wrenbury, with the other four members being the Earl of Kintore, the Earl of Denbigh, Lord Methuen and Lord Farrer. The committee began its work on 14 October 1918, and sat for three weeks. Douglas-Pennant was represented by Anthony Hawke KC and Stewart Bevan KC, while the Air Ministry was represented by the Attorney General, Lord Hewart, and Rigby Swift KC. Colonel Bersey was represented by Patrick Hastings KC and Colonel Janson by Henry Curtis-Bennett KC.

Patrick Hastings, who had only recently been made a KC, took the lead in cross-examining Violet Douglas-Pennant. Douglas-Pennant accused Colonel Bersey and others of promoting this "rife immorality" and not having the best interests of the WRAF at heart. When cross examined, however, she was unable to provide any evidence of this "rife immorality" or any kind of a conspiracy, saying that she could not find any specific instance of "immorality" at the camps she visited and that it was "always rumour". After three weeks the committee dismissed all witnesses. The final report was produced in December 1919, and found that Douglas-Pennant had been completely unable to substantiate her claims and was deserving "of the gravest censure". As a result, Douglas-Pennant was never again employed by the government.

== Bibliography ==
- Hyde, H Montgomery (1960). Sir Patrick Hastings, his life and cases. London: Heinemann. OCLC 498180.
- Mitchell, d (1965). Women on the Warpath: the story of the women of the First World War. London: Jonathan Cape.
