= Violet Douglas-Pennant =

British philanthropist

- Born: 31 January 1869; Belgrave Square, London
- Died: 12 October 1945 (aged 76)
- Relatives: George Douglas-Pennant, 2nd Baron Penrhyn
- Military career
- Allegiance: United Kingdom
- Branch: Women's Royal Air Force
- Service years: 1918
- Rank: Commandant
- Commands: Women's Royal Air Force

Commandant Hon. Violet Blanche Douglas-Pennant (31 January 1869 – 12 October 1945) was a British philanthropist and supporter of local government who served as the second commandant of the Women's Royal Air Force (WRAF) until her dismissal in August 1918.

Born into the aristocracy, Douglas-Pennant became interested in youth clubs for girls which led her to charity work with the unemployed and with disabled children. Working with the Workers' Educational Association led her to become involved in the establishment and reform of local government, and she eventually became a member of the London County Council Education Committee.

After the establishment of the WRAF in 1918 she was suggested as a potential Commandant due to her experience in reform and management. She agreed to spend a month "looking round" the camp, and was so unhappy that she repeatedly tried to resign. Following her dismissal on 28 August 1918 by Lord Weir she wrote to several important political figures such as Winston Churchill asking for a judicial inquiry into her dismissal, claiming that it was part of an attempt by other senior WRAF officers to "cover up rife immorality" at WRAF bases. Lord Stanhope proposed establishing the Select Committee of the House of Lords on the Women's Royal Air Force to investigate any immorality. His proposal passed, and the committee began its work on 14 October 1918.

The Committee found that there was no evidence to back up Douglas-Pennant's accusations, and she was later sued for libel by two of the senior WRAF officers for comments she had made before and during the Select Committee's hearings. Douglas-Pennant was never again employed by the government, and spent the following decades attempting to clear her name before her death on 12 October 1945.

== Early life and work ==
Violet Douglas-Pennant was the sixth child of George Douglas-Pennant, 2nd Baron Penrhyn, and his first wife Penella Blanche, who died five days after Violet's birth. After a normal upbringing she became involved in philanthropic work with girls youth clubs, which led her into working with the poor, unemployed, uneducated and disabled in London. As a result of her work with the uneducated and unemployed she served on the board of governors for various schools, and eventually became a member of the Borough of Finsbury unemployment committee. Her involvement with the Workers' Educational Association led her to work on other local government committees and eventually the London County Council Education Committee.

She also served as a governor of the University College of South Wales and a member of the Conservative and Unionist Women's Franchise Association (although she was not a suffragette herself). In 1911 she was made National Health Insurance Commissioner for South Wales, and became a Lady-in-Waiting to Princess Louise, Duchess of Argyll. As National Insurance Commissioner she was paid £1000 a year; a massive amount for a woman, and the highest salary of any woman in Britain at the time. In 1914 she helped fund a 500-bed hospital in Belgium, and as a Lady-in-Waiting accompanied Louise on visits to Red Cross facilities during the First World War. She helped organise the Scottish Women's Hospital Unit, although she was not one of the 81 women sent to Russia to assist Serbian soldiers.

== WRAF ==
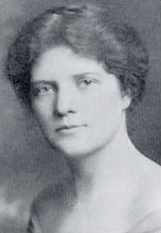
Lady Margaret Rhondda, who wrote a report on the WRAF that led to Violet Douglas-Pennant's dismissal.

Douglas-Pennant had previously done work for Queen Mary's Army Auxiliary Corps and the Women's Royal Naval Service; as such she was a natural choice for Commandant of the Women's Royal Air Force when it was formed in 1918. She agreed to spend a month "looking round" the WRAF, and her experiences during that month led her to decline the appointment. She found that although she was responsible for 14,000 WRAF members in 500 camps there were only 70 officers, and the existing training facilities were only managing to train 25 new officers every three weeks. There were also problems with shortages of various pieces of equipment, including uniforms and medical tools, and many of the WRAF members were living in poor quality accommodation.

There were also various small personal problems, which irritated and frustrated her. Her office was a small, dark room on the top floor of the Hotel Cecil next to a men's lavatory, and there was so little furniture that she was forced to keep her papers and files on the floor. In addition she was not given an Air Ministry pass, meaning that every time she entered the building she was forced to fill in a form before being escorted to her office "presumably to call on myself". As a result of these difficulties, she officially declined the appointment in a letter to Godfrey Paine on 11 June 1918, saying that "I am very sorry to be obliged to decline the appointment of Commandant", Despite this she was convinced to stay on, and her appointment was confirmed on 18 June.

The situation did not improve, however; there were still problems with training and equipment, five of her secretaries resigned, and her deputies all left at once. Despite these problems she attempted to improve the WRAF, recruiting friends to help with the paperwork and using her contacts from her time in local government to "borrow" Eltham Teacher Training College during the summer holiday, where she trained 450 new officers. In protest at the irregularities and problems she tried to resign twice; both of these resignations were blocked by Godfrey Paine, who assured her that she had his full support.

By this point the Air Ministry were getting frustrated with the WRAF, and Sir William Weir commissioned Lady Margaret Rhondda to write a full report on the state of the WRAF. The report was highly critical of Douglas-Pennant's performance as Commandant, and Weir ordered Paine's replacement, Sefton Brancker, to remove Douglas-Pennant. She was dismissed without prior warning on 28 August 1918 and replaced by Helen Gwynne-Vaughan. Her dismissal was looked upon unfavourably by politicians and trade unionists, and Lord Ampthill, Jimmy Thomas and Mary Reid Macarthur wrote a letter to The Daily Telegraph complaining about Weir's conduct.

== Select Committee ==
Douglas-Pennant claimed she had been dismissed in an attempt by several senior officers, including Colonel Bersey, the commander of the WRAF supplies unit, General Livingston, the deputy head of the personnel department, and Mrs Beatty, the Assistant Commandant of the WRAF, to cover up "rife immorality" in WRAF camps by getting rid of the only officer "too straight for them to work with". She claimed that this immorality had been occurring particularly at a motor training camp called Hurst Park, where the camp commander Colonel Sam Janson had been discovered sleeping with one of the WRAF officers. Following her dismissal, Douglas-Pennant wrote to several important politicians including Winston Churchill asking for a judicial enquiry, and when this request was turned down, Lord Stanhope proposed a government enquiry in the House of Lords, saying that the government had turned down Douglas-Pennant's request for a judicial enquiry because "His Majesty's Government fear the scandals which will come to light when this inquiry is held", and that her dismissal was contrary to the law.

Stanhope's proposal passed, and the five-member Select Committee of the House of Lords on the Women's Royal Air Force was formed. The committee was led by Lord Wrenbury, with the other four members being the Earl of Kintore, the Earl of Denbigh, Lord Methuen and Lord Farrer.

The committee began its work on 14 October 1918, and sat for three weeks. Douglas-Pennant was represented by Anthony Hawke KC and Stewart Bevan KC, while the Air Ministry was represented by the Attorney General, Lord Hewart, and Rigby Swift KC. Colonel Bersey was represented by Patrick Hastings KC and Colonel Janson by Henry Curtis-Bennett KC.

Douglas-Pennant was unable to produce any evidence of the "rife immorality" that she had accused several officers of, and after three weeks the committee dismissed all witnesses. The final report was produced in December 1919, and found that Douglas-Pennant had been completely unable to substantiate her claims and was deserving "of the gravest censure".

== Later life ==
As a result of the Select Committee's findings Douglas-Pennant was never again employed by the government, and spent the rest of her life attempting to clear her name. The committee's decision led two of the parties (Colonels Janson and Bersey) to sue her for libel, and both cases were successful, forcing her to pay "substantial" damages. She died on 12 October 1945.

== Bibliography ==
- Hyde, H. Montgomery (1960). Sir Patrick Hastings, his life and cases. London: Heinemann. OCLC 498180.
- Ockham, David (1922). The English Dreyfus case. David Ockham. OCLC 15287738.
- Mitchell, D (1965). Women on the Warpath: the story of the women of the First World War. London: Jonathan Cape.
- Bourne, J. M. (2001). Who's who in World War One. Routledge. ISBN 0-415-14179-6.

Military offices
Preceded by Gertrude Crawford	Commandant of the Women's Royal Air Force; May–September 1918	Succeeded by Helen Gwynne-Vaughan
