= Tyldesley Miners' Association =

Coal miners' association in Lancashire, England

The Tyldesley Miners' Association represented coal miners in parts of Lancashire, in England.

The union was established in 1874, as a split from the Wigan Miners' Association. It was led by Robert Isherwood.

In the 1887, the union established lodges at each pit in its area. Around this time, it affiliated to the Lancashire and Cheshire Miners' Federation (LCMF). In 1893, it renamed itself as the Tyldesley and Astley Miners' Association, at which point, it had 3,351 members. This remained stable for many years. It became an integral part of the LCMF, and later, of the National Union of Mineworkers. It was dissolved in 1971.
