= Rolle College =

Coordinates: 50°36′56″N 3°24′21″W

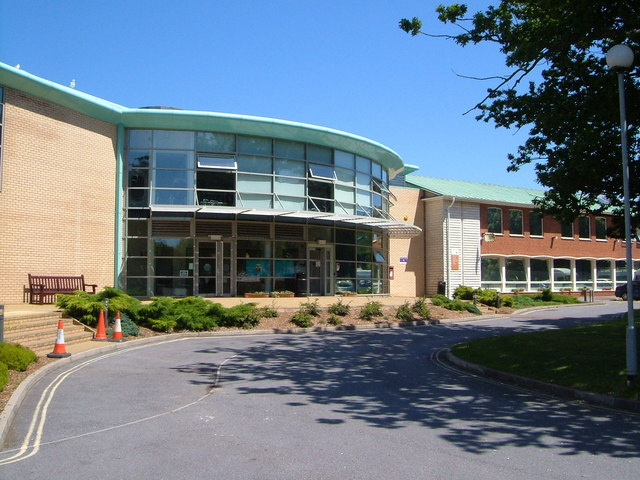
The former Exmouth Campus of the University of Plymouth

Rolle College was a teacher training college in Exmouth, Devon, England, which formed the Exmouth campus of the University of Plymouth until its closure in 2009. The university moved its taught courses from the site to new facilities at its main Plymouth campus.

== History ==
In 1902 Southlands School moved to Fairfield, which was a large house on Douglas Avenue, and expanded to occupy Brockhurst House and Eldin House. Famous alumni include Elisabeth Frink, Elinor Jenkins, and Edith Helen Pratt. The school closed in 1942 and the buildings were taken over for war work.

The college opened in 1946, and initially graduates were awarded a Certificate in Education by the University of Exeter. In 1988, Rolle College became part of Polytechnic South West, and in 1990 was absorbed into the University of Plymouth.

The Exmouth campus was closed in 2008, when University of Plymouth relocated the college, its 3000 students and 400 staff to their main campus in Plymouth.

Rolle played a significant part in the life of Exmouth, both economically and socially. The decision to relocate the campus was controversial with past and present students, staff and the local community. Anti-closure demonstrations and campaigns lasted until the relocation.

With the premises becoming vacant, and with Exmouth no longer being home to a community of students, a Community Benefit Company (Rolle Exmouth Limited, or REL) was set up in 2010 to find new uses for the site that would benefit the community. Plans were drawn up in conjunction with University of Plymouth to retain part of the site for a mixture of uses including educational and vocational training, business incubation, and community facilities; the plans included disposal of a significant part of the site for housing development. Negotiations appeared to be proceeding well (though slowly), when University of Plymouth suddenly announced, on 1 September 2016, that contracts had been exchanged with the Exeter Royal Academy for Deaf Education, under which the academy would acquire the entire site and relocate there from its existing premises in Exeter. The Deaf Academy's Chief Executive, Jonathan Farnhill, described his vision that the new site would "transform the lives of Deaf children and their families and ... be a place where Deaf and hearing people can come together
