= 1915 St Helens by-election =

UK Parliamentary by-election

The 1915 St Helens by-election was held on 24 November 1915. The by-election was held due to the incumbent Conservative MP, Rigby Swift, becoming Recorder of Wigan. It was retained by Rigby Swift who was unopposed due to a War-time electoral pact, one of twenty-six unopposed by-elections that year.
