= Lancashire and Cheshire Miners' Federation =

L.C.M.F.
- Lancashire and Cheshire Miners' Federation
- Merged into: National Union of Mineworkers
- Founded: 1881
- Dissolved: 1945
- Headquarters: Bridgeman Place, Bolton, Lancashire
- Location: England
- Members: 70,000 (1907)
- Affiliations: Miners' Federation of Great Britain

The Lancashire and Cheshire Miners' Federation (LCMF) was a trade union that operated on the Lancashire Coalfield in North West England from 1881 until it became the Lancashire area of the National Union of Mineworkers in 1945.

== Background ==
Colliery owners fended off unions until well into the 19th century and trade unionism was slow to take a hold on the Lancashire Coalfield. Wages were poor and employers arbitrarily fined men for minor reasons, disallowed wages on false pretexts and victimised perceived radicals. Bonds, a system of hiring that legally tied miners to their job for a year, were used to enforce discipline. Miners protested about poor wages in 1757 when bread prices rose and some marched from Kersal towards Manchester in protest, but were turned back. When trouble flared, the Home Secretary ordered troops to be ready to quell unrest. Long strikes were unsustainable as the miners had no organisation or finances to back them. The first miners' association was the Brotherly Union Society formed in Pemberton, Wigan in 1794. It was described as a friendly society to avoid prosecution under the Combination Acts and in the early-19th century there were 21 such societies in central Lancashire.

Strikes in the first quarter of the 19th century generally failed to improve pay and conditions. In 1830 miners formed the Friendly Society of Coal Mining with headquarters in Bolton. The organisation was based on local branches with delegates attending quarterly meetings. The coal owners were not sympathetic and when the men went on strike to assert their right to organise, William Hulton issued a pamphlet condemning his workforce who he considered had: "wantonly injured me to the fll limits of your ability, in my purse, and you have much farther wounded my feelings".

The Miners' Association of Great Britain and Ireland was established at a meeting in Wakefield in 1842 and lasted for seven years. It supported the commission headed by Lord Anthony Ashley-Cooper, 7th Earl of Shaftesbury and the passing of the Coal Mines Act 1842 which prohibited all females and boys under ten from working underground. The association had 100,000 members and was involved in lobbying parliament to prevent persecution by tyrannical employers. The association, initially strongest in Yorkshire and the North-East, held a public meeting at Kersal in 1843 that was attended by 150 miners. Its general-secretary, David Swallow, considered the Lancashire miners to be among the worst paid in the country and attempted to address miners in Westhoughton, but the mineowners, including William Hulton, prevented him from holding a meeting. Lord Francis Egerton employed 1,300 workers, paying them little more than if they were in the workhouse. Opposition from the coal owners did not prevent the association recruiting members and 98 lodges were formed in Lancashire and Cheshire by October 1843. Lancashire miners were poorly paid compared with other coalfields and antagonisms arose between the workers and the union.

== Federation ==
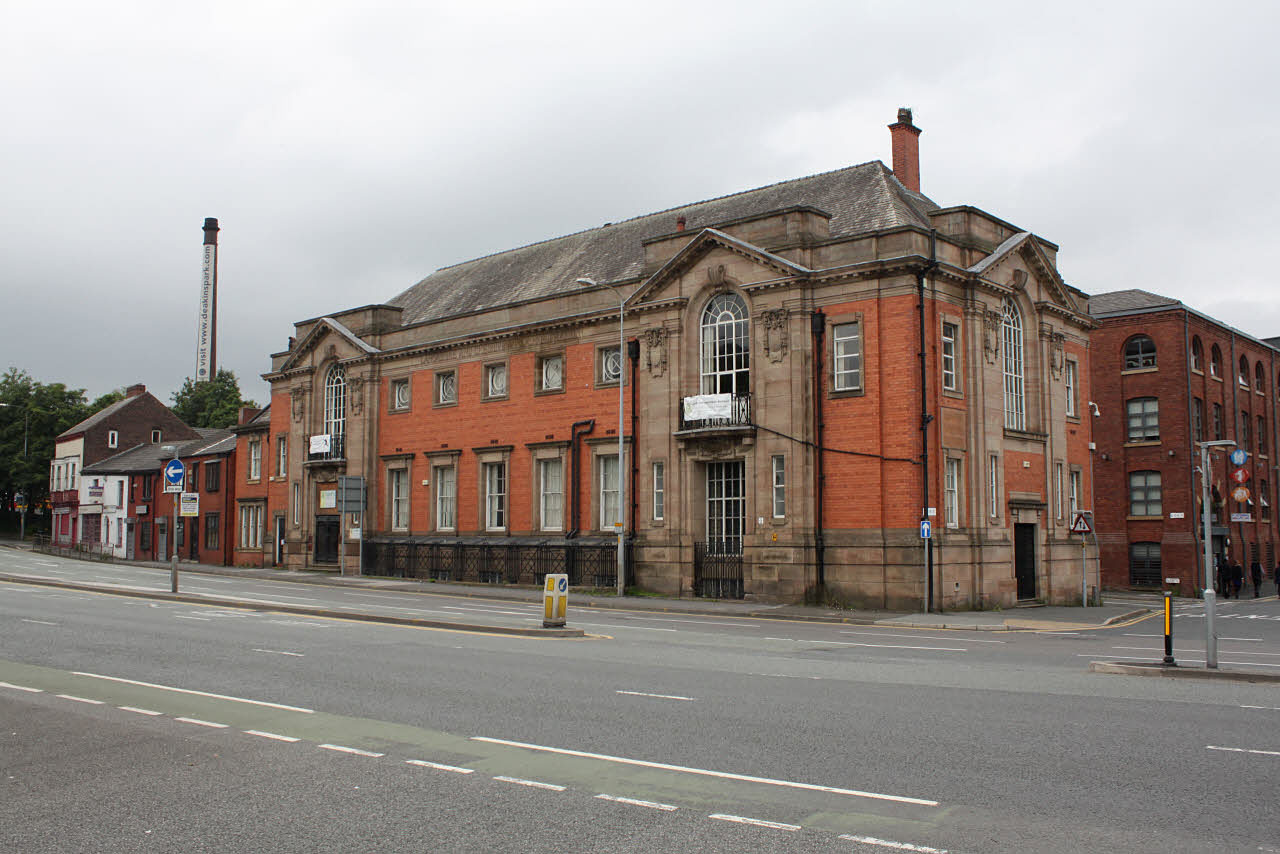
The Lancashire and Cheshire Miners Federation headquarters in Bolton

The Lancashire and Cheshire Miners' Federation was founded in 1881 in the aftermath of a bitter seven-week strike that was frequently violent. Thomas Ashton, secretary of the Ashton-under-Lyne area, organised a meeting at the old Manchester Town Hall that led to the merger of several district unions on the Lancashire Coalfield. Not all the district unions joined and a further meeting was arranged in Wigan later in the year. The federation was plagued with rivalries, between different areas and the personalities that emerged in its leadership. In the aftermath of the strike, funds were exhausted and its organisation chaotic. Sam Woods was elected the miners' agent and needed to unite the districts so that the fledgling union did not disintegrate. Robert Isherwood, secretary and agent for the Tyldesley Miners' Association, was its first treasurer.

Member union	Founded	Affiliated	Membership (1893)
Ashton, Haydock and Bolton Miners' Trade Union	1882	1882	12,460
Ashton-under-Lyne Miners' Association	1865	1881	3,909
Aspull and District Miners' Association	1890	1897	664
Bank Hall Miners' Association	1899		409 (1911)
Blackrod Miners' Association	1881	1897	380
Hindley Miners' Improvement Benefit Society	1878	1881	1,392
Leigh and District Miners' Association	1878		5,842
Little Lever, Darcy Lever, Breightmet and Great Lever Miners' Association	1887		1,600
Manchester Miners' Association	1886		3,897
Norden and District Miners' Association	1890		96
North Stafford Miners' Association	1869	1883	7,026
Oldham and District Miners' Association	1894		151 (1894)
Pemberton and District Miners' Association	1881		1,100
Pride of Bamfurlong Miners' Provident Society	1878		400
Radcliffe, Bury and Kearsley Miners' Association	1879	1881	3,138
St Helens Colliery District Federation of Miners	1880	1881	1,454
Skelmersdale District Miners' Association	1873	1881	1,693
Smallbridge and Littleborough Miners' Association	1891		40
Standish and District Miners' Association	1862	1897	1,007
Tyldesley Miners' Association	1874	1887	3,351 (1907)
Westhoughton Miners' Association	1877		
Wigan Miners' Association	1862	1881	5,382
Worsley Miners' Association	1863	1881	

In 1888, the union called a national conference, which led to the formation of the Miners Federation of Great Britain (MFGB) the following year. Of the fifty delegates at the Newport meeting at which the MFGB was formed, 19 of the 50 delegates were from Lancashire. In 1897, some small affiliates merged into the central organisation, which began representing their former members directly.

Sam Woods, was elected as a Lib-Lab MP in the 1892 general election. In 1903, the union affiliated to the Labour Representation Committee, by far the most important miners' union to join at that time. Stephen Walsh was appointed agent of the LCMF in 1901 and, sponsored by the federation, fought for and won the Ince seat at the 1906 General Election.

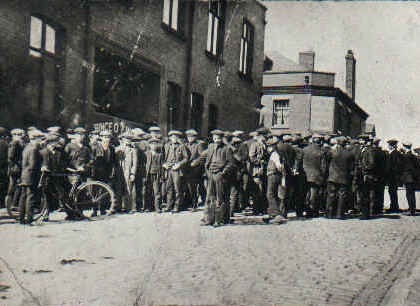
Miners outside Tyldesley Miners Hall during the 1926 general strike

Membership rose rapidly, reaching over 70,000 by 1907. In 1913 Thomas Greenall, President and Thomas Ashton, Secretary, laid foundation stones in Bridgeman Place, Bolton for stone and brick headquarters designed by Bolton architects Bradshaw, Gass & Hope. Pit brow women were admitted as members of the Federation after the first World War although work at collieries was considered an unsuitable job for women.

The Lancashire miners were not considered as militant as their counterparts on other coalfields but were involved in disputes both locally and nationally.

== Post nationalisation ==
Badge of the North West Area NUM

After the formation of the National Union of Mineworkers in 1945, the LCMF became its Lancashire area. In 1963, this absorbed the Cumberland Area and was renamed the North West Area.

== Officers ==
Presidents

1881: Thomas Aspinwall
c.1890: Sam Woods
1906: Thomas Greenall
1929: John McGurk
1944: Edwin Hall
1945: Laurence Plover
1946: Jim Hammond
1949: Charles Tyrer
1952: Jim Hammond
1953: J. Unsworth
1956: Sam Foster
1958: Leo Crossley
1962: Jim Hammond
1967: Leo Crossley
1968: Sid Vincent
1971: E. Dooley
1970s: Bernard Donaghy
1980s: Frank King
1989: Steven Sullivan
1990s: Paul Hardman

General Secretaries

1881: Thomas Ashton
1919: Post vacant
1927: Peter Pemberton
1945: Edwin Hall
1960: Joe Gormley
1971: Sid Vincent
1986: Roy Jackson
1990s: Billy Kelly

Treasurers

1881: Robert Isherwood
1905: Thomas Glover
1913: Harry Roughley
1931:
