= St Helens (constituency) =

Parliamentary constituency in the United Kingdom, 1885–1983

- Former county constituency for the House of Commons
- St Helens in Lancashire, showing boundaries used from 1974–1983
- County: Lancashire
- Major settlements: St Helens

1885–1983
- Seats: One
- Created from: South West Lancashire
- Replaced by: St Helens North and St Helens South

St Helens was a constituency in the county of Lancashire, England. It returned one Member of Parliament (MP) to the House of Commons of the UK Parliament.

Created by the Redistribution of Seats Act 1885, the constituency was abolished in 1983, being split into St Helens North and St Helens South seats.

== Boundaries ==
1885–1918: The Municipal Borough of St Helens.

1918–1983: The County Borough of St Helens.

== Members of Parliament ==
Election	Member	Party	Notes
1885	Henry Seton-Karr	Conservative	
1906	Thomas Glover	Labour	
1910	Rigby Swift	Conservative	
1918	James Sexton	Labour	
1931	Richard Austin Spencer	Conservative	
1935	William Albert Robinson	Labour	
1945	Hartley Shawcross	Labour	Resigned May 1958
1958 by-election	Leslie Spriggs	Labour	
1983	constituency abolished		

== Elections ==
=== Elections in the 1880s ===
Seton-Karr

General election 1885: St Helens
Party	Candidate	Votes	%	±%
Conservative	Henry Seton-Karr	3,750	50.4	
Liberal	David Gamble	3,693	49.6	
Majority		57	0.8	
Turnout		7,443	89.8	
Registered electors		8,291		
Conservative win (new seat)				

General election 1886: St Helens
Party	Candidate	Votes	%	±%
Conservative	Henry Seton-Karr	3,621	51.5	+1.1
Liberal	Arthur Sinclair	3,404	48.5	−1.1
Majority		217	3.0	+2.2
Turnout		7,025	84.7	−5.1
Registered electors		8,291		
Conservative hold		Swing	+1.1	

=== Elections in the 1890s ===
General election 1892: St Helens
Party	Candidate	Votes	%	±%
Conservative	Henry Seton-Karr	4,258	50.3	−1.2
Liberal	William Rann Kennedy	4,199	49.7	+1.2
Majority		59	0.6	−2.4
Turnout		8,457	90.3	+5.6
Registered electors		9,370		
Conservative hold		Swing	−1.2	

General election 1895: St Helens
Party	Candidate	Votes	%	±%
Conservative	Henry Seton-Karr	4,700	53.5	+3.2
Liberal	John Forster	4,091	46.5	−3.2
Majority		609	7.0	+6.4
Turnout		8,791	88.4	−1.9
Registered electors		9,950		
Conservative hold		Swing	+3.2	

=== Elections in the 1900s ===
General election 1900: St Helens
Party	Candidate	Votes	%	±%
Conservative	Henry Seton-Karr	5,300	60.9	+7.4
Liberal	Charles Conybeare	3,402	39.1	−7.4
Majority		1,898	21.8	+14.8
Turnout		8,702	80.9	−7.5
Registered electors		10,763		
Conservative hold		Swing	+7.4	

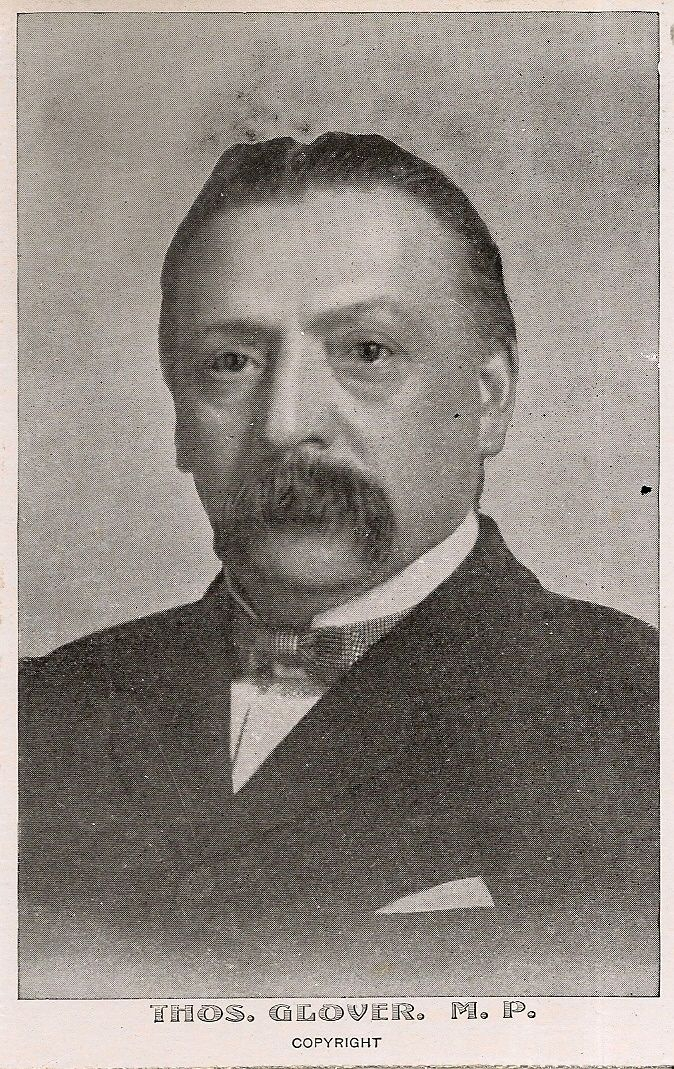
Glover

General election 1906: St Helens
Party	Candidate	Votes	%	±%
Labour Repr. Cmte.	Thomas Glover	6,058	56.6	New
Conservative	Henry Seton-Karr	4,647	43.4	−17.5
Majority		1,411	13.2	N/A
Turnout		10,705	87.9	+7.0
Registered electors		12,174		
Labour Repr. Cmte. gain from Conservative		Swing		

=== Elections in the 1910s ===
General election January 1910: St Helens
Party	Candidate	Votes	%	±%
Labour	Thomas Glover	6,512	53.3	−3.3
Conservative	Rigby Swift	5,717	46.7	+3.3
Majority		795	6.6	−6.6
Turnout		12,229	93.6	+5.7
Registered electors		13,068		
Labour hold		Swing	−3.3	

General election December 1910: St Helens
Party	Candidate	Votes	%	±%
Conservative	Rigby Swift	6,016	51.1	+4.4
Labour	Thomas Glover	5,752	48.9	−4.4
Majority		264	2.2	N/A
Turnout		11,768	90.1	−3.5
Registered electors		13,068		
Conservative gain from Labour		Swing	+4.4	

General Election 1914–15: Another General Election was required to take place before the end of 1915. The political parties had been making preparations for an election to take place and by July 1914, the following candidates had been selected;

- Unionist: Rigby Swift
- Labour: James Sexton

1915 St Helens by-election
Party	Candidate	Votes	%	±%
Unionist	Rigby Swift	Unopposed		
Unionist hold				

General election 1918: St Helens
Party		Candidate	Votes	%	±%
	Labour	James Sexton	15,583	57.1	+8.2
C	Unionist	Rigby Swift	11,689	42.9	−8.2
Majority			3,894	14.2	N/A
Turnout			27,272	61.5	−28.6
	Labour gain from Unionist		Swing	+8.2	
C indicates candidate endorsed by the coalition government.

=== Elections in the 1920s ===
General election 1922: St Helens
Party	Candidate	Votes	%	±%
Labour	James Sexton	20,731	58.7	+1.6
Unionist	Edward Wooll	14,587	41.3	−1.6
Majority		6,144	17.4	+3.2
Turnout		35,318	80.0	+18.5
Labour hold		Swing	+1.6	

General election 1923: St Helens
Party	Candidate	Votes	%	±%
Labour	James Sexton	20,086	55.5	−3.2
Unionist	Margaret Evelyn Pilkington	16,109	44.5	+3.2
Majority		3,977	11.0	−6.4
Turnout		36,195	80.5	+0.5
Labour hold		Swing	−3.2	

General election 1924: St Helens
Party	Candidate	Votes	%	±%
Labour	James Sexton	21,313	55.8	+0.3
Unionist	Margaret Evelyn Pilkington	16,908	44.2	−0.3
Majority		4,405	11.6	+0.6
Turnout		38,221	83.1	+2.6
Labour hold		Swing		

General election 1929: St Helens
Party	Candidate	Votes	%	±%
Labour	James Sexton	27,665	58.6	+2.8
Unionist	Richard Austin Spencer	19,560	41.4	−2.8
Majority		8,105	17.2	+5.6
Turnout		47,225	78.3	−4.8
Labour hold		Swing	+2.8	

=== Elections in the 1930s ===
General election 1931: St Helens
Party	Candidate	Votes	%	±%
Conservative	Richard Austin Spencer	26,131	52.4	+11.0
Labour	James Sexton	23,701	47.6	−11.0
Majority		2,430	4.8	N/A
Turnout		49,832	78.9	+0.6
Conservative gain from Labour		Swing		

General election 1935: St Helens
Party	Candidate	Votes	%	±%
Labour	William Robinson	29,044	53.7	+6.1
Conservative	Richard Austin Spencer	25,063	46.3	−6.1
Majority		3,981	7.4	N/A
Turnout		54,107	82.6	+3.7
Labour gain from Conservative		Swing		

General Election 1939–40: Another General Election was required to take place before the end of 1940. The political parties had been making preparations for an election to take place and by the Autumn of 1939, the following candidates had been selected;

- Labour: William Robinson
- Conservative: S J Hill

=== Election in the 1940s ===
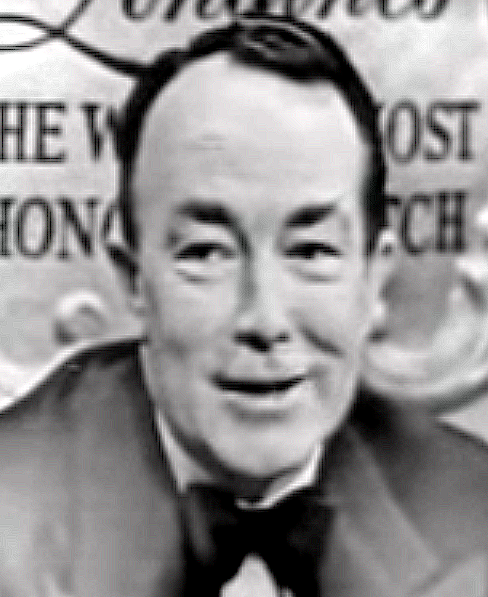
Shawcross

General election 1945: St Helens
Party	Candidate	Votes	%	±%
Labour	Hartley Shawcross	34,675	66.2	+12.5
Conservative	Frank Whitworth	17,686	33.8	−12.5
Majority		16,989	32.4	+25.0
Turnout		52,361	76.7	−5.9
Labour hold		Swing	+12.5	

=== Elections in the 1950s ===
General election 1950: St Helens
Party	Candidate	Votes	%	±%
Labour	Hartley Shawcross	39,514	63.2	−3.0
Conservative	Alfred Hall-Davis	20,741	33.18	−0.6
Liberal	Joseph H Winskill	2,263	3.6	New
Majority		18,773	30.0	−2.4
Turnout		62,518	84.9	+8.2
Labour hold		Swing		

General election 1951: St Helens
Party	Candidate	Votes	%	±%
Labour	Hartley Shawcross	37,688	63.3	+0.1
Conservative	Michael Hughes-Young	21,830	36.7	+3.5
Majority		15,858	26.6	−3.4
Turnout		59,518	79.7	−5.2
Labour hold		Swing		

General election 1955: St Helens
Party	Candidate	Votes	%	±%
Labour	Hartley Shawcross	35,737	64.3	+1.0
Conservative	Abram Maxwell Caplin	19,854	35.7	−1.0
Majority		15,883	28.6	+2.0
Turnout		55,591	73.5	−6.2
Labour hold		Swing		

1958 St Helens by-election
Party	Candidate	Votes	%	±%
Labour	Leslie Spriggs	26,405	64.7	+0.4
Conservative	Mark Carlisle	14,411	35.3	−0.4
Majority		11,994	29.4	+0.8
Turnout		40,816		
Labour hold		Swing		

General election 1959: St Helens
Party	Candidate	Votes	%	±%
Labour	Leslie Spriggs	35,961	62.1	−2.2
Conservative	Mark Carlisle	21,956	37.9	+2.2
Majority		14,005	24.2	−4.4
Turnout		57,917	76.9	+3.4
Labour hold		Swing		

=== Elections in the 1960s ===
General election 1964: St Helens
Party	Candidate	Votes	%	±%
Labour	Leslie Spriggs	34,137	67.0	+4.9
Conservative	Keith Speed	16,826	33.0	−4.9
Majority		17,311	34.0	+9.8
Turnout		50,963	72.3	−4.6
Labour hold		Swing		

General election 1966: St Helens
Party	Candidate	Votes	%	±%
Labour	Leslie Spriggs	33,325	70.8	+3.8
Conservative	Christopher C. Fielden	13,776	29.2	−3.8
Majority		19,549	41.6	+7.6
Turnout		47,101	68.6	−3.7
Labour hold		Swing		

=== Elections in the 1970s ===
General election 1970: St Helens
Party	Candidate	Votes	%	±%
Labour	Leslie Spriggs	31,587	65.7	−5.1
Conservative	Ian D. McGaw	16,509	34.3	+5.1
Majority		15,078	31.4	−10.2
Turnout		48,096	64.5	−4.1
Labour hold		Swing		

General election February 1974: St Helens
Party	Candidate	Votes	%	±%
Labour	Leslie Spriggs	32,621	59.0	−6.7
Liberal	AE Lycett	10,905	19.7	New
Conservative	KJ Bridgeman	10,752	19.5	−14.8
Ind. Labour Party	M Pike	991	1.8	New
Majority		21,716	39.3	+7.9
Turnout		55,269	73.2	+8.7
Labour hold		Swing		

General election October 1974: St Helens
Party	Candidate	Votes	%	±%
Labour	Leslie Spriggs	32,620	64.1	+5.1
Conservative	K.J. Bridgeman	10,554	20.8	+1.3
Liberal	A.E. Lycett	7,689	15.1	−4.6
Majority		22,066	43.3	+4.0
Turnout		50,863	66.9	−6.3
Labour hold		Swing		

General election 1979: St Helens
Party	Candidate	Votes	%	±%
Labour	Leslie Spriggs	32,489	59.6	−4.5
Conservative	J. Brown	16,934	31.1	+10.3
Liberal	Ian Smith	4,587	8.4	−6.7
Workers Revolutionary	J. Boylan	471	0.9	New
Majority		15,555	28.5	−14.8
Turnout		54,481	72.8	+5.9
Labour hold		Swing		

== Sources ==
- Leigh Rayment's Historical List of MPs – Constituencies beginning with "S" (part 1)
