= James Sexton =

British politician (1856–1938)

Sir James Sexton CBE
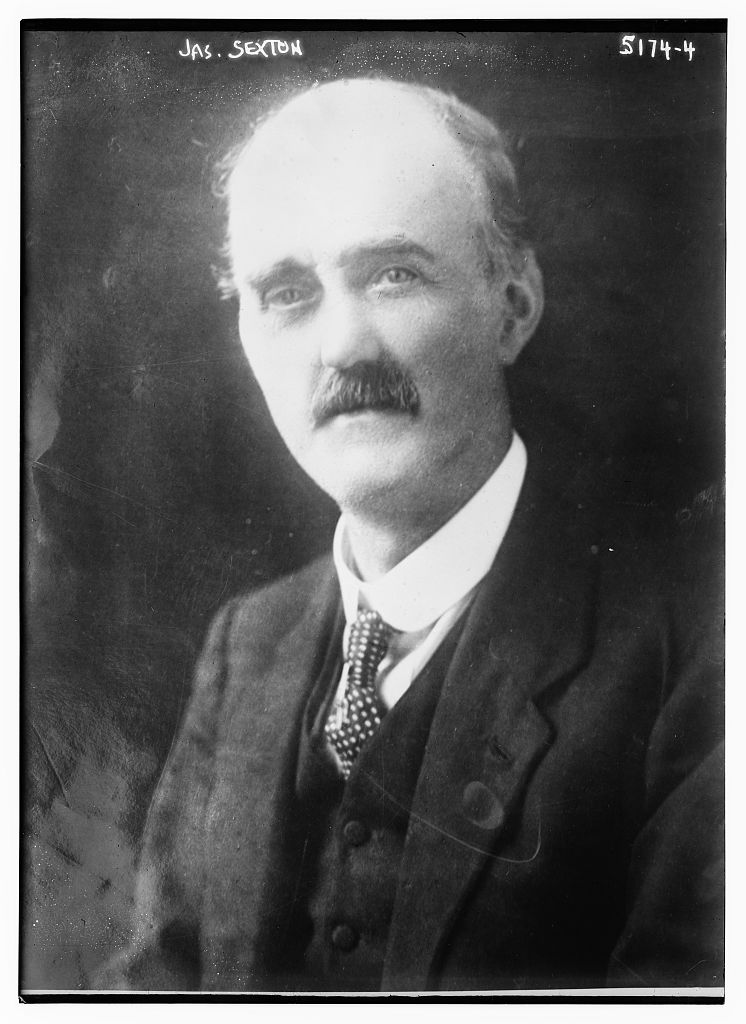
- Portrait from 1920

Member of Parliament for St Helens
- In office 14 December 1918 – 7 October 1931
- Preceded by: Rigby Swift
- Succeeded by: Richard Austin Spencer

Personal details
- Born: 13 April 1856 Newcastle upon Tyne, England
- Died: 27 December 1938 (aged 82) Liverpool, England
- Party: Labour

Sir James Sexton CBE (13 April 1856 – 27 December 1938) was a British trade unionist and politician.

== Early life ==
Sexton was born in Newcastle upon Tyne on 13 April 1856 to an Irish-born family of market traders, who shortly afterwards moved to a slum area of St Helens, Lancashire. He grew up in poverty and began work in the local glass-making industry at the age of nine after briefly attending school. His father and grandfather were active members of the Irish Republican Brotherhood and he accompanied his grandfather during his recruitment work for the organisation. The family home was once visited by Michael Davitt.

Sexton eventually wandered to Liverpool, where he worked as a sailor, then arrived in London after deserting the ship he was sailing on and took a job at a chemical factory. After three years onshore, he again became a sailor for a while, eventually returning to Liverpool as a docker on Liverpool Docks due to the death of his father. In 1884, he set up his own business as a coal merchant.

== Trade union activity ==
While working as a dock labourer he was extremely distraught by the living conditions of himself and his colleagues which were brought upon them by their wealthy bosses. He would often express this sentiment openly, which lead to him becoming blacklisted by most dock employers. Sexton then spent a year organising a local union that was shortly thereafter amalgamated into the Knights of Labor.

His local union workers held their first strike in 1885, which Sexton described as a "total failure", nonetheless the strike turned him, in his own words, into "an agitator and nothing but an agitator". During this time, Sexton also became active in the Irish Home Rule movement, however he ceased participating in it shortly after the Parnell split.

In 1889 he joined the new National Union of Dock Labourers (later National Union of Dock, Riverside and General Workers) and was elected general secretary in 1893. While in this position, he successfully lobbied for dock labourers and employers to be subject to the Factory and Workshop Act 1901, when previous Factory Acts had not included them. He engaged in much union, cross-union and political organising both in this position and thereafter. He was elected as general secretary of the Trades Union Congress in 1905.

== Political activity ==
Sexton was one of the founding members of the Independent Labour Party, one of the seven founders of the Liverpool branch. After unsuccessfully standing for Ashton-Under-Lyne in the 1895 general election, he later joined the Labour Party. During his time campaigning for the ILP, he became acquainted with figures such as Keir Hardie and James Larkin. He stood unsuccessfully for Liverpool West Toxteth in the 1906 general election and then served as Labour Member of Parliament for St Helens from 1918 to 1931. He also sat on Liverpool City Council from 1905 until his death. Up to 1930 Sexton was elected for the St Anne's ward then was replaced by Bessie Braddock before becoming an alderman. He was appointed Commander of the Order of the British Empire (CBE) in 1917 and knighted in 1931. In 1934, he was granted the freedom of the City of Liverpool. His autobiography, Sir James Sexton, Agitator: The Life of the Dockers' M.P., focusing mainly on his life in the trade union movement and politics in general, was published by Faber and Faber in 1936, with a preface by David Lloyd George.

Sexton died on 27 December 1938 at Liverpool, aged 82 years.

Parliament of the United Kingdom
Preceded by Rigby Swift	Member of Parliament for St Helens; 1918–1931	Succeeded by Richard Austin Spencer
Trade union offices
Preceded by Edward McHugh	General Secretary of the National Union of Dock Labourers; 1893–1922	Succeeded by Position abolished
Preceded by Richard Bell	President of the Trades Union Congress; 1905	Succeeded by D. C. Cummings
