= Ashton, Haydock and Bolton Miners' Trade Union =

The Ashton, Haydock and Bolton Miners' Trade Union represented coal miners in parts of Lancashire, in England.

The union was established in 1882, as the Ashton and Haydock District Miners' Trade Union, and it affiliated to the Lancashire and Cheshire Miners' Federation (LCMF). It initially had 2,346 members, but by 1884 this had fallen to 1884. In response, it reformed as a federation of 33 independent lodges, based in Bolton. This federation was officially known as the "Ashton, Haydock, Havannah, Whiston, Thatto Heath, Little Lever, Radcliffe and Kearsley, Pendlebury, Pendleton, Great Harwood and Burnley Miners' Trade Union", but in practice, the shorter name was always used. Unlike its predecessor, it offered friendly benefits to its members, and this proved successful in rapidly increasing its membership.

The union was the largest in the LCMF, and grew to well over 10,000 members, although its membership fell following the 1893 UK miners' strike. In 1897, it fully merged into the LCMF.
