= Sid Vincent =

British trade union leader

Sidney Vincent (13 May 1921 – 30 January 1992) was a British trade union leader.

Vincent worked as a miner in Lancashire, and became active in the National Union of Mineworkers (NUM). In 1971, he succeeded Joe Gormley as secretary of the Lancashire Area of the NUM. He was highly loyal to Gormley, and was rewarded with a place on the National Executive Committee of the Labour Party.

Vincent was not close to Arthur Scargill, who became the leading figure in the NUM, and in 1981, he considered standing in the election for the vice-president of the NUM, to prevent Scargill supporter Mick McGahey from winning, but ultimately decided against a contest. He questioned the decision to call the miners' strike of 1984 to 1985, but, once it had been called, he gave the strike his full support. For his Christmas holiday in 1984, Vincent went to Tenerife with his partner; much of the press reported negatively on this, as the strike was still ongoing.

Vincent retired in 1986, and suffered with pneumoconiosis prior to his death in 1992.

Trade union offices
Preceded by Leo Crossley	President of the Lancashire Area of the NUM; 1968–1971	Succeeded by E. Dooley
Preceded by Joe Gormley	General Secretary of the Lancashire Area of the NUM; 1972–1986	Succeeded by Roy Jackson
