= Robert Isherwood =

Robert Isherwood (1845 - 1905) was a miner's agent, local councillor and the first treasurer of the Lancashire and Cheshire Miners' Federation.

Robert Isherwood was the son of a handloom weaver in Tyldesley. He started pit work at the age of nine. In 1867 Isherwood acted as the local secretary in an industrial dispute and 19-week strike that ended with victory for the miners. With savings from his earnings, he set up in business as a building contractor and grocer but did not sever his links with the miners.

Isherwood was appointed secretary of the Leigh and District Miners' Association in 1875. After the death of William Pickard he became vice-president of the Lancashire and Cheshire Miners' Permanent Relief Society. He was treasurer of the Lancashire and Cheshire Miners' Federation when it was formed in 1881 until his death in 1905. Realising that local miners had no place to meet, he was instrumental in building Tyldesley Miners' Hall which cost £2,500 in 1893.

A Liberal in politics, he was a member of the Tyldesley Local Board, a councillor for Tyldesley Urban District and its chairman in 1897–1898.

Isherwood died in January, 1905. On the day of his funeral, the streets between his home and Tyldesley Top Chapel were lined with mourners. Deputations and officials from local pits and branches affiliated to the LCMF attended the cemetery. Isherwood was well-respected in mining communities and the union movement. A 12 feet 4 inch high monument made of Aberdeen granite weighing eight tons and costing £150 was erected to Robert Isherwood's memory in Tyldesley cemetery. The monument was unveiled by Enoch Edwards M. P., President of the Miners' Federation of Great Britain in recognition of his services to the miners of the district.

Trade union offices
Preceded by New position	Treasurer of the Lancashire and Cheshire Miners' Federation; 1881–1905	Succeeded by Thomas Glover
