= Ted Hall =

Ted Hall may refer to:

- Ted Hall (footballer) (1876–1903), Australian rules footballer
- Theodore Hall (1925–1999), American physicist and atomic spy for the Soviet Union

== See also ==
- Teddy Hall (disambiguation)
- Edward Hall (disambiguation)
