= Cleone Benest =

English engineer

- Benest, ca. 1908, image by F. Piggott
- Born: Cleone de Heveningham Benest; 13 June 1880; Forest Gate, East London, England
- Died: 23 December 1963 (aged 83); Poole, Dorset, England
- Other names: C. Griff, C. de Benest, Cleone de Heveningham B. Griff
- Occupation: engineer
- Years active: 1907–1953

Cleone Benest (13 June 1880 – 23 December 1963), also known by the pseudonym C. Griff, was a pioneering motorist, as well as an engineer, and metallurgist. She was one of the first women engineers to pass mechanical examinations of the City and Guilds of London Institute, Royal Automobile Club, and Portsmouth Municipal College. She published articles on engineering and established her own firm which was both managed and run by women. She served as the chair of the Women's Engineering Society from 1922 to 1926.

== Early life ==
Cleone de Heveningham Benest was born on 13 June 1880, Forest Gate, London, to Edith Maria (née Powell) and George Philip Benest. In her youth, her parents separated and Benest was taken to St. Aubin, on the Isle of Jersey, to live with her mother and maternal grandparents, Eliza and Thomas Powell. In the early 1890s the family moved to Ryde, on the Isle of Wight.

== Career ==
By the early 1900s, Benest had earned a reputation as pioneering motorist and owned a 1906 Lanchester Motor Company 12-hp tonneau and a 12-hp Fiat, which she maintained in her own workshop. In 1907, Benest wrote to the Institution of Automobile Engineers (IAE) to ascertain if women were allowed to be admitted. By 1908, she had passed the City and Guilds of London Institute's motor-engineering examination, the Royal Automobile Club's mechanical test, and was a certified driver. She was noted as the first woman to have taken the motor engineering examination and first to drive a motor omnibus, having driven the Milnes-Daimler and Thornycroft buses for the Isle of Wight Express Motor Syndicate Ltd.

Benest competed in motorsport competitions and through 1911 was a fencer with the British Ladies Fencing Association. In 1910, she took the Portsmouth Municipal College examination for heat engines and that same year entered a design for a speed alarm in the competition sponsored by Flight magazine. The only entry by a woman among the 39 competitors, her design was published in the magazine. By 1915, Benest was using the professional name of C. Griff, sometimes known also as Cleone or Clayton Griff, and operated a consulting business on automotive, electrical, and mechanical engineering. Her firm was located in Dover Street in Mayfair, conveniently next to the headquarters of the Women's Engineering Society and she not only repaired mechanical devices but offered courses in motor mechanics. Publishing an article in 1915 in Englishwoman's Year Book, Benest argued that with increasing use of machinery, there was growing need for training women as engineers.

During World War I Benest/Griff became an aircraft engine inspector and moved to The Midlands. She first worked for the British Thomson-Houston Company and later for Vickers Limited. In 1920 she joined the Women's Engineering Society and was elected its chair in 1922, serving through 1926. She wrote articles for The Women Engineer journal and gave several talks on radio about engineering. Around the same time, she began attending meetings of the Institute of Automobile Engineers, as an invited guest, since their official bylaws banned women as members. In 1922, she founded a company, The Stainless Steel and Non-Corrosive Metals Company Limited, in Birmingham. Her directors included other women, like Gabrielle Borthwick, Gertrude Crawford, and C. Davis, a former foundry manager. The firm received wide press coverage for being managed by and employing women. Using Benest's colouring method, the company manufactured lamp reflectors, ornaments, railway fittings and other items, before it folded in 1925.

Throughout the 1920s, Benest/Griff published articles and gave talks on stainless steel and its application to industry. As a regular writer for the Woman Engineer, she wrote on aviation and driving through 1927 and broadcast talks on the programme Afternoon Topics, sponsored by BBC Radio about engineering and electrical applications for housewives. She remained in Birmingham until 1928, when she abruptly ended her membership in the Women's Engineering Society and stopped using the name of Griff. She may have returned to Ryde to care for her ailing mother, who died in 1930.

By the beginning of World War II, Benest was again living in England, with an engineer, Frederick J. Crinage in Olney, Buckinghamshire. She registered with the Women's Land Army and advertised services not only as a mechanical engineer and metallurgist, but as a "Gyrotillage executive". Gyrotillers were a massive, industrial-grade agricultural ploughing machine used to prepare earth for food production; it is unknown whether Benest operated the machinery or maintained it. She remained in Olney until 1953 and subsequently lived in Dorset.

== Death and legacy ==
Benest died on 23 December 1963 in Poole. She is remembered as one of England's pioneering women engineers.
