= Edith Helen Pratt =

British civil servant, military officer (1882–1959)

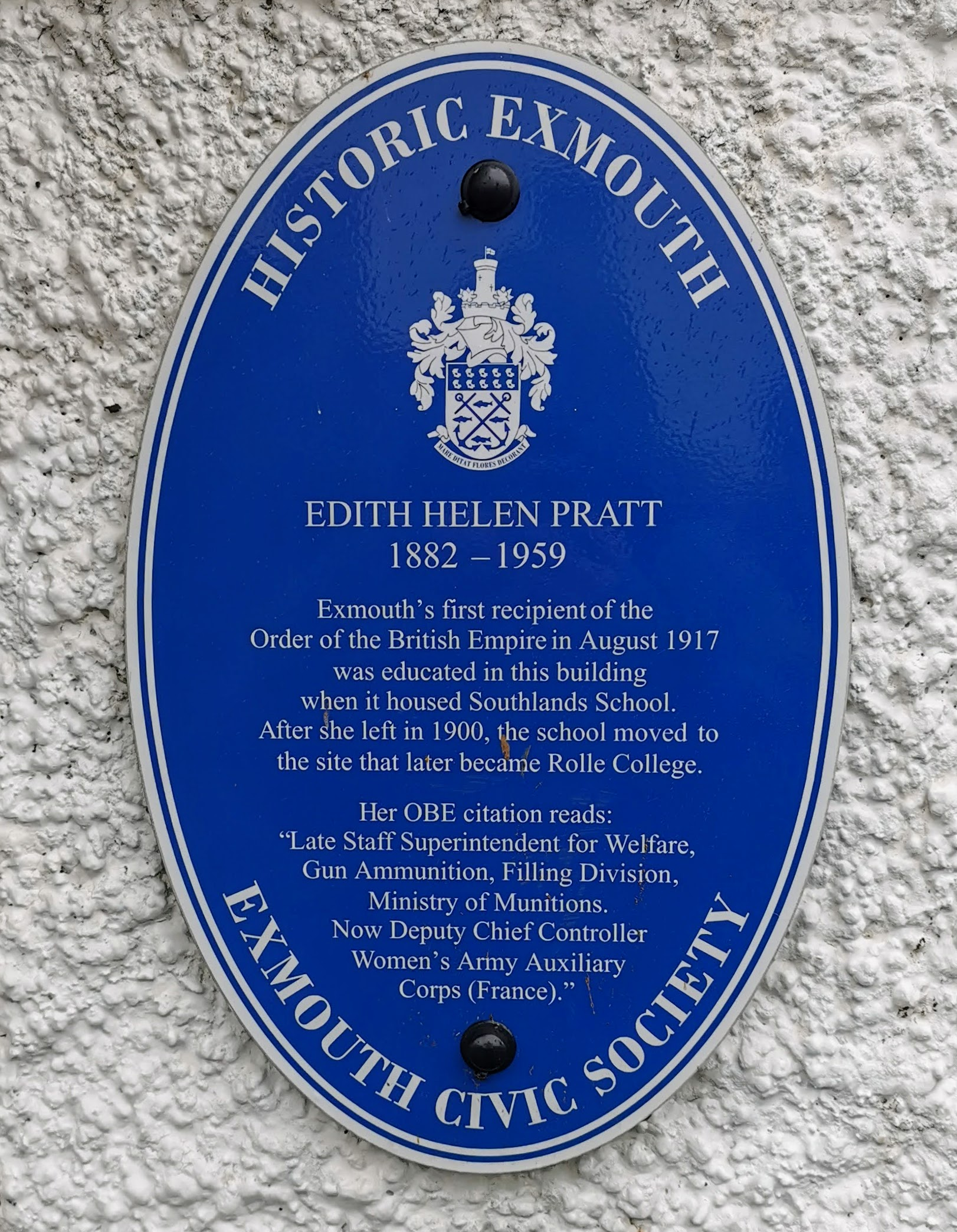
Blue plaque at the site of Edith Helen Pratt's former school

Edith Helen Pratt OBE (1882 – 1959) was a British civil servant and Women's Army Auxiliary Corps and Women's Royal Air Force officer. In 1917, she received her OBE in recognition of her service during the First World War, and later achieved the rank of deputy commander.

== Early life and education ==
Pratt was born 20 December 1882 at the family home of Prattshayes, Littleham, Devon. She attended Southlands School, Exmouth, which carries a blue plaque for her. Educated at Girton College, Cambridge, she gained her BA (Hons) from the University of London in 1905. Between 1909 and 1917, she was a teacher of modern languages and philosophy.

== First World War service ==
During the First World War, Pratt held the posts of Staff Inspector of National Filling Factories (August 1915 – March 1917) and Deputy Chief Controller In France for the Women's Army Auxiliary Corps (March 1917 – 1918), during which time she was awarded the OBE in the first honours list in 1917.

She became Deputy Commandant of the WRAF, but resigned in 1918 after mistreatment by Commandant Violet Douglas-Pennant.

== Civil service and other positions ==
In 1920 Pratt was appointed general inspector of women's agricultural education at the Ministry of Agriculture and Fisheries. From 1921 to 1933 she was joint honorary secretary of the British Federation of University Women.

She passed the bar examination in 1923, the year after Ivy Williams became the first English woman to do so.

In the 1920s and 1930s, she published journal articles on the role of women in agriculture and campaigned for women's employment rights.

She supported the domestic food production efforts of the Women's Land Army and the Women's Institute in World War II.

After her retirement from the civil service, she became honorary secretary of the Associated Country Women of the World.

== Death and legacy ==
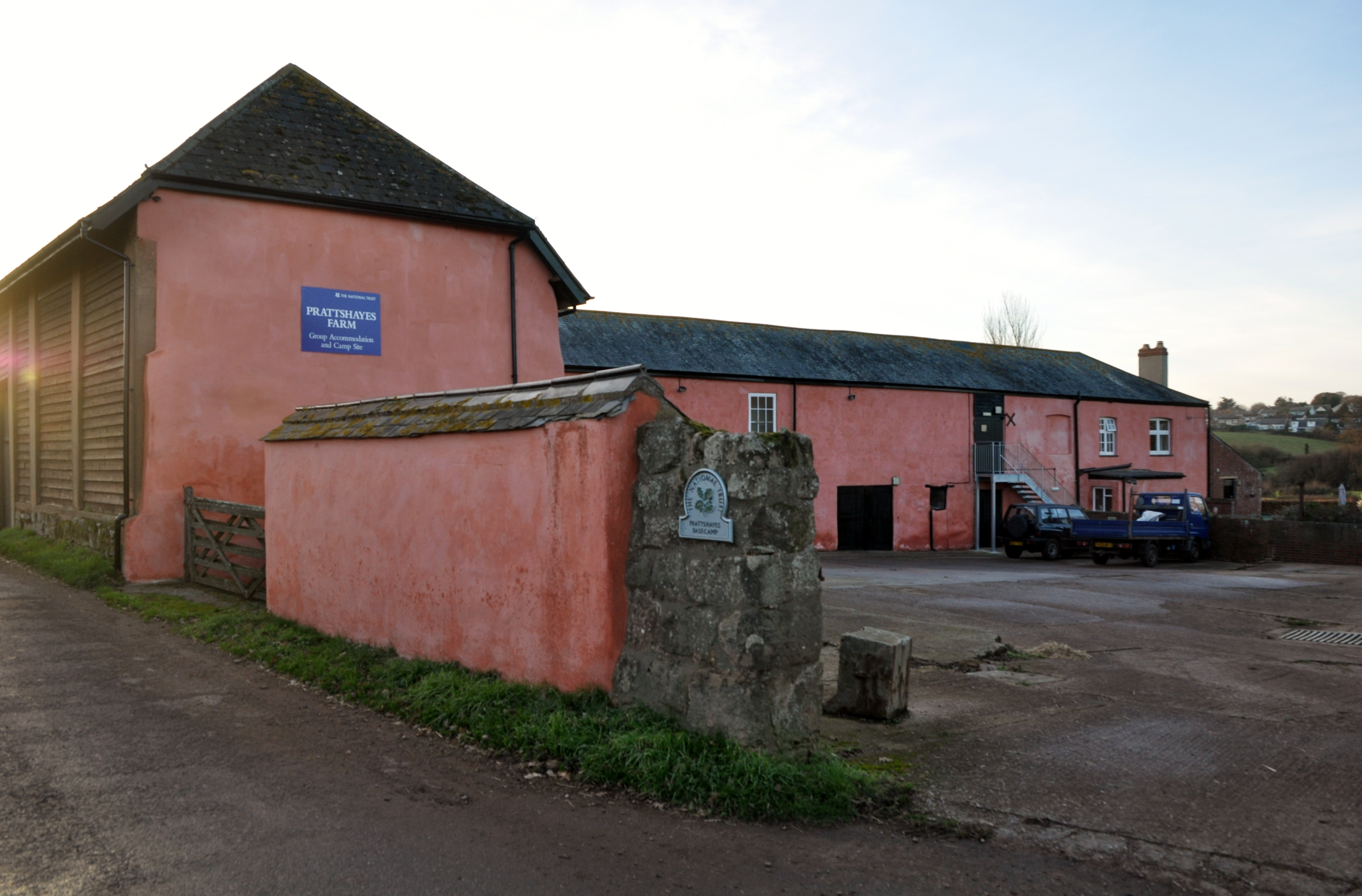
Prattshayes Farm, which Edith Pratt left to the National Trust

Pratt died in London on 14 May 1959.

From the 1920s, the Pratt family home, Prattshayes, had hosted camping trips for local children. Edith left Prattshayes to the National Trust in 1960, intending that it continue to be used for camping.

In August 2017, the blue plaque commemorating Edith Pratt was unveiled at The Swallows Guest House, the former site of the Southlands School. The event took place exactly 100 years after news of her OBE was first published in The Times.
