= Gabrielle Borthwick =

British mechanic (1866–1952)

Honourable Gabrielle Borthwick
- Born: Gabrielle Margaret Ariana Borthwick; 30 June 1866; London
- Died: 10 October 1952 (aged 86); Broadbridge Heath, Sussex
- Known for: Motorist and mechanic

Gabrielle Borthwick (30 June 1866 – 10 October 1952) was a pioneering motorist and mechanic. She was one of the early wealthy women motorists to set up a garage and a school for teaching men and women to drive cars. She was chairman of the executive committee for the Women’s Automobile and Sports Association which was associated with the Royal Automobile Club.

== Early life ==
Hon. Gabrielle Margaret Ariana Borthwick was born on 30 June 1866. She was the eldest daughter of Alice Day and the 19th Lord Borthwick, Cunninghame Borthwick. As a young woman, she had been presented at court but never went on to marry. Borthwick spent time in Florence where it was rumored that she had had a lesbian affair.

== Hermetic Order of the Golden Dawn ==
Borthwick was initiated as a member of the Hermetic Order of the Golden Dawn in July 1891.

== Career ==
By 1914, Borthwick was involved with establishing Women's unions, including the Society of Women Motor Drivers, an idea which had come from the women's suffrage movement. In 1915, she placed an advertisement for The Ladies’ Automobile Workshops in the Church League for Women’s Suffrage paper promising “Ladies trained by ladies. All branches of motoring taught" for her Mayfair garage.

During the First World War Borthwick provided training for men who needed to know how to drive and maintain cars, as well as to women who became drivers in various roles such as ambulance drivers in France and Serbia. This was later described as “splendid work during the war in teaching hundreds of girls the mechanism and driving of cars”. Her garage, the Borthwick's Ladies' Automobile Workshops in Brick Street in Picadilly, London was an RAC agent into the 1920s. In the early 1920s, the garage featured a restaurant and residential club for chauffeurs.

She was elected to the first Council of the Women's Engineering Society in 1920, and contributed articles to their journal, The Woman Engineer.

Borthwick was also a Director of The Stainless Steel and Non-Corrosive Metals Company Limited, set up in Birmingham in 1922 by Cleone Benest, at that time using the name C Griff. Other directors of the company included Gertrude Crawford, and C. Davis, a former foundry manager. The firm received wide press coverage for being managed by and employing women. Using Benest's colouring method, the company manufactured lamp reflectors, ornaments, railway fittings and other items, before it folded in 1925.

== Later life ==
Gabrielle Borthwick died on 10 October 1952 in Broadbridge Heath, Sussex.
