= Thomas Glover (politician) =

Miner and Labour Party politician in the United Kingdom

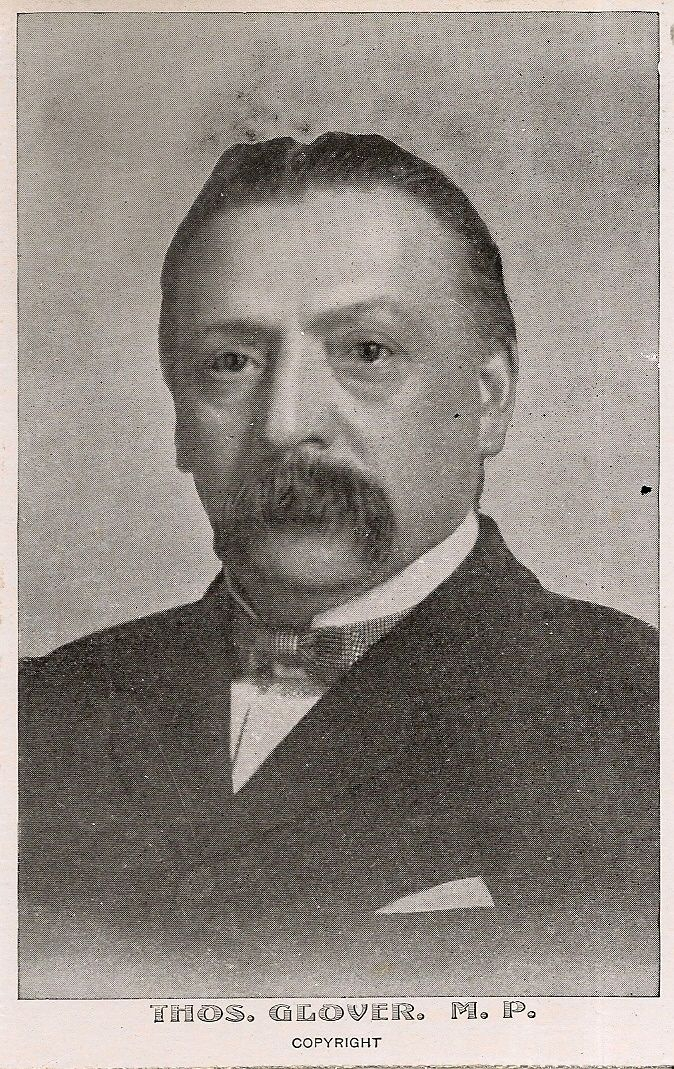

Thomas Glover (25 March 1852 – 9 January 1913) was a miner and Labour Party politician in the United Kingdom.

He was elected as the Member of Parliament (MP) for St Helens at the 1906 general election, defeating the sitting Conservative Party MP Henry Seton-Karr. He was re-elected in January 1910 with a reduced majority, but at the December 1910 general election he was defeated by the Conservative candidate Rigby Swift.

Prior to standing for parliament Thomas Glover was a magistrate and miners agent for the St Helens district. In 1893 he issued a circular forcing all men to join the union and introducing monthly card checks. This action by a magistrate using J.P. initials was queried in parliament by Baron Henry De Worms but the home secretary found it not to be illegal.

Parliament of the United Kingdom
Preceded by Henry Seton-Karr	Member of Parliament for St Helens; 1906 – December 1910	Succeeded by Rigby Swift
Trade union offices
Preceded by Robert Isherwood	Treasurer of the Lancashire and Cheshire Miners' Federation; 1905–1913	Succeeded by Harry Roughley
