= William Albert Robinson =

British politician (1877–1949)

Member of Parliament for St Helens
- In office 14 November 1935 – 15 June 1945
- Preceded by: Richard Austin Spencer
- Succeeded by: Hartley Shawcross

Personal details
- Born: 1877
- Died: 31 December 1949 (aged 72)
- Political party: Labour

William Albert Robinson (1877 – 31 December 1949) was a British Labour Party politician who served as the Member of Parliament (MP) for St Helens from his election at the 1935 general election until the 1945 election.

== Career ==
Robinson had previously fought Liverpool Exchange at the 1929 general election. He was elected Member of Parliament (MP) for St Helens at the 1935 general election and served until the 1945 election.

He was an active member of the National Union of Distributive and Allied Workers, for which he had served as Political Secretary.

== Personal life ==
Robinson died on 31 December 1949.

Parliament of the United Kingdom
| Preceded by Richard Austin Spencer | Member of Parliament for St Helens; 1935 – 1945 | Succeeded by Hartley Shawcross |
Party political offices
| Preceded by Walter R. Smith | Chair of the Labour Party; 1934–1935 | Succeeded by Jennie Adamson |
