= Helen Gwynne-Vaughan =

British mycologist and botanist

Chief Controller Dame Helen Gwynne-Vaughan GBE
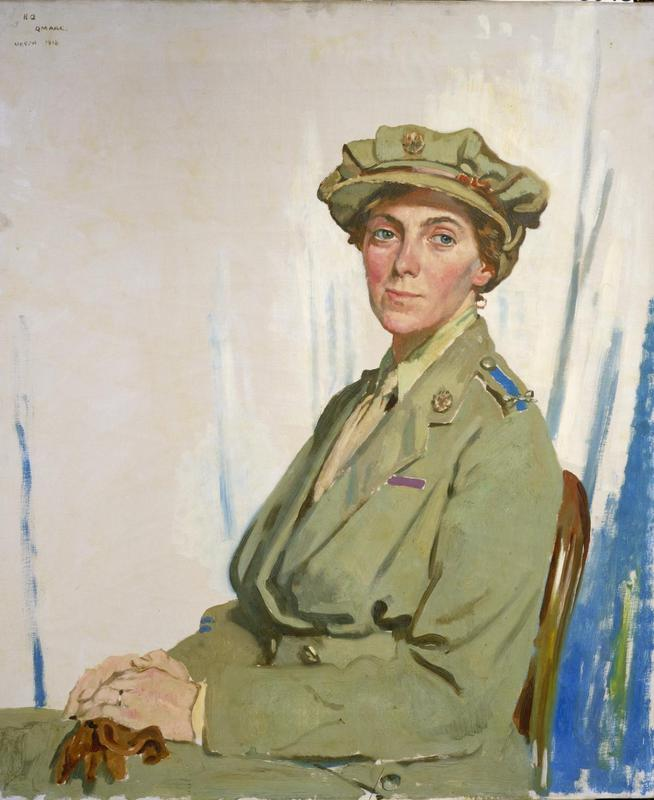
- Portrait by William Orpen, 1918
- Born: Helen Charlotte Isabella Fraser; 21 January 1879; Westminster, London, England
- Died: 26 August 1967 (aged 88); Storrington, Sussex, England
- Spouse(s): David Thomas Gwynne-Vaughan (m. 1911–1915, his death)
- Military career
- Allegiance: United Kingdom
- Branch: Auxiliary Territorial Service
- Rank: Director
- Units: First Chief Controller, Queen Mary's Army Auxiliary Corps (QMAAC) in France
- Commands: Women's Royal Air Force

Dame Helen Charlotte Isabella Gwynne-Vaughan, GBE (née Fraser; 21 January 1879 – 26 August 1967) was a prominent English botanist and mycologist. During the First World War, she served in the Women's Army Auxiliary Corps and then as Commandant of the Women's Royal Air Force (WRAF) from 1918 to 1919. During the Second World War, from 1939 to 1941, she served as Chief Controller of the Auxiliary Territorial Service (ATS).

== Early life and education ==
Helen Charlotte Isabella Fraser was born on 21 January 1879 in Westminster, London, England. She was the elder daughter of Army Captain the Honourable Arthur Hay David Fraser (1852–1884; son of Alexander Fraser, 18th Lord Saltoun), and Lucy Jane (died 1939), daughter of Major Robert Duncan Fergusson, of the Rifle Brigade and the Royal Ayrshire and Wigton Rifle militia. Lucy Fraser was a novelist and extra lady-in-waiting to HRH Princess Beatrice; in 1887, having been widowed, she remarried, to diplomat Francis Hay-Newton.

Due to her stepfather's career, Fraser spent a large amount of her youth living abroad and was educated mainly by governesses. From 1895 to 1896, she was educated at Cheltenham Ladies' College, an all-girls private boarding school in Cheltenham, Gloucestershire.

In 1899, she attended the ladies' department of King's College, London to study for the University of Oxford entrance exams. However, she stayed on at King's College as one of its first female students to study botany and zoology. She was awarded the Carter Medal in 1902, and graduated from the University of London with a Bachelor of Science (BSc) degree in 1904. She also studied under Margaret Jane Benson, head of the Department of Botany at Royal Holloway College. She was awarded a Doctor of Science (DSc) degree in 1907.

== Career ==
=== Academic career ===
Having completed her bachelor's degree, she spent 1904 working as a demonstrator for mycologist V. H. Blackman at University College, London. She moved to Royal Holloway College in 1905 as a demonstrator to botanist Margaret Jane Benson. She was promoted to assistant lecturer in 1906. In 1907, she was awarded a D.Sc. degree for her research into fungal reproduction, and she was appointed a lecturer in botany at University College, Nottingham. In 1909, she was named head of the botany department at Birkbeck College, London. From 1917 to 1919, she took a break from academia to serve during the First World War.

In 1920 she applied for the Regius Professor of Botany at the University of Aberdeen; she was not successful. Instead, she returned to Birkbeck College and was appointed Professor of Botany in 1921. She continued her studies on fungal genetics. She was Head of department from 1921 to 1939 and again from 1941 to 1944. She retired from full-time academia in 1944 and was appointed Professor Emeritus by the University of London.

=== Military service ===
In 1917, she was appointed Controller of the Women's Army Auxiliary Corps in France, alongside Mona Chalmers Watson, Chief Controller of the WAAC in London. For her service, she was the first woman to be awarded a military Dame Commander of the Order of the British Empire (DBE) in January 1918. She served reluctantly as Commandant of the Women's Royal Air Force (WRAF) from September 1918 until December 1919.

Gwynne-Vaughan was first made Chief Controller of the Auxiliary Territorial Service (ATS) in 1939. This was a role that Mary Baxter Ellis had turned down as she preferred to lead the volunteer First Aid Nursing Yeomanry (FANYs). Ellis agreed however to supply 1500 women to serve with the ATS as long as the rest of the FANY could be independent. This was agreed but Gwynne-Vaughan broke the agreement and forced the FANY to be absorbed. Gwynne-Vaughan held the role to 1941.

=== Other work ===
Gwynne-Vaughan was interested in politics. While she was at Royal Holloway College she and Louisa Garrett Anderson co-founded the University of London Suffrage Society. In 1926 she spoke as part of a National Union of Societies for Equal Citizenship meeting.

She stood in the 1922 London County Council election as a Municipal Reform Party councillor for Camberwell North; she was not elected. She stood as the Unionist parliamentary candidate for Camberwell North in the 1922, 1923, and 1924 General Elections. She lost by 254 votes in 1922, by 4686 in 1923, and by 3736 in 1924.

She was also active in Girl Guides and was honoured with the Silver Fish. In 1930, Gwynne-Vaughan chaired the Guides' Sixth World Conference. At this conference, the constitution of the World Association of Girl Guides and Girl Scouts was agreed and Olave Baden-Powell was unanimously voted World Chief Guide.

After her retirement in 1944 she was the full-time honorary secretary of the London branch of the Soldiers', Sailors' and Air Force Association until 1962.

== Personal life ==
In 1911, she married David Thomas Gwynne-Vaughan FRSE FLS (1871–1915), whom she had succeeded as head of the botany department at Birkbeck College, London. Her husband died from tuberculosis after four years of marriage, and they did not have any children. She died at her home in Storrington, Sussex, in 1967, aged 88.

== Honours and distinctions ==
In the 1919 King's Birthday Honours, Gwynne-Vaughan was appointed a Dame Commander of the Order of the British Empire (DBE) "in recognition of distinguished services rendered during the War", and was therefore granted the title Dame. In the 1929 King's Birthday Honours, she was promoted to Dame Grand Cross of the Order of the British Empire (GBE) "for public and scientific services".

She was elected to the Linnean Society in 1905 and awarded its Trail Medal in 1920.

She was the president of the British Mycological Society in 1928.

Fungal species named in her honour include Palaeoendogone gwynne-vaughaniae and Pleurage gwynne-vaughaniae.

English Heritage unveiled a blue plaque in Gwynne-Vaughan's honour in March 2020, placed on the house on Bedford Avenue in Bloomsbury London, where she lived for nearly 50 years.

Military offices
Preceded by Violet Douglas-Pennant	Commandant, Women's Royal Air Force; 1918–1919	Succeeded by Appointment abolished
Preceded by New appointment	Director, Auxiliary Territorial Service; 1939–1941	Succeeded by Mrs Jean Knox
