= Gruban v Booth =

1917 English fraud case

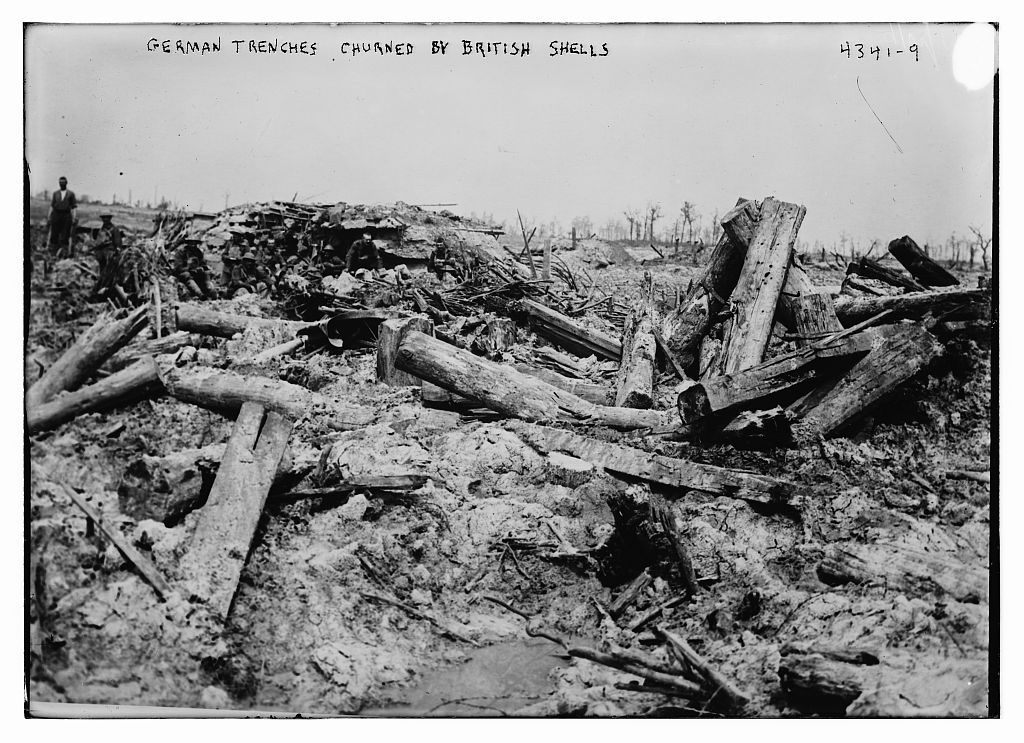
- Court: Queen's Bench Division of the High Court of Justice of England and Wales
- Full case name: John Gruban v Frederick Handel Booth
- Decided: 1917

Case history
- Subsequent action: none
- Related actions: earlier habeas corpus appeal for release from internment as a probable or under-investigation national threat, won by claimant

Court membership
- Judge sitting: Mr Justice Coleridge

Case opinions
- Decision by: Jury. In legal procedure and precedent directed by judge.

Keywords
- Member of Parliament; abuse of position; defrauding, deprivation of asset

Gruban v Booth was a 1917 fraud case in England that generated significant publicity because the defendant, Frederick Handel Booth, was a Member of Parliament. Gruban was a German-born businessman who ran several factories that made tools for manufacturing munitions for the First World War. In an effort to find government contracts and money to expand his business, he contacted a businessman and MP, Frederick Handel Booth, who willingly promised both. Booth sought agreement from Gruban to have 10% of a large order's price, to be hidden from the rest of the board; tricked Gruban into transferring the company, and had him interned under wartime regulations to prevent a claim against him.

Gruban successfully appealed against his internment and as soon as he was freed brought Booth to court. The case was so popular that the involved barristers found it physically difficult to get into the court each day because of the size of the crowds gathered outside. Although those on both sides were noted for their skill, the case went almost entirely one way, with the jury taking only ten minutes to find Booth guilty. It was one of the first noted cases of Patrick Hastings, and his victory in it led to him applying to become a King's Counsel.

== Background ==
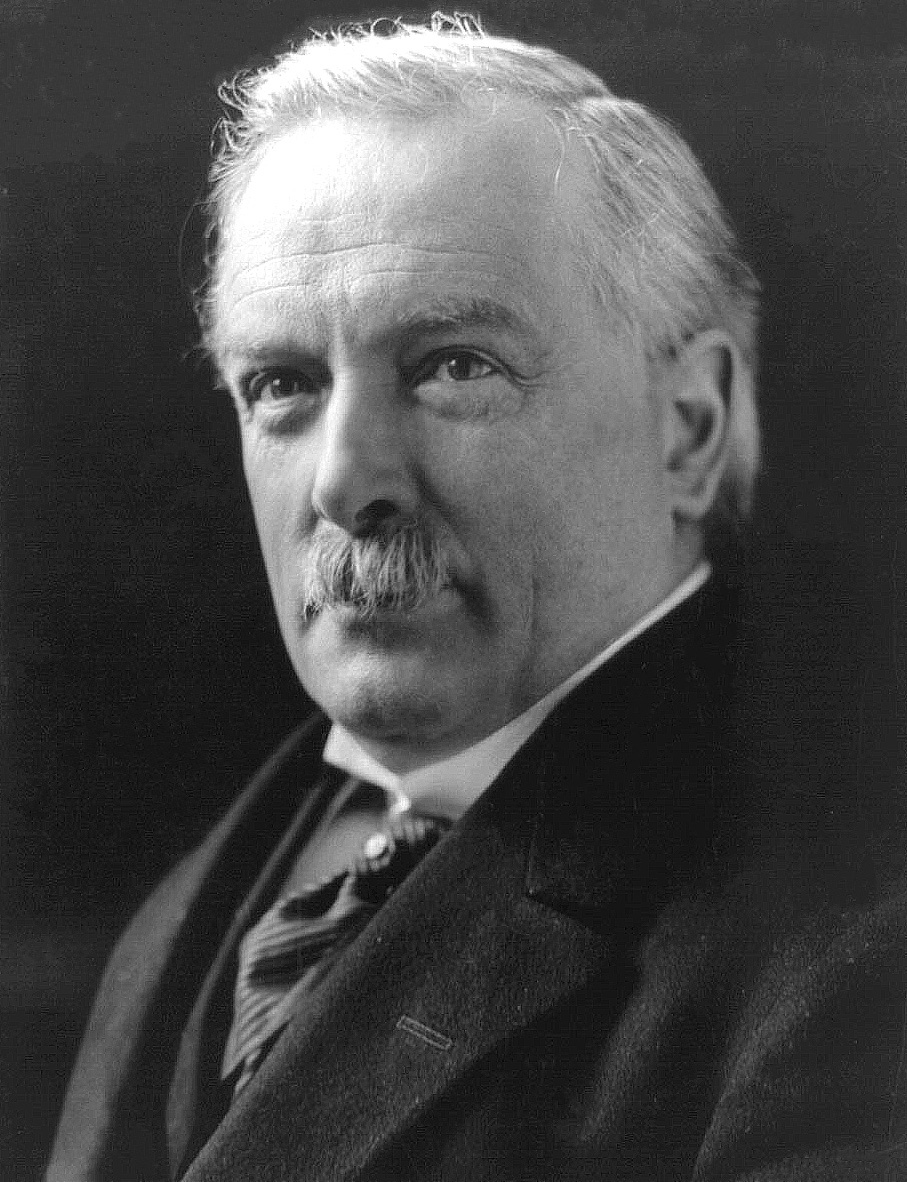
David Lloyd George, the Minister of Munitions

John Gruban was a German-born businessman, originally named Johann Wilhelm Gruban, who had come to England in 1893 to work for an engineering company, Haigh and Company. By 1913, he had turned the business from an almost-bankrupt company to a successful manufacturer of machine tools. At the outbreak of the First World War, it was one of the first companies to produce machine tools to make munitions. That made Gruban a major player in a now-large market, and he attempted to raise £5,000 to expand his business. On independent advice, he contacted Frederick Handel Booth, a noted Liberal Member of Parliament who was chairman of the Yorkshire Iron and Coal Company and had led the government inquiry into the Marconi scandal. When Gruban contacted Booth, Booth told him that he could do "more for [your] company than any man in England" and claimed that David Lloyd George, then Minister of Munitions, and many other important government officials were close friends. With £3,500 borrowed from his brother-in-law, Booth immediately invested in Gruban's company.

The sinking of the RMS Lusitania in 1915 created a wave of anti-German sentiment, and Gruban worried that he would find it difficult to find government work because of his nationality and thick German accent. He again contacted Booth, who again claimed to be friends with Lloyd George and his secretary, Christopher Addison. Booth also said that if Gruban put Booth on the board of directors, he could "do with the Ministry of Munitions what I like". Gruban immediately made Booth the chairman of his company, and over three months took £400 on expenses. He then claimed that it was not enough money for the work he did and that he should get a semi-secret payment of 10% of the value of a contract, known as the "Birmingham Contract". The contract was worth £6,000, and Booth wrote a memo saying that he should have £580 or £600. Gruban refused. Booth threw the refusal in the wastepaper basket. From then on, Booth worked as hard as he could to undermine Gruban's position but outwardly appeared to be his friend.

Over the next few months, a series of complaints came from the Ministry of Munitions about Gruban's work and his German origins and ended in a written statement by Lloyd George's private secretary that it was "undesirable that any person of recent German nationality or association should at the present time be connected in an important capacity with any company or firm engaged in the production of munitions of war". Booth showed it to Gruban and told him that the only way to save the company and prevent Gruban being interned was for him to transfer the ownership of the company to Booth. Gruban did so, and Booth immediately "came out in his true colours" by treating Gruban with contempt and refusing to help support his wife and family now that Gruban had no income. Eventually, Booth wrote to the Ministry of Munitions to say that Gruban had "taken leave of his senses", and the Ministry had Gruban interned.

Gruban appealed against the internment order and was called before a court, consisting of Mr Justice Younger and Mr Justice Sankey. After reviewing the facts of the case and the stories of Gruban and Booth, the judges ordered the immediate release of Gruban and recommended that he seek legal advice to see if he could regain control of his company. After he was released Gruban found a solicitor, W.J. Synott, who gave the case to Patrick Hastings.

== Trial ==
Hastings felt that his best chances lay in interviewing Christopher Addison about his contact with Booth. As Addison was a government minister, he could be relied on to tell the truth. The case of Gruban v Booth opened on 7 May 1917 at the King's Bench Division of the High Court of Justice in front of Mr Justice Coleridge. Patrick Hastings and Hubert Wallington represented Gruban, and Booth was represented by Rigby Swift KC and Douglas Hogg.

As counsel for the prosecution, Hastings was the first barrister to speak. In his opening speech to the jury, he criticised Booth for loving money rather than his country and said that one of the things that the English prided themselves on was fair play, and "no matter how loudly the defendant raises the cry of patriotism, I feel sure that your sense of fair play, gentlemen, will ensure a verdict that the defendant is unfit to sit in the House of Commons, as he has been guilty of fraud". Hastings then called Gruban to the witness stand and asked him to tell the jury what had happened. Gruban described how Booth had claimed to have influence over David Lloyd George. Gruban was then cross-examined by Rigby Swift.

Booth was then called to the witness stand and initially claimed that Gruban had claimed to be "a very powerful man" and that it had been a case of Gruban using his power to help Booth, not the other way around. He was still in the witness box when the court day ended, and the next morning, it was announced that Christopher Addison had come to the court. The judge allowed Addison to give his testimony before they continued with Booth, and during a cross-examination by Hastings, Addison stated that he had not been advising Booth in any way and that "to say that Gruban's only chance of escape from internment was to hand over his shares to Mr Booth was a lie".

The final witness was Booth himself. He stated that he would never have asked for a 10% commission on the Birmingham contract and that he had never claimed that he could influence government ministers. Hastings showed the jury that both statements were lies, first by showing the piece of paper Booth had scribbled the "Birmingham contract" memo on and then by showing a telegram from Booth to Gruban in which Booth claimed that he "[had] already spoken to a Cabinet Minister and high official".

In his summing up Mr Justice Coleridge was "on the whole unfavourable to Booth". He also pointed out that the German nationality of Gruban might prejudice the jury and asked it to "be sure that you permit no prejudice on their hand to disturb the balance of the scales of justice". The jury decided the case in only ten minutes, found Booth guilty and awarded Gruban £4,750.

== Sources ==
- Hyde, H Montgomery (1960). Sir Patrick Hastings, his life and cases. London: Heinemann. OCLC 498180.
