= Henry Seton-Karr =

British politician

Sir Henry Carba Seton-Karr
- Born: 5 February 1853; U.K.
- Died: 29 May 1914 (aged 61); RMS Empress of Ireland, St. Lawrence River
- Resting place: Mount Hermon Cemetery, Sillery, Quebec, Canada
- Education: Corpus Christi College, Oxford (MA)
- Occupations: Explorer, hunter, author, politician
- Spouse(s): Edith Eliza Pilkington (1880–1884) (her death); Jane Jarvie Thorburn (1886–1914) (his death)

Sir Henry Seton-Karr CMG DL (5 February 1853 – 29 May 1914) was an English explorer, hunter and author and a Conservative politician who sat in the House of Commons from 1885 to 1906.

Seton-Karr, born in India in 1853, was the son of George Berkeley Seton-Karr, of the Indian Civil Service (resident Commissioner at Baroda during the Indian Mutiny); and his wife Eleanor, the daughter of Henry Usborne of Branches Park, Suffolk. He was educated at Harrow School and Corpus Christi College, University of Oxford, gaining an MA in law in 1876. He was called to the bar at Lincoln's Inn in 1879. Seton-Karr owned a cattle ranch (Pick Ranch) in Wyoming, USA and was a director of Capitol Freehold Land and Investment Co. He was an explorer, big-game hunter and writer.

Seton-Karr was elected as the Member of Parliament (MP) for St Helens in the 1885 general election and held the seat until his defeat at the 1906 general election. He did not stand again in St Helens, but at the January 1910 general election he stood unsuccessfully in Berwickshire.

Due to the string of defeats during the early months of the Second Boer War (1899–1902), the British government realised in late 1899 that they were going to need more troops than just the regular army, thus issuing a Royal Warrant to create the Imperial Yeomanry, a volunteer force. At the suggestion of Seton-Karr, the 18th Battalion was raised in early 1900, funded by the Earl of Dunraven and designated as "Sharpshooters". Unlike most IY battalions, which were formed from the existing Yeomanry regiments providing service companies of approximately 115 men each, the Sharpshooters were selected from volunteers who could prove their skill with a rifle and their horsemanship. Seton-Karr was present when the battalion left Southampton for service in South Africa on the SS Galeka in early April 1900. After the end of the war, he was made a Companion of the Order of St Michael and St George (CMG) in October 1902, and a month later he was among the new knights bachelor in the King's 1902 Birthday Honours list, following which he was formally knighted on 18 December 1902.

He became a Deputy Lieutenant of Roxburghshire in 1896. He was also Chairman of the Liverpool, St Helens and South Lancashire Railway at the time of its opening in 1900 and Chairman of the Lancashire and Cheshire Workingmen's Federation in the late 1890s.

On 11 November 1880 Seton-Karr married Edith Eliza Pilkington (1860–1884), daughter of William Roby Pilkington and Elizabeth Lee Watson of Roby Hall, Liverpool. They had three children: George Bernard (born 12 September 1881), Malcolm Henry (born 21 October 1882) and Edith Muriel (born 1884). Both George and Edith Muriel died in their teens. After the death of his wife in 1884, he remarried in 1886 to Jane Jarvie Thorburn (1862–1953). They had two children: Helen Mary (born 6 October 1888) and Kenneth William (born 21 March 1897).

At Grange Park Golf Club, St Helens an annual competition is still played in the name of Seton-Karr. This is the most prestigious competition in the clubs calendar.

Seton-Karr died in the sinking of the RMS Empress of Ireland on the Saint Lawrence River, the worst maritime disaster in Canadian history; he was returning to England from a hunting trip in British Columbia. He was interred at the Mount Hermon Cemetery, Sillery.

== Publications ==
- My Sporting Holidays (1904)
- Chapter in Early American Big Game Hunting (1905)

Parliament of the United Kingdom
New constituency	Member of Parliament for St Helens; 1885 – 1906	Succeeded by Thomas Glover
