= Lancashire and Cheshire Miners' Permanent Relief Society =

British friendly society

The Lancashire and Cheshire Miners Permanent Relief Society (LCMPRS) was a form of friendly society started in 1872 to provide financial assistance to miners who were unable to work after being injured in industrial accidents in collieries on the Lancashire Coalfield. It also provided funds for widows, orphans and dependent relatives of those who were killed in the pits. The society operated until 2006 from offices in Wigan.

== Background ==
In the 19th century there was no welfare system to support miners who were injured at work. The coal owners paid no compensation or sick pay and families could be left destitute. Large mining disasters attracted public subscriptions for the victims, their wives and dependants but nothing was forthcoming for the numerous single deaths that occurred regularly. To provide support for themselves and their families when they were unable to work, miners joined the friendly societies or permanent relief societies that were formed in Northumberland and Durham in 1862, North Staffordshire in 1869, Lancashire and Cheshire in 1872 and The West Riding of Yorkshire in 1877. Members of the society paid a weekly subscription of between two and four pence and when they were unable to work were paid up to ten shillings per week. Funeral grants, widow's pensions and orphan's benefits were also paid when its members were killed at work.

== Society ==
A spate of disasters in the late-1860s and early-1870s left authorities unable to cope with large numbers of widows and orphans whose main breadwinner had been killed in the pits. The Lancashire and Cheshire Miners Permanent Relief Society, championed by the Wigan miners' agent, William Pickard, was started in 1872 when Lancashire was the country's seventh largest coal producer and often had the highest accident figures. Pickard considered that colliery disasters turned people into paupers through no fault of their own and that the society should be funded by both the colliers and the coal owners, provide orphanages and campaign for more stringent safety rules. Many miners were sceptical and thought that colliery owners would have the advantage and when incidents occurred accidents would be paid for by the miners themselves releasing them from the incentive to work the pits safely. The idea was received more sympathetically by the coal owners whose funds were inadequate to meet the demands of the time. After William Pickard's death in 1887, Robert Isherwood became vice-president of the society.

By 1879, 27,000 miners were members of the society and 5,000 of them had drawn benefits. By 1900 about two-thirds of the coalfield's 80,000 miners had joined and were eligible for benefits.
