= Edwin Hall (disambiguation) =

Edwin Hall (1855–1938) was an American physicist.

Edwin Hall may also refer to:

- Edwin Oscar Hall (1810–1883), American businessman and politician in the Kingdom of Hawaii
- Edwin Thomas Hall (1851–1923), British architect
- Edwin Cuthbert Hall (1874–1953), Australian physician and philanthropist
- Edwin Hall (trade unionist) (1895–1961), British trade union leader
- Edwin Arthur Hall (1909–2004), American politician
- Edwin R. Hall, a man convicted for the murder of Kelsey Smith in 2007
