= Richard Austin Spencer =

British politician

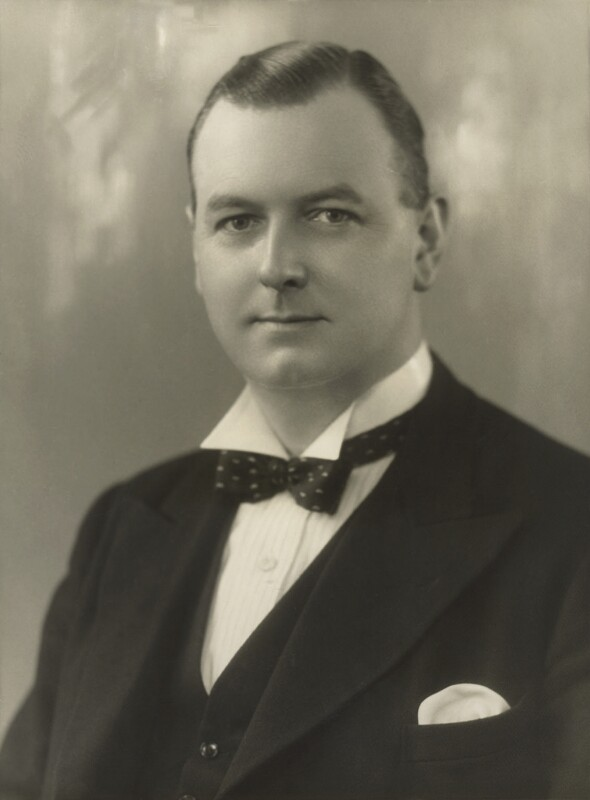
Spencer in 1932

Richard Austin Spencer (8 August 1892 – 8 December 1956) was Conservative MP for St Helens.

Educated at the Salford Grammar School and Borough Road College, London, Spencer took a first-class honours BA and MA in Modern Languages from the University of London. During the First World War, he joined the Manchester Regiment, before transferring to the Royal Air Force, reaching the rank of captain, and was mentioned in despatches. After the war, he turned to teaching, becoming senior lecturer in English at Manchester Training College, then taught French at Manchester Central High School.

Interested in local government, Spencer was elected chairman of the Hale Urban District Council. He contested St Helens in the 1929 general election, won the seat from Labour in the National Government landslide in 1931, but lost it back to them in 1935.

He was called to the bar by Gray's Inn in 1937 and was Secretary of the Royal Society of Teachers from 1936 to 1953. He also published several French textbooks.

Parliament of the United Kingdom
Preceded by James Sexton	Member of Parliament for St Helens; 1931 – 1935	Succeeded by William Albert Robinson
