= Gertrude Crawford =

Commandant of Women's Royal Air Force

Lady Gertrude Eleanor Crawford
- Born: Gertrude Eleanor Molyneux; 1 July 1868; London
- Died: 5 November 1937 (aged 69); Lymington, Hampshire
- Occupation: Commandant of the Women's Royal Air Force

Lady Gertrude Eleanor Crawford (née Molyneux) (1 July 1868 - 5 November 1937) was a British munitions worker and from April to May 1918 the first Commandant of the new Women's Royal Air Force. She was also one of the directors of The Stainless Steel and Non-Corrosive Metals Company Limited, formed by Cleone Benest.

== Family ==
She was the eldest daughter and second child of William Molyneux, 4th Earl of Sefton and Cecil Emily Jolliffe (1838–1899), the fifth daughter of William Jolliffe, 1st Baron Hylton.

On 25 April 1905 she married John Halket Crawford (1868-1936), who rose to be a Major in the 32nd Lancers, Indian Army.

== Life ==
On 26 April she was admitted to the freedom of the Turners' Company and in 1909 she built a goathouse for Lady Arthur Cecil. From 1914 onwards she worked at a munitions factory at Erith.

Crawford was also a Director of The Stainless Steel and Non-Corrosive Metals Company Limited, set up in Birmingham in 1922 by Cleone Benest, at that time using the name C Griff. Other directors of the company included Gabrielle Borthwick and C. Davis, a former foundry manager. The firm received wide press coverage for being managed by and employing women. Using Benest's colouring method, the company manufactured lamp reflectors, ornaments, railway fittings and other items, before it folded in 1925.

Crawford was a turner of wood and ivory. She was a member of the Red Rose Guild.

== Death ==
Lady Crawford died on 5 September 1937 in Lymington, Hampshire. She was pre-deceased her husband John Halket Crawford, who died just less than a year earlier on 23 September 1936.

== Legacy ==
The History of Science Museum in Oxford hold a collection of turned ivory and other objects made by Lady Crawford. The Worshipful Company of Turners offer an annual prize in her name, the Lady Gertrude Crawford Competition, one of three prizes "in honour of three great exponents and patrons of ornamental turning"

Military offices
| New office | Commandant of the Women's Royal Air Force; April–May 1918 | Succeeded by Violet Douglas-Pennant |
