= John McGurk =

British coal miner and trade unionist

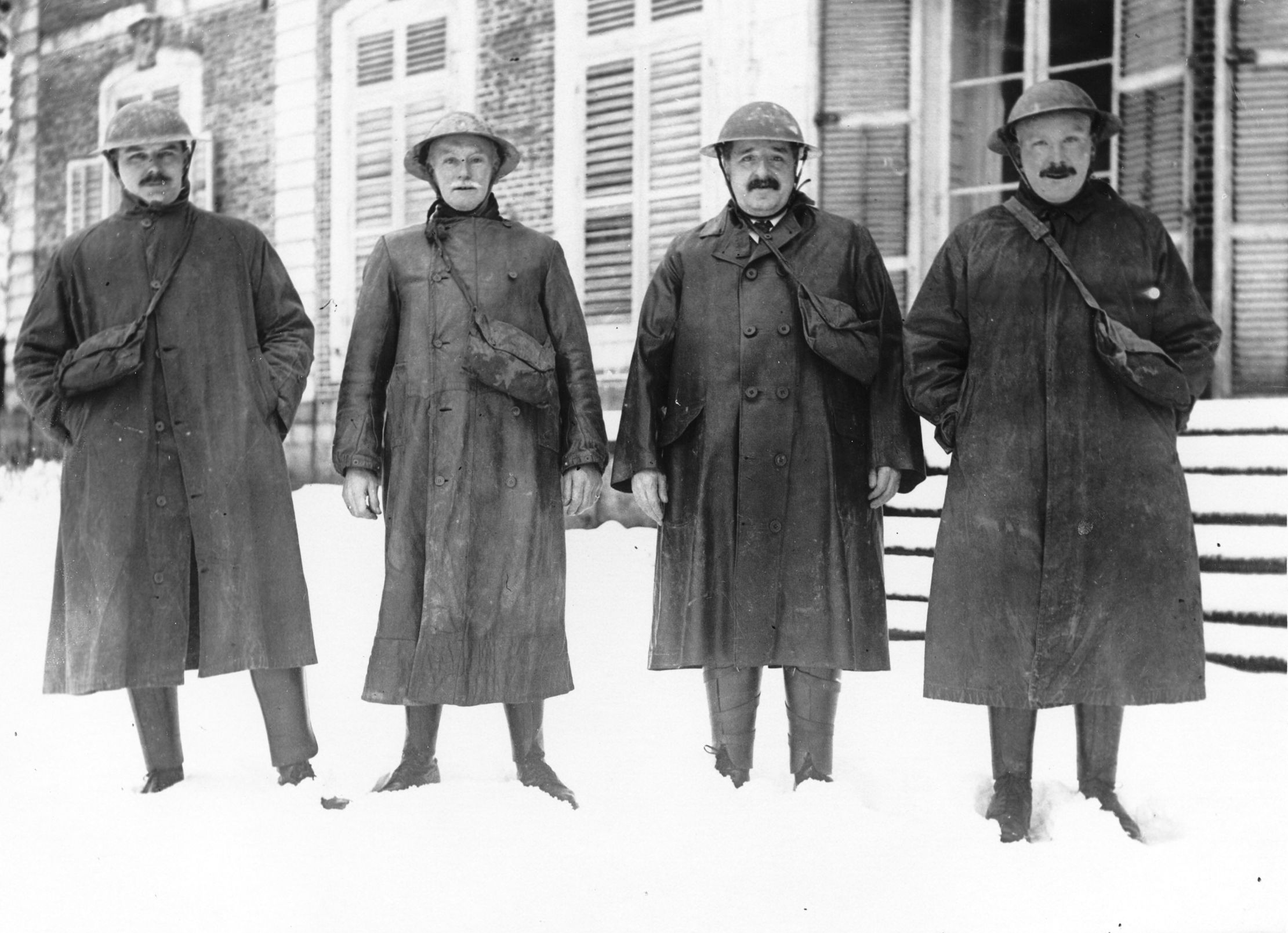
John McGurk, on right, with Henry Roughley, Thomas Greenall and Henry Twist visiting the Western Front in the First World War, believed to be to discuss mining under enemy lines

John McGurk (17 September 1874 – 22 November 1944) was a British coal miner and trade unionist.

Born in Barnsley, West Riding of Yorkshire, McGurk grew up in Pendlebury, Lancashire, and began working at a coal mine aged 12. He became active in the Lancashire and Cheshire Miners' Federation (LCMF), and in 1908 was elected as the agent for its north-eastern area.

McGurk was also active in the Labour Party. He stood unsuccessfully in Darwen at the 1918 general election and again in 1922, and was elected to its National Executive Committee, serving as Chair of the Labour Party in 1918/19. He was also elected to Bury Town Council.

Although McGurk talked down the LCMF's chances of victory in their 1921 lock-out, he fully backed the 1926 general strike. In 1929, he was elected as President of the union, serving until shortly before his death in 1944. He also spent some time as a member of the General Council of the Trades Union Congress.

Party political offices
Preceded by W. F. Purdy	Chair of the Labour Party; 1918–1919	Succeeded by William Harold Hutchinson
Trade union offices
Preceded by Thomas Greenall	President of the Lancashire and Cheshire Miners' Federation; 1929–1944	Succeeded by Edwin Hall
