= Thomas Aspinwall (trade unionist) =

British trade unionist

Thomas Aspinwall (29 May 1846 – 21 March 1901) was a British trade unionist.

Born in Bickerstaffe in Lancashire, Aspinwall moved with his family to Skelmersdale in 1860, and he began working at a local coal mine. He was elected as the checkweighman in 1873, and alongside this also began working as a shopkeeper.

In 1879, Aspinwall was elected as the General Secretary of the Ashton-under-Lyne Miners' Association, and he immediately convened a meeting of all the miners' unions in the county. This led to a series of conferences which ultimately founded the Lancashire and Cheshire Miners' Federation, Aspinwall being elected as its first President. This was somewhat controversial, with a minority of members arguing that only full-time working miners should hold union posts.

A major strike in 1880 led to Aspinwall losing his job as checkweighman; although it was an elected post, it could only be held by workers employed by a colliery. However, Aspinwall soon found a new post as agent for the Skelmersdale District Miners' Association, from 1887 combining this with the post of agent for the Wigan, Pemberton, Standish, Aspull and Blackrod Miners' Union.

Aspinwall supported the formation of the Miners' Federation of Great Britain in 1889, and served as the Lancashire representative on its executive committee for the first few years. He became a well-known figure, addressing an international miners' conference in Paris in 1891, and standing unsuccessfully as a Liberal-Labour candidate for Wigan at the 1892 general election. Although he did not win, he was only 110 votes away from taking the seat, and so the miners and Wigan Trades Council both asked him to stand again at the 1895 general election. The West Lancashire Liberal Party instead hoped to stand W. Woods, owner of a local colliery, but Prime Minister Lord Rosebery backed Aspinwall. Woods withdrew his candidacy, leaving the way open for Aspinwall to stand, but the West Lancashire Liberals still voted not to support the candidacy of a worker. Ultimately, Aspinwall lost the election by a wider margin of nearly 900 votes.

Aspinwall devoted much of his spare time to religion, and to temperance campaigning. He was also vice-president of the board of the Royal Albert Edward Infirmary.

Trade union offices
Preceded by New position	President of the Lancashire and Cheshire Miners' Federation; 1881 – c.1890	Succeeded by Sam Woods
