= David Thomas Gwynne-Vaughan =

Welsh botanist and academic

David Thomas Gwynne-Vaughan FRSE FLS MRIA (12 March 1871 – 4 September 1915) was a Welsh botanist and academic who specialised in ferns. He was associated with Queen Margaret College, Birkbeck College, Queen's College, Belfast, and Reading University.

== Early life ==
Gwynne-Vaughan was born on 12 March 1871 at Royston House in Llandovery, Caernarvonshire, Wales. He was the eldest son of Henry Thomas Gwynne-Vaughan of Cynghordy and Elizabeth Thomas. His mother died in 1874.

He was educated at Monmouth School, graduating in 1882. He studied natural sciences at Christ's College, Cambridge, graduating with a first class for part I of the natural sciences tripos in 1893. He did not continue with part II of his studies at Cambridge and, instead, taught science for a year.

== Career ==
In 1894, Gwynne-Vaughan worked with D. H. Scott at the Jodrell Laboratory in Kew. While there, he began to specialize in the microscopic study of plants. He then traveled overseas to exotic locations with a group of young British academics and adventurers, among them his second-cousin Gwynneth de Candia Vaughan. Gwynne-Vaughan spent 1895 in Amazonian rubber plantations. Along these overseas trips, he acquired extensive botanical data and regional information that eventually became vital to write the research papers that granted him a successful academic career.

In 1896, Gwynne-Vaughan presented "The Arrangement of the Vascular Bundles in Certain Nymphaeaceae" at the meeting of the British Association for the Advancement of Science. After hearing this presentation Frederick Bower asked Gwynne-Vaughan to join his team in Glasgow. After accepting the position, Gwynne-Vaughan was an assistant lecturer in botany at Queen Margaret College, studied the anatomy of Pteridophyta, and helped Bower write a book on practical botany.

In the summer of 1897, Gwynne-Vaughan took a study trip to Siam and Malaysia with W. W. Skeat. He became the head of the Botany Department at Birkbeck College in London in 1907. In 1909, he accepted a botany professorship at Queen's College, Belfast. In 1915, Gwynne-Vaughan became chair of the botany department at Reading University in Reading, Berkshire, but died in September of that year.

During his career, Gwynne-Vaughan published many papers on ferns.

== Honors ==
From 1906 to 1908, Gwynne-Vaughan won the Royal Society of Edinburgh Makdougall-Brisbane Prize. In 1907, he became a fellow of the Linnean Society of London . On 21 February 1910, he was elected a fellow of the Royal Society of Edinburgh. His proposers were Frederick Orpen Bower, Isaac Bayley Balfour, Robert Kidston and John Horne. He was also became a member of the Royal Irish Academy in 1912.

== Personal life ==
In 1911, Gwynne-Vaughan married Helen Gwynne-Vaughan, a mycologist and botanist at Birkbeck College. They had no children.

Gwynne-Vaughan died in Reading, England of tuberculosis on 4 September 1915.

== Select publications ==
- The Anatomy of Pteridophyta
- Observations on the Anatomy of Solenostelic Ferns (1901)
- On the Fossil Osmundacae (1907)

The standard author abbreviation Gwynne-Vaughan is used to indicate this person as the author when citing a botanical name.
