= Joe Gormley, Baron Gormley =

English trade unionist (1917–1993)

Joseph Gormley, Baron Gormley, OBE (5 July 1917 – 27 May 1993) was an English trade unionist. He was President of the National Union of Mineworkers (NUM) from 1971 to 1982 and later a Labour peer. He was appointed an OBE in the 1970 New Year's Honours.

== Early life ==
Gormley was born in Ashton-in-Makerfield, Lancashire, in 1917, one of seven children. His father, John Gormley, was a surfaceman at the Langtree Colliery in Standish. He became a miner at the age of fourteen. He was an active trade union official and became a committee member of the St Helens area branch of the NUM in 1957. He served as general secretary of the North West region from April 1961 and joined the national executive in 1963. He was a fan of Wigan rugby league football club.

== 1970s ==
In 1971, he was elected as leader of the NUM and presided over the national strike that began on 9 January 1972 and lasted for seven weeks. Following negotiations the strike was resolved on 25 February 1972 with a 21% increase in pay and concessions won by the miners that moved them to the top of the UK's industrial wage league.

On 12 November 1973 the miners began an overtime ban in response to the Conservative government's incomes policy. Combined with the shortages caused by the Middle East oil crisis, Britain faced widespread power cuts. Emergency measures were used to economise on electricity with the introduction of the Three-Day Week. On 20 December Gormley attended negotiations with Willie Whitelaw, Secretary of State for Employment, and was forced to shelter in an Italian restaurant due to an IRA bomb scare. On 23 January 1974 the NUM executive met and agreed to hold a pithead ballot for an all-out strike, with Gormley observing: "With fuel stocks holding out and spring around the corner our final card has to be played now or never". On 4 February the NUM announced that the miners had voted for an all-out strike.

The prime minister, Edward Heath, called a snap election on this issue. He asked the public, "Who governs Britain?" Gormley tried to persuade the National Executive Conference to postpone the strike until after any election, but it went ahead.

== 1980s ==
In 1981, prime minister, Margaret Thatcher, threatened to break with the 'Plan for Coal' and to close 23 pits. A ballot seeking strike action should the government close pits contrary to the Plan for Coal was held and returned a 87.6% majority in favour; Thatcher backed down. While many miners went on unofficial strike in the year, Gormley rejected calls for a national strike. He left his post in 1982 and was replaced by the more left-wing Arthur Scargill. In 1982, his last-minute appeal got miners to accept a government offer of a 9.3% raise, rejecting Scargill's call for a strike authorisation. When asked what he had achieved during his period as President, he replied: "Everyone wants to be related to a miner".

He was made a life peer as Baron Gormley of Ashton-in-Makerfield in Greater Manchester in the 1982 Birthday Honours.

Gormley was the subject of This Is Your Life in 1982 when he was surprised by Eamonn Andrews on his way to a meeting in Victoria, London.

== Special Branch ==
In 2002, the BBC stated that Gormley had passed on information to Special Branch about extremism within his union. A former Special Branch officer made this allegation and said that Gormley "loved his country. He was a patriot and he was very wary and worried about the growth of militancy within his own union".

== Autobiography ==
- Joe Gormley (1982). Battered Cherub. Hamilton. ISBN 0-241-10754-7.

Trade union offices
Preceded by Edwin Hall	Secretary of the Lancashire Area of the National Union of Mineworkers; 1961–1971	Succeeded by Sid Vincent
Preceded by Sidney Ford	President of the National Union of Mineworkers; 1971–1982	Succeeded by Arthur Scargill
