= Rigby Swift =

British barrister (1874–1937)

Sir Rigby Swift
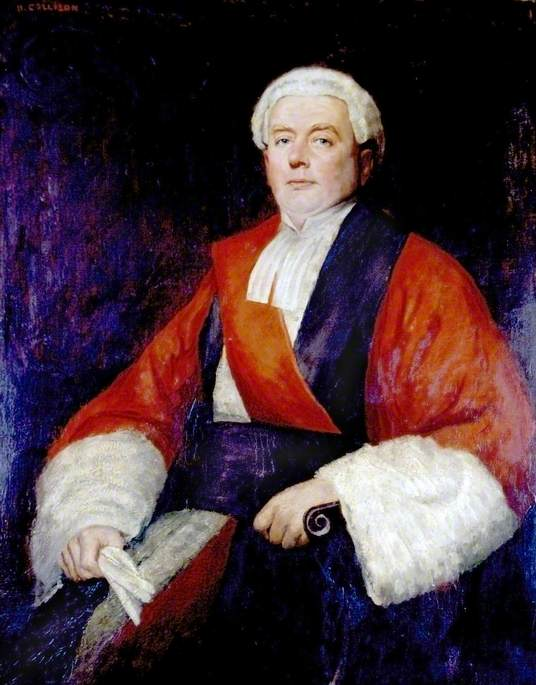

High Court of Justice
- In office 21 June 1920 – 19 October 1937

Personal details
- Born: 7 June 1874
- Died: 19 October 1937 (aged 63)
- Party: Conservative
- Profession: Barrister, Judge

Sir Rigby Philip Watson Swift (7 June 1874 – 19 October 1937) was a British barrister, Member of Parliament and judge. Born into a legal family, Swift was educated at Parkfield School before taking up a place in his father's chambers and at the same time studying for his LLB at the University of London. After completing his degree in January 1895 he was called to the Bar at Lincoln's Inn on 26 June. He took up a place in his father's chambers, and his work steadily increased. After the death of his father on 26 September 1899 he took over the chambers, and by 1904 he was earning 3,000 guineas a year.

In 1910 he became the Conservative Member of Parliament for St Helens. He moved to London in 1911, and was made a King's Counsel in 1912. His work continued to increase, and by 1916 he was earning 10,000 guineas a year. In the same year he became Recorder of Wigan and a Bencher of Lincoln's Inn. In 1917 he defended Frederick Handel Booth in Gruban v Booth, and in 1918 he represented the Air Ministry in front of the Select Committee of the House of Lords on the Women's Royal Air Force.

On 21 June 1920 he was made a judge of the High Court of Justice by the Lord Chancellor Lord Birkenhead, and became the youngest High Court judge at the time. In 1921 he heard the "Sinn Féin case", an application of the controversial Treason Felony Act 1848, and his decision in Nunan v Southern Railway Company [1923] 2 K.B. 703 was an important one in relation to exclusion clauses and liability, and was referenced by Lord Hanworth in the later case Thompson v LMS Railway. Swift died on 19 October 1937 while still a High Court judge, and was buried in Rotherfield.

== Early life and education ==
Swift was born on 7 June 1874 at Hardshaw Hall, Lancashire to Thomas Swift and his second wife Emily. The male members of the family were mostly lawyers - Thomas Swift was a solicitor, three of his sons also became solicitors, his brother was a registrar and his cousin, Sir John Rigby was a barrister and later judge. After John Rigby became a King's Counsel in 1880, Thomas Swift switched paths and became a barrister. He specialised in criminal work, and served as counsel in the trial of Florence Maybrick. His career change had a great impact on the family - they moved from Lancashire to Liverpool (where Thomas Swift's chambers were) and Rigby Swift was undoubtedly influenced by his father's career when it came to choosing one of his own.

After some time spent with a governess, Swift began formal education at the age of 10 when he attended a small preparatory school. The school was not a good one - Swift later wrote that "I was immoderately bullied... during the whole time I was there I think I learnt nothing." In May 1886 he moved to Parkfield School, where he became head boy and held a "kindly, easy authority". In 1892 he began studying to become a barrister in a way completely unique - by working at his father's set of chambers from the age of 17. Standard practice was for a student to do a law degree and study the legal theory, before moving to a set of chambers as a pupil to learn the practical application of the law. Swift instead studied both simultaneously, and became noticed by the solicitors of Liverpool before he was even called to the Bar. At this time he became a friend of Arthur Greer, later Baron Fairfield.

As well as the practical work in his father's chambers, Swift also studied at the University of London, gaining an LLB in January 1895 before he was 21, and frequently spoke at the Liverpool Law Students Society, where he debated with Henry McCardie. On 26 June 1895 he was called to the Bar at Lincoln's Inn by Joseph Chitty, and became qualified to practice as a barrister.

== At the Bar ==
Swift's first proper case took place in November 1895 at the High Court in front of Mr Justice Cave - a case he won, although he felt that he had worked "horribly". His work increased over the next two years, and in 1897 he acted as a junior for John Bigham QC, later a High Court judge. Swift would occasionally appear in court against his father, and the two were noted for deliberately baiting each other. By 1899 he was earning 462 guineas in a year, over twelve times what he was earning when he was first called to the Bar. His first murder case was in 1899, and although he lost he was commended by the judge (Mr Justice Wills) for the "great taste and propriety" of his final argument.

On 26 September 1899 his father, Thomas Swift, fell ill on the way home from chambers and died on the bus. With Thomas Swift dead, Rigby Swift had to decide what to do with his father's chambers. Although it would cause significant financial hardship for Swift and his clerk, he decided to run the chambers himself. This soon turned out to be a wise move - many of Thomas Swift's clients chose to stay on with Rigby, and in 1899 he defended the United Alkali Company from a lawsuit resulting from a large explosion at their chemical plant in St Helens. In the same year another two barristers joined the chambers, one of whom later became a High Court judge. By the end of 1900 Swift had earned over 1000 guineas. In 1902 he was earning 2,000 guineas a year, and by 1904 he was earning 3,000. By 1909 he was considered the most prestigious junior barrister (a barrister who isn't a Queen's Counsel) in Liverpool.

=== Politics and King's Counsel ===
In January 1910, Swift stoof for Parliamentp for St Helens on the Conservative Party ticket. The seat had previously been Conservative-held, but since 1906 had been controlled by the Labour Party with a safe majority of 1,411 votes. Swift campaigned hard, but despite his work and a "brilliant incursion" by F. E. Smith, Swift was defeated 6,512 votes to 5,717, leaving the sitting Labour member (Thomas Glover) with a majority of 795. Swift ran for the same seat again in the December election, the previous government having lasted only 11 months. The campaign was more hard-fought than the previous one, and was described as "one of the fiercest elections ever contested in a red-hot constituency". When the results were announced, Swift had won with 6,016 votes to Glover's 5,752, a narrow majority of 264.

Now that he was a Member of Parliament, Swift applied to become a King's Counsel (KC). The Lord Chancellor (Lord Loreburn) rejected his application because of the custom that a prospective KC should first open a practice in London. In 1911 he moved to London, something which initially cut into his income as solicitors were not aware of him. When the new Lord Chancellor Lord Haldane promoted a new set of KCs in 1912, Swift was among them. From this point onwards his share of cases began to improve.

In 1913 he defended Cecil Chesterton in the libel trial over his coverage of the Marconi scandal, along with Ernest Wild KC. In opposition was "as formidable a team as ever conducted a prosecution" – Edward Carson, later Baron Carson, F. E. Smith, later the Earl of Birkenhead, and Richard Muir. The allegations by Chesterton were so extreme that a criminal libel case was launched. Chesterton lost, but the case brought Swift's name to the attention of London solicitors.

In 1916 he became Recorder of Wigan. The same year he was made a Bencher of Lincoln's Inn, and by this point was earning 10,000 guineas a year. He disliked going out of London, and doubled his fees to a minimum of 200 guineas for cases outside London. Despite this the more money he charged, the more cases he got. He also followed a rule that meant he would only deal with one case at a time - again this failed to cut down the number of solicitors looking to employ him, because they appreciated a barrister who would dedicate all his working hours to their particular case. In 1917 he defended Frederick Handel Booth in Gruban v Booth, and in 1918 he represented the Air Ministry in front of the Select Committee of the House of Lords on the Women's Royal Air Force.

== Judge ==
In June 1920 he received an invitation from Lord Birkenhead, the Lord Chancellor, to become a judge of the High Court. He was formally appointed on 21 June, along with Edward Acton, and was knighted on 12 August. When appointed he was 46, and was the youngest High Court judge at that time. His appointment was considered a good one by the press; The Times wrote that "no appointment could be met with greater approval - we might even say enthusiasm - in the legal profession and among the public than that of Mr. Rigby Swift", while the Daily Mail wrote that "Mr. Rigby Swift has long been marked out for judgeship". After 1934 he occasionally sat as an additional judge in the Court of Appeal of England and Wales.

In 1934 in court during a libel action brought by Aleister Crowley (after a statement that Crowley practised black magic), black and white magic were solemnly discussed in court before Mr Justice Swift. The plaintiff said that he had founded a community in Sicily for the purpose of studying white magic.

=== Sinn Féin case ===
In 1921 Swift heard a case (known at the time as the Sinn Féin case) in which the controversial Treason Felony Act 1848 was applied. From 1920 to 1921 Manchester had been targeted by IRA forces who mounted an incendiary campaign against the city, setting fire to over 40 buildings between November 1920 and April 1921. On 2 April the police raided the local IRA headquarters, and in the ensuing fight one IRA member was killed and another wounded. A further nineteen were captured, and they went on trial at the next Assize Court. They were charged under the Treason Felony Act based on their membership of the IRA and of Sinn Féin. This was the first time that anyone had been charged simply for being a member of Sinn Féin, and was seen by the British government as a landmark case, with the Attorney General Sir Gordon Hewart acting as the prosecution.

The trial began on 4 July and lasted for six days. The proceedings were heavily guarded - Swift was escorted into court by armed police, the court itself was surrounded by armed patrols and the public were not allowed to watch the proceedings. Witnesses were brought over from Ireland under armed guard and given complete anonymity. The argument of the defence was a weak one, and was not accepted by the defendants themselves, who argued that they were prisoners of war and that their actions were therefore not covered by normal criminal law. Neither Swift or the jury were convinced, however, and after being found guilty the men were sentenced to between three and fifteen years of penal servitude.

A case of Swift's with important implications for the common law was Nunan v Southern Railway Company [1923] 2 K.B. 703. Nunan was a workman who was killed in an accident caused by the negligence of railway employees. Under the Fatal Accidents Act his widow could claim compensation from the railway company, but the case was complicated because of an exclusion clause on the ticket he was using which limited the company's liability to £100. The widow argued that the exclusion clause was only binding on her husband when he was alive, and that it did not affect parliamentary statute such as the Fatal Accidents Act.

Swift decided that while the ticket bound Nunan, his widow was right in saying that the clause did not affect parliamentary statute, and he awarded her £800. His judgment played an important part in and was referenced in the later decision of Lord Hanworth in Thompson v LMS Railway.

=== Divorce ===
During the 1920s the Divorce Court was massively backlogged, with even the Lord Chancellor, Lord Birkenhead, helping deal with cases. Despite this the backlog continued to grow, and in 1920 Swift was seconded to the Divorce Court to deal with cases. Many of them were deliberately arranged divorces, with one party sending the other a letter reading along the lines of "Please divorce me. Here is a bill from - Hotel, I was there with a man who wishes to throw his lot in with mine". In 1925 Swift was again seconded to the Divorce Court, and began to get frustrated with the arranged divorces. On 22 April, while hearing a case, he exclaimed that the arranged divorces were "a perfect farce", included elements of collusion and that he had half a mind to send the cases to the Director of Public Prosecutions. His comments were widely reported by the press, and he apologised the next day, saying that he was simply disgusted by a system in which one party had to pretend to commit adultery to get a divorce.

=== Frederick Nodder ===
Shortly before his death, in March 1937 Swift presided at the trial at Warwick Winter Assizes of Frederick Nodder, who was charged with abducting Mona Tinsley, aged 10, who had not been seen since leaving school on 5 January 1937. His conduct of the trial was marked by bad-tempered interruption, sarcastic comments (chiefly directed at defence counsel Maurice Healy), and unjustified complaints that documents had been withheld. When the jury convicted, Swift in passing sentence referred to the continued mystery about Mona Tinsley's fate: "What you did with that little girl, what became of her, only you know. It may be that time will reveal the dreadful secret which you carry in your breast." Three months later Mona Tinsley's body was recovered from a nearby river, and Nodder was subsequently convicted of murder and hanged.

== Death ==
On 15 April 1937 his wife, Lady Swift, had a large heart attack. She survived for four days before dying on 19 April. Swift returned to work and his life continued, but it was "continuation from mere momentum" rather than any desire to live. On 15 October he had a heart attack, and on 19 October, exactly six months after his wife's death, he died at home and was buried in a graveyard in Rotherfield.

== In popular culture ==
Swift was portrayed by John Horsley in Series 1, Episode 1 of the 1980 Granada Television series Lady Killers.

== Bibliography ==
- Fay, E.S. (1938). The Life of Mr Justice Swift. Methuen & Co Ltd. OCLC 5018299.
- Hyde, H Montgomery (1960). Sir Patrick Hastings, his life and cases. London: Heinemann. OCLC 498180.
- Pritchard, Frederick Eills (1968). Rigby: The Honourable Mr Justice Swift Remembered. London: W & J Mackay & Co Ltd.
- Hole, Christina (1940). English Folklore. London: B.T.Batsford Ltd.

Parliament of the United Kingdom
Preceded by Thomas Glover	Member of Parliament for St Helens; December 1910 – 1918	Succeeded by James Sexton
