= Wigan Miners' Association =

Coal miners association in Lancashire

The Wigan Miners' Association represented coal miners in parts of Lancashire, in England.

The union was established in 1862, as the Wigan Miners' Provident Benefit Society. During the 1860s, it was one of the strongest miners' unions in the UK. It joined the National Association of Coal, Lime and Ironstone Workers in 1863, and then in 1869, it joined the Amalgamated Association of Miners. It was led by William Pickard.

In the 1870s, the union suffered a large number of splits: the Skelmersdale District Miners' Association, and the Tyldesley Miners' Association in 1874, and then the Aspull and District Miners' Association, Blackrod Miners' Association, Hindley Miners' Improvement Benefit Society, Leigh and District Miners' Association, Platt Bridge Miners' and Checkweigh Association, and Standish District Miners' Association in 1877. It was a founding affiliate of the Lancashire and Cheshire Miners' Federation (LCMF) in 1881, by which point its membership was down to 2,000. It dissolved itself into the LCMF in 1908.
