= Ministry of Agriculture and Fisheries =

The Ministry of Agriculture and Fisheries may refer to one of several national organisations:

- Danish Ministry of Food, Agriculture and Fisheries, formerly the Ministry of Agriculture and Fishing
- Ministry of Agriculture (France)
- Ministry of Fisheries and Agriculture (Iceland)
- Ministry of Agriculture and Fisheries (Jamaica)
- Ministry of Agriculture, Forestry and Fisheries (Japan)
- Ministry of Agriculture, Nature and Food Quality (Netherlands)
- Ministry for Primary Industries (New Zealand), formed in 2011 by the merger of the Ministry of Agriculture and Forestry and the Ministry of Fisheries
- Department of Agriculture, Forestry and Fisheries (South Africa)
- Ministry of Agriculture and Fisheries (United Kingdom), later the Ministry of Agriculture, Fisheries and Food

== See also ==
- Ministry of Agriculture
