= Women's Royal Air Force (World War I) =

Women's military formation of the United Kingdom (1918-1920)

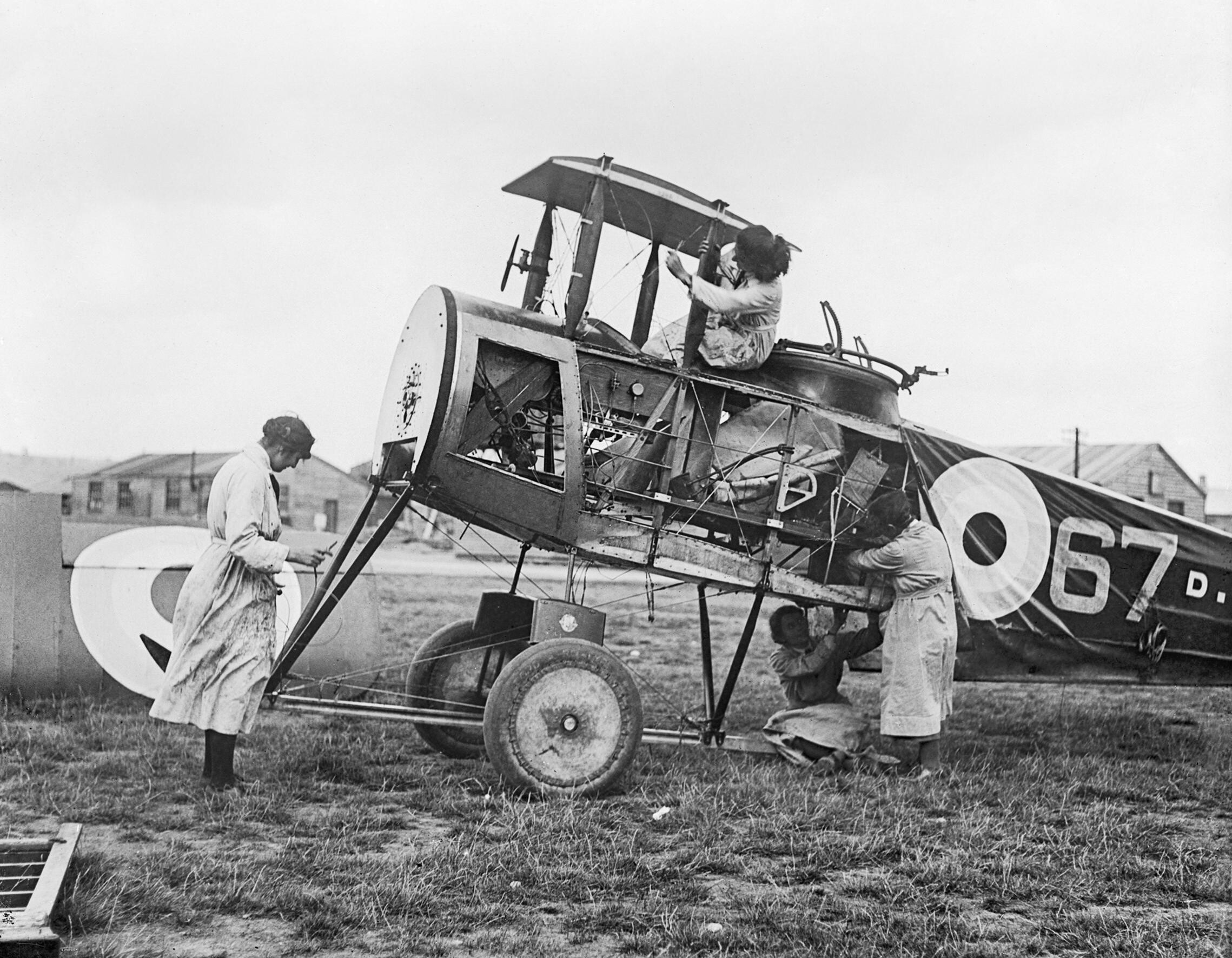
Air Mechanics of the Women's Royal Air Force (WRAF) working on the fuselage of an Avro 504 aircraft, 1918

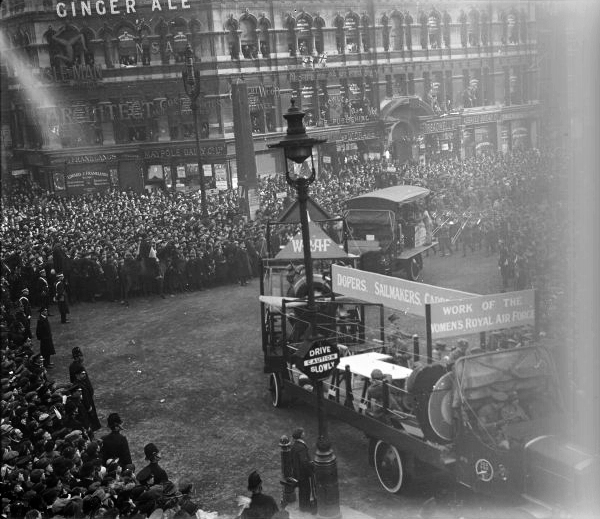
The WRAF on parade in London at the end of World War I, 1918

The Women's Royal Air Force (WRAF) was the women's branch of the Royal Air Force, existing from 1 April 1918 until 1 April 1920, when it was disbanded. Its original intent was to provide female mechanics in order to free up men for front line service in World War I. However, the organisation saw high enrolment, with women also serving in a number of other non-combatant roles, including drivers, caterers, clerks and tailors, as well as filling other wartime needs.

Its last veteran was for a time thought to be Gladys Powers, who died in 2008, but Florence Green, who died in February 2012, was subsequently found to be the last-known surviving WRAF veteran.

The name was revived in 1949 for the regular women's branch of the RAF. The auxiliary organisation in the Second World War had been called the Women's Auxiliary Air Force.

== Strength ==
The target strength had been a force of around 90,000. Figures are unreliable until 1 August 1918, when the strength was 15,433, approximately 5,000 recruits and 10,000 transferred from the predecessor organisations, mainly the Queen Mary's Army Auxiliary Corps, but also the Women's Royal Naval Service. The organisation never exceeded 25,000.

== Depots ==
Depots were opened in 1918 at Handsworth College, in Glasgow, at RAF Flowerdown and at York.

== List of Commandants ==
- Gertrude Crawford, 1918
- Violet Douglas-Pennant, May–September 1918
- Helen Gwynne-Vaughan, September 1918 – 1920

== Notable members ==
- Muriel Thompson
