= Handel Booth =

British politician

Frederick Handel Booth (1867 – 24 February 1947) was a British politician, who served as a Liberal Member of Parliament (MP) for Pontefract from 1910 to 1918.

He was born near Manchester in 1867, and attended the high school in Bolton le Moors.

In the 1900 general election he unsuccessfully stood for the King's Lynn seat. In the December 1910 general election was elected as the MP for Pontefract in the West Riding of Yorkshire by 52 votes, being less than 2% of the votes cast.

Whilst in Parliament, he led the government inquiry into the Marconi scandal of 1912.

In 1917, he was found liable and guilty of fraud in the high-profile case of Gruban v Booth, having defrauded a German-born businessman of his company and had him interned. At the 1918 general election, his scandalous seizure of a company resulting in nearly £5000 of damages plus legal fees awarded against him, led to the party forcing him to contest the new firmly coal-mining-centric seat, several miles south, Wentworth, where he was defeated by the Labour candidate in what has proved by length of tenure that party's safest seat to the present date, if counting its main successor as a continuation. Handel Booth's previous seat, Pontefract, remained Liberal until the 1922 general election.

== Notes ==
Parliament of the United Kingdom
| Preceded by Sir Thomas Nussey | Member of Parliament for Pontefract; December 1910 – 1918 | Succeeded by Sir Joseph Compton-Rickett |
