= William Pickard =

British trade unionist

William Pickard (10 February 1821 – 21 October 1887) was a British trade unionist.

Born in Aspull Moor in Lancashire, Pickard worked at a colliery from an early age. He became active in the Wigan District Miners' Union and, despite being illiterate, he rose to prominence. He was elected as vice-president of Alexander Macdonald's Miners' National Association (MNA) at its founding conference in 1863, and as agent of the Wigan Miners' Association in 1864.

Pickard and Thomas Halliday became critical of Macdonald's cautious approach to trade unionism, and founded a new Amalgamated Association of Miners (AAM), with Pickard as treasurer. This new association advocated more militant action, including solidarity strikes, but continued to co-operate with the MNA, and even welcomed Macdonald to speak at its conferences. The AAM was initially successful, expanding across Great Britain and winning several strikes, which inspired Pickard to stand as a Liberal-Labour candidate in Wigan at the 1874 UK general election, taking fourth place of five candidates.

The AAM was suffering from financial difficulties and so, in 1875, merged back into the MNA. Pickard thereafter withdrew from national trade unionism, but remained agent of the Wigan miners and was prominent in leading rescue efforts and organising compensation after mining accidents. After an explosion in Pearson and Knowles' Moss Pits in which 69 men died, the exploring party including Pickard descended into the downcast shaft where several colliers were found alive and returned to the surface. The coal had caught fire and two more explosions occurred and no more could be done. It was decided that anyone left underground must be dead and the shaft was sealed. Pickard championed the formation of the Lancashire and Cheshire Miners' Permanent Relief Society in 1872 after a spate of disasters caused great distress and hardship, leaving widows and families destitute.

After Pickard's death, the Vicar of Ince related that he had been a witness at every House of Commons Committee from 1860 and given evidence at a Royal Commission. He was present in the aftermath of many of the mining disasters since 1858, only the senior inspector, Joseph Dickinson, had attended more, and frequently had been a member of the first exploring party that descended into the mines after explosions. He was delegated to attend inquiries after disasters in South Wales where he was held in great esteem.

Twenty thousand miners contributed to the memorial for Pickard in Wigan Cemetery.
