= Edwin Hall (trade unionist) =

British trade unionist

Edwin Hall (24 September 1895 – 9 July 1961), also known as Teddy Hall, was a British trade unionist.

Born at Hindley Green near Wigan, Hall began working at a colliery at the age of thirteen, joining the Lancashire and Cheshire Miners' Federation (LCMF). A few years later, he became secretary of his local miners' lodge, and was later elected as a checkweighman, and as the union's agent for the St Helen's area.

In 1942, Hall was elected as vice-president of the LCMF, and as its president in 1944. The following year, the union became the Lancashire Area of the National Union of Mineworkers, and Hall was elected as the area's general secretary.

Hall served on various national and international committees, and was a member of the General Council of the Trades Union Congress from 1954. He was also secretary of the Leigh and District Trades Council. Under union rules, he retired in 1960, on reaching the age of 65, and he died the following year.

Trade union offices
Preceded by John McGurk	President of the Lancashire and Cheshire Miners' Federation; 1944–1945	Succeeded by Laurence Plover
Preceded by Peter Pemberton	General Secretary of the Lancashire Area of the National Union of Mineworkers; 1945–1960	Succeeded by Joe Gormley
Preceded by Alfred Roberts	Trades Union Congress representative to the American Federation of Labour; 1953; With: Charles Geddes	Succeeded by Jim Baty and Jock Tiffin
