= Ashton-under-Lyne by-election =

Ashton-under-Lyne by-election may refer to one of five by-elections held in the British House of Commons constituency of Ashton-under-Lyne, in Lancashire:

- 1920 Ashton-under-Lyne by-election
- 1928 Ashton-under-Lyne by-election
- 1931 Ashton-under-Lyne by-election
- 1939 Ashton-under-Lyne by-election
- 1945 Ashton-under-Lyne by-election

== See also ==
- Ashton-under-Lyne (UK Parliament constituency)
