= 1916 Ashton-under-Lyne by-election =

UK parliamentary by-election

The 1916 Ashton-under-Lyne by-election was a by-election held on 23 December 1916 for the British House of Commons constituency of Ashton-under-Lyne.

== Summary ==
The Conservative Albert Stanley was the only candidate nominated and was therefore declared elected unopposed.

In exchange for his cession of the Conservative seat, the town's Conservative Party Member of Parliament (MP) Sir Max Aitken was elevated to the peerage as Baron Beaverbrook.

== See also ==
- List of United Kingdom by-elections
- Ashton-under-Lyne constituency
- 1920 Ashton-under-Lyne by-election
- 1928 Ashton-under-Lyne by-election
- 1931 Ashton-under-Lyne by-election
- 1939 Ashton-under-Lyne by-election
- 1945 Ashton-under-Lyne by-election
