= Albert Bellamy =

English trades unionist and Labour Party politician (1870–1931)

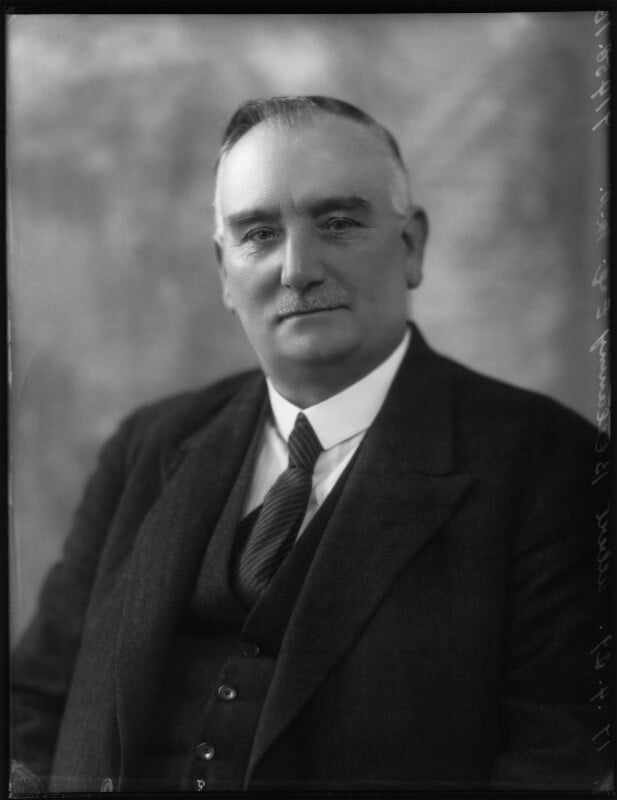
Bellamy in 1929

Albert Bellamy (1870 – 26 March 1931) was an English trades unionist and Labour Party politician.

Bellamy was born in Wigan, Lancashire and took up employment as an engine-driver for the London and North Western Railway. He became involved in trade union activities, rising to the presidency of the Amalgamated Society of Railway Servants. During the 1911 transport strike, he was prominent in leading the successful campaign for union recognition by the railway companies. When the ASRS was merged with two other rail unions in 1913 to form the National Union of Railwaymen, Bellamy was its first president, serving until 1917.

From 1917 to 1927 he was a member of the War Pensions Appeal Tribunal. He made his home at Stockport, Cheshire, where he was president of the local Trades Council and Labour Party, as well serving as a magistrate.

He stood unsuccessfully as a parliamentary candidate for the Labour Party at Wakefield at the 1918 and 1922 general elections. He eventually entered the Commons when he was elected Member of Parliament for Ashton-under-Lyne at a by-election in October 1928, after the sitting Conservative MP Cornelius Homan was disqualified when he was declared bankrupt.

Bellamy was re-elected at the 1929 general election. Following the election, the Second Labour Government was formed, and he was appointed parliamentary private secretary to F O Roberts, Minister of Pensions. Soon after entering government, Bellamy became ill and died, at Wandsworth, in March 1931, aged 60. The by-election for his seat was won by the Conservative candidate John Broadbent.

Parliament of the United Kingdom
Preceded by Cornelius Homan	Member of Parliament for Ashton-under-Lyne; 1928 – 1931	Succeeded by John Broadbent
Trade union offices
Preceded by Edward Charles	President of the Amalgamated Society of Railway Servants; 1911–1913	Succeeded by Union merged
Preceded by New position	President of the National Union of Railwaymen; 1913–1917	Succeeded by Charlie Cramp
