= George Williams (British politician) =

British army officer and Liberal politician

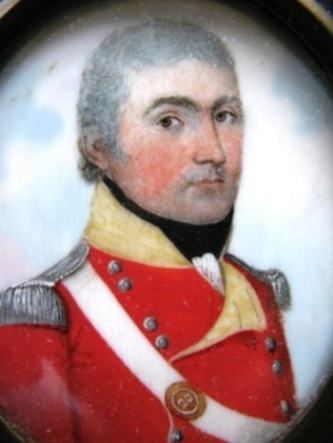
George Williams, miniature portrait c.1800

Lieutenant-Colonel George Williams (1765 – 19 December 1850) was a British army officer and Liberal politician.

== Background ==
Williams was born in St. John's, Newfoundland, of Welsh descent, grandson of George Williams of Silverdale near Swansea. His father George Williams the younger was one of three brothers, and was chief magistrate of Newfoundland in 1765; and Griffith Williams (died 1790), an army officer and author of An account of the island of Newfoundland, was his uncle. The third brother, John, was a merchant in St. John's. His mother, who married his father in 1762, was Mary or Marie Monier, from Jersey.

== Military career ==
Griffith Williams served under General John Burgoyne in the Saratoga Campaign in 1777, during the American Revolutionary War, and George Williams went with him and joined the army as a twelve-year-old volunteer. He was granted a commission as an ensign in the 62nd Regiment of Foot, replacing an officer mortally wounded at the Battle of Freeman's Farm. He was briefly a prisoner of war before returning with his regiment to England. He was promoted to lieutenant in 1782.

After studying at the Royal Military Academy, Woolwich, he exchanged his commission in the 62nd Foot with one in the 20th (East Devonshire) Regiment of Foot in 1785. The regiment spent two years in the West Indies, taking part in the Second Maroon War. Williams left the army in 1800 with the rank of major.

Williams retired to Little Woolton near Liverpool, having married Mrs James, a widow. With the threat of an invasion by French forces, he helped organise the merchants and tradesmen into a local defence unit, The Liverpool Volunteers. He became the commanding officer of the volunteers with the rank of lieutenant-colonel. In common with other such units, the Liverpool volunteers were disbanded at the Peace of Amiens in 1802.

== Political career ==
In retirement, Williams adopted the life of a country gentleman, and was appointed as a justice of the peace. He was an active member of the Liberal Party, and supported the election of William Roscoe as Member of Parliament for Liverpool in 1806. He stood unsuccessfully for Lancashire in 1820, backed by Peter Crompton and Ottiwell Wood.

Following the enactment of the Reform Act 1832, Williams was approached by the electors for the newly enfranchised parliamentary borough of Ashton-under-Lyne to stand as Liberal candidate. He accepted the nomination, and was elected as MP at the 1832 general election. He was defeated at the next election in 1835.

Colonel George Williams died at his Woolton home, aged 85.

== Family ==
Williams married in 1801, as her second husband, Elizabeth Ashton. She was a widow, having first married in 1787 William Evan James of Liverpool, and was mother with him of William James MP. His stepson James was in parliament from 1820, and became an ally of Williams and the Liverpool reformers.

Elizabeth was the daughter of Nicholas Ashton (1744–1833) of Woolton Hall and his wife Mary Warburton Philpot. Through her maternal grandfather John Philpot, she was heiress to the Hefferton Grange estate of the Warburton family.

George and Elizabeth had two daughters and two sons. Monier Williams (died 1823), younger brother to George, became Surveyor-General of Bombay, and was father of the orientalist Monier Williams.

== Notes ==
Parliament of the United Kingdom
| New constituency | Member of Parliament for Ashton-under-Lyne; 1832–1835 | Succeeded by Charles Hindley |
