= David Heyes =

British politician

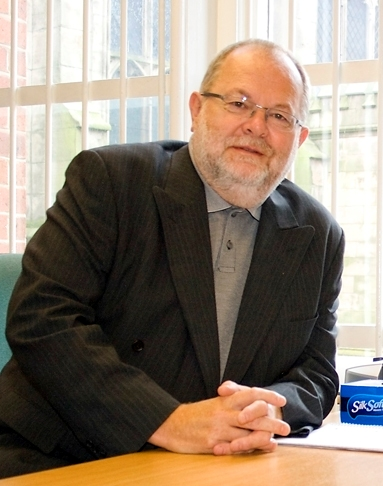
- Heyes in 2009.

Member of Parliament for Ashton-under-Lyne
- In office 7 June 2001 – 30 March 2015
- Preceded by: Robert Sheldon
- Succeeded by: Angela Rayner

Personal details
- Born: 2 April 1946 (age 80) Blackley, Lancashire, England
- Party: Labour
- Spouse: Judith Egerton-Gallagher
- Education: Open University
- Website: http://www.davidheyes.com

David Alan Heyes (born 2 April 1946) is a British Labour Party politician and former Member of Parliament (MP) for Ashton-under-Lyne from 2001 to 2015.

== Early life ==
Heyes was born in Blackley, Manchester, and was educated at the Blackley Technical High School on Dommett Street. He was awarded a BA in social sciences from the Open University in 1987. He joined Manchester City Council in 1962 as a local government officer, before joining Greater Manchester County Council in 1974. He was appointed as a principal local government officer with the Metropolitan Borough of Oldham Council in 1987, leaving local government employment in 1990 to set up as a graphic designer. In 1995 he was appointed deputy district manager of Manchester Citizens Advice Bureau where he remained until his election to parliament.

He has been a member of the trade union UNISON, and its predecessor the NALGO, since 1962. He was elected as a councillor in Oldham in 1992 and was secretary of the Labour group from 1993 to 2000; he stood down from the council in 2004.

== Parliamentary career ==
Following the retirement of Ashton's veteran Labour MP Robert Sheldon at the 2001 General Election, he represented the seat in the House of Commons until 2015.

He has served as a member of the public administration select committee since 2001 and has fought for compensation for residents living alongside the M60 motorway.

== Personal life ==
He is married to Judith Egerton-Gallagher, and they have a son and a daughter.

Parliament of the United Kingdom
Preceded by Robert Sheldon	Member of Parliament for Ashton under Lyne; 2001–2015	Succeeded by Angela Rayner
