= Hervey Rhodes, Baron Rhodes =

British Labour Party politician

The Right Honourable The Lord Rhodes KG, DFC*, PC, DL

Member of the House of Lords
- Lord Temporal
- as a life peer 14 September 1964 – 11 September 1987

Member of Parliament for Ashton-under-Lyne
- In office 2 October 1945 – 25 September 1964
- Preceded by: William Jowitt
- Succeeded by: Robert Sheldon

Personal details
- Born: Hervey Rhodes; 12 August 1895 Saddleworth, West Riding of Yorkshire, England
- Died: 11 September 1987 (aged 92) Oldham, Greater Manchester, England
- Party: Labour

Hervey Rhodes, Baron Rhodes (12 August 1895 – 11 September 1987), was a British Labour Party politician.

== Biography ==
Born in Saddleworth in the West Riding of Yorkshire, Rhodes was educated at St Mary's School, Greenfield, and Huddersfield Technical College. He was employed within the woollen industry.

During the First World War he served with the King's Own Royal Lancashire Regiment, and later with the Yorkshire Regiment. Seconded to the Royal Flying Corps, Rhodes served as an observer/gunner with No. 12 Squadron flying the RE 8. The squadron was mainly engaged on reconnaissance and artillery spotting duties, but Rhodes who normally flew with pilot South African Lt Croye Pithey, (Note: All but one of Rhodes' claims were with Pithey as pilot.) claimed a total of five enemy aircraft and two balloons destroyed and four more aircraft claimed 'out of control'. Pithey and Rhodes were the highest scoring RE 8 crew of the war. Rhodes won the Distinguished Flying Cross and Bar. He was badly wounded in September 1918, and walked with a limp for the rest of his life. He left with the rank of Lieutenant-Colonel.

During the Second World War, Rhodes, by then a mill-owner and Chairman of the Saddleworth Urban District Council, became the commanding officer of his nearby Local Defence Volunteers (LDV), formed in 1940 to defend Britain against the armies of the Third Reich, then in occupation of much of Northern Europe and having succeeded in expelling the British Expeditionary Force from Europe at Dunkirk.

Initially, the LDV were issued only with an armband and brought along to parades and training such implements or weapons as they could improvise. Quite soon the LDV was jokingly said to stand for "Look, Duck & Vanish". The name was quickly changed to the Home Guard and within a few weeks was equipped with rifles, army pattern khaki uniform and had officers and NCOs appointed. Hervey Rhodes became the CO of the 36th (West Riding) Battalion, Duke of Wellington's Regiment. Major Rhodes (soon Lieutenant Colonel) visited the various companies, limping, complete with stick and pipe. The battalion was soon equipped with Thompson sub-machine guns and later, Sten guns and other weaponry. Rhodes served as CO of the battalion until it was disbanded. He then developed his political career, alongside his business interests at his mill in Delph.

In the 1945 general election, Rhodes stood without success as the Labour candidate in Royton, Lancashire. A few months later he was elected as Member of Parliament for Ashton-under-Lyne in a by-election on 1 October created by William Jowitt's elevation to the peerage.

Rhodes was parliamentary private secretary to Hilary Marquand, as Paymaster General and Minister of Pensions. In 1950, he was promoted to Parliamentary Secretary to the Board of Trade, serving until Labour's defeat at the 1951 general election.

He served as MP until the 1964 general election, when he was succeeded by Robert Sheldon. He was created a life peer on 14 September 1964 as Baron Rhodes, of Saddleworth in the West Riding of the County of York. He again held office as Parliamentary Secretary to the Board of Trade from 1964 until 1967. He served as Lord Lieutenant of Lancashire from 1968. He was made a Privy Counsellor in 1969, a Knight Companion of the Garter in 1972 and served as Deputy-Lord Lieutenant of Greater Manchester from 1974. He died in Oldham aged 92.

Coat of arms of Hervey Rhodes, Baron Rhodes
Crest A cotton plant fructed Proper between to the dexter a rose Argent and to the sinister a rose Gules both barbed and seeded stalked and leaved Proper. Escutcheon Vert semy of acorns or two trumpets in saltire the mouth pieces downward on a chief Or two Lancashire child's clogs toes inward Sable the caps and studs Or. Supporters Dexter a lion Or, sinister a ram Proper. Motto Eia Age (Come On!)

== See also ==
- Ashton-under-Lyne (UK Parliament constituency)
- 1945 Ashton-under-Lyne by-election

Parliament of the United Kingdom
Preceded by William Jowitt	Member of Parliament for Ashton-under-Lyne; 1945–1964	Succeeded by Robert Sheldon
Political offices
Preceded by John Edwards	Parliamentary Secretary to the Board of Trade; 1950–1951	Succeeded by Henry Strauss
Honorary titles
Preceded by The Earl of Derby	Lord Lieutenant of Lancashire; 1968–1971	Succeeded by The Lord Clitheroe
