= Charles Hindley (politician) =

English cotton mill-owner and Radical politician

Charles Hindley (25 June 1796 – 30 November 1857) was an English cotton mill-owner and Radical politician who sat as Member of Parliament for Ashton-under-Lyne, Lancashire from 1835 until his death in 1857. He was active in the Factory Reform movement, in the opposition to the New Poor Law, and in opposition to state involvement in religious and educational matters, but was rarely prominent in them, being more sought after as a chairman of meetings than as a speaker at them, and too inclined to moderation and compromise to be accepted as a reliable leader. He was the first member of the Moravian Church to be a British member of parliament. A portrait of Hindley is in the collection of the National Portrait Gallery, London.

== Family life ==
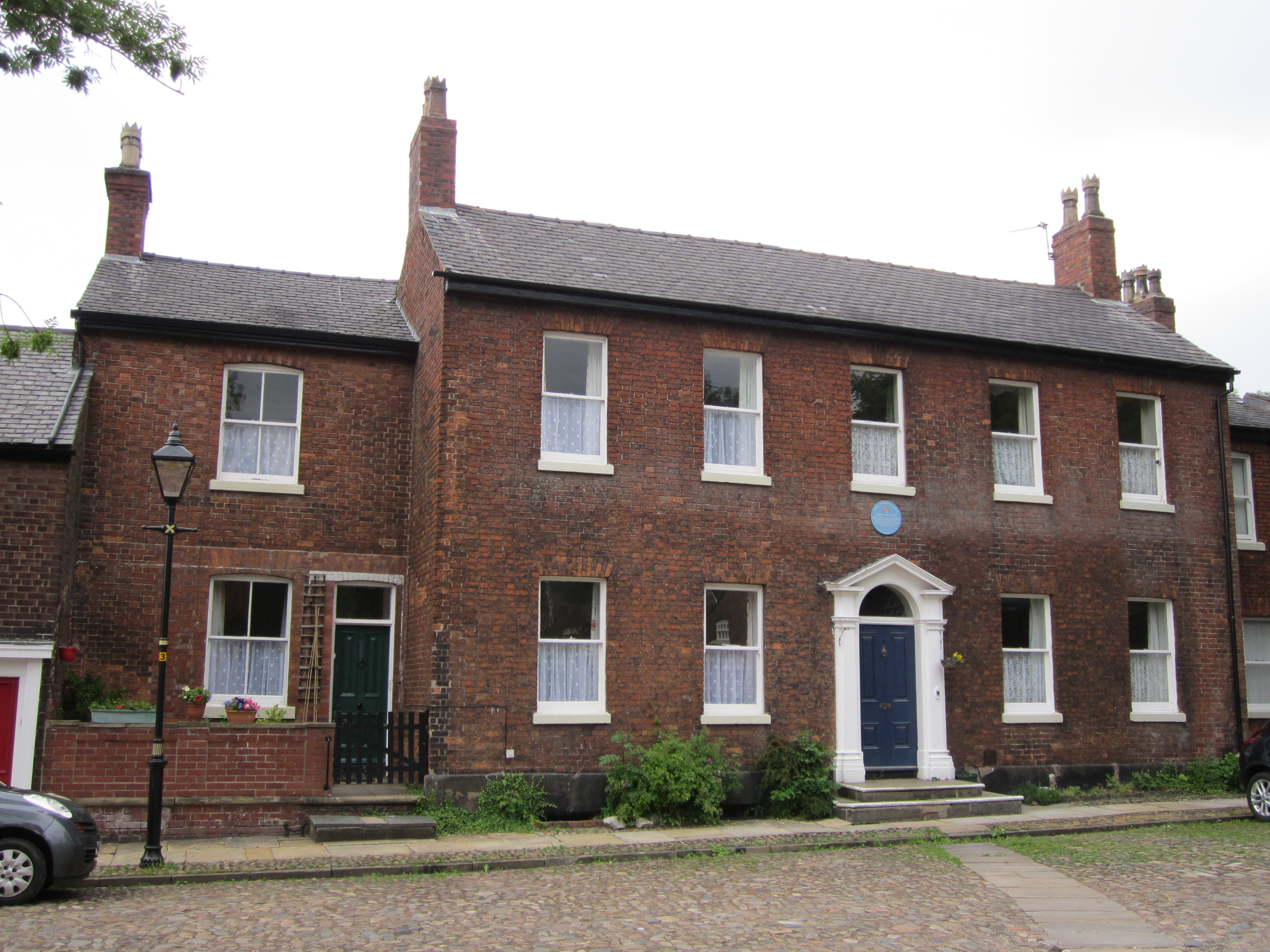
Hindley's home in the Fairfield Moravian Settlement

Hindley was the third son of Ignatius (a considerable calico and muslin manufacturer) and Mary Hindley (maiden name Molly Ambler); like them he was a member of the Moravian Church and remained so throughout his life . In about 1816, he became manager of his eldest brother John's small cotton mill in Dukinfield. In 1821, after the death of his brother he married Hannah, sister of John's widow Mary and daughter of Nathaniel Buckley, a clothier of Saddleworth (formerly of Staley, and described as a cotton spinner of Duckinfield when John and Mary married). (Note: In 1825 a partnership between 'John Wimpenny, Charles Hindley and Mary Hindley, cotton spinners Duckinfield' was dissolved. probably because Wimpenny was retiring; he died 1827, probate about £5,000: he had married first Dorothy Charlesworth in 1789 and then another Mary Buckley (sister to Nathaniel) in 1803) Charles and Hannah had six children; one daughter (Hannah) survived to adulthood and married Henry Woods, another daughter died aged twelve, none of the other four children reached their second birthday. Hindley's first wife died in July 1837, and he remarried (June 1839) Ann, the sister of John Fort of Read Hall. Both Woods and Fort were MPs (Fort for Clitheroe, Woods for Wigan); both were active in the cotton industry. Hindley was in poor health in 1838 (from obstruction of the bile duct); in 1849 his health was so poor that there was talk of his having to retire as an MP, but he recuperated considerably as a result of a tour he made of Egypt, Palestine and Greece in 1849–50. Hindley's second wife died just before Christmas in 1854, his only surviving child died as a result of childbirth in July 1857:

== Politics ==
=== Parliamentary career ===
Hindley stood for election at Ashton-under-Lyne from its enfranchisement as a single-seat parliamentary borough in 1832 until his death; in 1832 he was defeated by Colonel Williams a veteran radical reformer from Liverpool. In 1835 he stood both at Warrington (where he was defeated) and at Ashton (where he was elected); at all subsequent elections he was returned as Ashton's MP. In his early political life a Tory paper characterised him as a Durhamite Radical; he described himself as an avowed radical since "radicalism was the best security for liberty and for every institution worth preserving". His support for radicalism reflected the views of his supporters in Ashton (it was said that the only Parliamentary vote of his to give him any trouble with his constituency was his vote in favour of the annual allowance to the Queen Dowager:) there was however a persistent suspicion/aspersion that his instincts were less radical than theirs.

He was a supporter of parliamentary reform, of disestablishment of the Church of England, and of Free Trade. He was prominent in the Peace Society and in the International Peace Congress movement. Many of his political views mirrored those of Richard Cobden, but unlike Manchester School Liberals, he was an early supporter of the factory reform movement, and opposed to the New Poor Law. J R Stephens, a local Independent Methodist minister prominent in the Ten Hours and anti-poor law movements, declared that he had first been made aware of the factory reform issue by Hindley. (Note: Stephens, however was opposing the New Poor Law well before Hindley. The two seem to initially have been drawn together by their advocacy of disestablishment: there must also be some suspicion that Hindley's connection with South Australia is in some way connected with the prominence of three of J. R. Stephens' brothers in the early years of South Australia; one (Samuel) was the first Colonial Manager for the Company.) Hindley claimed to have consistently opposed the New Poor Law since his entry into Parliament; his failure to vote for Fielden's motion for repeal of the Poor Law Amendment Act being explicable by his absence due to illness.

He was the first member of the Moravian Church to be elected as an MP.

=== Parliamentary reform ===
In June 1837, he was one of a handful of MPs present (in the British Coffee House, London) at a meeting of the Working Men's Association which passed a series of resolutions including "that we agree to support and vote for a Bill, or Bills, to be brought into the House of Commons, embodying the principles of Universal Suffrage, equal representation, free election of representatives, without reference to property, the Ballot, and short Parliaments of fixed duration, the limit not to exceed three years" - effectively the birth of the Chartist movement. However, in practice, Hindley was far from being a Chartist: he held that to achieve anything radicals should at all times ally themselves to the Whigs, and be prepared to accept compromises falling short of their declared aims.

=== Factory reform ===
Hindley, although a mill-owner, was a supporter of Lord Ashley's motions for factory reform. He went beyond Ashley in arguing that Parliament should legislate on the hours cotton mills could run ('restriction of motive power') rather than the hours individuals could work: restriction of motive power was the foundation of any good and effective act. The actual limit set on hours worked was to him always less important than that the limit was generally agreed and easily enforced: and following the defeat of the Ten-Hour Bill of 1846, Hindley privately urged the short-time movement to introduce an Eleven-Hour Bill (which from the 1846 debate he believed would pass) in the next session of Parliament. His advice was rejected with some heat (it being claimed that Hindley had promised not to raise the issue of an eleven-hour compromise) and a Ten-Hour Bill was introduced and passed in 1847. When the Factories Act 1847 was in danger of being circumvented, he joined with (and slightly anticipated) Ashley in supporting the Compromise Act 1850, which increased working hours slightly in return for an agreed and enforceable regulation of hours worked.

=== Dissent and voluntarism ===
Hindley was a voluntarist, holding that the state should have nothing to do with religious matters; consequently he called for disestablishment of the Church of England and removal of all its privileges, but also objected to state support of non-conformists (e.g. the Regium Donum ) and Catholics (e.g. the Maynooth grant). He objected to the mal-organisation of the Church (this was particularly evident on Tameside: the living of Ashton, worth £1200 a year, was held by a rector permanently resident in Oxfordshire, his duties being performed by curates; Stalybridge's parish church was in Stockport, eight miles away) but made no criticism of its doctrines. He was a generous contributor to the subscription to erect an Anglican church in Stalybridge; when one was built he presented it with a set of Communion plate.

On education, he initially held that the state should not be involved (since education must include religious education). Consequently, he was prominent in the opposition to Graham's Factory Education Bill of 1843, although (unlike other opponents such as Edward Baines Junior) he did not contradict the picture painted by the Factory Inspectorate of the failure of voluntarism to deliver "efficient" education to the factory children of Ashton, noting only that the Inspectorate showed that the voluntary efforts of the Dissenters had achieved more than the state church. On the defeat of Graham's Bill, he threw himself into efforts to raise money to build and support denominational schools on voluntarist principles, donating generously himself. By 1847, however, whilst his fundraising had met an enthusiastic response, raising over £120,000 for Congregational schools, he could no longer believe that the voluntary principle was sufficient for the education of the people, and objected only to the details, rather than the principle, of that year's Education Bill.

== Business interests ==
Hindley had made his money by cotton-spinning, but once an MP does not appear to have been actively involved. In 1836 mills associated with Hindley were fined for breaches of the current Factory Act, including two failures to keep a "time book" (a record of the time worked by children and young persons). In 1848, a mill associated with Hindley worked 13-hour days; when attention was drawn to this Hindley responded that only adult males had been employed, and that he had known nothing about this; he was only a partner and the management of the mill was entirely in the hands of the active partner (in this case a nephew of his). (Note: W H Sutcliffe, his partner in two separate firms running two distinct mills (and a son of one of Hannah's Buckley sisters). Other partnerships are known: in 1832, Hindley, James Hyde & Robert Hyde claimed a vote in Ashton as joint occupiers of a cotton mill rated at £370 pa, then fitting out.)

He served as a director of the Protestant Dissenters' Life and Fire Assurance Society, (whose name evolved gradually to General Life...), The People's Provident Assurance Society, Manchester, Sheffield and Lincolnshire Railway, and the Union Bank of Australia.

Hindley was named as a director of the South Australian Company by October 1835 and hence was one of the founding shareholders of the South Australia Company listed on the Deed of Settlement of January 1836.

== Death and legacy ==
Hindley died in Westminster 30 November 1857, reportedly of heart disease, aged 61.

Augustus Granville, Hindley's doctor, later alleged that Hindley had been suffering from delirium, hallucination, and inflammation of the brain, but had been recovering thanks to the treatments ordered by Granville (mustard plasters, bleeding, calomel, and antimony), which had been effective on four or five similar past episodes. However, without consulting Granville, Hindley's son-in-law had called in another doctor, Robert Bentley Todd. (Note: The Dictionary of National Biography entry for Todd notes "Todd was the first to lay down definite principles for the treatment of specially serious cases of fever, such as influenza and rheumatic fever, besides inflammations associated with exhaustion in which life was in jeopardy. In these cases Todd proved from patient observation the desirability of a steady administering of alcoholic stimulants at short intervals, day and night, while the danger lasted. By this treatment not only was the strength maintained, but the period of convalescence was shortened.") According to Granville, Todd had taken a less sanguine view of Hindley's case than Granville and insisted that Hindley should take an ounce of brandy every half-hour, reducing this to half-an-ounce every half-hour on the representations of Granville, but soon reverting to the higher dosage. By the time Hindley died he had taken six pints of brandy in seventy-two hours. Granville later alleged that although Hindley's death certificate gave the cause of death as "cerebral affectation", Todd had caused his death by "an obstinate adherence to one of the most pernicious practices ever palmed upon an ignorant public". However, Granville made no mention of this in the two years between Hindley's death and Todd's. (Note: A subsequent follower of Todd stated in 1870 that "Much objection was made to the amount of stimulant given; but the arguments advanced against the system pursued have been satisfactorily answered" ...: "In what appeared hopeless cases, as much brandy as the patient could be made to swallow (an ounce and a half to two ounces in an hour) has been given for several hours in succession, and then as much as thirty ounces a day for several days, not only without producing the slightest intoxication, vomiting, or headache, but the treatment has been followed by recovery.")

One of the principal streets in Adelaide, Hindley Street, was named after him in 1836, although Hindley never visited South Australia.

== Notes ==
Parliament of the United Kingdom
Preceded by George Williams	Member of Parliament for Ashton-under-Lyne; 1835–1857	Succeeded by Thomas Milner Gibson
