= Cornelius Homan =

English politician (1900–1979)

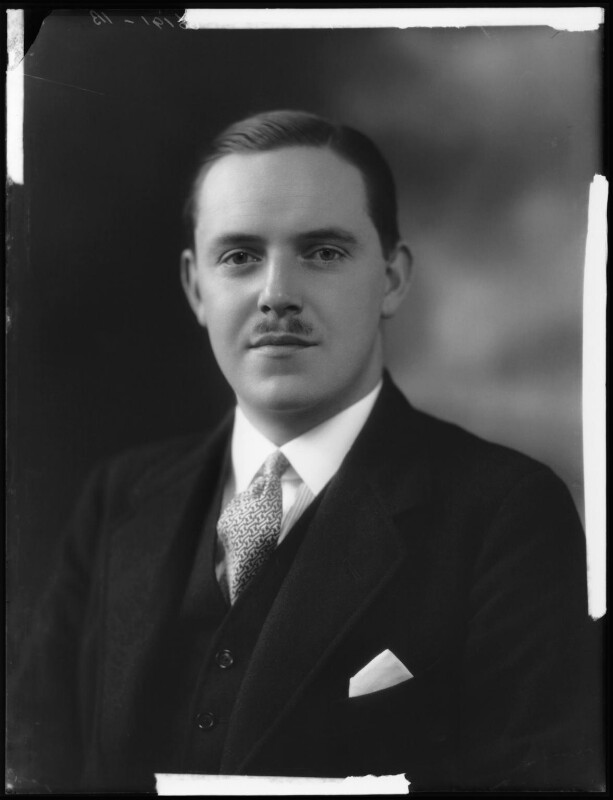
Homan in 1925

Cornelius William James Homan (17 August 1900 – 21 September 1979) was a Conservative Party politician in the United Kingdom who served as member of parliament (MP) for Ashton-under-Lyne from 1924 to 1928.

He was elected at the 1924 general election, after the constituency's Conservative MP Sir Walter de Frece stood instead in Blackpool.

However, he was disqualified in 1928 after being declared bankrupt. The resulting by-election on 28 October was won by the Labour Party candidate Albert Bellamy.

Parliament of the United Kingdom
Preceded by Sir Walter de Frece	Member of Parliament for Ashton-under-Lyne; 1924–1928	Succeeded by Albert Bellamy
