= Thomas Walton Mellor =

Thomas Walton Mellor (3 October 1814 – 17 February 1902) was a British cotton manufacturer and Conservative politician.

== Early years ==
Thomas was the third son of Thomas Mellor of Ashton-under-Lyne, Lancashire, and his wife Mary Walton of Stalybridge, Cheshire. He was christened on 30 October 1814 at the parish church of St Michael Ashton-under-Lyne.

== Career ==
He became a major "cotton master" in Ashton, and led the opposition to the costs of the town obtaining a charter of incorporation as a municipal borough in 1847. He was a magistrate for the borough of Ashton and the counties palatine of Chester and Lancaster.

In 1868, Mellor was elected as Member of Parliament for Ashton-under-Lyne, describing himself as "a Conservative with Liberal tendencies". He stood down from parliament in 1880.

== Family life ==
He married Jane Leigh of Compsall Bridge in 1849 and they had a son, John Edward.

== Death ==
Mellor died at Ashton-under-Lyne 17 February 1902.

Parliament of the United Kingdom
Preceded by Thomas Milner Gibson	Member of Parliament for Ashton-under-Lyne; 1868–1880	Succeeded by Hugh Mason
