= Fred Simpson (politician) =

British Labour Party politician

Fred Simpson MP

Member of Parliament for Ashton-under-Lyne
- In office 14 November 1935 – 23 September 1939
- Preceded by: John Broadbent
- Succeeded by: William Jowitt

Lord Mayor of Leeds
- In office 1931
- Preceded by: Arthur Hawkyard
- Succeeded by: Robert Holliday Blackburn

Personal details
- Born: Frederick Brown Simpson; 6 November 1886 Nottingham, England
- Died: 23 September 1939 (aged 52) Headingley, England
- Citizenship: British
- Party: British Labour Party

Frederick Brown Simpson (6 November 1886 – 23 September 1939) was a British Labour Party politician.

Born in Nottingham and in 1922 Simpson was elected to Leeds City Council as an alderman, and in 1931 was Lord Mayor of the city. He was a prominent trades unionist, and served as president of the Railway Clerks' Association from 1932 to 1937.

He was elected at the 1935 general election as Member of Parliament (MP) for Ashton-under-Lyne, defeating the Conservative MP John Broadbent by a majority of only 114 votes.

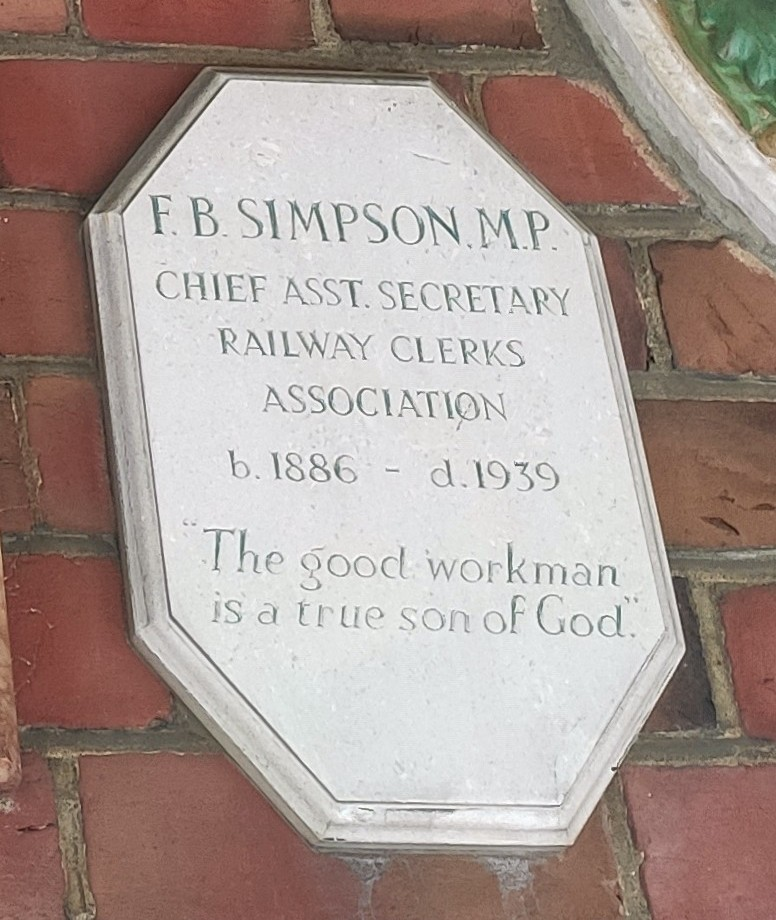
Plaque dedicated to Simpson at Golders Green Crematorium

F B Simpson died suddenly while playing golf at Headingley, near Leeds in September 1939. He was cremated at Golders Green Crematorium. In the by-election for his seat the Labour candidate William Jowitt was returned unopposed.

Parliament of the United Kingdom
Preceded by John Broadbent	Member of Parliament for Ashton-under-Lyne; 1935–1939	Succeeded by William Jowitt
Trade union offices
Preceded by Thomas Harry Gill	President of the Railway Clerks' Association; 1932–1937	Succeeded by Frederick Charles Watkins
Preceded by George Lathan	Chief Assistant Secretary of the Railway Clerks' Association; 1937–1939	Succeeded by Charles Gallie
