= Ashton-under-Lyne (constituency) =

Parliamentary constituency in the United Kingdom, 1832 onwards

Coordinates: 53°29′N 2°06′W

Ashton under Lyne
- Borough constituency for the House of Commons
- Interactive map of boundaries since 2024
- Location within North West England
- County: Greater Manchester
- Population: 90,484 (2011 census)
- Electorate: 72,278 (March 2020)
- Borough: Tameside
- Major settlements: Ashton-under-Lyne, Droylsden, Dukinfield

Current constituency
- Created: 1832
- Member of Parliament: Angela Rayner (Labour)
- Seats: 1
- Created from: Lancashire

Ashton-under-Lyne is a constituency (Note: A borough constituency (for the purposes of election expenses and type of returning officer).) in Greater Manchester that was created in 1832. It has been represented in the House of Commons of the UK Parliament by Angela Rayner of the Labour Party since 2015. (Note: As with all constituencies, the constituency elects one Member of Parliament (MP) by the first past the post system of election at least every five years.) Rayner served as Deputy Prime Minister and Secretary of State for Housing, Communities and Local Government in the cabinet of Keir Starmer from July 2024, and was elected as Deputy Leader of the Labour Party in 2020, serving in all positions until her resignation in September 2025. She returned as Housing Secretary in Andy Burnham's government in July 2026.

== Constituency profile ==
The constituency is located in Greater Manchester and consists of the north-western part of the metropolitan borough of Tameside. It is almost entirely urban and suburban, and contains the connected towns of Ashton-under-Lyne, Dukinfield, Audenshaw and Droylsden.

Like much of Greater Manchester, Ashton-under-Lyne and its surroundings were traditionally a significant hub for manufacturing, specifically of textiles. Residents of the constituency are, on average, less wealthy and less likely to be degree-educated compared to the country as a whole. The ethnic makeup of the constituency is similar to the national average. At the most recent borough council elections in 2024, voters in Ashton-under-Lyne and the nearby towns elected primarily Labour councillors. Voters in the constituency were in favour of leaving the European Union in the 2016 referendum, with an estimated 63% of the electorate voting for Brexit.

== Boundaries ==
Map of boundaries 1983–2024

=== Historic ===
Ashton-under-Lyne in Lancashire, boundaries used 1974–1983

1832–1885: The area defined by the Ashton-under-Lyne Improvement Act 1827 (7 & 8 Geo. 4. c. lxxvii).

1885–1918: The existing parliamentary borough, and so much of the parish of Ashton-under-Lyne included in the local government district of Hurst as was not already included in the parliamentary borough.

1918–1949: The Municipal Borough of Ashton-under-Lyne, and the Urban District of Hurst.

1950–1955: The Municipal Boroughs of Ashton-under-Lyne, and Mossley; and the Rural District of Limehurst.

1955–1983: The Municipal Boroughs of Ashton-under-Lyne, and Mossley; and the Rural District of Droylsden.

1983–2024: The Metropolitan Borough of Oldham wards of Failsworth East and Failsworth West; and the Metropolitan Borough of Tameside wards of Ashton Hurst, Ashton St. Michael's, Ashton Waterloo, Droylsden East, Droylsden West and St Peter's.

=== Current ===
Further to the 2023 review of Westminster constituencies which came into effect for the 2024 general election, the constituency is composed of the following wards of the Metropolitan Borough of Tameside (as they existed on 1 December 2020):

- Ashton Hurst; Ashton St. Michael's; Ashton Waterloo; Audenshaw; Droylsden East; Droylsden West; Dukinfield; St Peter's.

The constituency gained the Audenshaw and Dukinfield wards from the abolished constituency of Denton and Reddish, and lost the two Failsworth wards to Manchester Central.

== Members of Parliament ==
Election	Member	Party	Notes
1832	George Williams	Radical	
1835	Charles Hindley	Radical	
1857	Thomas Milner Gibson	Radical	
1859	Thomas Milner Gibson	Liberal	
1868	Thomas Walton Mellor	Conservative	
1880	Hugh Mason	Liberal	
1885	John Addison	Conservative	
1895	Herbert Whiteley	Conservative	Also later MP for Droitwich
1906	Alfred Scott	Liberal	
1910	Sir Max Aitken	Conservative	
1916 by-election	Sir Albert Stanley	Conservative	President of the Board of Trade
1920 by-election	Sir Walter de Frece	Conservative	Also later MP for Blackpool
1924	Cornelius Homan	Conservative	
1928 by-election	Albert Bellamy	Labour	President of the National Union of Railwaymen
1931 by-election	John Broadbent	Conservative	
1935	Fred Simpson	Labour	President of the Railway Clerks' Association
1939 by-election	Sir William Jowitt	Labour	later Lord High Chancellor of Great Britain
1945 by-election	Hervey Rhodes	Labour	Parliamentary Secretary to the Board of Trade
1964	Robert Sheldon	Labour	Financial Secretary to the Treasury
2001	David Heyes	Labour	
2015	Angela Rayner	Labour	Deputy Prime Minister; Secretary of State for Housing, Communities and Local Government

In the 1886 election, voting resulted in a tie between incumbent John Edmund Wentworth Addison and the Liberal candidate. Under the legislation of the time, the Returning officer had a casting vote, and Addison was reelected. In the by-election of 29 October 1928, the turnout was 89.1%, a record for Great Britain. The mayor arranged for the result to be signalled by coloured rockets.

== Elections ==
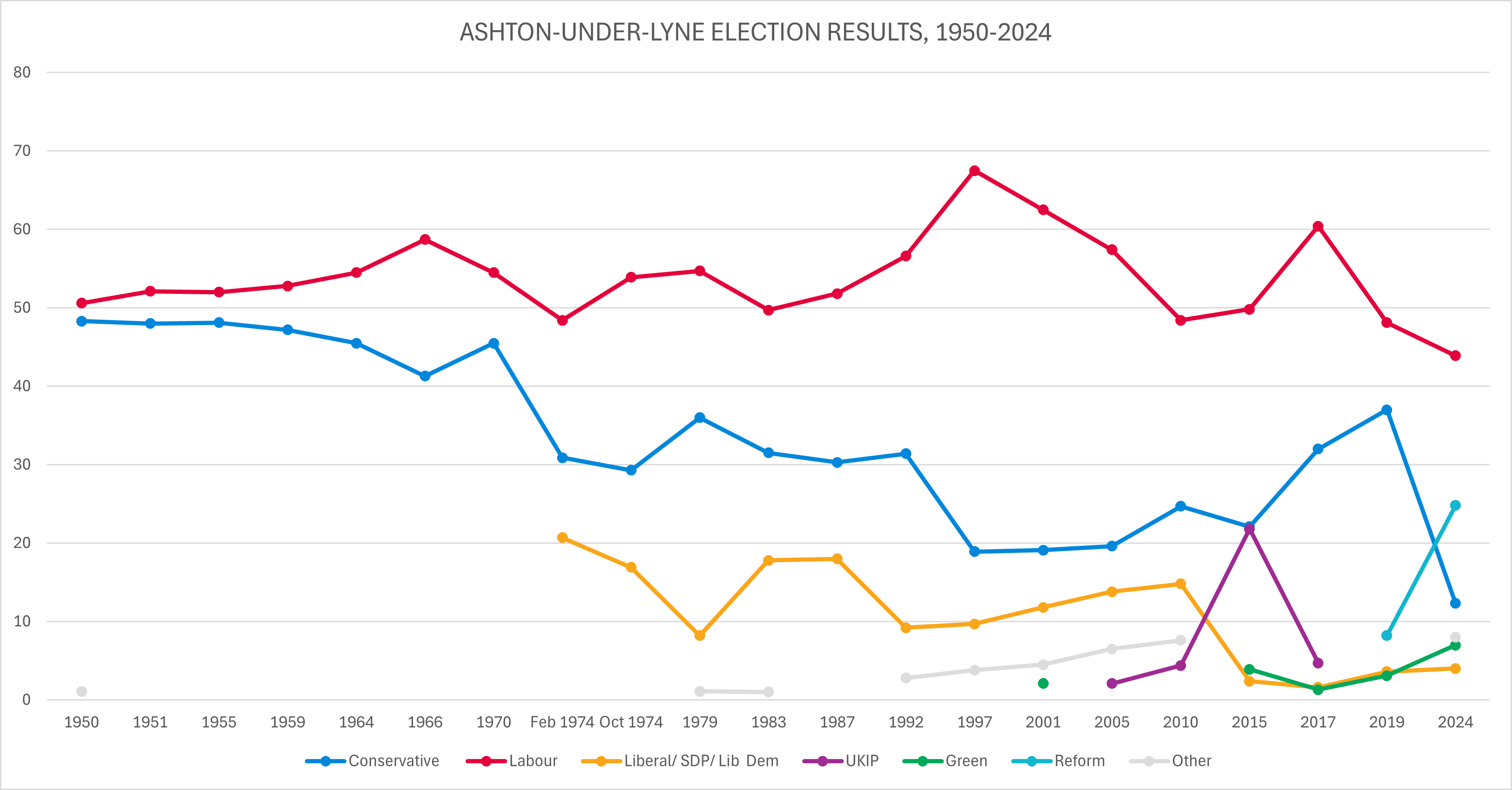
Election results 1950–2024

=== Elections in the 2020s ===
General election 2024: Ashton-under-Lyne
Party	Candidate	Votes	%	±%
Labour	Angela Rayner	15,575	43.9	−3.6
Reform	Robert Barrowcliffe	8,784	24.8	+16.3
Conservative	Lizzie Hacking	4,375	12.3	−23.9
Workers Party	Aroma Hassan	2,835	8.0	N/A
Green	Lee Huntbach	2,481	7.0	+3.5
Liberal Democrats	Dominic Hardwick	1,411	4.0	−0.3
Majority		6,791	19.1	+7.8
Turnout		35,461	49.9	−6.4
Registered electors		71,002		
Labour hold		Swing		

=== Elections in the 2010s ===
2019 notional result
Party	Vote	%
Labour	19,667	47.5
Conservative	14,978	36.2
Brexit Party	3,518	8.5
Liberal Democrats	1,774	4.3
Green Party	1,440	3.5
Majority	4,689	11.3
Turnout	41,377	57.2
Electorate	72,278	

General election 2019: Ashton-under-Lyne
Party	Candidate	Votes	%	±%
Labour	Angela Rayner	18,544	48.1	−12.3
Conservative	Dan Costello	14,281	37.0	+5.0
Brexit Party	Derek Brocklehurst	3,151	8.2	N/A
Liberal Democrats	George Rice	1,395	3.6	+2.0
Green	Lee Huntbach	1,208	3.1	+1.8
Majority		4,263	11.1	−17.3
Turnout		38,579	56.3	−2.5
Registered electors		67,978		
Labour hold		Swing	−8.7	

General election 2017: Ashton-under-Lyne
Party	Candidate	Votes	%	±%
Labour	Angela Rayner	24,005	60.4	+10.6
Conservative	Jack Rankin	12,710	32.0	+9.9
UKIP	Maurice Jackson	1,878	4.7	−17.1
Liberal Democrats	Carly Hicks	646	1.6	−0.8
Green	Andy Hunter-Rossall	534	1.3	−2.6
Majority		11,295	28.4	+0.7
Turnout		39,773	58.8	+1.3
Registered electors		65,751		
Labour hold		Swing	+0.4	

General election 2015: Ashton-under-Lyne
Party	Candidate	Votes	%	±%
Labour	Angela Rayner	19,366	49.8	+1.4
Conservative	Tracy Sutton	8,610	22.1	−2.6
UKIP	Maurice Jackson	8,468	21.8	+17.4
Green	Charlotte Hughes	1,531	3.9	N/A
Liberal Democrats	Carly Hicks	943	2.4	−12.4
Majority		10,756	27.7	+4.0
Turnout		38,918	57.5	+0.6
Registered electors		68,343		
Labour hold		Swing	+2.0	

UKIP originally selected Angela McManus as candidate, but she changed to the Stalybridge and Hyde constituency.

General election 2010: Ashton-under-Lyne
Party	Candidate	Votes	%	±%
Labour	David Heyes	18,604	48.4	−10.1
Conservative	Seema Kennedy	9,510	24.7	+4.6
Liberal Democrats	Paul Larkin	5,703	14.8	+3.2
BNP	David Lomas	2,929	7.6	+1.7
UKIP	Angela McManus	1,686	4.4	+2.3
Majority		9,094	23.7	−14.0
Turnout		38,432	56.9	+5.4
Registered electors		67,714		
Labour hold		Swing	−7.3	

Back to Elections

=== Elections in the 2000s ===
General election 2005: Ashton under Lyne
Party	Candidate	Votes	%	±%
Labour	David Heyes	21,211	57.4	−5.1
Conservative	Graeme Brown	7,259	19.6	+0.5
Liberal Democrats	Les Jones	5,108	13.8	+2.0
BNP	Anthony Jones	2,051	5.5	+1.0
UKIP	John Whittaker	768	2.1	N/A
Local Community Party	Jack Crossfield	570	1.5	N/A
Majority		13,952	37.8	−6.6
Turnout		36,967	51.3	+2.2
Registered electors		71,291		
Labour hold		Swing	−2.8	

General election 2001: Ashton under Lyne
Party	Candidate	Votes	%	±%
Labour	David Heyes	22,340	62.5	−5.0
Conservative	Tim Charlesworth	6,822	19.1	+0.2
Liberal Democrats	Kate Fletcher	4,237	11.8	+2.1
BNP	Roger Woods	1,617	4.5	N/A
Green	Nigel Rolland	748	2.1	N/A
Majority		15,518	43.4	−5.2
Turnout		35,764	49.1	−16.4
Registered electors		72,820		
Labour hold		Swing	−2.6	

Back to Elections

=== Elections in the 1990s ===
General election 1997: Ashton under Lyne
Party	Candidate	Votes	%	±%
Labour	Robert Sheldon	31,919	67.5	+10.9
Conservative	Richard Mayson	8,954	18.9	−12.5
Liberal Democrats	Tim Pickstone	4,603	9.7	+0.5
Referendum	Lorraine Clapham	1,346	2.8	N/A
Monster Raving Loony	Prince Cymbal	458	1.0	N/A
Majority		22,965	48.6	+23.4
Turnout		47,280	65.5	−8.4
Registered electors		72,308		
Labour hold		Swing	+11.7	

General election 1992: Ashton-under-Lyne
Party	Candidate	Votes	%	±%
Labour	Robert Sheldon	24,550	56.6	+4.8
Conservative	John R. Pinniger	13,615	31.4	+1.1
Liberal Democrats	Charles W. Turner	4,005	9.2	−8.8
Liberal	Colin L. Hall	907	2.1	−17.9
Natural Law	John Brannigan	289	0.7	N/A
Majority		10,935	25.2	+3.7
Turnout		43,366	73.9	−0.1
Registered electors		58,701		
Labour hold		Swing	+1.9	

Back to Elections

=== Elections in the 1980s ===
General election 1987: Ashton under Lyne
Party	Candidate	Votes	%	±%
Labour	Robert Sheldon	22,389	51.8	+2.1
Conservative	Henry Cadman	13,103	30.3	−1.2
Liberal	Mark Hunter	7,760	18.0	N/A
Majority		9,286	21.5	+3.3
Turnout		43,250	74.0	+2.4
Registered electors		58,440		
Labour hold		Swing	+1.7	

General election 1983: Ashton under Lyne
Party	Candidate	Votes	%	±%
Labour	Robert Sheldon	20,987	49.7	
Conservative	Richard Spring	13,290	31.5	
SDP	John Adler	7,521	17.8	
Independent	Dave Hallsworth	407	1.0	
Majority		7,697	18.2	
Turnout		42,196	71.6	
Labour hold		Swing		

Back to Elections

=== Elections in the 1970s ===
General election 1979: Ashton under Lyne
Party	Candidate	Votes	%	±%
Labour	Robert Sheldon	24,535	54.7	+0.8
Conservative	Alan Fearn	16,156	36.0	+6.7
Liberal	G. Taylor	3,699	8.2	−8.7
National Front	D. Jones	486	1.1	N/A
Majority		8,379	18.7	−5.9
Turnout		44,876	76.6	+4.4
Registered electors		58,588		
Labour hold		Swing	−3.0	

General election October 1974: Ashton under Lyne
Party	Candidate	Votes	%	±%
Labour	Robert Sheldon	23,490	53.9	+5.5
Conservative	M.H. Litchfield	12,763	29.3	−1.6
Liberal	T.G. Jones	7,356	16.9	−3.8
Majority		10,727	24.6	+7.1
Turnout		43,609	72.2	−7.3
Registered electors		60,393		
Labour hold		Swing	+3.6	

General election February 1974: Ashton under Lyne
Party	Candidate	Votes	%	±%
Labour	Robert Sheldon	23,019	48.4	−6.1
Conservative	Timothy Maxwell Aitken	14,718	30.9	−14.6
Liberal	J.G. Jones	9,837	20.7	N/A
Majority		8,301	17.5	+8.5
Turnout		47,574	79.5	+8.1
Registered electors		59,881		
Labour hold		Swing	+4.3	

General election 1970: Ashton under Lyne
Party	Candidate	Votes	%	±%
Labour	Robert Sheldon	23,927	54.5	−4.2
Conservative	Alan d'A. Fearn	19,973	45.5	+4.2
Majority		3,954	9.0	−8.4
Turnout		43,900	71.4	−2.3
Registered electors		61,468		
Labour hold		Swing	−4.2	

Back to Elections

=== Elections in the 1960s ===
General election 1966: Ashton under Lyne
Party	Candidate	Votes	%	±%
Labour	Robert Sheldon	24,728	58.7	+4.2
Conservative	Henry Donald Moore	17,396	41.3	−4.2
Majority		7,332	17.4	+8.4
Turnout		42,124	73.7	−3.7
Registered electors		57,159		
Labour hold		Swing	+4.2	

General election 1964: Ashton under Lyne
Party	Candidate	Votes	%	±%
Labour	Robert Sheldon	24,657	54.5	+1.7
Conservative	Henry Donald Moore	20,550	45.5	−1.7
Majority		4,107	9.0	+3.4
Turnout		45,213	77.4	−3.7
Registered electors		58,411		
Labour hold		Swing	+1.7	

Back to Elections

=== Elections in the 1950s ===
General election 1959: Ashton under Lyne
Party	Candidate	Votes	%	±%
Labour	Hervey Rhodes	25,991	52.8	+0.8
Conservative	Robert Horrocks	23,239	47.2	−0.9
Majority		2,752	5.6	+1.7
Turnout		49,230	81.1	+1.0
Registered electors		60,706		
Labour hold		Swing	+0.9	

General election 1955: Ashton under Lyne
Party	Candidate	Votes	%	±%
Labour	Hervey Rhodes	26,216	52.0	−0.1
Conservative	Edwin Hodson	24,251	48.1	+0.1
Majority		1,965	3.9	−0.2
Turnout		50,467	80.1	−4.8
Registered electors		62,392		
Labour hold		Swing	−0.1	

General election 1951: Ashton under Lyne
Party	Candidate	Votes	%	±%
Labour	Hervey Rhodes	21,424	52.1	+1.5
Conservative	Kenneth Lewis	19,740	48.0	−0.3
Majority		1,684	4.1	+1.8
Turnout		41,164	84.9	−1.5
Registered electors		48,490		
Labour hold		Swing	+0.9	

General election 1950: Ashton under Lyne
Party	Candidate	Votes	%	±%
Labour	Hervey Rhodes	20,970	50.6	
Conservative	Gilbert Burdett Howcroft	20,046	48.3	
Communist	H.H.H. Blackwell	459	1.1	
Majority		924	2.3	
Turnout		41,475	86.4	
Labour hold		Swing		

Back to Elections

=== Elections in the 1940s ===
1945 Ashton-under-Lyne by-election
Party	Candidate	Votes	%	±%
Labour	Hervey Rhodes	12,889	54.1	−2.3
Conservative	Robert Cary	8,360	35.0	−8.6
Liberal	A. Beale	2,604	10.9	N/A
Majority		4,529	19.1	+6.3
Turnout		23,853	70.5	−8.1
Labour hold		Swing	+3.2	

General election 1945: Ashton-under-Lyne
Party	Candidate	Votes	%	±%
Labour	William Jowitt	14,998	56.4	
Conservative	Francis Henry Gerard Heron Goodhart	11,604	43.6	
Majority		3,394	12.8	
Turnout		26,602	78.6	
Labour hold		Swing		

Back to Elections

=== Elections in the 1930s ===
1939 Ashton-under-Lyne by-election
Party	Candidate	Votes	%	±%
Labour	William Jowitt	Unopposed		
Labour hold				

General election 1935: Ashton-under-Lyne
Party	Candidate	Votes	%	±%
Labour	Fred Simpson	14,140	50.2	+13.1
Conservative	John Broadbent	14,026	49.8	−2.7
Majority		114	0.4	N/A
Turnout		28,166	81.0	−4.3
Registered electors		34,789		
Labour gain from Conservative		Swing	+7.9	

General election 1931: Ashton-under-Lyne
Party	Candidate	Votes	%	±%
Conservative	John Broadbent	15,652	52.5	+19.5
Labour	John William Gordon	11,074	37.1	−7.3
Liberal	James Taylor Middleton	2,696	9.0	N/A
New Party	Charles B. Hobhouse	424	1.4	N/A
Majority		4,578	15.4	+4.0
Turnout		29,846	85.3	−0.6
Conservative gain from Labour		Swing	+5.1	

1931 Ashton-under-Lyne by-election
Party	Candidate	Votes	%	±%
Conservative	John Broadbent	12,420	44.6	+11.6
Labour	John William Gordon	11,005	39.4	−5.0
New Party	Allan Young	4,472	16.0	N/A
Majority		1,415	5.2	N/A
Turnout		27,897	80.2	−5.7
Conservative gain from Labour		Swing	+8.3	

Back to Elections

=== Elections in the 1920s ===
General election 1929: Ashton-under-Lyne
Party	Candidate	Votes	%	±%
Labour	Albert Bellamy	13,170	44.4	+3.8
Unionist	John Broadbent	9,763	33.0	+2.7
Liberal	William Gilbert Greenwood	6,693	22.6	−6.5
Majority		3,407	11.4	+1.4
Turnout		29,626	85.9	−3.2
Labour hold		Swing	+0.6	

1928 Ashton-under-Lyne by-election
Party	Candidate	Votes	%	±%
Labour	Albert Bellamy	9,567	40.6	+7.8
Unionist	Gordon Touche	7,161	30.3	−9.2
Liberal	William Gilbert Greenwood	6,874	29.1	+1.4
Majority		2,406	10.3	N/A
Turnout		23,512	89.1	+0.8
Labour gain from Unionist		Swing	+8.5	

General election 1924: Ashton-under-Lyne
Party	Candidate	Votes	%	±%
Unionist	Cornelius Homan	8,971	39.5	+3.3
Labour	Cecil Malone	7,451	32.8	+4.1
Liberal	Henry Thomas Greenwood	6,692	27.7	−7.4
Majority		1,520	6.7	+5.6
Turnout		23,114	88.3	+3.0
Unionist hold		Swing	−0.4	

General election 1923: Ashton-under-Lyne
Party	Candidate	Votes	%	±%
Unionist	Walter de Frece	7,813	36.2	−21.4
Liberal	Henry Thomas Greenwood	7,574	35.1	N/A
Labour	Ellen Wilkinson	6,208	28.7	−13.7
Majority		239	1.1	−14.1
Turnout		21,595	85.3	+2.0
Unionist hold		Swing		

General election 1922: Ashton-under-Lyne
Party	Candidate	Votes	%	±%
Unionist	Walter de Frece	12,006	57.6	+14.3
Labour	Tom Gillinder	8,834	42.4	+2.8
Majority		3,172	15.2	+11.5
Turnout		20,840	83.3	+1.0
Unionist hold		Swing	+5.7	

1920 Ashton-under-Lyne by-election
Party		Candidate	Votes	%	±%
C	Unionist	Walter de Frece	8,864	43.3	−15.0
	Labour	William C. Robinson	8,127	39.6	N/A
	Liberal	Arthur Marshall	3,511	17.1	N/A
Majority			738	3.7	−12.9
Turnout			20,502	82.3	+13.9
	Unionist hold		Swing		
C indicates candidate endorsed by the coalition government.

Back to Elections

=== Elections in the 1910s ===
General election 1918: Ashton-under-Lyne
Party		Candidate	Votes	%	±%
C	Unionist	Albert Stanley	10,261	58.3	
	NFDDSS	Frederick Lister	7,334	41.7	
Majority			2,927	16.6	
Turnout			17,595	68.4	
	Unionist hold				
C indicates candidate endorsed by the coalition government.

1916 Ashton-under-Lyne by-election
Party	Candidate	Votes	%	±%
Unionist	Albert Stanley	Unopposed		
Unionist hold				

General election December 1910: Ashton-under-Lyne
Party	Candidate	Votes	%	±%
Conservative	Max Aitken	4,044	51.1	+5.2
Liberal	Alfred Scott	3,848	48.8	−0.5
Majority		196	2.4	N/A
Turnout		7,652	91.8	−3.6
Conservative gain from Liberal		Swing	+3.0	

General election January 1910: Ashton-under-Lyne
Party	Candidate	Votes	%	±%
Liberal	Alfred Scott	4,039	49.3	−7.0
Conservative	Herbert Whiteley	3,746	45.9	+2.2
Independent Labour	William Gee	413	5.0	N/A
Majority		293	3.4	−9.2
Turnout		8,198	95.4	+2.6
Liberal hold		Swing	−4.6	

Back to Elections

=== Elections in the 1900s ===
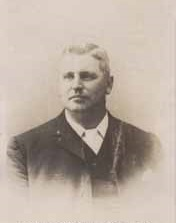
Scott

General election 1906: Ashton-under-Lyne
Party	Candidate	Votes	%	±%
Liberal	Alfred Scott	4,310	56.3	+20.4
Conservative	Herbert Whiteley	3,342	43.7	−9.4
Majority		968	12.6	N/A
Turnout		7,652	92.8	+6.6
Liberal gain from Conservative		Swing		

Whiteley

General election 1900: Ashton-under-Lyne
Party	Candidate	Votes	%	±%
Conservative	Herbert Whiteley	3,545	53.1	+0.5
Liberal	Ernest Albert Parkin	2,400	35.9	−5.1
Labour Repr. Cmte.	James Johnston	737	11.0	N/A
Majority		1,145	17.2	+5.6
Turnout		6,682	86.2	−5.1
Registered electors		7,753		
Conservative hold		Swing	+2.8	

Back to Elections

=== Elections in the 1890s ===
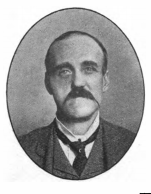
Sexton

General election 1895: Ashton-under-Lyne
Party	Candidate	Votes	%	±%
Conservative	Herbert Whiteley	3,434	52.6	+1.6
Liberal	William Woods	2,680	41.0	−8.0
Ind. Labour Party	James Sexton	415	6.4	N/A
Majority		754	11.6	+9.6
Turnout		6,529	91.3	−2.6
Registered electors		7,152		
Conservative hold		Swing	+4.8	

General election 1892: Ashton-under-Lyne
Party	Candidate	Votes	%	±%
Conservative	John Addison	3,358	51.0	+1.0
Liberal	Octavius Morgan	3,223	49.0	−1.0
Majority		135	2.0	+2.0
Turnout		6,581	93.9	+0.8
Registered electors		7,012		
Conservative hold		Swing	+1.0	

Back to Elections

=== Elections in the 1880s ===
General election 1886: Ashton-under-Lyne
Party	Candidate	Votes	%	±%
Conservative	John Addison	3,050*	50.0	−0.4
Liberal	Alexander Rowley	3,049	50.0	+0.4
Majority		1	0.0	−0.8
Turnout		6,099	93.1	−2.4
Registered electors		6,553		
Conservative hold		Swing	−0.4	

* Both candidates having received 3,049 votes each, Addison was elected on the Returning Officer's casting vote.

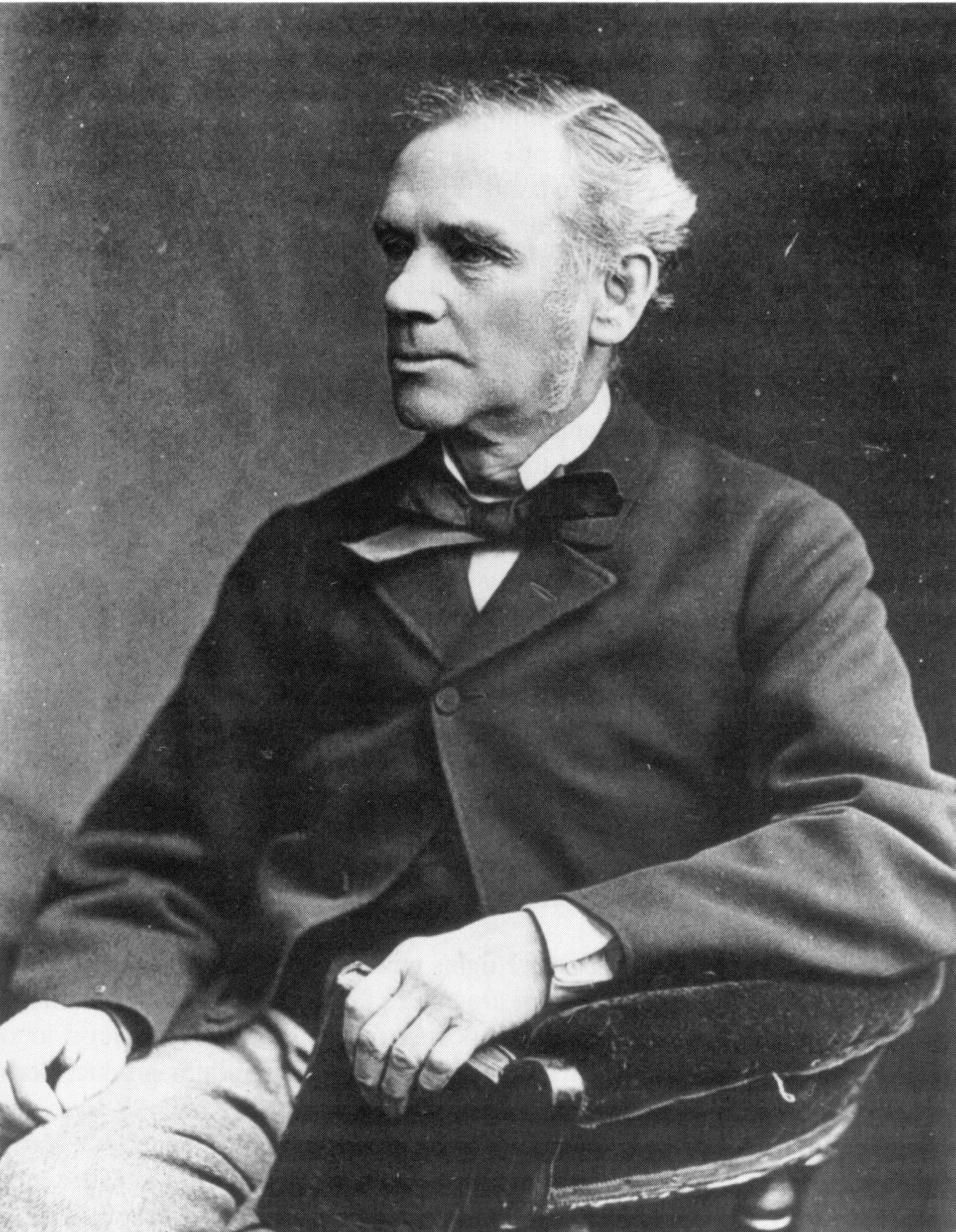
Mason

General election 1885: Ashton-under-Lyne
Party	Candidate	Votes	%	±%
Conservative	John Addison	3,153	50.4	+3.8
Liberal	Hugh Mason	3,104	49.6	−3.8
Majority		49	0.8	N/A
Turnout		6,257	95.5	+1.4
Registered electors		6,553		
Conservative gain from Liberal		Swing	+3.8	

General election 1880: Ashton-under-Lyne
Party	Candidate	Votes	%	±%
Liberal	Hugh Mason	2,966	53.4	+5.2
Conservative	John Ross Coulthart	2,586	46.6	−5.2
Majority		380	6.8	N/A
Turnout		5,552	94.1	+1.9
Registered electors		5,901		
Liberal gain from Conservative		Swing	+5.2	

Back to Elections

=== Elections in the 1870s ===
General election 1874: Ashton-under-Lyne
Party	Candidate	Votes	%	±%
Conservative	Thomas Walton Mellor	2,612	51.8	−0.6
Liberal	Abel Buckley	2,432	48.2	+0.6
Majority		180	3.6	−1.2
Turnout		5,044	92.2	+0.4
Registered electors		5,471		
Conservative hold		Swing		

Back to Elections

=== Elections in the 1860s ===
General election 1868: Ashton-under-Lyne
Party	Candidate	Votes	%	±%
Conservative	Thomas Walton Mellor	2,318	52.4	N/A
Liberal	Thomas Milner Gibson	2,109	47.6	N/A
Majority		209	4.8	N/A
Turnout		4,427	91.8	N/A
Conservative gain from Liberal		Swing	N/A	

General election 1865: Ashton-under-Lyne
Party	Candidate	Votes	%	±%
Liberal	Thomas Milner Gibson	Unopposed		
Registered electors		967		
Liberal hold				

Back to Elections

=== Elections in the 1850s ===
By-election, 9 July 1859: Ashton-under-Lyne
Party	Candidate	Votes	%	±%
Liberal	Thomas Milner Gibson	Unopposed		
Liberal hold				

- Caused by Gibson's appointment as President of the Board of Trade

By-election, 27 June 1859: Ashton-under-Lyne
Party	Candidate	Votes	%	±%
Liberal	Thomas Milner Gibson	Unopposed		
Liberal hold				

- Caused by Gibson's appointment as President of the Poor Law Board.

General election 1859: Ashton-under-Lyne
Party	Candidate	Votes	%	±%
Liberal	Thomas Milner Gibson	Unopposed		
Registered electors		1,081		
Liberal hold				

By-election, 14 December 1857: Ashton-under-Lyne
Party	Candidate	Votes	%	±%
Radical	Thomas Milner Gibson	522	57.2	N/A
Conservative	Booth Mason	390	42.8	N/A
Majority		132	14.4	N/A
Turnout		912	84.1	N/A
Radical hold		Swing	N/A	

- Caused by Hindley's death.

General election 1857: Ashton-under-Lyne
Party	Candidate	Votes	%	±%
Radical	Charles Hindley	Unopposed		
Registered electors		1,085		
Radical hold				

General election 1852: Ashton-under-Lyne
Party	Candidate	Votes	%	±%
Radical	Charles Hindley	Unopposed		
Registered electors		937		
Radical hold				

Back to Elections

=== Elections in the 1840s ===
General election 1847: Ashton-under-Lyne
Party	Candidate	Votes	%	±%
Radical	Charles Hindley	Unopposed		
Registered electors		871		
Radical hold				

General election 1841: Ashton-under-Lyne
Party	Candidate	Votes	%	±%
Radical	Charles Hindley	303	54.4	+2.5
Conservative	Jonah Harrop	254	45.6	+1.6
Majority		49	8.8	+0.9
Turnout		557	78.1	+2.3
Registered electors		713		
Radical hold		Swing	+0.5	

Back to Top

=== Elections in the 1830s ===
General election 1837: Ashton-under-Lyne
Party	Candidate	Votes	%	±%
Radical	Charles Hindley	237	51.9	−3.9
Conservative	James Wood	201	44.0	+16.4
Chartist	Rayner Stephens	19	4.2	N/A
Majority		36	7.9	−20.3
Turnout		457	75.8	+2.0
Registered electors		603		
Radical hold		Swing	−10.2	

General election 1835: Ashton-under-Lyne
Party	Candidate	Votes	%	±%
Radical	Charles Hindley	212	55.8	+12.0
Conservative	Thomas William Helps	105	27.6	+18.7
Radical	George Williams	63	16.6	−30.7
Majority		107	28.2	+24.7
Turnout		380	73.8	−12.1
Registered electors		515		
Radical hold		Swing	−3.4	

General election 1832: Ashton-under-Lyne
Party	Candidate	Votes	%
Radical	George Williams	176	47.3
Radical	Charles Hindley	163	43.8
Tory	Thomas William Helps	33	8.9
Majority		13	3.5
Turnout		372	85.9
Radical win (new seat)			

Back to Top

== See also ==
- List of parliamentary constituencies in Greater Manchester
- 1920 Ashton-under-Lyne by-election
- 1928 Ashton-under-Lyne by-election
- 1931 Ashton-under-Lyne by-election
- 1939 Ashton-under-Lyne by-election
- 1945 Ashton-under-Lyne by-election

== Sources ==
- Election results 1992–2005
- Election results 1951–1992
