= Walter de Frece =

British theatre impresario and politician (1870–1935)

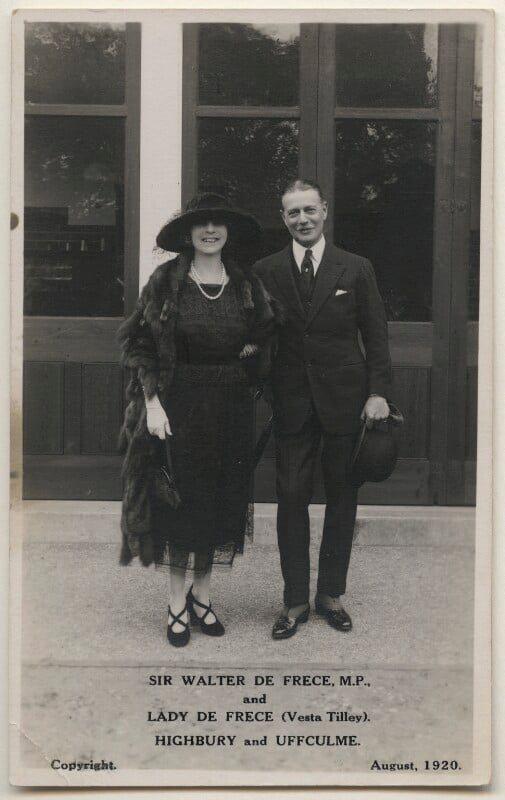
Tilley (left) and de Frece (right) in 1920

Sir Abraham Walter de Frece (7 October 1870 – 7 January 1935) was a British theatre impresario, and later Conservative Party politician, who served as a Member of Parliament (MP) from 1920 to 1931. His wife was the celebrated male impersonator Vesta Tilley.

== Early life ==
Abraham Walter de Frece was one of four sons of Henry (Harry) de Frece, of the Gaiety Music Hall in Camden Street, Liverpool, who was a prosperous agent in the Roscoe Arcade, a prominent theatrical manager, and a pioneering actors' agent from a large theatrical family. Henry de Frece had his sons educated well in order to keep them out of theatre, with Walter attending the Liverpool Institute and a school in Belgium.

However, by the time Walter returned home, his elder brother Jack was managing the Alhambra Wooden Theatre in Manchester Street, Liverpool, and Isaac managed the old Theatre Royal in Clayton Square, Liverpool. Walter's younger brother, Lauri de Frece, later became a celebrated comedian.

== Theatre career ==
By 1889, Walter was apprenticed with a notable Merseyside architect, when his father's Gaiety Theatre engaged the 25-year-old Tilly Ball as principal boy in pantomime that Christmas. Known professionally as Vesta Tilley (the 'Matchless' little Tilly), as the daughter of the former chairman of the St. George's Hall in Nottingham, Harry Ball, she had been on the stage since the age of four. By 1889 she was well known on the tour circuit as a male impersonator.

Walter fell for Tilly, and against romantic competition that included Sir Oswald Stoll, managed to take Tilly to a dance and secure a kiss. This inspired Walter to resign his apprenticeship, and leaving home secured himself a job in the office of Warner's Theatrical Agency. Walter married Tilley at Brixton Register Office on 16 August 1890.

Noting the decline in popularity of melodrama, and the increase in music hall revenues, de Frece secured the lease on the Metropole Theatre at Camberwell. Leaving Warner's, he turned it into the Camberwell Empire, a modern music hall. After this success, he began building a tour circuit by buying out the leases of other theatres which had fallen on hard times, including: the Grand Theatre, Margate; the Grand Theatre, Colchester; the Prince of Wales, Southampton; and a theatre at Boscombe managed by his brother-in-law, Harry Ball, junior. All were refurbished and renamed "Hippodromes," with music hall productions run by his company "The South of England Hippodromes, Ltd.," where his wife Tilley was a regular performer. He later added new Hippodromes in both Portsmouth and Southend.

After taking over the lease of the Empire Palace, Wolverhampton (later renamed the Hippodrome), in 1906 he joined the board of directors at the Manchester Palace. He then opened the New Tivoli Theatre of Varieties in Lime Street, Liverpool, in December 1906, but being so close to the Empire Palace of Moss and Stoll, the New Tivoli never made a profit.

After this setback, in 1908 he bought the old Metropole in Birkenhead, renamed The New Birkenhead Hippodrome, with an opening night that was topped by his wife. He then built his northern chain at a far quicker pace, acquiring the Bolton Hippodrome and then building the new Oldham Palace, which couldn't be named Hippodrome as there already was one in the town.

After the death of fellow impresario Thomas Barrasford in 1910, de Frece acquired most of his Barrasford Halls, having formed the holding company "Variety Theatres Controlling Company Ltd" in partnership with Alfred Butt. By 1914 this also controlled 18 theatres across both Southcoast Hippodromes Ltd and Barrasford Halls Ltd but during World War I, audience taste changed again, and with the advent of moving pictures, many theatres were being converted either in part or whole to new format cinemas. Resultantly, at the end of hostilities and after his knighthood in the 1919 King's Birthday Honours List, de Frece resigned all of his positions, allowing Charles Gulliver to succeed him as managing director of the Variety Theatres Controlling Company.

== Political career ==
After his decision to concentrate on a career in politics, Vesta Tilley made her last performance in 1920 at the Coliseum Theatre, London, at the age of 56. For the rest of her life she lived as Lady de Frece, and from the mid-1920s the couple made their home on the French Riviera, to assist with her declining health.

Sir Walter was first elected as MP for Ashton-under-Lyne at a by-election in 1920, after the constituency's Conservative MP Sir Albert Stanley was elevated to the peerage.

Sir Walter was re-elected at the 1922 general election and at the 1923 general election, when his majority was cut to only 239 votes. At the 1924 general election he did not stand again in Ashton-under-Lyne, but moved to the more promising Blackpool constituency, where he was returned with a majority of over 7,000 votes. He held the seat with a similar majority in 1929.

He represented Blackpool between the two wars; it was claimed by John Cryer, the Labour MP for Leyton and Wanstead, during a House of Commons debate, that Sir Walter only visited the United Kingdom twice a year, once for the Budget speech and again for Ascot and that he had managed to convince his electorate that he was representing their interests by signing a stack of House of Commons notepaper every time he returned. His secretary, claimed Mr Cryer, would then write responses to each letter from his constituents on the signed notepaper, making it appear to voters that they had received a personal response. It was suggested that although he was once a national MP for Blackpool, he actually never went near the place: "in fact he couldn't find it on a map". However, based on entries in Hansard, Sir Walter did make a number of contributions to debates in the House of Commons, initially representing his constituents in Ashton-under-Lyne (from 1920 to 1924), and latterly those in Blackpool from (1924 to 1931).

== Later life ==
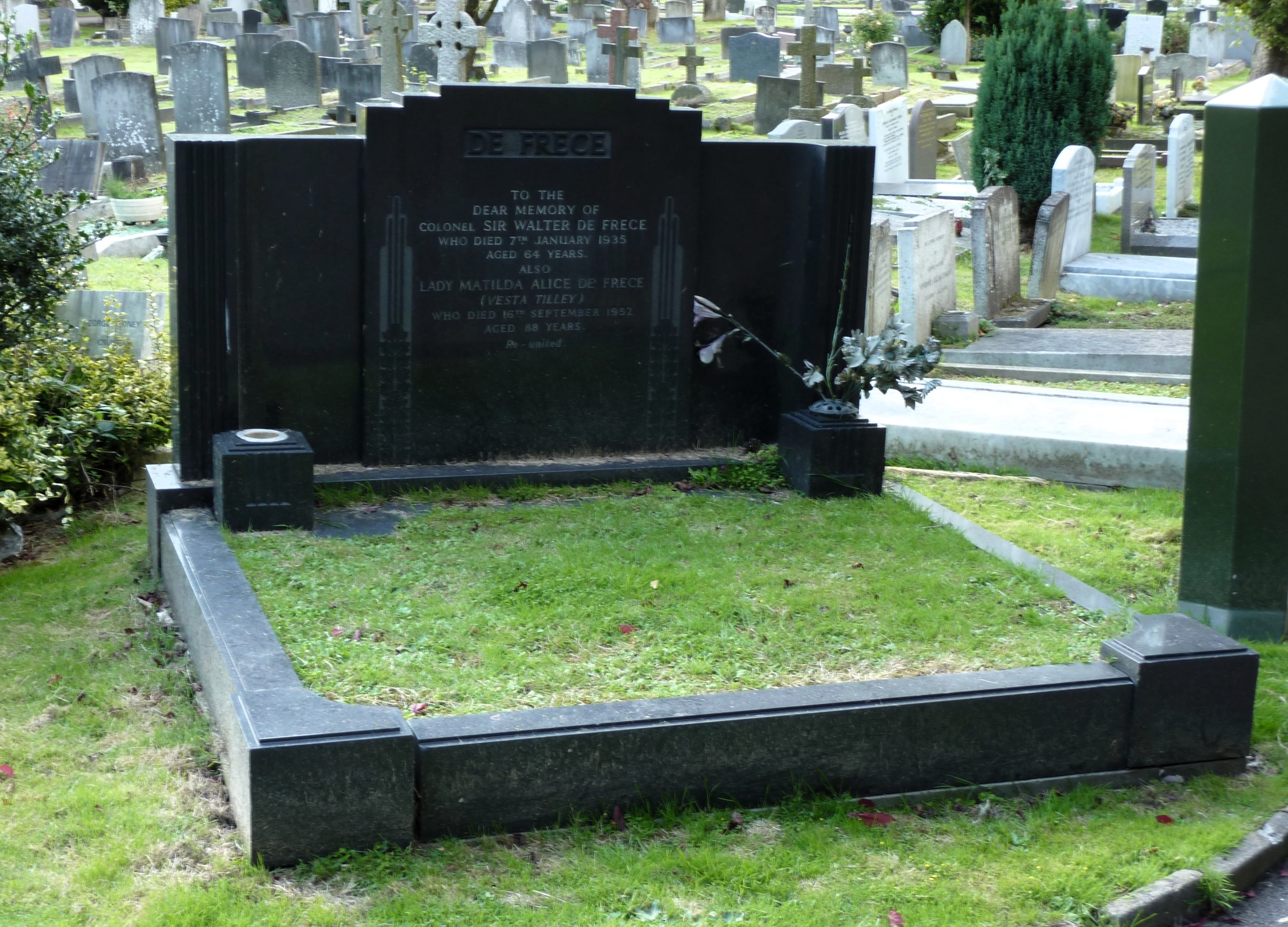
The grave of Walter de Frece and his wife Vesta Tilley at Putney Vale Cemetery, London in 2014

In light of the poor health of his wife, he retired from the House of Commons at the 1931 general election, and went to live in the home they had in Monaco. Walter died before his wife, at the age of 64. He is buried in Putney Vale Cemetery, where his wife, who died in 1952 at the age of 88, was later laid to rest beside him. A black granite memorial marks the spot.

== Sources ==
- Craig, F. W. S. (1983) [1969]. British parliamentary election results 1918–1949 (3rd ed.). Chichester: Parliamentary Research Services. ISBN 0-900178-06-X.
- Leigh Rayment's Peerage Pages

Parliament of the United Kingdom
Preceded by Albert Stanley	Member of Parliament for Ashton-under-Lyne; 1920–1924	Succeeded by Cornelius Homan
Preceded by Hugh Mowbray Meyler	Member of Parliament for Blackpool; 1924–1931	Succeeded by Clifford Erskine-Bolst
