= Robert Sheldon, Baron Sheldon =

British politician (1923–2020)

The Right Honourable The Lord Sheldon PC

Financial Secretary to the Treasury
- In office 17 June 1975 – 4 May 1979
- Prime Minister: Harold Wilson; James Callaghan
- Preceded by: John Gilbert
- Succeeded by: Nigel Lawson

Minister of State for the Treasury
- In office 18 October 1974 – 17 June 1975
- Prime Minister: Harold Wilson
- Preceded by: John Nott
- Succeeded by: Denzil Davies

Minister of State for the Civil Service Department
- In office 7 April 1974 – 18 October 1974
- Prime Minister: Harold Wilson
- Preceded by: Kenneth Baker; Geoffrey Johnson-Smith
- Succeeded by: Charles Morris

Member of the House of Lords
- Lord Temporal
- Life peerage 22 June 2001 – 18 May 2015

Member of Parliament for Ashton under Lyne
- In office 15 October 1964 – 14 May 2001
- Preceded by: Hervey Rhodes
- Succeeded by: David Heyes

Personal details
- Born: Isaac Ezra Shamash; 13 September 1923 Manchester, England
- Died: 2 February 2020 (aged 96)
- Party: Labour (from 1945)
- Spouses: Eileen Shamash (m. 1945; died 1969) Mary Sheldon (m. 1971)
- Relations: Gerald Shamash (first cousin)
- Children: 2

Robert Edward Sheldon, Baron Sheldon PC (born Isaac Ezra Shamash; 13 September 1923 – 2 February 2020) was a British Labour Party politician and life peer who served as Member of Parliament (MP) for Ashton under Lyne from 1964 to 2001.

== Early life and career ==
Isaac Ezra Shamash was born in Manchester to a family of Jewish immigrants from Iraq. His parents were Jack, a textile exporter, and Betty Shamash. His family always called him Bobby and so he changed his name by deed poll in 1943.

Sheldon was privately educated at Latymer Upper School, trained in engineering at Burnley and Stockport technical colleges, and awarded an external degree from the University of London. He joined the Labour Party in 1945 and later served as a Manchester City Councillor. Sheldon worked as director of his family textile firm.

== Political career ==
Sheldon first stood for Parliament in Manchester Withington at the 1959 general election and was elected as MP for Ashton under Lyne at the 1964 general election a post he held until 2001.

He was one of the four directors of the Left Wing Coffee House from 1959 to 1963 in Manchester as well as Joel Barnett, and Edmund Dell, in addition to the chief funder, Harold Lever. By early 1976, all four of these men would be serving as government ministers together, working directly alongside Chancellor Healey.

Sheldon caused difficulty for the first Wilson government in his support for devaluation of the pound, which the Prime Minister and Chancellor strongly opposed. When Chancellor James Callaghan refused to answer his question on the issue in Parliament, there was a run on the pound.

He was also staunchly pro-EU, supporting Britain's entry into the European Common Market and later advocating for membership of the European Monetary Union. Sheldon was known for his association with fellow MPs Joel Barnett and Edmund Dell, the three of whom met in Manchester during their youth.

He briefly served as Civil Service Minister after Labour returned to power in 1974 but was appointed as a Treasury Minister later in the same year. Sheldon was promoted to Financial Secretary to the Treasury from 1975 to 1979 and was made a Privy Counsellor in 1977.

He served as Shadow Chief Secretary to the Treasury from 1981 until 1983, when he became Chair of the Public Accounts Committee (PAC). In his final term in the House of Commons, Sheldon stepped down from the PAC to chair both the Liaison Committee and Standards and Privileges Committee.

He stood down from the Commons at the 2001 general election, and was created a life peer as Baron Sheldon, of Ashton-under-Lyne in the County of Greater Manchester, on 22 June 2001. Sheldon retired from the House of Lords on 18 May 2015.

== Personal life and death ==
Sheldon married his first cousin Eileen Shamash in 1945, with whom he had a son and daughter. Eileen died in 1969 and he married again to Mary Shield in 1971. His daughter, Gillian Sargeant, later became a Labour Councillor on Barnet London Borough Council.

In 2000, he collapsed on the street of a heart attack and was resuscitated by a passer-by, who happened to be former Olympic swimmer Duncan Goodhew. He died from a subsequent heart attack on 2 February 2020, aged 96.

Parliament of the United Kingdom
Preceded by Hervey Rhodes	Member of Parliament for Ashton under Lyne; 1964–2001	Succeeded by David Heyes
Political offices
Preceded by John Gilbert	Financial Secretary to the Treasury; 1975–1979	Succeeded by Nigel Lawson
