= 1920 Ashton-under-Lyne by-election =

UK parliamentary by-election

- 31 January 1920
- Turnout: 82.3%

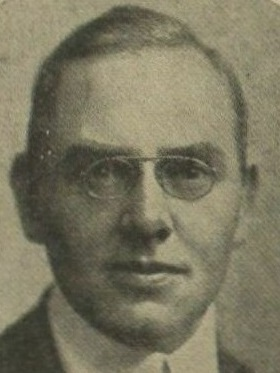
Candidate	Walter de Frece	William Robinson	Arthur Marshall
Party	Unionist	Labour	Liberal
Alliance	Coalition
Popular vote	8,864	8,127	3,511
Percentage	43.3%	39.6%	17.1%
Swing	▼15.0%	New	New
MP before election
Albert Stanley
Subsequent MP
Walter de Frece
Unionist

The 1920 Ashton-under-Lyne by-election was a by-election held on 31 January 1920 for the British House of Commons constituency of Ashton-under-Lyne.

The by-election was triggered by the elevation to the peerage of the town's Conservative Party Member of Parliament (MP) Albert Stanley, who was ennobled as Baron Ashfield.

The result was a victory for the Conservative candidate Sir Walter de Frece, who held the seat with a massively reduced majority.

British Pathe has a newsreel clip of Sir Walter de Frece campaigning in the by-election with his wife Vesta Tilley.

== Result ==
Ashton-under-Lyne by-election, 1920
Party		Candidate	Votes	%	±%
C	Unionist	Walter de Frece	8,864	43.3	−15.0
	Labour	William Robinson	8,127	39.6	New
	Liberal	Arthur Marshall	3,511	17.1	New
Majority			738	3.7	−12.9
Turnout			20,502	82.3	+13.9
	Unionist hold		Swing		
C indicates candidate endorsed by the coalition government.

== See also ==
- Ashton-under-Lyne constituency
- 1928 Ashton-under-Lyne by-election
- 1931 Ashton-under-Lyne by-election
- 1939 Ashton-under-Lyne by-election
- 1945 Ashton-under-Lyne by-election
- List of United Kingdom by-elections (1918–1931)
