= John William Gordon (trade unionist) =

Irish trade union official and political activist

John William Gordon (born 1879) was an Irish trade union official and political activist.

Born in Dublin to a Catholic family, Gordon came to Britain to work on the Great Western Railway, and joined the National Union of Railwaymen. He became correspondence secretary of the union's Paddington No.1 branch in 1907, then branch secretary in 1912. He studied in the evenings at the Regent Street Polytechnic, then at the London School of Economics, and his skill with figures enabled him to work full-time for the union as its cashier, and he was later promoted to become its chief accountant.

In his spare time, Gordon was active in the co-operative movement, and was president of the North West London Co-operative Society when it merged into the London Co-operative Society. He was the founding secretary of the Wembley Divisional Labour Party, and later served as president of the Paddington Labour Party and Trades Council. He also served as a magistrate.

Gordon was sponsored by the union as a Labour Party candidate in Paddington North at the 1923, 1924 and 1929 United Kingdom general elections. Although he took second place on each occasion, by 1929 he was only 528 votes behind the victor.

Gordon was selected to stand in the 1931 Ashton-under-Lyne by-election, and took a close second place. He stood again in the 1931 United Kingdom general election, his vote falling back slightly.
