= Vesta Tilley =

English music hall performer and male impersonator (1864–1952)

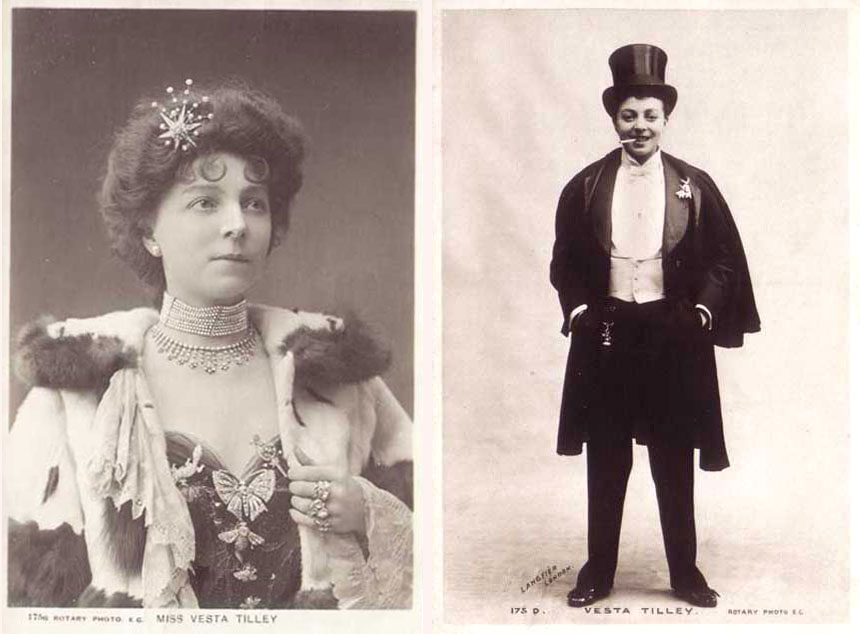
- Cards of Tilley, performing in drag on the right
- Born: Matilda Alice Powles; 13 May 1864; Worcester, England
- Died: 16 September 1952 (aged 88); St James's, London, England
- Other name: Lady de Frece
- Occupations: Music hall singer; male impersonator; principal boy
- Spouse: Walter de Frece (m. 1890; died 1935)

Matilda Alice Powles, Lady de Frece (13 May 1864 – 16 September 1952) was an English music hall performer. She adopted the stage name Vesta Tilley and became one of the best-known male impersonators of her era. Her career lasted from 1869 until 1920. Starting in provincial theatres with her father as manager, she performed her first season in London in 1874. She typically performed as a dandy or fop, also playing other roles. She found additional success as a principal boy in pantomime.

By the 1890s, Tilley was England's highest earning woman. She was also a star in the vaudeville circuit in the United States, touring a total of six times. She married Walter de Frece, a theatre impresario who became her new manager and songwriter. At a Royal Command Performance in 1912, she scandalised Queen Mary because she was wearing trousers. During the First World War she was known as "England’s greatest recruiting sergeant" since she sang patriotic songs dressed in khaki fatigues like a soldier and promoted enlistment drives.

Becoming Lady de Frece in 1919, she decided to retire and made a year-long farewell tour from which all profits went to children's hospitals. Her last performance was in 1920 at the Coliseum Theatre, London. She then supported her husband when he became a Member of Parliament and later retired with him to Monte Carlo. She died in 1952 on a visit to London and is buried at Putney Vale Cemetery. Her life story was commemorated in the 1957 film After the Ball.

== Early years ==
"It's part of a policeman's duty" by Vesta Tilley in 1907

"I'm the idol of the girls" by Vesta Tilley in 1908

"Following a fellow with a face like me" by Vesta Tilley in 1908

Matilda Alice Powles was born at Beaver Row, Worcester on 13 May 1864. She was the second child out of a total of thirteen and shared her first name with her mother Matilda Powles (née Broughton). Her father was William Henry Powles, known as Harry Ball. He was a musician and comic who in 1870 became manager and master of ceremonies at the Star Music Hall, Gloucester. In 1872 he moved his family from Worcester to become manager of St George's Hall in Nottingham and to develop and manage seven year old Tilley's life as a performer.

With her father's encouragement, she first appeared on stage at the age of three and, by six, she was appearing to sing songs dressed as a man. Known variously to begin as Tilley Ball or Little Tilley, she embarked on her professional career in 1869 and was to be on the stage until 1920. Her first character of note was "Pocket Sims Reeves", spoofing the act of the then-famous opera singer Sims Reeves by performing his songs such as "The Anchor's Weighed". She would later perform male roles exclusively, saying that "I felt that I could express myself better if I were dressed as a boy."

At the time, British music hall entertainment was increasingly popular and Powles' fame grew as she became older. By 1872, her father had quit his job to manage her career full-time and she was supporting her family. In 1874, she did her first season in London, performing as the Great Little Tilley at three venues every night. Edward Villiers, then manager at the Canterbury Music Hall in Lambeth, was concerned by the gender ambiguity of the performance name and suggested a change. Harry Ball decided upon Vesta Tilley. "Vesta" referred to both the Latin word for virgin and Swan Vesta, a brand of safety matches; "Tilley" was a diminutive of her name Matilda. She was billed as Vesta Tilley for the first time in April 1878, when performing at the Royal Music Hall in Holborn, London.

== Stardom ==
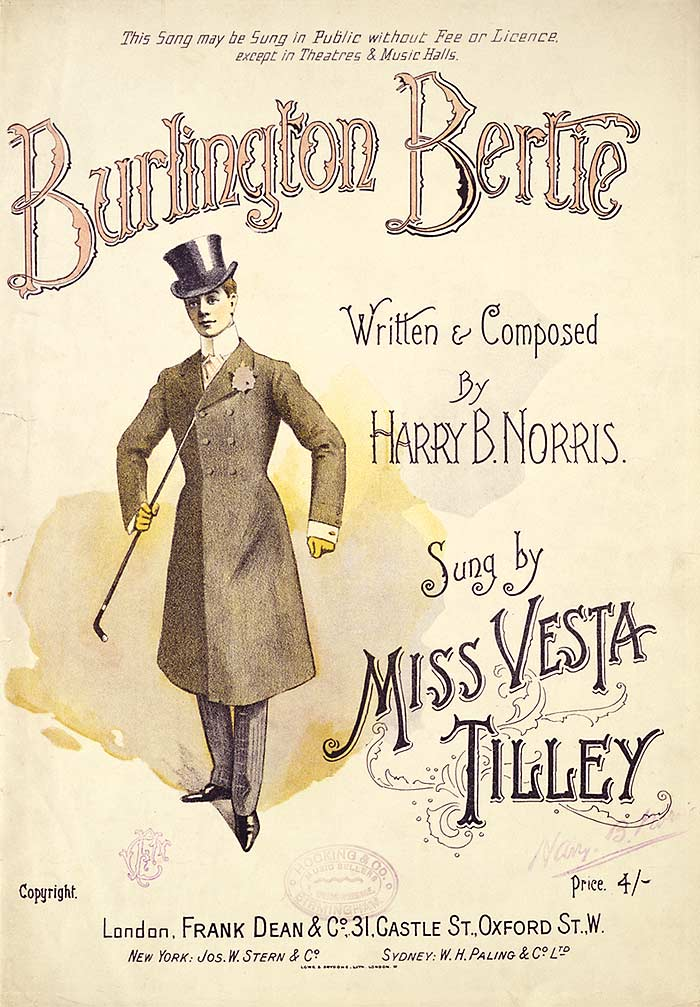
Poster for Vesta Tilley performing as Burlington Bertie

Vesta Tilley performing as a principal boy

Tilley's success continued into the 1880s and she was able to command ever higher fees for her performances. As a male impersonator, she typically performed as a dandy or a fop, a famous character being "Burlington Bertie" although she also played other roles such as policemen and clergymen.

By the 1890s, she was known as "the London Idol" and adored by her fans. Her father had died in 1888 and two years later she married Walter de Frece, a theatre impresario who owned music halls across Great Britain. Frece became her new manager and also began to write her songs. She toured extensively in Britain and also played the vaudeville circuit in the United States on six separate visits. She had become the highest-earning woman in England. One theatre in the US offered her a salary of $600 per week.

Tilley was known for her painstaking attention to detail in preparing for her roles: she wore her hair tightly plaited and hidden under a wig; she took to wearing men's underwear so her appearance looked believable, since contemporary women's underclothing would have distorted her shape. Her performances were always family-friendly, unlike other acts. She had found her niche performing as a male impersonator, and working-class men adored her mockery of the upper classes. From the 1870s onwards, women also went to music halls and they revelled in Tilley's independence. By 1912, music hall entertainments had become so famous that a Royal Command Performance was organised. Tilley sang a favourite song, "The Piccadilly Johnny with the Little Glass Eye" wearing trousers as part of her act. Queen Mary was scandalised to see a woman's legs and hid her face behind a programme.

Alongside other stars such as Dan Leno and Ada Reeve, Tilley made some of the first sound recordings in England in 1898. She also played the principal boy in a number of pantomimes. At the age of 13, she played Robinson Crusoe at the New Theatre Royal in Portsmouth. She was best known for her titular role in Dick Whittington, which she played many times. She often performed in male roles in pantomimes such as Beauty and the Beast and Sinbad the Sailor, and occasionally played female parts, such as the Queen of Hearts at the Theatre Royal, Brighton.

== Wartime work ==
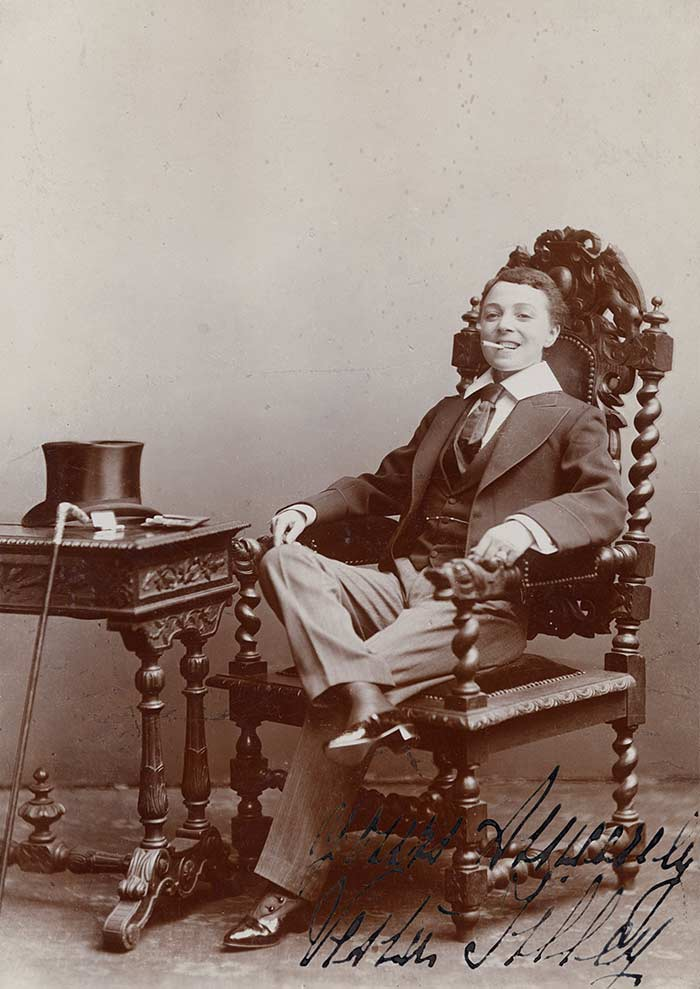
Publicity photograph of Vesta Tilley dressed as a foppish young man

By the time the First World War began, Tilley's career was slowing down and the changing situation provided a chance for it to develop further. She and her husband ran military recruitment drives and she sang at charity events. Tilley dressed in khaki fatigues and performed numbers written by her husband such as "Jolly Good Luck to the Girl Who Loves a Soldier", "The Army of Today's All Right", "Six Days' Leave", and "Your King and Country Want You" (also known as "We Don't Want to Lose You but We Think You Ought to Go"). She was nicknamed "England’s greatest recruiting sergeant" since young men were sometimes asked to join the army during her show. Over the course of a week in Hackney, she enlisted so many people they became known as "The Vesta Tilley Platoon".

However, Tilley was also prepared to question the carnage of war. In "I'm Glad I've Got a Bit of a Blighty One", she sang about a soldier who was delighted to have been wounded in battle because it would allow him to go back to England (Blighty).

When I think about my dugout
Where I dare not stick my mug out
I'm glad I've got a bit of a blighty one!

— "I'm Glad I've Got a Bit of a Blighty One"

== Retirement ==
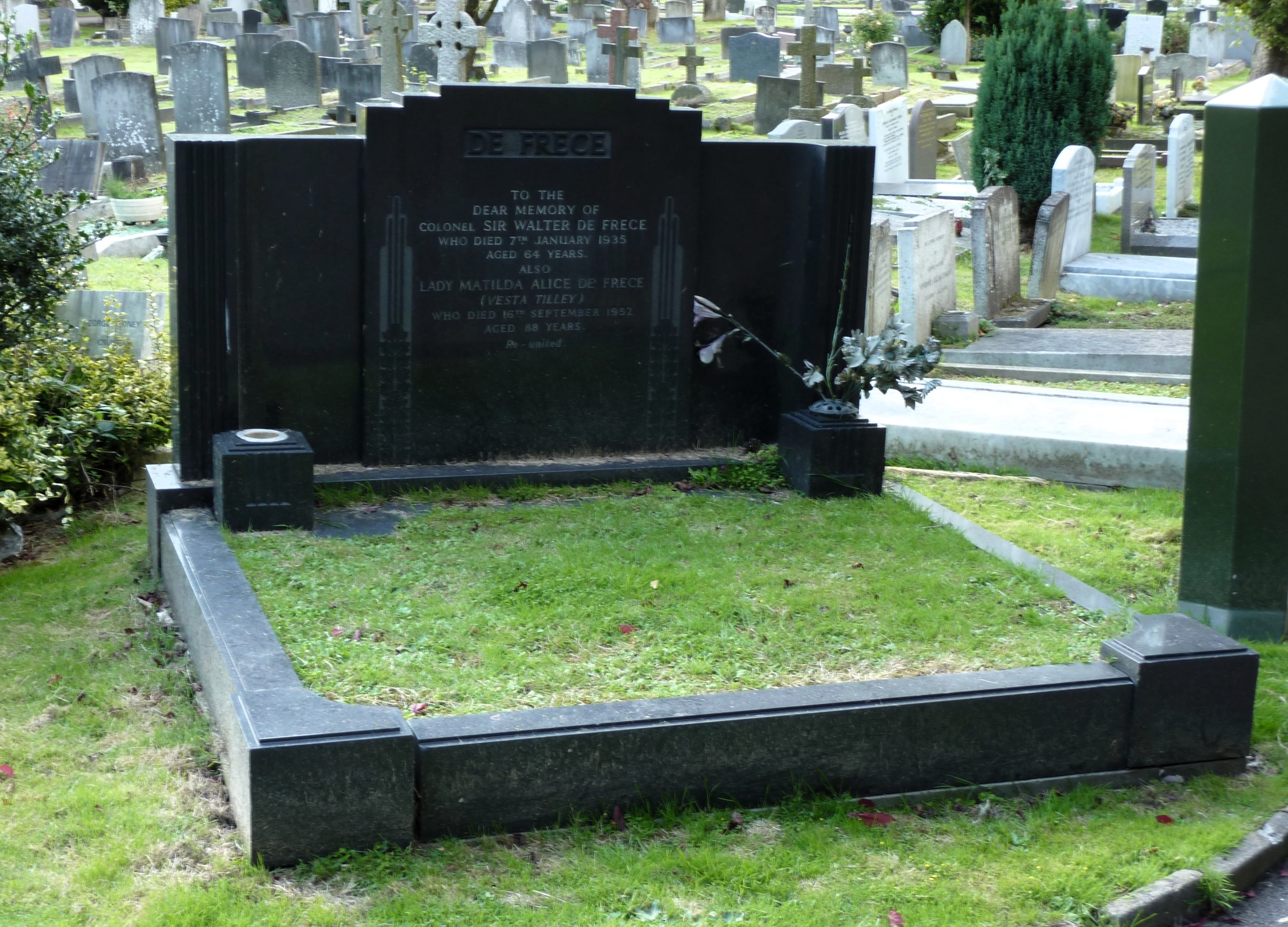
Grave of Vesta Tilley and her husband Walter de Frece at Putney Vale Cemetery, London in 2014

After the war, music halls declined in popularity. Walter de Frece was knighted in the 1919 King's Birthday Honours List for his services to the war effort, with Tilley becoming Lady de Frece. De Frece decided to stand for Parliament and Tilley chose to end her stage career. Her farewell tour took a year to complete, between 1919 and 1920. All proceeds were given to a local children's hospital. She made her final appearance at the Coliseum Theatre, London on Saturday 5 June 1920 (at the age of 56). In its review, The Times called it a "wonderful night" and commented that at the end she was "gradually being submerged under the continuous stream of bouquets".

Walter de Frece became a Conservative Member of Parliament (MP), first for Ashton-under-Lyne and later for Blackpool. In 1923, Tilley was presented at the royal court as Lady de Frece. Her husband served as an MP until 1931 and then the couple moved to Monte Carlo for their retirement. Her autobiography, Recollections of Vesta Tilley, was published in 1934. After her husband died in 1935, Vesta Tilley continued to live in Monte Carlo.

Tilley died in St James's, London while visiting on 16 September 1952, aged 88. Her body was buried alongside her husband, at Putney Vale Cemetery. Her life story was commemorated in the 1957 film After the Ball.
