= 1931 Ashton-under-Lyne by-election =

UK parliamentary by-election

The 1931 Ashton-Under-Lyne by-election was held on 30 April. It was triggered by the death of the town's Labour MP, Albert Bellamy, and resulted in a victory for the Conservative candidate, Col John Broadbent.

This was the first election contested by Oswald Mosley's New Party, which had only been formed on 1 March that year after Mosley had resigned from the Labour Party. The furious crowd on the market ground by the town hall shouted down Mosley as he tried to speak after the declaration, calling him a traitor and blaming him for Labour's defeat. He is reputed to have said to his aide, John Strachey: "That is the crowd that has prevented anyone doing anything in England since the (First World) War." Strachey believed that it was at that point that British fascism was born.

Mosley had been seriously ill with pleurisy and pneumonia, preventing him from taking part in the campaign until its last week. During the campaign there were huge crowds to hear Mosley's wife, Lady Cynthia, speak. However, the Ashton Reporter felt that these were artificially swelled by the many girls who wanted to admire the clothes worn by the glamorous Lady Cynthia.

The Labour Party hoped to hold the seat, and narrowed its choice of possible candidates to two: Stan Awbery, an activist in the Transport and General Workers' Union, based in Wales, and John William Gordon, an Irish-born Catholic who was chief accountant of the National Union of Railwaymen. Concerns that the substantial number of Catholics in the seat might have become disillusioned with the party led to the selection of Gordon to contest the seat.

== Result ==
Ashton-under-Lyne by-election, 1931
Party	Candidate	Votes	%	±%
Conservative	John Broadbent	12,420	44.6	+11.6
Labour	John William Gordon	11,005	39.4	−5.0
New Party	Allan Young	4,472	16.0	New
Majority		1,415	5.2	N/A
Turnout		27,897	80.2	−5.7
Conservative gain from Labour		Swing	+8.3	

== See also ==
- List of United Kingdom by-elections
- Ashton-under-Lyne constituency
- 1920 Ashton-under-Lyne by-election
- 1928 Ashton-under-Lyne by-election
- 1939 Ashton-under-Lyne by-election
- 1945 Ashton-under-Lyne by-election
