= 1939 Ashton-under-Lyne by-election =

UK parliamentary by-election

The 1939 Ashton-under-Lyne by-election was a by-election held for the British House of Commons constituency of Ashton-under-Lyne on 28 October 1939. The seat had become vacant on the death of the Labour Member of Parliament Fred Simpson, who had held the seat since the 1935 general election.

The Labour candidate, William Jowitt, was returned unopposed. He represented the constituency until he was elevated to the peerage as Earl Jowitt shortly after the 1945 general election.

== See also ==
- Ashton-under-Lyne (UK Parliament constituency)
- 1920 Ashton-under-Lyne by-election
- 1928 Ashton-under-Lyne by-election
- 1931 Ashton-under-Lyne by-election
- 1945 Ashton-under-Lyne by-election
- List of United Kingdom by-elections
