= 1945 Ashton-under-Lyne by-election =

UK parliamentary by-election

The 1945 Ashton-under-Lyne by-election was a by-election held on 2 October 1945 for the British House of Commons constituency of Ashton-under-Lyne.

The by-election was triggered by the elevation to the peerage of the town's Labour Party Member of Parliament (MP) William Jowitt, who was ennobled as Baron Jowitt.

The result was a victory for the Labour candidate Hervey Rhodes, who held the seat with 54% of the votes, and a swing in the Labour Party's direction.

== Result ==
Ashton-under-Lyne by-election, 1945
| Party | Candidate | Votes | % | ±% |
|---|---|---|---|---|
| Labour | Hervey Rhodes | 12,889 | 54.1 | −2.3 |
| Conservative | Robert Cary | 8,360 | 35.0 | −8.6 |
| Liberal | Alter Beale | 2,604 | 10.9 | New |
| Majority | | 4,529 | 19.1 | +6.3 |
| Turnout | | 23,853 | 70.5 | +8.1 |
| Labour hold | | Swing | +3.2 | |

== See also ==
- List of United Kingdom by-elections
- Ashton-under-Lyne constituency
- 1920 Ashton-under-Lyne by-election
- 1928 Ashton-under-Lyne by-election
- 1931 Ashton-under-Lyne by-election
- 1939 Ashton-under-Lyne by-election
