= 1928 Ashton-under-Lyne by-election =

1928 election in Great Britain

← 1924	29 October 1928	1929 →

	First party	Second party	Third party
Candidate	Albert Bellamy	Gordon Touche	William G. Greenwood
Party	Labour	Unionist	Liberal
Popular vote	9,567	7,161	6,874
Percentage	40.6%	30.3%	29.1%
Swing	▲7.8%	▼9.2%	▲1.4%
MP before election
Cornelius Homan
Unionist
Subsequent MP
Albert Bellamy
Labour

The 1928 Ashton-under-Lyne by-election was held on 29 October 1928. It was notable for having the highest turnout of any Parliamentary by-election in Great Britain.

The election was caused by the bankruptcy of Conservative Party Member of Parliament for Ashton-under-Lyne Cornelius Homan. Although Homan had only represented the constituency since the 1924 general election, Ashton had been represented by Conservatives for many years, and Labour had never taken the seat. However, the Conservatives had never achieved a large majority in the seat, and as both Labour and the Liberal Party had gained several seats in recent by-elections, it was thought that both would mount a strong challenge. As a result, interest in the by-election was high.

Labour stood Albert Bellamy, while the Conservatives stood Gordon Touche, and the Liberals put up William Gilbert Greenwood, an accountant.

== Result ==
The Mayor of Ashton arranged for coloured rockets to be fired from the roof of the town hall when the result was announced, the colour to correspond to that of the winning party. After the fastest ever count – a record which stands to the present day, he did so. This led to some confusion, as their colour was not obvious to all observers, but it soon became apparent that they were yellow – the local Labour Party colour.

Most unusually, the turnout for the by-election was higher than that for the previous general election in the seat, at 89.1% of the electorate. The Liberals picked up a few votes, but Labour gained many more, at the expense of the Conservatives who only just avoided falling into third place.

Bellamy held the seat in the 1929 general election, but he died in 1931, precipitating another by-election, won by the Conservatives. Labour won the seat back in 1935 and have held it ever since. Touche took the safe Conservative constituency of Reigate in 1931, and remained an MP for many years.

Ashton-under-Lyne by-election, 1928
Party	Candidate	Votes	%	±%
Labour	Albert Bellamy	9,567	40.6	+7.8
Conservative	Gordon Touche	7,161	30.3	−9.2
Liberal	William Gilbert Greenwood	6,874	29.1	+1.4
Majority		2,406	10.3	N/A
Turnout		23,602	89.1	+0.8
Labour gain from Conservative		Swing	+8.5	

== See also ==
- Ashton-under-Lyne (UK Parliament constituency)
- 1920 Ashton-under-Lyne by-election
- 1931 Ashton-under-Lyne by-election
- 1939 Ashton-under-Lyne by-election
- 1945 Ashton-under-Lyne by-election
- List of United Kingdom by-elections (1918–1931)
