= 1908 Pudsey by-election =

UK parliamentary by-election

The 1908 Pudsey by-election was a Parliamentary by-election held on 20 June 1908. The constituency returned one Member of Parliament (MP) to the House of Commons of the United Kingdom, elected by the first past the post voting system.

The by-election was caused when the Member of Parliament, the George Whiteley resigned from Parliament by accepting appointment as Steward of the Manor of Northstead.

== Electoral history ==
General election Saturday 20 January 1906 Electorate
Party	Candidate	Votes	%	±%
Liberal	George Whiteley	7,043	66.5	+14.1
Conservative	C W Ford	3,541	33.5	−14.1
Majority		3,502	33.0	+28.2
Turnout		15,909	66.5	−11.7
Liberal hold		Swing	+14.1	

== Candidates ==
Frederick Ogden, John James Oddy and J. W. Benson were the three candidates. Eccentric poet Arthur Hunnable announced that he would contest the election, but failed to submit nomination papers.

== Campaign ==
Polling Day was arranged for 20 June 1908, just 18 days after the retirement of the previous MP.

== Result ==
1908 Pudsey by-election Electorate
Party	Candidate	Votes	%	±%
Conservative	John James Oddy	5,444	45.1	+11.7
Liberal	Frederick Ogden	5,331	44.2	−22.4
Independent Labour	J. W. Benson	1,291	10.7	New
Majority		113	0.9	N/A
Turnout		12066	78.3	+11.8
Conservative gain from Liberal		Swing	+17.0	

== Aftermath ==
On 26 June, it was announced that Whiteley, the former MP, had been awarded a peerage and would take a seat in the House of Lords.
