= Huntington-Whiteley baronets =

Baronetcy in the Baronetage of the United Kingdom

The Huntington-Whiteley Baronetcy, of Grimley in the County of Worcester, is a title in the Baronetage of the United Kingdom. It was created on 8 February 1918 for Herbert Huntington-Whiteley, Conservative Member of Parliament for Droitwich.

George Whiteley, 1st Baron Marchamley, was the elder brother of the first Baronet. The 2nd Baronet married Lady Margaret Baldwin, daughter of the Conservative Prime Minister Stanley Baldwin, 1st Earl Baldwin of Bewdley.

== Huntington-Whiteley baronets, of Grimley (1918) ==
- Sir Herbert Huntington-Whiteley, 1st Baronet (1857–1936)
  - Sir Herbert Maurice Huntington-Whiteley, 2nd Baronet (1896–1975)
    - Sir Hugo Baldwin Huntington-Whiteley, 3rd Baronet (1924–2014)
    - Sir John Miles Huntington-Whiteley VRD, 4th Baronet (1929–2019) married 1960 Countess Victoria zu Castell-Rudenhausen, a great-great-granddaughter of Queen Victoria.
      - Sir Leopold Maurice Huntington-Whiteley, 5th Baronet (born 1965)

The heir presumptive is the present holder's cousin, Charles Andrew Huntington-Whiteley (born 1957). He is the father of the actress and model Rosie Huntington-Whiteley. His heir apparent is his son Toby Charles Huntington-Whiteley (born 1989).

== See also ==
- Baron Marchamley
