= Baron Marchamley =

Barony in the Peerage of the United Kingdom

Baron Marchamley, of Hawkestone in the County of Salop, is a title in the Peerage of the United Kingdom. It was created in 1908 for the Liberal politician George Whiteley, who had previously represented Stockport and Pudsey in the House of Commons. As of 2014 the title is held by his great-grandson, the fourth Baron, who succeeded his father in 1994.

The Conservative politician Sir Herbert Huntington-Whiteley, 1st Baronet, was the younger brother of the first Baron.

== Barons Marchamley (1908) ==
- George Whiteley, 1st Baron Marchamley (1855–1925)
- William Tattersall Whiteley, 2nd Baron Marchamley (1886–1949)
- John William Tattersall Whiteley, 3rd Baron Marchamley (1922–1994)
- William Francis Whiteley, 4th Baron Marchamley (b. 1968)

The heir apparent is the present holder's son, the Hon. Leon Whiteley (b. 2004)

== Arms ==
Coat of arms of Baron Marchamley
Crest A stag’s head couped Argent attired Or holding in the mouth a bell Gold. Escutcheon Per fesse dancettée Sable and Gules in chief a pale Or thereon three bars of the second in base a fleur de lis Argent. Supporters Dexter a griffin sejant sinister a hawk both per fess Gules and Sable armed and membered Or each charged on the fesse line with a fleur-de-lis Argent. Motto Live To Live

== See also ==
- Huntington-Whiteley baronets
