= Rosie Huntington-Whiteley =

British model (born 1987)

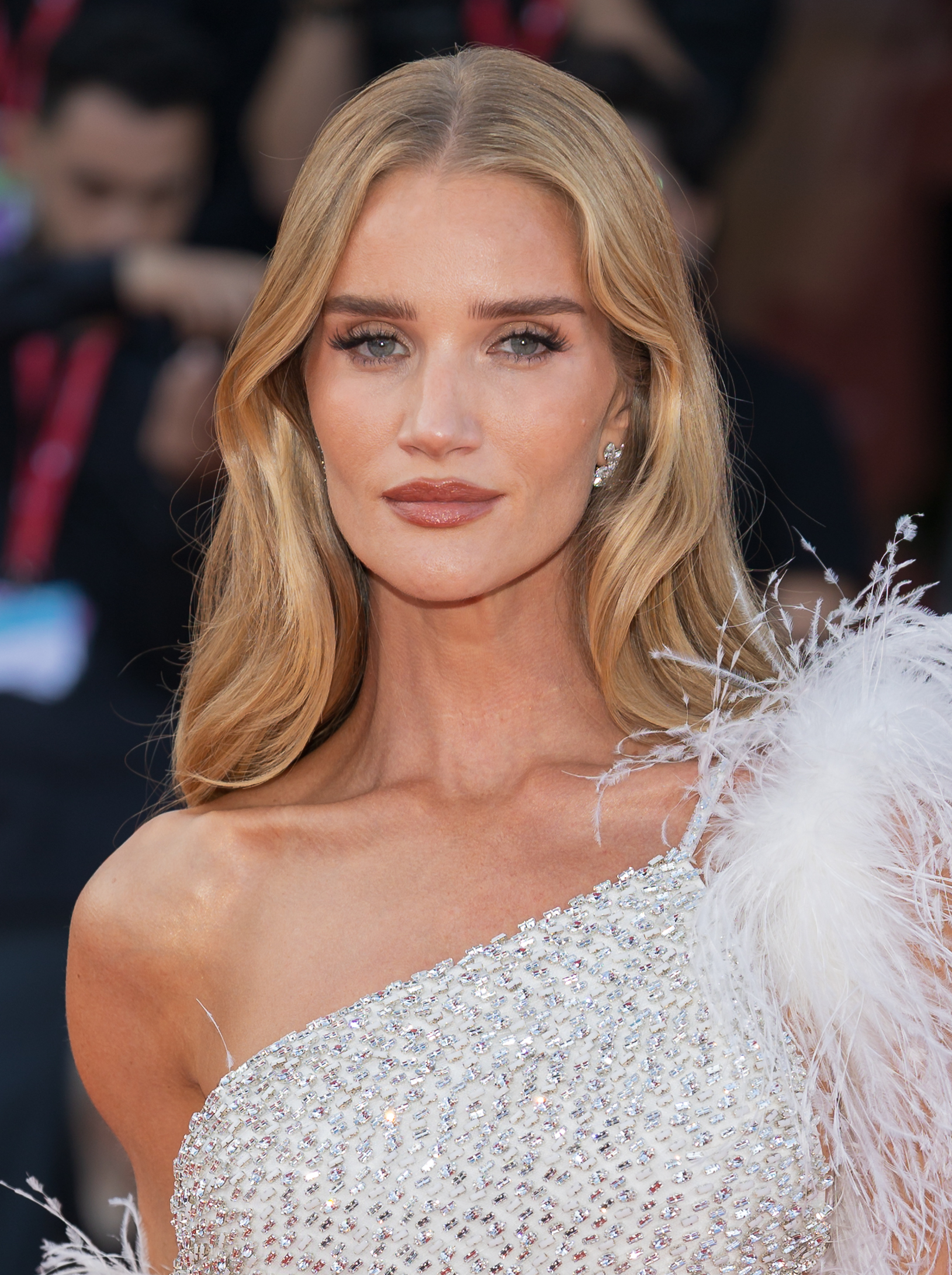
- Huntington-Whiteley in 2025
- Born: Rosie Alice Huntington-Whiteley; 18 April 1987 (age 39); Plymouth, Devon, England
- Occupation: Model
- Years active: 2002–present
- Partner(s): Jason Statham (2010–present; engaged)
- Children: 2
- Modeling information
- Height: 5 ft 9 in (1.75 m)
- Agency: Creative Artists Agency (New York, Los Angeles)

Rosie Alice Huntington-Whiteley (born 18 April 1987) is an English model. She is best known for her work for lingerie retailer Victoria's Secret, formerly being one of their brand "Angels". She is also known for being the face of Burberry's 2011 brand fragrance Burberry Body, her work with Marks & Spencer, and her artistic collaboration with denim-focused fashion brand Paige. She also had acting roles in Transformers: Dark of the Moon (2011) and Mad Max: Fury Road (2015).

== Early life ==
Huntington-Whiteley was born in Plymouth, Devon, England, where she was raised on a farm near Tavistock, Devon. She is the daughter of Charles Andrew Huntington-Whiteley, a chartered surveyor, and fitness instructor, Fiona Yvonne, daughter of Alan Jackson of Buckinghamshire. She has two younger siblings, a brother and a sister. Her paternal great-grandfather, Wing-Commander Eric Huntington-Whiteley, JP, was the nephew of George Whiteley, 1st Baron Marchamley and the younger son of politician Sir Herbert Huntington-Whiteley, 1st Baronet. Eric's wife, Rosie's great-grandmother, Enid Etta Cohn, was from a family of Polish Jews who emigrated to England in the 1870s. Rosie's paternal grandmother, Gillian, also from a Jewish family, was the daughter of surgeon Jacob Franks, of West Chiltington, Sussex.

Educated at Tavistock College, Huntington-Whiteley later revealed that she was bullied and teased at school for having a double-barrelled name, small breasts and full lips.

== Career ==
As a 14-year-old student, Huntington-Whiteley began working at London West End–based model agency Profile, before taking her GCSEs. Summer 2003, at age 16, she left school for her first modeling job, a Levi's jeans commercial. Huntington-Whiteley's big break came in January 2004 when she travelled to New York City for a shoot with Teen Vogue. She later made her catwalk debut alongside Naomi Campbell in New York City in Spring 2004, and was then photographed by Bruce Weber for Abercrombie & Fitch.

In early 2006, she was signed to American lingerie brand Victoria's Secret, making her debut at the brand's fashion show in Los Angeles.

Huntington-Whiteley remained unknown outside the fashion industry until 2008, when she was cast by chief creative director Christopher Bailey, replacing Agyness Deyn for Burberry's Autumn/Winter campaign with actor Sam Riley. She got her first British Vogue cover on the November 2008 issue, alongside Eden Clark and Jourdan Dunn in a feature celebrating British models. The following year, she was featured as the face of Karen Millen's Spring/Summer 2009 advertising campaign. She also starred in a short film for Agent Provocateur lingerie, playing a woman whose boyfriend forgets Valentine's Day.

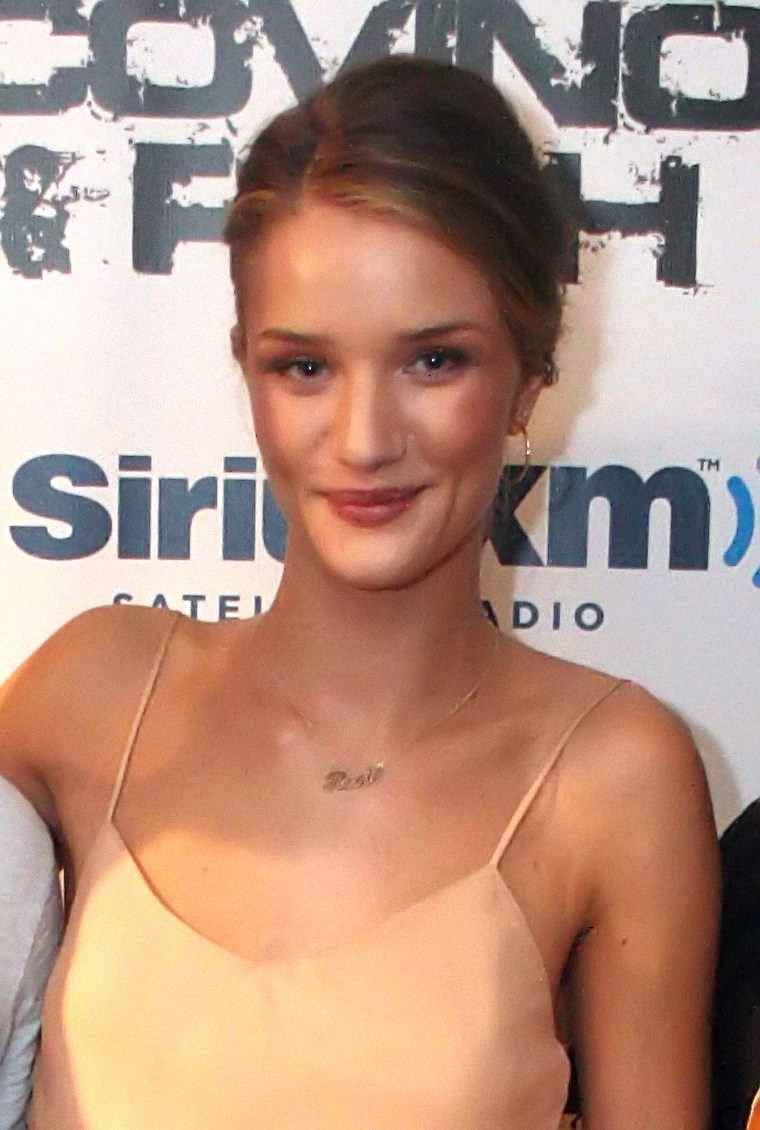
Huntington-Whiteley in 2011

For Fall/Winter 2009, she modelled in campaigns for Godiva and Miss Sixty. In February 2010, Huntington-Whiteley officially became a Victoria's Secret Angel and took part in the annual Victoria's Secret Fashion Show in New York City. She confirmed the following year that she wouldn't walk the show, and has since stated that she left Victoria's Secret to pursue other opportunities, as she was "well aware of the short shelf-life a model has".

In 2010, she posed nude for the Pirelli Calendar, which was photographed by Terry Richardson. Huntington-Whiteley hit the runway for designers Prada in Milan and Giles Deacon in Paris. For SS10 her advertising campaigns included Monsoon's first underwear line, Thomas Wylde, Full Circle, and VS Online. In March, she collaborated with VOGUE.COM to share her outfit choices daily for the Today I'm Wearing feature. She appeared on the covers of the May 2010 issues of Harper's Bazaar Russia and GQ UK. She was featured on the cover of LOVE Magazine's September issue, styled as a pinup girl. For FW10 she modelled for Burberry as well as the company's first beauty line; and her other advertising campaigns included Thomas Wylde and Leon Max.

In May 2010, it was announced that Huntington-Whiteley would become the new female lead in Transformers: Dark of the Moon, released 29 June 2011, replacing Megan Fox. She had previously worked with the film's director, Michael Bay, on a Victoria's Secret commercial. MTV Networks' NextMovie.com named her one of the "Breakout Stars to Watch for in 2011". Prior to the film's release, she won the "Female Star of Tomorrow" award at the 2011 CinemaCon Awards. Reviewers were critical of both Huntington-Whiteley's and co-star Shia LaBeouf's acting. Peter Travers (of Wenner Media) stated the two "couldn't be duller". Jason Solomons of The Observer wrote that "we're first introduced to Rosie via a close-up of her bum, segueing straight from the film's opening sequence and titles on to the pert buttocks and underwear of our heroine", and that Huntington-Whiteley's English posh girl accent "renders her practically unintelligible when surrounded by American accents and falling masonry". In a positive review, Drew McWeeny of HitFix said, "She reminds me of Cameron Diaz in The Mask, an actress who doesn't really show off any range, but who gives a natural, winning performance and who is up to the challenge of this particular picture."

Fashion photographer Rankin devoted a book entirely to her entitled Ten Times Rosie. Rankin opined that Huntington-Whiteley brought something different to modelling: "We've been looking at very, very skinny, almost masculine girls for a long time. [Rosie] really is the model of the moment. She's the actress of the moment. She's definitely going to become something much, much bigger." Celebrity make-up artist Ruby Hammer, who has worked with Huntington-Whiteley for years, described her as the "quintessential" English rose.

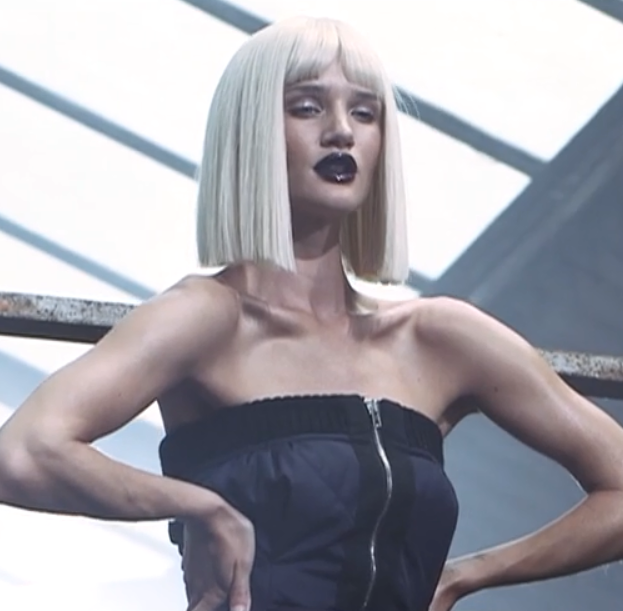
Huntington-Whiteley for Elle magazine in 2013

In March 2011, Huntington-Whiteley landed her first solo British Vogue cover and appeared on the covers of the UK's July issues of Elle and GQ. She was unveiled as the face of Burberry's newest fragrance, Burberry Body, in July 2011. In 2013, Huntington-Whiteley starred alongside Helena Bonham Carter and David Gandy in the Marks & Spencer Christmas advert. She was also announced as the face of Australian cosmetics brand ModelCo. In 2014, PAIGE announced Huntington-Whiteley as their ambassador for their upcoming Spring 2015 ad campaign. In February 2017, PAIGE launched their first ever design collaboration with Huntington-Whiteley on a 17 piece capsule collection for Spring called Rosie HW x PAIGE. This was followed by a Fall collection consisting of 20 pieces.

Huntington-Whiteley had her second acting role in the film Mad Max: Fury Road, which was released in May 2015. She played The Splendid Angharad, one of the Five Wives of the warlord Immortan Joe. In order to portray her pregnant character, she wore a prosthetic abdomen throughout the film.

Shortly following the birth of her first child, she launched her website named "Rose Inc". The page started out as a beauty publication which worked in tandem with its Instagram and YouTube accounts. In August 2021, the brand expanded to selling its own clean makeup and skincare.

In May 2024, Huntington-Whiteley announced her departure from Rose Inc. after its acquisition by AA Investments, following the bankruptcy of its joint venture partner, Amyris Inc.

In October 2026, Huntington-Whiteley returned to the Victoria's Secret Fashion Show for the first time in 16 years.

== Personal life ==
Huntington-Whiteley has been in a relationship with actor Jason Statham since 2010. In January 2016, her representative confirmed they had become engaged. Their son was born on 24 June 2017. Their second child, a daughter, was born on 2 February 2022. Huntington-Whiteley and Statham lived in California for a number of years before moving back to London in 2020. In a 2021 interview with The Sunday Times, Huntington-Whiteley expressed a desire to raise and educate their children in Britain.

She used to smoke, as she said in an interview with David Letterman: "I got a work placement at a modelling agency and then I spent the week making coffee and picking up the telephone and smoking cigarettes and drinking wine at 11 AM, it was very Ab Fab". She last publicly smoked in 2012 and has since quit.

== Filmography ==
=== Film ===
Year	Title	Role	Notes
2011	Transformers: Dark of the Moon	Carly Spencer	
2015	Mad Max: Fury Road	The Splendid Angharad	

== Accolades ==
Huntington-Whiteley received Elle Style Awards for 2009's "Model of the Year", 2012's "Top Style Icon", and 2015's "Model of the Year". In 2011, she was voted No. 1 in Maxim Magazine's "Hot 100" list and received the "Editor's Special Award" at the Glamour Awards. At the Harper's Bazaar Women of the Year Awards, she was named 2014's "Model of the Year" and 2016's "Businesswoman of the Year".

As of July 2011, Huntington-Whiteley was ranked No. 15 on "The Money Girls" list and No. 3 on the "Top 20 Sexiest Models" list at models.com. She was also voted No. 22 in FHM's World's Sexiest Woman 2015 poll. In 2016 and 2017, she appeared at #5 on Forbes world's highest paid models list with estimated earnings at $9 million and $9.5 million respectively.

== Awards and nominations ==
Year	Award	Category	Nominated work	Result
2009	Elle Style Awards	Model of the Year	Herself	Won
2011	Glamour Awards	Editor's Special Award	Herself	Won
2011	Guys Choice	Our New Girlfriend	Herself	Won
2011	CinemaCon Awards	Female Star of Tomorrow	Herself	Won
2011	Teen Choice Awards	Choice Movie Actress: Summer	Transformers: Dark of the Moon	Won
2012	Golden Raspberry Awards	Worst Supporting Actress	Transformers: Dark of the Moon	Nominated
2012	Golden Raspberry Awards	Worst Screen Couple (shared with Shia LaBeouf)	Transformers: Dark of the Moon	Nominated
2012	Elle Style Awards	Top Style Icon	Herself	Won
2014	Harper's Bazaar Women of the Year	Model of the Year	Herself	Won
2015	Elle Style Awards	Model of the Year	Herself	Won
2016	Harper's Bazaar Women of the Year	Businesswoman of the Year	Herself	Won
2016	Gold Derby Awards	Best Ensemble Cast (shared with the cast)	Mad Max: Fury Road	Nominated

== See also ==
- Huntington-Whiteley baronets

== Bibliography ==
- Rankin Photography: Ten Times Rosie. London: The Full Service, 2010. ISBN 978-0-9563-1555-7.
