= John James Oddy =

British Conservative Party politician (1867–1921)

Sir John James Oddy (24 February 1867 – 20 February 1921) was a British Conservative Party politician. He was elected as Member of Parliament (MP) for Pudsey at a by-election in June 1908, but was defeated at the January 1910 general election.

He unsuccessfully fought the seat again in the December 1910 general election.

The eldest son of James Oddy of Moorlands Hall, Birkenshaw, he was educated at Harrogate College and Leys School, Cambridge. He began his business career in his father's mills aged 17. On the retirement of his father in 1906 he became head of the firm, which is involved with woolen and worsted manufacturing at Moorland Mills.

His family occupied prominent positions in the commercial and public life for Bradford since the 1840s.

Oddy was knighted in the 1916 Birthday Honours and died in Ilkley in 1921. He is buried in the graveyard at Bolton Abbey.

Parliament of the United Kingdom
Preceded by George Whiteley	Member of Parliament for Pudsey; 1908 – January 1910	Succeeded by Frederick Ogden
