= John Addison (MP) =

British judge and politician

His Honour Judge John Edmund Wentworth Addison KC
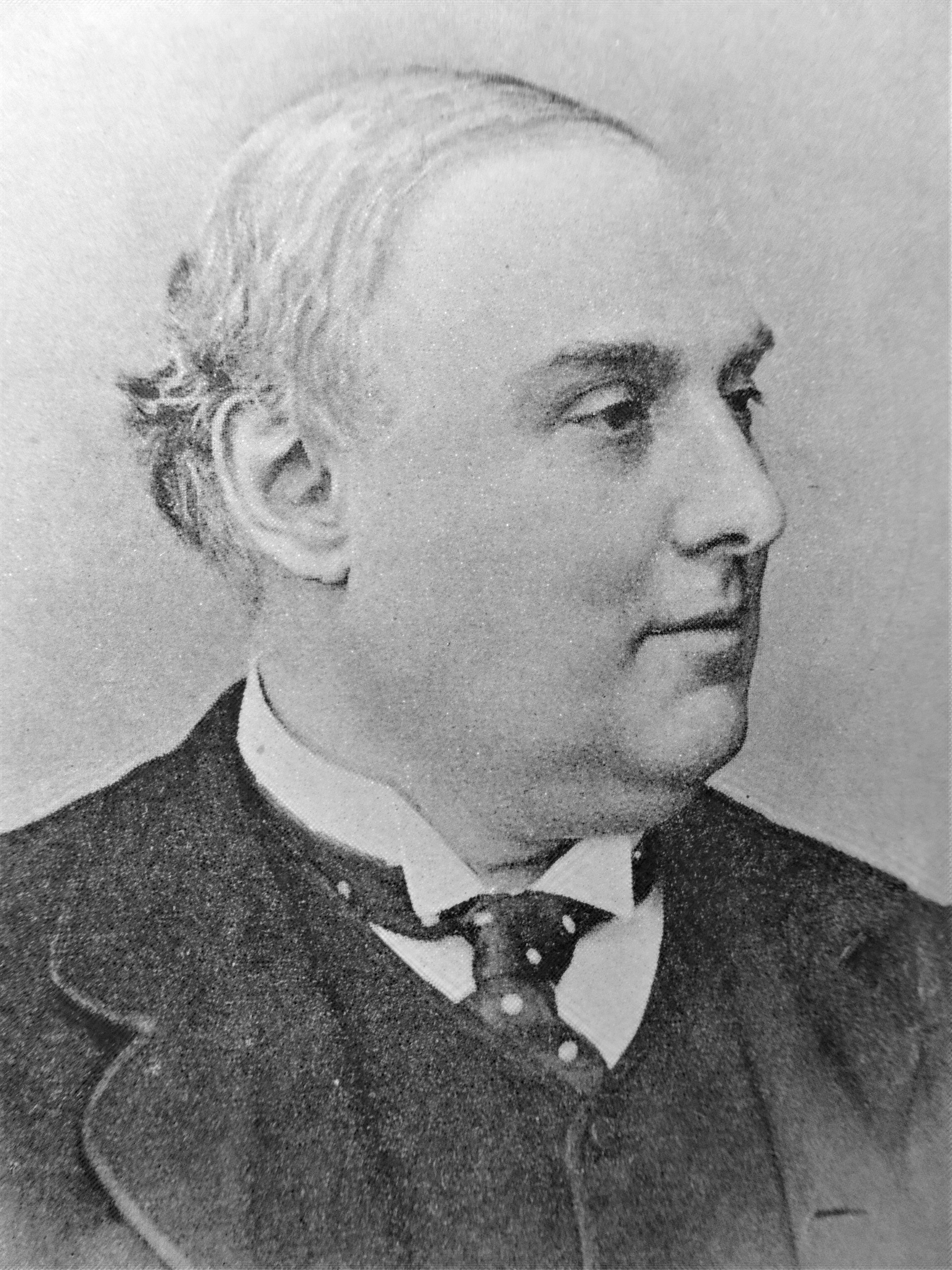

Member of Parliament for Ashton-under-Lyne
- In office 1885–1895
- Preceded by: Hugh Mason
- Succeeded by: Herbert Huntington-Whiteley

Personal details
- Born: 5 November 1838 Bruges, Belgium
- Died: 22 April 1907 (aged 68) Hyde Park, London, England
- Citizenship: British
- Party: Conservative
- Spouse: Alice McKeand (1873–1894 – her death)
- Education: Trinity College Dublin
- Profession: Lawyer, judge

John Edmund Wentworth Addison KC (5 November 1838 – 22 April 1907) was a British judge and Conservative politician.

== Early life ==
Addison was born in 1838 in Bruges, Belgium and was the third son of Lieutenant-Colonel Henry Robert Addison and his second wife, Grace Barton. Colonel Addison was born in India of Irish ancestry. After retiring from the army wrote a number of musical plays and light operas. Addison was educated at Trinity College Dublin before being called to the bar at the Inner Temple in 1862.

== Career ==
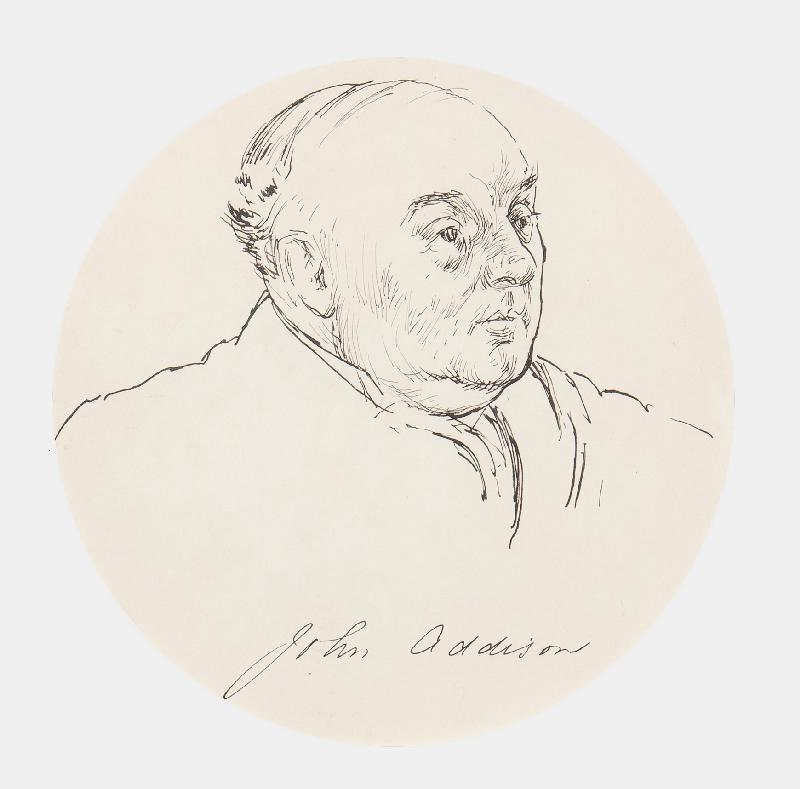
Original pen and ink sketch of Addison by Walter Sickert, used as in illustration in The Whirlwind, 6 September 1890

Addison practised in the Northern circuit and in 1880 became a Queen's Counsel (QC). In 1873 he married Alice McKeand of Manchester, who predeceased him in 1894. In 1874 he was appointed Recorder of Preston, a position he held for sixteen years. In 1889 Addison was the senior prosecuting counsel in the celebrated trial of Florence Maybrick.

At the 1885 general election, he was elected as Conservative Member of Parliament for Ashton under Lyne, defeating the sitting MP, Hugh Mason. At the ensuing general election in 1886 he drew with his Liberal opponent. He was elected by the casting vote of the borough's mayor as a returning officer. He held the seat at the 1892 election before standing down from parliament in 1895.

On leaving the Commons in 1895, Addison was appointed a county court judge in Norfolk and Cambridgeshire. In 1897 he was transferred to the Southwark County Court, where he presided until his retirement due to ill health in 1906.

Judge Addison died at his residence at Hyde Park, London in April 1907, aged 68.

Parliament of the United Kingdom
Preceded by Hugh Mason	Member of Parliament for Ashton under Lyne; 1885–1895	Succeeded by Herbert Huntington-Whiteley
