= One Hans Crescent =

Former judicial building in London, England

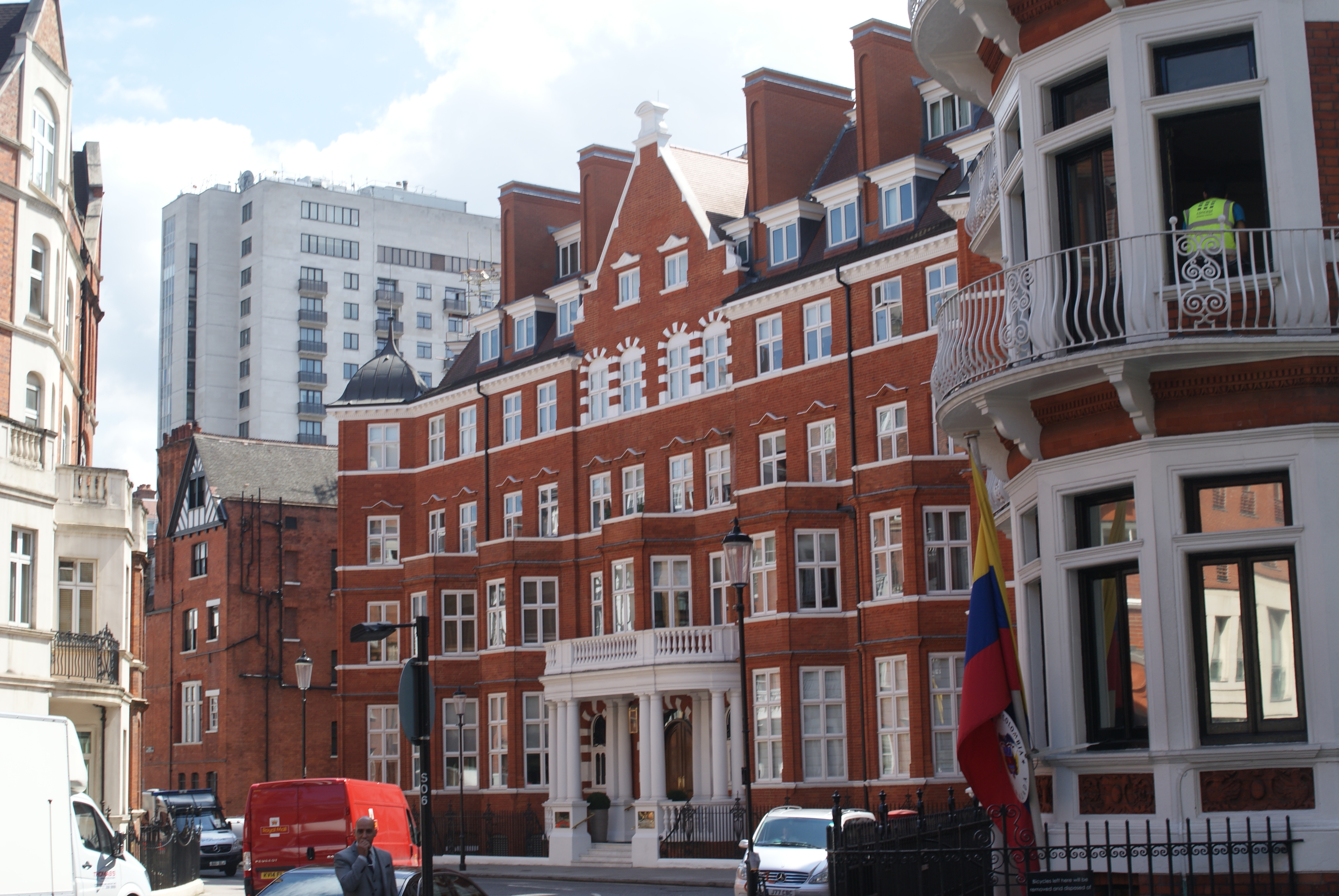
- One Hans Crescent

- Shown in London
- 51.4988°N 0.1610°W
- Location: Hans Crescent, London

History
- Built: 1896

Site notes
- Architect(s): Read & MacDonald
- Architectural style: Renaissance style

One Hans Crescent, formerly the Hans Crescent Hotel and then Knightsbridge Crown Court, is an apartment block, which previously served as a hotel and, later as a crown court, in Hans Crescent in Knightsbridge, London, England.

== History ==
The site on the south side of Hans Crescent was originally part of an open area known as Long Field. The area was developed by an actuary, John Goddard, and his partner, William Watkins, who acquired the freehold of the Brompton Estate in the 1880s.

The building was commissioned as the Hans Crescent Hotel. It designed by Read & MacDonald in the Renaissance style, built by Stephens & Baston with interior fittings by S. J. Waring & Sons and was completed in 1896. The design involved a symmetrical main frontage of seven bays facing onto Hans Crescent. The central bay featured a prominent a prominent oval-shaped portico formed by four pairs of Doric order columns supporting an entablature and a balustrade. The first floor of the central bay and the lower floors of the two flanking bays on either side were fenestrated by bay windows. The second floor was fenestrated by pairs of casement windows, while the third floor was fenestrated by four round-headed windows with voussoirs in the central bay and by pairs of casement windows in the other bays. The end bays were formed by triangular shaped towers which were surmounted by leaded ogee-shaped cupolas. At roof level, there was a modillioned cornice and a central gable containing a pair of attic windows.

The suffragist, Bertha Mason, died in the hotel in 1939. The building was requisitioned by the Ministry of Works during the Second World War for use by the American Red Cross. After the war, it was occupied by the British Council and converted for the use of foreign students. Following the implementation of the Courts Act 1971, it was acquired by the Lord Chancellor's Department for use as Knightsbridge Crown Court. Notable trials in the building included the trial and conviction, in April and May 1991, of 14 drug dealers who had been operating across the UK. The Lord Chancellor's Department subsequently decided to close Knightsbridge Crown Court, and instead, opened a new crown court at an old printing works in Pocock Street in 1993.

The building was acquired by Harrods Estates in 1996, and subsequently converted into apartments. The conversion, which was carried by Kværner, involved the creation of a 25 metres (82 ft) deep basement as well as a tunnel connecting the building to the main Harrods store in Brompton Road. The designer, WSP Global, was awarded Structural Heritage Award for the conversion by the Institution of Structural Engineers in 2002.
