= Joseph Hiley =

British politician

Joseph Hiley (18 August 1902 – 17 November 1989) was a British Conservative Party politician, and a member of the Conservative Monday Club. He was Member of Parliament for Pudsey from 1959 until his retirement at the February 1974 general election.

Parliament of the United Kingdom
Preceded by Cyril Banks	Member of Parliament for Pudsey; 1959 – February 1974	Succeeded by Giles Shaw
