= Cyril Banks =

British politician (1901–1969)

Colonel Cyril Banks MBE (12 August 1901 – 23 October 1969) was a British engineer, company director, and politician. He was a Conservative Party representative, but his friendship with President Nasser and Egypt led him to sacrifice his career over the invasion of Suez.

== Early career ==
Banks was born in Sheffield, to a lower-middle-class family. He was sent to a council school, and then became an apprentice in mechanical engineering for five years. In 1922 he went to the University of Sheffield to study, and became an Associate in Mechanical Engineering. Banks was then employed by the Standard Motor Company for three years.

From 1926 Banks went to India where he worked as Chief Engineer of Madras Tramways. He returned to Britain in 1929 to work for Guy Motors Ltd., and the next year married Gladys Drackley; they had no children. He moved in 1930 to be transport adviser to the Goodyear Tyre and Rubber Company; Banks was an Associate of the Institute of Transport.

== Wartime civil service ==
In 1935 Banks set up Banks Equipment Ltd, an engineering company, of which he became managing director. The outbreak of the Second World War led him to volunteer for duty in the wartime Civil service, and he was drafted in to be Transport Officer for the North-Eastern Division of the Ministry of Food. From 1940 he was Emergency Feeding Officer and Assistant Director of the Wartime Meals Division of the Ministry, and he was awarded the MBE for his work in the role. He represented the Association of Municipal Corporations on the Nurses Salaries Committee chaired by Lord Rushcliffe which published two reports in 1943

== War Office ==
Banks received a promotion in 1943 to the War Office Civil Affairs Branch where he was chief supply officer for the Chief of Staff, Supreme Allied Command ('COSSAC'). He was commissioned on the British Army General List in 1943 and soon became a lieutenant-colonel. He was soon promoted again to the rank of colonel and the responsibility for supply to Supreme Headquarters Allied Expeditionary Force (SHAEF). Banks was making the arrangements to supply the allied armies after the Battle of Normandy.

== Pudsey politics ==
After the war, Banks settled in Otley, to the north of Leeds. He was elected to West Riding of Yorkshire County Council from Otley in 1946. He stood down in 1949 on being selected as Conservative Party candidate for Pudsey, a newly created constituency based on Pudsey and Otley which was expected to be closely fought. The constituency had lost the Conservative-voting Otley to Ripon, and with it went the sitting Member Malcolm Stoddart-Scott.

== 1950 election ==
Banks was rated as a moderate candidate who could appeal to moderates in other parties, but on the eve of poll The Times still felt that the Labour Party candidate had the best chance of winning. However, on election day Banks won with a majority of 64. This was the fourth smallest majority of the election.

== Food supplies ==
He made his maiden speech in May, in a debate on the far east and Asia; he concentrated on availability of food and speculated that if the calorie scale was lifted then the people there would be the finest defence against Communism. He came back to the issue two days later in respect of the British people. In November 1950, Banks was one of the Members picked to introduce a Private Member's Bill, and presented a Bill to improve the packaging and handling of food; he was not high enough up the list for his Bill to be passed.

Banks led an attack on government restrictions on the Nickel industry in July 1951, moving to annul an order which prohibited the manufacture of goods of more than 8% Nickel. At the general election in October 1951, Banks fought for re-election with the benefit of incumbency and of the Liberal Party's decision not to field a candidate; he was re-elected with his majority increased to 3,356.

== Egyptian contacts ==
Minister of Transport and Civil Aviation Alan Lennox-Boyd appointed Banks as his joint Parliamentary Private Secretary in November 1952, but the appointment lasted only until September 1953. He was less active in the Parliament, because he was building up contacts with the government of Egypt: in September 1954 he was invited to join the Egyptian Government production council as an adviser.

== Suez ==
In July 1954, Banks had made a speech in a debate on Egypt which made his position plain. He declared it would be wrong to judge Colonel Nasser as an individual merely because he had called for British troops to be withdrawn from the Suez Canal Zone, and called for help to the Egyptian government to irrigate land and feed the starving people.

After again increasing his majority in the 1955 general election, Banks continued to campaign for better relations with Egypt. He spoke in December 1955, threatening that the Middle East would turn to the Soviet Union for help if they got none from the west. He also urged that Palestinian refugees be settled where they were then living because it was impossible to resettle them all in Israel. At the same time, Banks was making an unofficial attempt to try to start talks between Israel and Egypt.

=== Resignation of the whip ===
Nasser's nationalisation of the canal, and Anthony Eden's strong response, placed Banks in a difficult position and he deplored the vacillation in policy, while agreeing in principle with Eden that the canal should be an international waterway. When Eden sent British troops to occupy the canal, Banks was appalled and on 8 November he announced to his constituents that he had renounced the Government Whip to sit as an Independent.

Banks' stance was not approved by his local association. On 15 November the executive of Pudsey Conservative Association passed a resolution pledging support for the Prime Minister and appointed a committee to select a new candidate for the next election. Banks made it clear that he would continue to represent the constituency without the support of the association.

== Egyptian contacts ==
Banks was called on by the War Office to help when the Egyptians abducted Anthony Moorhouse from Port Said during a time when Banks was in Egypt; Banks was able to ask Nasser about the officer's fate. In February 1957 Banks went again to Cairo, trying to intervene on behalf of a Briton employed by the Prudential Insurance Company who was on trial for espionage. Banks was optimistic after these visits that the relationship between Britain and Egypt could be improved.

== Sacrifice of career ==
However, Banks knew that the chances of an independent candidate were minimal, and that despite the withdrawal from Suez in 1957 he could not hope to re-establish his career in the Conservative Party. In November 1957 he explained that he had sacrificed his political career in an attempt to promote understanding in the Middle East, and would stand down at the next election. He refused to be ashamed by being a friend of President Nasser, whom he declared wanted friendship with the west. After a visit to Egypt the following month, Banks complained at the propaganda being broadcast to Egypt by a station called "The Voice of Truth" set up in Cyprus, which accused Egyptian ministers of homosexuality and venality.

In December 1958, Banks was again granted the Conservative Party whip. He continued to visit Egypt, personally intervening on behalf of individual Britons imprisoned there, and after he ceased to be a Member of Parliament he visited in order to confirm that Egypt was not preparing for war against Israel.

Parliament of the United Kingdom
New constituency	Member of Parliament for Pudsey; 1950 – 1959	Succeeded by Joseph Hiley
