= Hugh Mason =

English miller and politician (1817–1886)

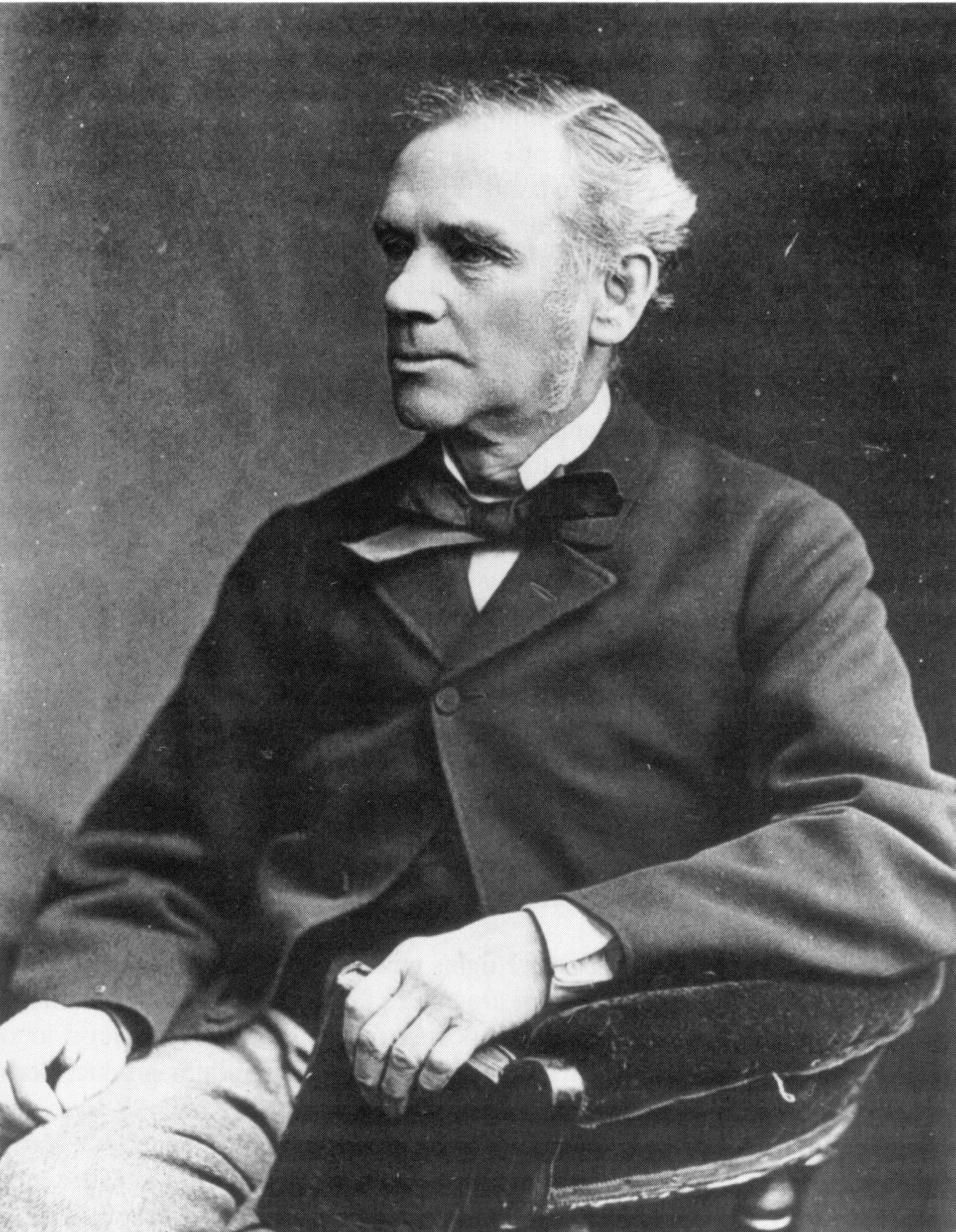
- Portrait of Hugh Mason

Personal details
- Born: 30 January 1817 Stalybridge, Cheshire, England
- Died: 2 February 1886 (aged 69) Ashton-under-Lyne, Lancashire, England
- Party: Liberal
- Spouse(s): Sarah Buckley (1846–1852); Betsy Buckley (1854–1861); Anne Ashworth(1864–1886)
- Children: Bertha, Edith, Rupert, Sydney
- Occupation: Mill owner

Hugh Mason (30 January 1817 – 2 February 1886) was an English mill owner, social reformer and Liberal politician. He was born in Stalybridge and brought up in Stalybridge and Ashton-under-Lyne until he entered the family cotton business in 1838 after a seven-year period working in a bank. Having originally opposed trade unions, Mason became a paternalistic mill owner, creating a colony for his workers with associated facilities and ensuring that they experienced good conditions. During the Lancashire Cotton Famine of the 1860s he refused to cut workers' wages although it was common practice.

Mason became the first Liberal to be elected councillor for Ashton-under-Lyne in 1856. He was mayor of the council from 1857 to 1860 and retired from local politics in 1874 due to conflict with his own party. Mason returned to the Liberals in 1878 when he stood for election as Member of Parliament for Ashton-under-Lyne. He was voted in and supported progressive policies, which included women's suffrage, making him unpopular within his own party. He was MP from 1880 to 1885. When he died in 1886, aged 69, Hugh Mason had amassed £290,933 (now about £17 million).

== Early life and business career ==
Hugh Mason was born in Stalybridge, Cheshire, on 11 May 1817 and christened there. He was the youngest of four children of Thomas Mason, a former textile manager, and Mary, the daughter of John Holden, Esq. The family had moved to Stalybridge from Derbyshire in 1776. After working as the manager of a mill in Ashton-under-Lyne, Thomas established his own business in 1815 in partnership with James Booth and Edward Hulton at Currier Slacks Mill in the town. Rapid growth in their enterprise saw them expand into the Bank Mill and Royal George Mills in the 1820s and Albion Mill in the 1830s. At the age of 10, Hugh was working in the mill, and his education consisted of attending Methodist Sunday schools in Ashton-under-Lyne and Stalybridge and spending three years at a private school in Ashton-under-Lyne.

After leaving school at the age of 14, Mason got a job with the district bank while he attended night school in his spare time. He worked there until 1838, when he left at the age of 21 to join the family's cotton business. He became the driving force behind the business. The business thrived: by the early 1850s the Mason family had built two state-of-the-art cotton mills in the Ryecroft area of Ashton-under-Lyne, known as the Oxford Mills. He was able to purchase Groby Hall, in Ashton, the ancestral seat of the former Lord Greys of Groby.

In 1845, to house the workers for the mills, Mason began construction of a "workers' colony". The colony not only provided 150 terrace houses (Note: Some of these houses still survive, including Hamilton Street, Gibson Terrace and "The Twelve Apostles" in Trafalgar Square.) (housing an estimated 691 people in 1872) but also leisure facilities such as a library, a swimming pool, a gymnasium, and a reading room. Mason built up what he saw as a model industrial community, and according to Mason himself, the annual death rate was significantly lower than in the rest of Ashton-under-Lyne. Residents were expected to adhere to his strict moral code and he discouraged the use of public houses. He estimated that establishing the settlement cost him around £10,000 and a further £1,000 per year to maintain (about £600,000 today and a further £60,000 to maintain).

Under Hugh Mason's leadership, the company prospered. The number of mule spindles in use at the mills increased from 20,000 in 1846 to 75,000 in 1887. His two brothers, Henry and Booth, also worked in the company until retired in 1848 and 1853 respectively. Their father remained active in the company until 1860 when he retired, leaving Hugh as the sole owner. The Manchester Cotton Company was set up in 1860 and Mason's success in the cotton industry led him to become its chairman from the beginning until its winding up, which began in 1864, but was not concluded until 1867. The purpose of the company was to increase the number of producers of cotton; this was important as the American market was closed off during the American Civil War, causing the Lancashire Cotton Famine. Mason served as President of the Manchester Chamber of Commerce from 1871 to 1874, and came to hold interests in the Bridgewater Canal Navigation Company, the Midland Railway Company, the Mersey Dock Board, and various other coal and iron companies.

Having initially opposed trade unions and factory legislation, Mason changed his mind around the 1850s regarding how workers should be treated, believing that the welfare of the employees impacted on the welfare of the employer. He became popular among workers for such things as becoming the first local employer to give his workers Saturday afternoons off. During the Lancashire Cotton Famine of 1861–1865 he refused to cut workers' wages as was common during the period. He stated:

I will keep my work people employed, and if there is no work, lend them money from my own pocket rather than have them apply for relief. The poor rate is only 1s 6d in the pound. I will pay as high a poor rate as the Poor Law Guardians deem necessary.

As well as this, he contributed £500 (about the equivalent of £30,000 today) to the Ashton borough cotton famine relief. During the tumultuous 1870s and 1880s, Mason kept his workforce fully employed and continued to invest in his mills. By 1884, wages in his mills were 25% higher than they had been in 1870 even though his employees were working fewer hours. The Manchester Guardian noted:

Hugh Mason is one of the first amongst those wealthy manufacturers of Lancashire who devote the hours which are not occupied by business to the service of their fellow men. He has been accustomed to take a leading part in the various public improvements, and he has long been a political chief. At Ashton he is unpopular: the ruggedness which mars his virtues, and the self assertion which stamps his conduct, do not invite the affection of his fellow. Although he has done more than any other millowner on securing the physical and social well-being of his employees, he is not highly esteemed. He has built for his workpeople admirable cottages, swimming baths, gymnasiums and lecture halls, but beneficent acts do not suffice to secure popularity unless there is a suavity of manner and sympathy of nature in the benefactor, and these are qualities which Mr Mason lacks. Mr Mason is a staunch liberal, and is reckoned to be one of the oracles of the local party. His figure is a familiar one at free trade meetings where the citizens of Manchester never fail to receive him with the utmost enthusiasm. The working men hail his appearance with tempestuous applause, and invariable reward his rhetorical efforts with frequent and deafening cheers.

== Political career ==
=== Local ===
Hugh Mason was influenced by his father's Liberal politics and strongly opposed to injustice and prejudice. Thomas Mason was a supporter of political representation for Ashton-under-Lyne and supported the repeal of the Corn Laws. In the early 19th century, the area was poorly represented in Parliament. The major urban centres of Manchester, Salford, Bolton, Blackburn, Rochdale, Ashton-under-Lyne, Oldham and Stockport – with a combined population of almost one million – were represented by either the two county MPs for Lancashire (or the two for Cheshire in the case of Stockport). By comparison, more than half of all MPs were elected by a total of just 154 voters. These inequalities in political representation led to calls for reform and eventually the Peterloo Massacre in 1819. Hugh said of his father that "To his life of honest industry, to his example of commercial probity, to his high Christian character, to his training, of me in my early years, to his wise consuls, I owe under God my position in society."

Although he claimed he was reluctant to enter politics, Hugh Mason became the first Liberal elected councillor for Ashton-under-Lyne in November 1856. He represented the Portland Place ward from 1856 until his retirement from politics in 1874. Mason quickly made an impression and was elected mayor for three consecutive years between 1857 and 1860, which had never happened before. He supported progressive measures such as opening a public park, providing public libraries, and addressing unsanitary conditions in parts of Ashton-under-Lyne.

Mason's policies led him to come into constant clashes with the Conservative members of the council. He was not always popular within his own party either and he even financed his own newspaper, the Ashton-under-Lyne News, to convey his views and provide competition for the pro-Liberal Ashton Reporter. Conflict with the Liberals drove Mason into early retirement from local politics in 1874 at the age of 57.

As well as being a councillor, Mason was also elected a local magistrate for Ashton-under-Lyne in 1857. During his time in office he had to deal with the bread riots of 21–22 March 1863 (caused by the cotton famine) and the Murphy Riots in May 1868. The Murphy Riots were anti-Catholic demonstrations, fueled by Fenianism (an Irish nationalist organisation), across Lancashire led by William Murphy. He personally went to one mob during the Murphy Riots to read them the riot act face-to-face. He was appointed a Deputy Lieutenant of the County Palatine of Lancaster on 21 June 1862. Such was his significance in Manchester he was appointed President of the Chamber of Commerce for two years from 1871. At the same time he was a Governor of Owen's College in the city. Mason was appointed a member of the Board of the Mersey Docks and Harbour.

=== National ===
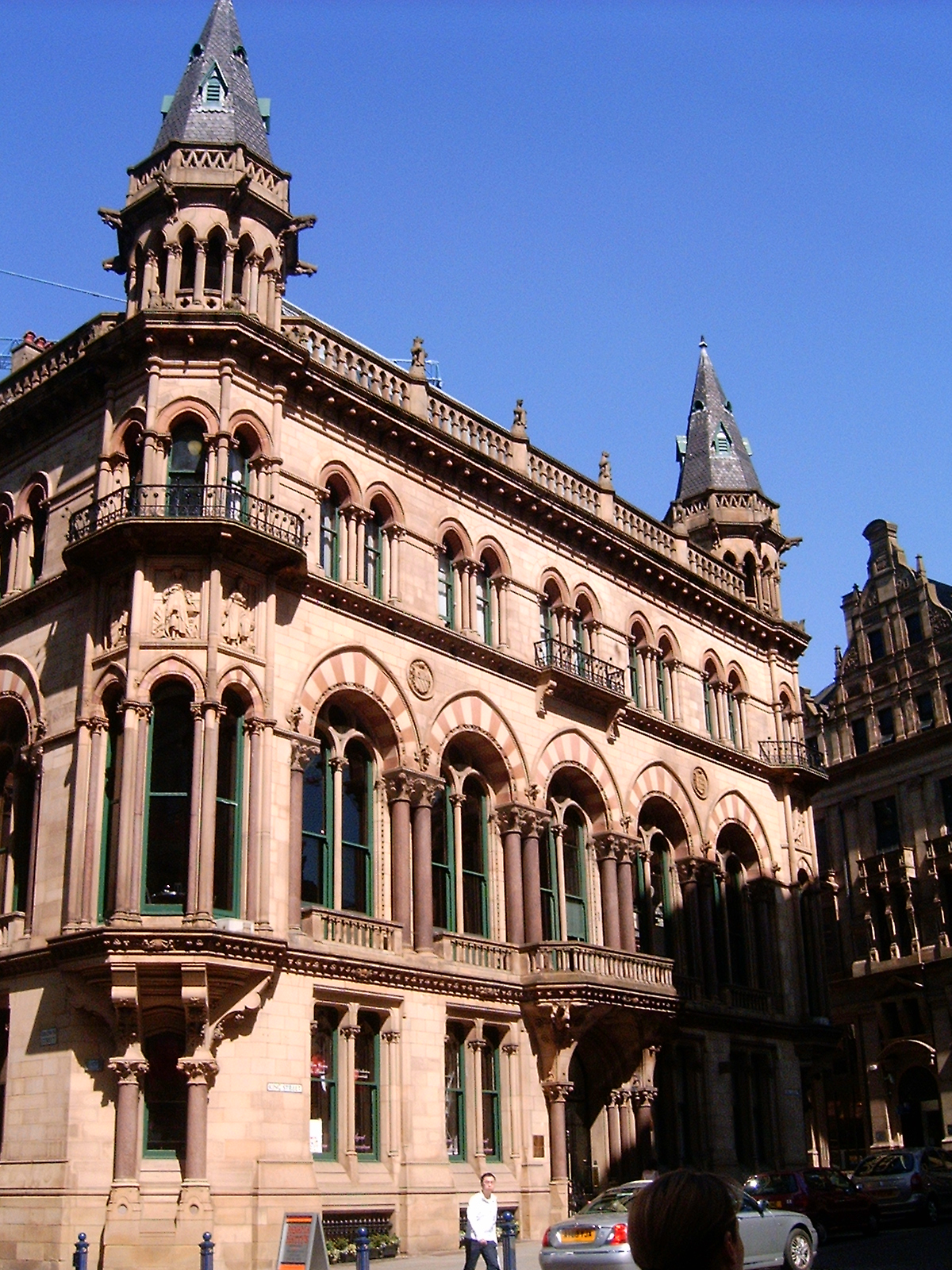
The Manchester Reform Club building. Mason was a founder member of the club.

Mason, along with a group of other Advanced Liberals supporting John Morley, the gladstonian, was one of the founding members of the Reform Club in Manchester, a political club founded in 1867 for Liberals and their supporters. Despite retiring from local politics because of conflict with the Liberals, by 1878 he was back in favour and Liberal councillors were encouraging Mason to stand for parliamentary election. Although he was a popular candidate, he was initially reluctant to put himself forward. However, he stood for Parliament in the 1880 General Elections. His campaign in March and April 1880 involved vitriolic attacks on the local Conservative Party and on 3 April 1880 he was elected MP for Ashton-under-Lyne, beating his opponent, John Ross Coulthart, by 2,966 votes to 2,586.

As an MP he lived at 33 Onslow Square, Kensington, and was a member of the Reform Club. Mason supported many reformist bills and became a spokesman of the Women's Suffrage Association in 1881. He proposed motions for women's suffrage in 1881 and again in 1883 but was defeated on both occasions. He led the women's suffrage movement until 1883 when illness forced him to retreat from public life temporarily. His defeat in the 1885 General Elections was ascribed to his support of William Ewart Gladstone over the issue of Irish Home Rule and to his illness. He lost to the Conservative John Wentworth Addison by 3,152 votes to 3,104. Mason demanded a recount, but this increased the majority by one vote; he succumbed to illness and died before the result was announced.

== Personal life ==
In 1846 Hugh Mason married Sarah Buckley, the daughter of Abel Buckley, Esq, who was also the father of Abel Buckley Businessman and MP, another cotton mill owner who went on to be a millionaire businessman and landowner. They had one child, Arnold, who was born in 1851. Sarah died in 1852 at the age of 29. Mason next married Sarah's sister, Betsy, though it was illegal to marry one's sister-in-law in England at the time. To overcome this problem they married in Denmark on 7 June 1854. Their marriage was approved by special licence from the King of Denmark and was held at the Evangellic Reform Church, Altona in the Duchy of Holstein. They had four children: Bertha, born in 1855, Edith in 1857, Rupert in 1859 and Sydney in 1861. Betsy died after the birth of Sydney and Mason then married for a third time Annie, daughter of George Ashworth, Esq, of Rochdale in 1864. Bertha became known as a campaigner for women's suffrage and temperance.

Hugh Mason died three days after his 69th birthday on 2 February 1886 at his home, Groby Hall. At his death, he had amassed a fortune worth £290,933 (now worth about £17M). He was the first person to have a statue (now protected as a Grade II listed building) erected in his honour in Tameside; it was financed by public subscription immediately after Mason's death.

== Notes ==
Parliament of the United Kingdom
Preceded by Thomas Walton Mellor	Member of Parliament for Ashton-under-Lyne; 1880–1885	Succeeded by John Addison
