= Alfred Scott (British politician) =

British Liberal politician

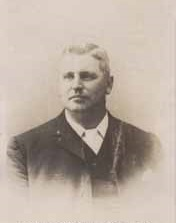
Alfred Henry Scott MP, circa 1906

Alfred Henry Scott (24 June 1868 – 17 July 1939) was a British Liberal politician.

== Background ==
Scott was born in Ardwick, Manchester, the eldest son of Charles Henry Scott JP. He was educated at Altrincham Grammar School; Tideswell Grammar School and Lichfield Grammar School. In 1907 he married Katherine Duncan, the widow of Mr Lewis of Kentucky.

He entered business as a merchant in the city. He was elected to Manchester City Council in 1897. At the 1900 general election he was the Liberal candidate at Manchester East, where he stood against the Conservative First Lord of the Treasury, Arthur Balfour. In his election address he set out his political views: he supported reform of the Army, Home Rule for Ireland, the temperance movement, abolition of the House of Lords, and nationalisation or municipalisation of land, railways and mines.

2 October 1900: Manchester East Electorate 12,727
Party	Candidate	Votes	%	±%
Conservative	Arthur Balfour	5,803	63.4	
Liberal	Alfred Scott	3,350	36.6	
Majority		2,453	26.8	
Turnout			71.9	
Conservative hold		Swing		

At the next general election in 1906 he stood at Ashton under Lyne, and was elected as the town's Member of Parliament.

General election 1906: Ashton-under-Lyne Electorate 8,248
Party	Candidate	Votes	%	±%
Liberal	Alfred Scott	4,310	56.3	+20.4
Conservative	Herbert Whiteley	3,342	43.7	−9.4
Majority		968	12.6	
Turnout		7,652	92.8	+6.6
Liberal gain from Conservative		Swing	+14.8	

Following his election to parliament, he stood down from Manchester City Council, after 9 years service. In 1907 he became vice-president of the Association of Municipal Corporations. Whilst an MP he voted in favour of the 1908 Women's Enfranchisement Bill. He held the seat at the January 1910 election.

General election January 1910: Ashton-under-Lyne Electorate 8,597
Party	Candidate	Votes	%	±%
Liberal	Alfred Scott	4,039	49.3	−7.0
Conservative	Herbert Whiteley	3,746	45.9	+2.2
Independent Labour	William Gee	413	5.0	
Majority		293	3.6	−9.0
Turnout		8,198	95.4	+2.6
Liberal hold		Swing	-4.6	

A second general election was held in December of the same year. Scott was defeated by the Canadian millionaire Max Aitken (later Lord Beaverbrook), who had been "parachuted" in as the Liberal Unionist candidate.

General election December 1910: Ashton-under-Lyne Electorate 8,597
Party	Candidate	Votes	%	±%
Conservative	Max Aitken	4,044	51.1	+5.5
Liberal	Alfred Scott	3,848	48.8	−0.5
Majority		196	2.4	
Turnout		7,652	91.8	−3.6
Conservative gain from Liberal		Swing	+3.0	

Scott moved to London. In 1913 he contested the 1913 London County Council election as a Progressive Party candidate at Greenwich but was defeated.

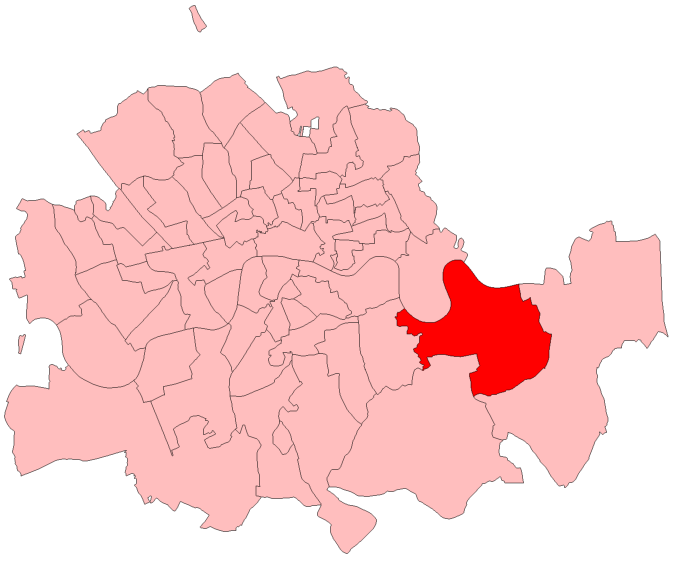
Greenwich in the metropolitan area, 1885-1918

London County Council election, 1913: Greenwich Electorate
Party	Candidate	Votes	%	±%
Municipal Reform	✓ George Hume	4,815		
Municipal Reform	✓ Lord Hill	4,787		
Progressive	Alfred Scott	4,486		
Progressive	Hugh Moulton	4,463		
Majority		301		
Municipal Reform hold		Swing		
Municipal Reform hold		Swing		

Despite this defeat he was immediately appointed to be a Progressive Party alderman on the London County Council. The Progressives were the municipal wing of the Liberal Party in London. He remained a member of the LCC until 1919. Scott attempted to return to the Commons, and was the unsuccessful Liberal candidate at Darlington in 1918, where the Unionist candidate was endorsed by the Coalition Government;

General election 1918: Darlington Electorate 28,660
Party	Candidate	Votes	%	±%
Unionist	Herbert Pease	11,951	61.5	
Liberal	Alfred Scott	7,494	38.5	
Majority		4,457	23.0	
Turnout			67.8	
Unionist hold		Swing		

In 1922 he stood for election to the London County Council and was defeated by a Municipal Reform Party opponent in the St Pancras South East Division.

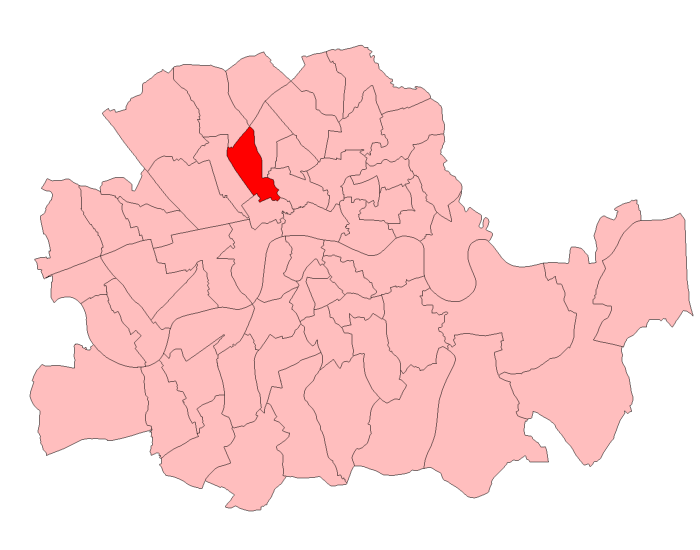
St Pancras South East in the London County area 1918-49

1922 London County Council election: St. Pancras South East Electorate 26,111
Party	Candidate	Votes	%	±%
Municipal Reform	✓ E J Hopkins	5,158	26.8	
Municipal Reform	✓ David Davies	5,114	26.6	
Labour	S Presbury	2,617	13.6	
Labour	HD Large	2,613	13.6	
Progressive	Arthur Lewis Leon	1,859	9.7	
Progressive	Alfred Scott	1,856	9.7	
Majority		2,497	13.0	
Municipal Reform hold		Swing		
Municipal Reform hold		Swing		

Later that year he again stood as a candidate at the general election; West Ham Stratford in 1922

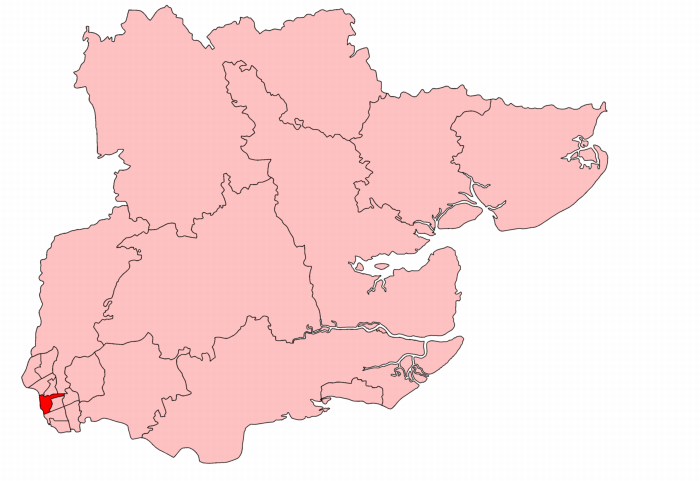
Stratford in Essex, showing boundaries used in 1922

General election 1922: Stratford West Ham Electorate 32,930
Party	Candidate	Votes	%	±%
Labour	Thomas Groves	10,017	46.8	n/a
Unionist	Leonard Lyle	8,641	40.5	−23.3
Liberal	Alfred Scott		12.7	−23.5
Majority		1,376	6.3	33.9
Turnout			64.9	+22.6
Labour gain from Unionist		Swing	n/a	

and the following year he stood for parliament at Finsbury in 1923.

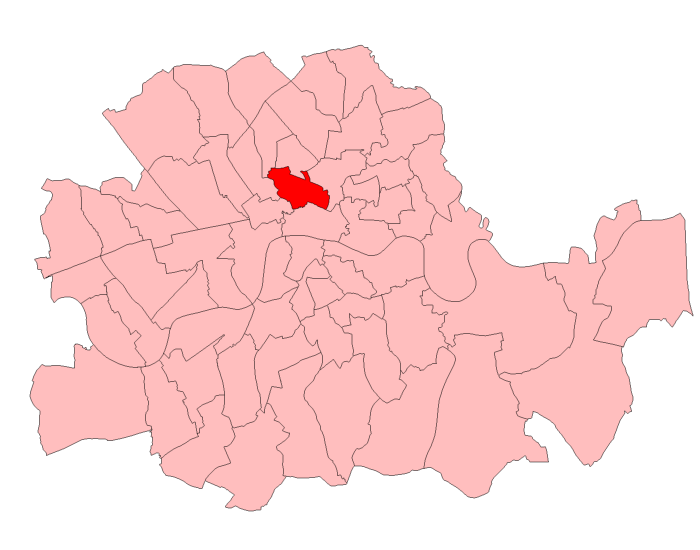
Finsbury in the County of London, showing boundaries used in 1923

General election 1923: Finsbury Electorate 39,109
Party	Candidate	Votes	%	±%
Labour	George Gillett	8,907	42.4	+19.1
Unionist	Martin Archer-Shee	7,063	33.6	−11.0
Liberal	Alfred Scott	5,054	24.0	−6.4
Majority		1,844	8.8	30.1
Turnout		21,024	53.8	−0.5
Labour gain from Unionist		Swing	+15.0	

He retired to Birchington, Margate where he was appointed as an Alderman and served as a Justice of the Peace. He died in Thanet, Kent aged 71.

Parliament of the United Kingdom
Preceded by Herbert Huntington-Whiteley	Member of Parliament for Ashton-under-Lyne; 1906 – Dec. 1910	Succeeded by Max Aitken
