= Blackfriars Crown Court =

Judicial building in London, England

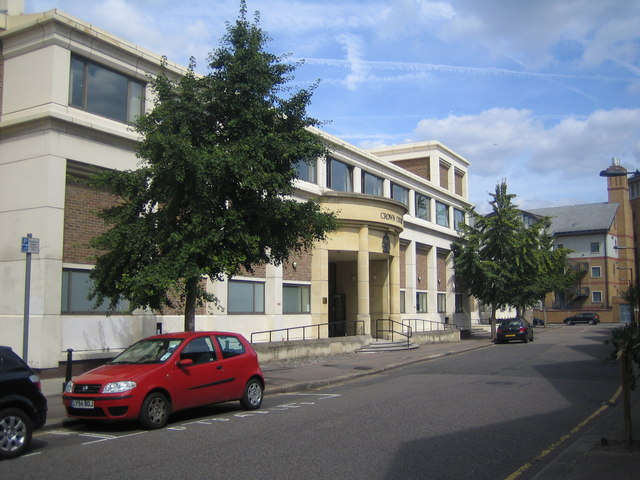
- Blackfriars Crown Court

- Shown in London
- 51.50251°N 0.09993°W
- Location: Pocock Street, Southwark, London

History
- Built: 1950s

Site notes
- Architectural style: Modernist style

Blackfriars Crown Court was a Crown Court centre which dealt with criminal cases at 1–15 Pocock Street, London SE1. It is located in Southwark a short distance from Blackfriars Road, from which it takes its name.

== History ==
The site was used by HM Stationery Office from at least the 1920s. The current building was designed in the modernist style, constructed by The Pitcher Construction Company in red brick with stone dressings, and was opened as a new printworks for HM Stationery Office in the 1950s. The design involved a long rectangular frontage facing into Pocock Street.

In the early 1990s, Lord Chancellor's Department decided to close Knightsbridge Crown Court in Hans Crescent and to establish a new crown court at the old printing works. The building was then refurbished, augmented with a central entrance in Post-Modernist style, and opened as a courthouse in 1993, accommodating nine courtrooms.

In 2013, a judge at the court ruled that a woman should remove her niqāb while giving evidence.

In 2015, Lorraine Barwell, a custody officer at the court, died after being assaulted while escorting a prisoner to a van.

After cases had been relocated to Snaresbrook, Wood Green, Inner London and Kingston upon Thames Crown Courts, depending upon the prosecuting authority, the court closed on 20 December 2019.

In December 2020, a planning application was submitted for a mixed use development, which would see the roof of the building transformed into an "urban forest". In 2021, the building was used to film legal scenes for the Netflix revival of Top Boy.

== See also ==
- Southwark Crown Court
- Inner London Crown Court
