= Ryecroft, Greater Manchester =

Coordinates: 53°29′N 2°07′W

Ryecroft is an area of Ashton-under-Lyne, a town in Greater Manchester, England. It occupies a western area of Ashton.

Originally a farm held by Robert de Wright in 1422 the principal tenant at the will of Sir John de Assheton. It was not until Joseph Stanfield Grimshaw rented the area to Abel Buckley at a half yearly rent of £125 that development took place when Abel and his brother John Smith Buckley built the first of the Ryecroft Mills in the 1830s.

Hugh Mason, social reformer and Liberal politician owned cotton mills in Rycroft in the 19th century, before becoming mayor and Member of Parliament for Ashton-under-Lyne.
