= Paul Truswell =

British politician

Member of Parliament for Pudsey
- In office 1 May 1997 – 12 April 2010
- Preceded by: Giles Shaw
- Succeeded by: Stuart Andrew

Leeds City Councillor for Middleton Park Ward
- In office 2012–2023
- Preceded by: Geoff Driver
- Succeeded by: Emma Pogson-Golden

Leeds City Councillor for Headingley Ward
- In office 1982–1997
- Preceded by: Ernest Millet
- Succeeded by: David Black

Personal details
- Born: 17 November 1953 (age 72) Sheffield, England
- Party: Labour
- Spouse: Suzanne
- Children: 2
- Education: University of Leeds

Paul Anthony Truswell (born 17 November 1953) is an English Labour Party politician and former Member of Parliament (MP) for Pudsey from 1997 to 2010.

Born in Sheffield, Truswell moved to Leeds at 18 to study History at the University of Leeds and initially worked as a journalist for the Yorkshire Evening Post for a decade. He then spent another ten years working in local government in social services at Wakefield Council.

He was elected in 1982 as a Leeds City Councillor for Headingley ward, until his election to Parliament after 15 years on the council. He was the first non conservative member in the seat for 75 years.

During his tenure as MP he passed the Licensing (Young Persons) Bill, which tightened rules around the sale of alcohol to under 18 year olds, following the death of a young constituent.

Truswell retired as an MP at the 2010 general election. He had announced on 8 July 2009 that, "we all have to deal with life's many problems, but my recent traumatic car crash... has come on top of a period when I have found it increasingly difficult to undertake my heavy workload as an MP and to cope with a succession of family and personal issues, including illness, bereavement, and caring responsibilities. I have reluctantly come to the conclusion that I do not, at this time, have the physical and mental stamina to fulfil both of the hugely demanding roles of MP and parliamentary candidate in the run-up to the next general election."

After leaving Parliament, he was re-elected to Leeds City Council in May 2012 for the Middleton Park ward and held the position until 2022. He was later made an Honorary Alderman for the council.

Parliament of the United Kingdom
Preceded by Giles Shaw	Member of Parliament for Pudsey; 1997–2010	Succeeded by Stuart Andrew
