= Briggs Priestley =

English cloth manufacturer and politician

Briggs Priestley

Briggs Priestley (16 March 1831 – 21 October 1907) was an English cloth manufacturer and Liberal Party politician from Bradford in West Yorkshire.

== Biography ==
Priestley was born at Thornton in the West Riding of Yorkshire. He started work as a millhand in the factory of Craven and Harrop at Thornton, but worked his way up and in 1858, he entered into partnership with Francis Craven. In 1860 he partnered his brother Henry in the Shearbridge Mills, and then took over the Atlas Mills in Laisterdyke. He also had worsted mills in Thornton. His company was one of the pioneers in manufacturing waterproof fabrics.

In 1867 Priestley was elected to the Bradford Town Council and was responsible for the provision of a park in Horton and for the establishment of an art gallery and museum in Bradford. He established a free school for orphan children in New Leeds district in 1868 and two years later another in the Bolton Road. In 1877 he became Mayor of Bradford and raised funding for Bradford College. He became an alderman in 1879 and retired from the council in 1880. Priestley was member of the Council of the Bradford Chamber of Commerce, the Bradford Board of Guardians and the Infirmary Board and was a J.P.

Priestley was an advanced liberal and became president of the East Bradford Liberal Association. He was elected as Member of Parliament (MP) for Pudsey at the 1885 general election and held the seat until he retired from the House of Commons at the 1900 general election. He donated the bandstand at Pudsey. Priestley lived at Ferncliffe, Apperley Bridge where he died at the age of 76. His son William was subsequently MP for Bradford East, and his youngest son Sir Arthur was MP for Grantham.

Parliament of the United Kingdom
New constituency see Eastern West Riding constituency	Member of Parliament for Pudsey; 1885–1900	Succeeded by George Whiteley
