= Herbert Huntington-Whiteley =

British politician (1857–1936)

Huntington-Whiteley in 1895.

Sir Herbert James Huntington-Whiteley, 1st Baronet (8 December 1857 – 22 January 1936) was a British Conservative politician.

== Biography ==
He was born as Herbert James Whiteley, and was the younger son of George Whiteley of Blackburn, Lancashire. His elder brother, George, was a prominent Conservative, later Liberal politician, and was later created Baron Marchamley. Herbert, however, remained a Conservative in politics. He became a member of Blackburn town council, and in 1892 was mayor of the borough.

In 1895 he married Florence Kate Huntington, eldest daughter of William Balle Huntington of Darwen, Lancashire. They had two sons.

In 1895 he was elected as Member of Parliament for Ashton-under-Lyne, and held the seat for eleven years until defeated in the Liberal landslide election in 1906.

Whiteley moved to Thorngrove, near Worcester, and in 1913 was High Sheriff of the county. In 1916 he returned to The Commons at by-election for Droitwich.

In March 1918 Whiteley was granted a royal licence allowing him to add the surname and coat of arms of his late father in law to his own. In the same month he was created a baronet, "of Grimley in the County of Worcester". The Droitwich constituency was abolished by the Representation of the People Act 1918, and Huntington Whiteley retired from parliament.

He died at his Worcestershire home in January 1936, aged 78.

He is the great-great-grandfather of model Rosie Huntington-Whiteley. His grandson, Herbert Oliver ("Peter") Huntington-Whiteley, was a captain in Ian Fleming's famed 30 Assault Unit during World War II. The latter's maternal grandfather was Prime Minister Stanley Baldwin, whose mother Louisa (née Macdonald) was aunt of the poet Rudyard Kipling and sister-in-law of painters Sir Edward Burne-Jones and Sir Edward Poynter.

Parliament of the United Kingdom
Preceded by John Addison	Member of Parliament for Ashton-under-Lyne; 1895 – 1906	Succeeded by Alfred Scott
Preceded by John Lyttelton	Member of Parliament for Droitwich; 1916 – 1918	Constituency abolished
Baronetage of the United Kingdom
New creation	Baronet (of Grimley); 1918–1936	Succeeded by Maurice Huntington-Whiteley
