= Geoffrey Collings =

British trade unionist and political activist

Arthur Geoffrey Collings (6 June 1913 – 1996) was a British trade unionist and political activist.

Collings was educated at the Stationers' Company's School and Birkbeck College, becoming an industrial chemist. He found work with London Transport, and joined the Railway Clerks' Association (RCA). In 1929, he joined the Labour Party, and in 1932 he was a founder member of the Socialist League. He represented the Labour Party on Esher Urban District Council for some years.

The RCA became the Transport Salaried Staffs' Association (TSSA), and Collings was elected to its executive committee in 1945, serving until 1951. On the executive, he argued in favour of equal pay and opportunities for women and black workers. He represented the union on the London Trades Council, and from 1948 to 1949, he served as the trades council's chair. He also represented the union on the executive of the National Federation of Professional Workers. From 1946, he was a member of the Labour Research Department's executive, serving as vice-chair in 1948/49.

At the 1950 and 1951 general elections, Collings stood in Pudsey, taking second place on each occasion.

Trade union offices
Preceded by Jock Tiffin	Chair of the London Trades Council; 1948–1950	Succeeded by E. D. Sheehan
