= Giles Shaw =

British politician (1931–2000)

Sir Giles Shaw

Member of Parliament for Pudsey
- In office 28 February 1974 – 8 April 1997
- Preceded by: Joseph Hiley
- Succeeded by: Paul Truswell

Personal details
- Born: 16 November 1931 York
- Died: 12 April 2000 (aged 68)
- Party: Conservative
- Spouse: Dione Ellison
- Children: Henrietta, Victoria, Christopher
- Education: University of Cambridge
- Occupation: Member of parliament

Sir John Giles Dunkerley Shaw (16 November 1931 – 12 April 2000), known as Giles Shaw, was a British Conservative Party politician.

Shaw was born in York, the son of an engineer. He was educated at Sedbergh School and St. John's College, Cambridge, joining the Conservative association and becoming President of the Cambridge Union for the Michaelmas term, 1954.

On returning to York, he became an executive of the confectionery firm Rowntree Mackintosh, rising to advertising manager, then marketing director. He was an advertising manager and chairman of the Conservative Divisional Executive.

Shaw contested Kingston upon Hull West at the 1966 general election. He was subsequently the Member of Parliament (MP) for Pudsey from 1974 until he retired at the 1997 general election.

Shaw held a number of junior ministerial posts during the first eight years of the Thatcher administration: Parliamentary Under-Secretary, Northern Ireland Office (1979–1981); Parliamentary Under-Secretary, Department of Environment (1981–1983); Parliamentary Under-Secretary, Department of Energy (1983–1984); Minister of State, Home Office (1984–1986); and Minister of State, Department of Trade and Industry (1986–1987).

Shaw left the front-bench following the 1987 general election and was knighted that year in recognition of his service as a Member of Parliament.

Sir Giles was also elected treasurer of the 1922 Committee in 1988, the Speaker's Panel of Chairmen and later became Chairman of the Science and Technology Committee. He was Chairman of Governors at Sedbergh School from 1992 to 1997.

Shaw was also appointed director of both British Steel plc and Yorkshire Water in 1990, and became the 2nd Chairman of Broadcasters' Audience Research Board Ltd (BARB) in 1997.

Sir Giles Shaw...was probably the most popular man of his time in the Commons. This might have been put beyond question in 1992, when many on all sides wanted him as speaker, but the Tory cabinet insisted on backing his senior, Peter Brooke. Consequently, 74 Tory MPs, led by John Biffen, voted for Betty Boothroyd as the first woman speaker.
-Andrew Roth, in Shaw's obituary in The Guardian.

Shaw died of a stroke aged 68.

== Sources ==
- Times Guide to the House of Commons, Times Newspapers Limited, 1992 and 1997 editions.
- Leigh Rayment's Historical List of MPs
