= Moorhouse Affair =

Military Confrontation between the UK and Egypt

The Moorhouse Affair was a military confrontation between the United Kingdom and Egypt over the abduction and murder of British Second Lieutenant Anthony Moorhouse by an Egyptian mob in Port Said, Egypt, following the end of British military operations in the 1956 Suez Crisis. Moorhouse was one of the 8 British military personnel abducted by Egyptian civilians in Port Said that were killed in the period between the ceasefire and final withdrawal of British troops from Egypt.

== Biography ==
Anthony Gerard Moorhouse (18 December 1935 – 13 December 1956), a graduate of Stonyhurst College, was a Second Lieutenant on National Service in the 1st Battalion, West Yorkshire Regiment. His father, Francis Gerard Moorhouse, owned a jam-manufacturing company in Leeds, Yorkshire, Moorhouse's Jam. Moorhouse was stationed in Port Said after the 7 November 1956 ceasefire.

== Abduction ==
On 10 December 1956 Moorhouse had led a raid in Port Said on the premises of an Egyptian dentist and arrested seven Egyptian commandos. On the following morning, he returned to the scene alone and without military authority where he was surrounded in his army Land Rover by a crowd of Egyptians, one of whom took his pistol and looting personal belongings like his watch and chain. He was overpowered and driven off in a civilian car later located by British forces.

Lieutenant General Hugh Stockwell, the British Task Force commander and commander of the British Army's II Corps, ordered a house-to-house search of a five-block area and for all males over the age of 15 found there to be detained and questioned. The searches were unsuccessful in locating the missing officer.

The United Nations also made efforts to obtain information on Moorhouse's disappearance. On 22 December 1956 the kidnappers allowed Major Wiks, a Norwegian UN officer, to see a man in a British uniform claiming he was Moorhouse. After the encounter the UN officer reported that Moorhouse was "alive and well". However, uncertainty remained.

== Confirmation of death ==
A family friend and former army colleague of the Egyptian President Gamal Abdel Nasser, the British Member of Parliament Colonel Cyril Banks, travelled to Cairo in an effort to establish the missing officer's fate. On Christmas Eve, 24 December 1956 he finally had a meeting with President Nasser who told him that Moorhouse had died of suffocation when held captive.

On 31 December 1956, Dag Hammarskjöld, the Secretary-General of the United Nations received a report from the Egyptian Army that, after his capture, Moorhouse was kept with the intention of exchanging him for Egyptian prisoners. When British troops began to search for him he had been locked in a small metal cupboard; his captors returned once to feed him but, as the search intensified, they felt unsafe to return and he was left for two days. When they finally returned they found him dead, apparently from suffocation and brutal torture. The kidnappers later buried him in the house where he had been kept prisoner.

According to an account made in 2006 by one of the Egyptian kidnappers, Moorhouse was captured and then taken to a safe house where he was trussed, gagged, tortured and hidden under the floor. It was never intended to kill him, but to kidnap him as a hostage to exchange against prisoners held by the British in Port Said. It was confirmed that Moorhouse was held as a hostage with the intention of exchanging him for Egyptian prisoners. However, he was left alone and bound by his abductors for four days due to the curfew and constant British patrols, and when they returned they found him dead. He was then buried secretly in the Port Said graveyard. In late December 1956, Banks returned to Egypt to recover Moorhouse's body, and the British government asked the UN and Swiss government to mediate to recover the body with the Egyptian authorities.

The Egyptians complied with the UN request on 2 January 1957 and, on 4 January 1957, Moorhouse's body was flown to Naples, Italy, for formal identification.

On 5 January 1957, British pathologists from Scotland Yard formally identified the body as that of Moorhouse. The body was flown back to the UK on 6 January 1957.

== Memorial ==
Lieutenant Moorhouse was buried with full military honours in Lawnswood Cemetery in Leeds on 10 January 1957 after a service at Leeds Cathedral. His memory is marked in the name of a road, 'Moorhouse Close', in Chester, Cheshire. A small plaque refers to his "heroic death during the Suez Crisis" at the right entrance to this cul-de-sac.

== Political and social aftermath ==
This tragedy "aroused furious anger in Britain" and became "a national symbol of Egyptian deceit". It led to widespread criticism of the Eden government from opponents of the Suez invasion. When residents of Port Said planned to turn the house where Moorhouse had been held into a museum, British public opinion was further inflamed. Moorhouse's death also raised questions regarding President Nasser's authority and the effectiveness of the United Nations.

== Depiction in drama ==
Moorhouse's death was the model for the fate of "Mick Rice" in John Osborne's The Entertainer. It was also the inspiration for the depiction of Leslie Williams, a British conscript soldier seized by the IRA in Brendan Behan's play The Hostage.
