= Bertha Mason (suffragist) =

British activist and suffragist

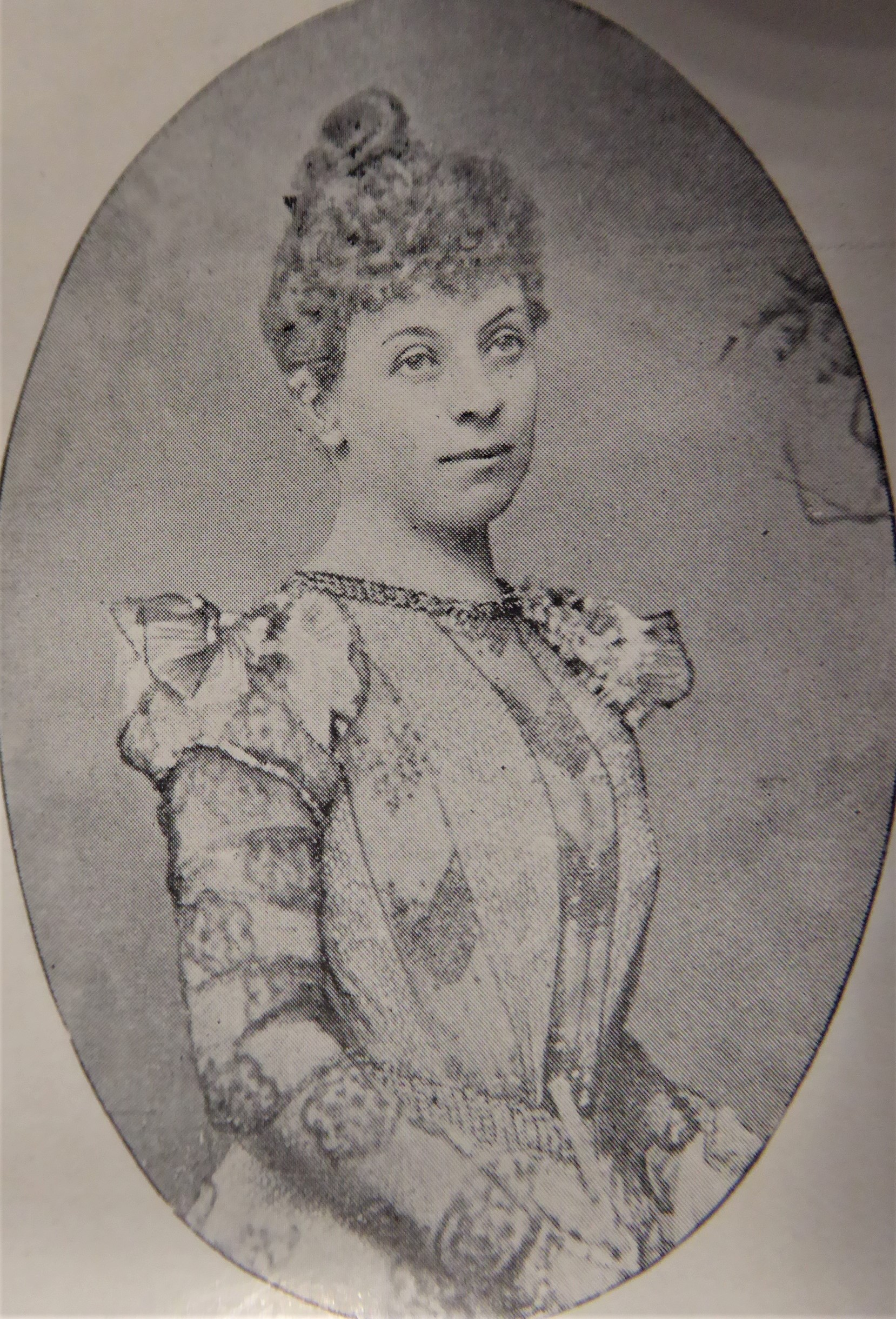
A 1901 picture of Mason published in the Souvenir of the Autumnal Meetings of the Congregational Union of England, Wales, Scotland and Ireland

Bertha Mason (1855–1939) was an English suffragist and temperance campaigner born in Ashton-under-Lyne. Influenced by her father Hugh Mason, a Member of Parliament for the Liberal Party, she became a dedicated activist, serving as a committee member in many groups including the National Union of Women's Suffrage Societies and National Council of Women of Great Britain. Her book The Story of the Women Suffrage Movement was published in 1912. After serving in the British Committee of the French Red Cross in the First World War, she resumed her activism with the Women's Local Government Society and joined the National Council of Women of Great Britain. She died in London.

== Early life ==
Bertha Mason was born in Ashton-under-Lyne in 1855, the eldest daughter of Betsey (née Buckley) and Hugh Mason. Her father owned a mill and she was raised in relative comfort, although her mother died in 1861. Little is known of her education. Mason grew up in at atmosphere in which issues such as Liberalism, temperance and women's enfranchisement were openly discussed. As Liberal Member of Parliament for Ashton-under-Lyne, her father had proposed a resolution on women being able to vote in 1880 and he was associated with the Central Committee for Women's Suffrage, the Manchester Society for Women's Suffrage and the Manchester and Salford Temperance Union.

== Career ==
Mason wrote in her 1912 book The Story of the Women Suffrage Movement that she herself became a suffragist in 1890. By 1894, she was participating in both the Manchester National Society for Women's Suffrage and the Central National Society for Women's Suffrage. When the former group changed into the North of England Women's Suffrage Society, she acted as chairperson until 1903. From around 1902 onwards, she was involved in the National Union of Women's Suffrage Societies (NUWSS). She was also politically active more generally, taking on various committee roles in the Ashton Women's Liberal Association, the Lancashire and Cheshire Union of Women's Liberal Associations and the Lancashire Union of the British Women's Temperance Association. She was the first woman to be elected to Ashton-under-Lyne's board of guardians. Addressing the junior members of the British Women's Temperance Association in 1903, she told her audience "You are citizens of a State, whether you know it or not" and emphasised that "You will come to realise that the housing of the poor, the protection of infant life, the safeguarding of the workers, the care of the aged, the mentally afflicted, the education of the young, are your business, your concern."

Mason moved to London in 1904, living at 9 Hyde Park Place. She took on committee roles in the Women's Local Government Society and the Central Society for Women's Suffrage. Her salon became a place for meetings attended by activists such as Kate Frye. She prepared a magic lantern slide show and lecture which was summarised as "pictures of unique interest of the forerunners of the movement, the advance guard, the parliamentary champions, the present day workers, election incidents". She toured NUWSS groups, giving the lecture in places such as Bath, Croydon and Mansfield, and it then became the basis of her book. Mason included photographs made by Lilias Ashworth Hallett. A review published in 1912 in The Common Cause magazine called it "a concise history of the leading events of the history of Women's Suffrage". Alongside books by Helen Blackburn and Millicent Fawcett, The Story of the Women Suffrage Movement is regarded as an official account of the Suffragist movement, focusing on a slow, continuous progression towards victory which neglects to mention some of the conflictual issues. Universal women's suffrage was encoded in law in the UK in 1928.

During the First World War, Mason joined the British Committee of the French Red Cross working in kitchens in France. After the war, she resumed her activism, becoming chairperson of the Women's Local Government Society. She also served on the National Council of Women of Great Britain and the Women's Advisory Council of the League of Nations.

== Death and legacy ==
Mason had moved out of London to Hindhead, Surrey, but died on 8 July 1939 at the Hans Crescent Hotel in Knightsbridge, London. She was cremated at Golders Green crematorium and had expressed the wish for her ashes to be scattered near where her sister Edith lay in the cemetery at Worthenbury in Wales. She left £15,405 (equivalent to about £1,206,402 in 2023) in her will and made a legacy to the Ashton-under-Lyne District Infirmary and Children's Hospital, where two beds were kept in memory of her father and sister.
