= Stuart Andrew =

British politician (born 1971)

The Right Honourable Stuart Andrew MP
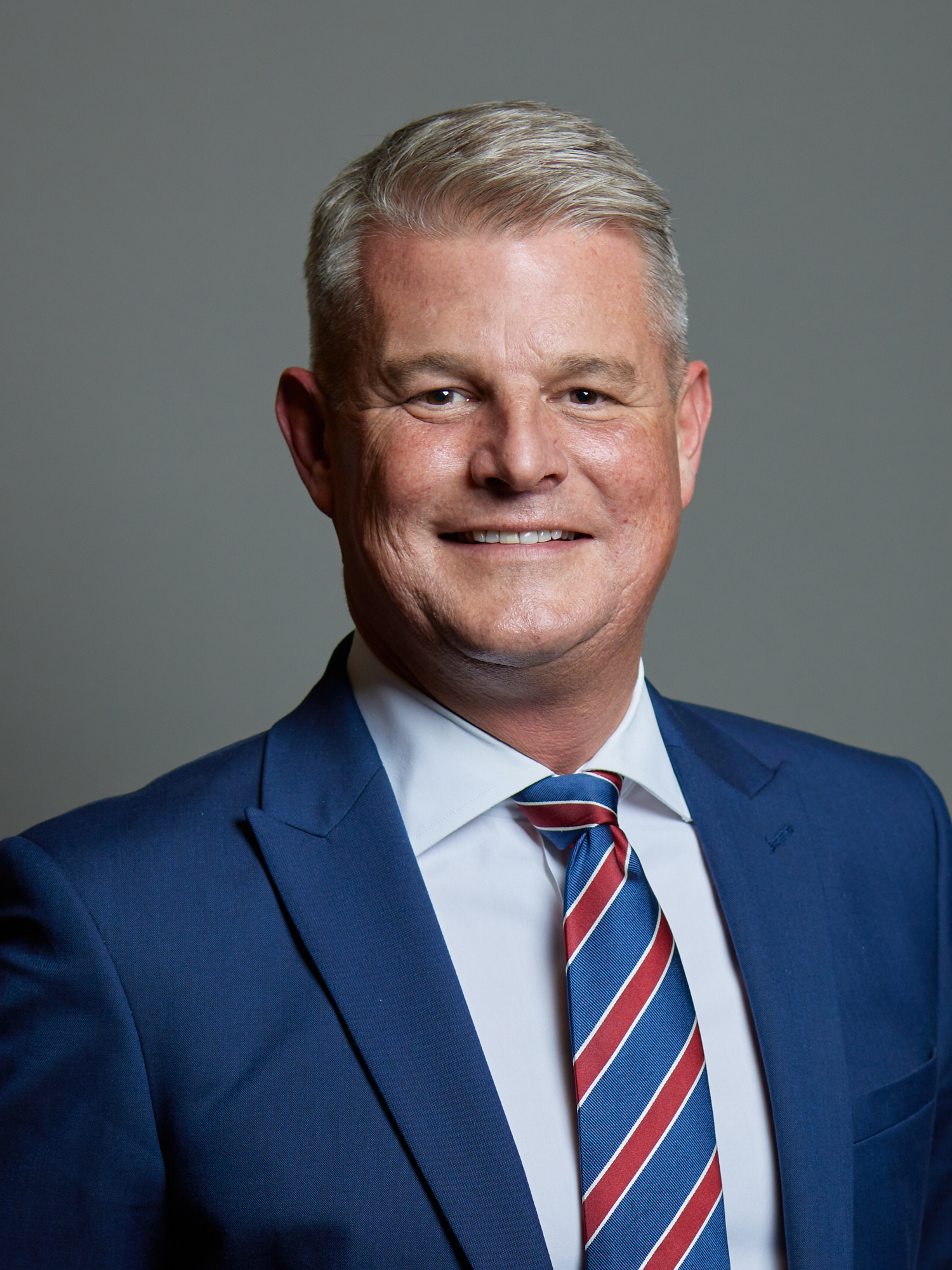
- Official portrait, 2021

Shadow Secretary of State for Health and Social Care
- In office 22 July 2025 – 31 August 2026
- Leader: Kemi Badenoch
- Preceded by: Edward Argar
- Succeeded by: Damian Hinds

Shadow Secretary of State for Culture, Media and Sport
- In office 5 November 2024 – 22 July 2025
- Leader: Kemi Badenoch
- Preceded by: Julia Lopez
- Succeeded by: Nigel Huddleston

Opposition Chief Whip in the House of Commons
- In office 8 July 2024 – 3 November 2024
- Leader: Rishi Sunak
- Preceded by: Alan Campbell
- Succeeded by: Rebecca Harris
Ministerial positions
Minister of State for Prisons and Probation
In office 8 July 2022 – 7 September 2022
Prime Minister	Boris Johnson
Preceded by	Victoria Atkins
Succeeded by	Rob Butler
Minister of State for Housing
In office 8 February 2022 – 6 July 2022
Prime Minister	Boris Johnson
Preceded by	Chris Pincher
Succeeded by	Marcus Jones
Junior ministerial positions
Parliamentary Under-Secretary of State for Sport, Gambling and Civil Society (Note: Parliamentary Under-Secretary of State for Sport, Arts and Ceremonials (September to October 2022). Parliamentary Under-Secretary of State for Sport, Tourism and Civil Society (October 2022 to February 2023).)
In office 8 September 2022 – 5 July 2024
Prime Minister	Liz Truss; Rishi Sunak
Preceded by	Nigel Huddleston
Succeeded by	The Baroness Twycross (Gambling); Stephanie Peacock (Sport and Civil Society)
Parliamentary Under-Secretary of State for Equalities
In office 27 October 2022 – 5 July 2024
Prime Minister	Rishi Sunak
Preceded by	The Baroness Stedman-Scott
Succeeded by	Anneliese Dodds (Women and Equalities)
Government Deputy Chief Whip Treasurer of the Household
In office 13 February 2020 – 8 February 2022
Prime Minister	Boris Johnson
Preceded by	Amanda Milling
Succeeded by	Chris Pincher
Vice-Chamberlain of the Household
In office 28 July 2019 – 13 February 2020
Prime Minister	Boris Johnson
Preceded by	Craig Whittaker
Succeeded by	Marcus Jones
Parliamentary Under-Secretary of State for Defence Procurement
In office 19 July 2018 – 28 July 2019
Prime Minister	Theresa May
Preceded by	Guto Bebb
Succeeded by	Anne-Marie Trevelyan
Parliamentary Under-Secretary of State for Wales
In office 9 January 2018 – 19 July 2018
Prime Minister	Theresa May
Preceded by	Guto Bebb
Succeeded by	Mims Davies

Member of Parliament
- Incumbent
- Assumed office 4 July 2024
- Preceded by: Chris Heaton-Harris
- Constituency: Daventry
- Majority: 3,012 (5.7%)
- In office 6 May 2010 – 30 May 2024
- Preceded by: Paul Truswell
- Succeeded by: Constituency abolished
- Constituency: Pudsey

Personal details
- Born: Stuart James Andrew; 25 November 1971 (age 54) Isle of Anglesey, Wales
- Party: Conservative (before 1998, 2000–present)
- Other political affiliations: Labour (1998–2000)
- Education: Ysgol David Hughes
- Website: stuartandrew.org.uk

Stuart James Andrew (born 25 November 1971) is a British Conservative Party politician who served as Shadow Secretary of State for Health and Social Care from July 2025 to August 2026. He has also been the Member of Parliament (MP) for Daventry in Northamptonshire since 2024. He was previously MP for Pudsey in West Yorkshire from 2010 until the constituency was abolished before the July 2024 election.

Andrew was born in Anglesey, Wales. He was a councillor on Wrexham County Borough Council from 1995 to 1999. Elected as a Conservative, he defected to the Labour Party in 1998 before rejoining the Conservative Party in 2000. He was a councillor on Leeds City Council from 2003 to 2010. He was elected for Pudsey at the 2010 general election. He was a Parliamentary Under-Secretary of State under Theresa May. He served in four positions under Boris Johnson, as Vice-Chamberlain of the Household from 2019 to 2020; Government Deputy Chief Whip in the House of Commons from 2020 to 2022; Minister of State for Housing from February to July 2022, and Minister of State for Prisons and Probation from July to September 2022. He was appointed Parliamentary Under-Secretary of State for Sport, Tourism, Heritage and Civil Society in September 2022 by Liz Truss. He was retained in the position and was also appointed Parliamentary Under-Secretary of State for Equalities by Rishi Sunak in October 2022.

== Early life and career ==
Stuart Andrew was born on 25 November 1971 in Anglesey. He was state educated at Ysgol David Hughes in Menai Bridge. After leaving school he worked for the Department of Social Security. In 1994 he took a job with the British Heart Foundation, before roles at Hope House Children's Hospice and East Lancashire Hospice. Before being elected to Parliament he led the fundraising team for Martin House Hospice.

Andrew was first elected as a Conservative councillor to represent the Maesydre ward on Wrexham County Borough Council in 1995. He stood unsuccessfully as a parliamentary candidate for Wrexham in the 1997 general election. In 1998, he left the Conservatives and defected to the Labour Party, citing issues with the "direction of the party". Andrew was re-elected as a Labour councillor in 1999, but resigned from the council later in the year.

== Parliamentary career ==
Andrew was elected to Parliament as MP for Pudsey in the 2010 general election with 38.5% of the vote and a majority of 1,659.

Andrew served on the Welsh Affairs Select Committee between November 2010 and November 2012.

On 22 February 2012 Andrew was headbutted and punched in a House of Commons bar during a disturbance created by Scottish Labour MP Eric Joyce, tweeting the next day that "I'm OK". Joyce was charged with common assault, with a fourth charge added on 9 March, and he was fined £3,000 and ordered to pay £1,400 in compensation to Andrew and other victims, but not given a custodial sentence. In a statement before the House of Commons on 12 March 2012, Joyce apologised personally to his victims, stated that he had resigned from the Labour Party, and that he intended to complete his current term as an MP but not seek re-election.

In September 2012, Andrew brought forward a bill that would create a new power for governors to "destroy or otherwise dispose of any unauthorised property found within a prison or an escort vehicle". The bill was supported both by the government and the Labour Party, with Shadow Secretary of State for Justice Sadiq Khan saying he backed the bill.

During the debates on the Marriage (Same Sex Couples) Act 2013, which he subsequently voted for, Andrew responded to comments from Gerald Howarth about "aggressive homosexuals" by telling of a time when he had been attacked in the street and beaten unconscious "because of who and what I am".

At the 2015 general election, Andrew was re-elected as MP for Pudsey with an increased vote share of 46.4% and an increased majority of 4,501.

In January 2016, Andrew was one of 72 MPs who voted down an amendment in Parliament on rental homes being "fit for human habitation" who were themselves landlords who derived an income from a property.

In May 2016, it emerged that Andrew was one of a number of Conservative MPs being investigated by police in the 2015 general election party spending investigation, for allegedly spending more than the legal limit on constituency election campaign expenses. However, in May 2017, the Crown Prosecution Service said that while there was evidence of inaccurate spending returns, it did not "meet the test" for further action.

Andrew supported Brexit in the 2016 referendum.

Andrew was appointed vice-chairman of the Conservative Party, with particular responsibility for cities, on 23 September 2016.

At the snap 2017 general election, Andrew was again re-elected, with an increased vote share of 47.4% and a decreased majority of 331. At the 2019 general election, Andrew was again re-elected, with an increased vote share of 48.8% and an increased majority of 3,517.

Andrew was elected to Parliament as MP for Daventry at the 2024 general election with 33.7% of the vote and a majority of 3,012.

=== Parliamentary Under-Secretary of State for Wales and for Defence Procurement ===
Andrew became Assistant Whip (HM Treasury) in June 2017 and Parliamentary Under-Secretary (Wales Office) in January 2018, before moving to be Parliamentary Under-Secretary (Ministry of Defence).

In July 2019, Andrew wrote to Bradford Council to oppose plans to introduce a new link road in south east Bradford, impacting the Pudsey constituency.

In October 2019, on both 14 October and 19 December, Andrew was ceremonially taken hostage by the Queen at Buckingham Palace for the duration of her speeches to Parliament.

=== Treasurer of the Household ===
In the February 2020 reshuffle he was appointed Deputy Chief Whip and promoted to Treasurer of the Household.

On 10 September 2020, Andrew stood in for Jacob Rees-Mogg as Acting Leader of the House of Commons in Business Questions as Rees-Mogg was self-isolating awaiting the results of a COVID-19 test on his son.

During the COVID-19 pandemic emergency arrangements, he held a large number of proxy votes for other Conservative MPs, and at one stage in 2021 personally controlled 333 votes (a majority) in the House of Commons. He did not always cast these proxy votes the same way, instead following the instructions of individual MPs.

He was sworn of the Privy Council of the United Kingdom in 2021.

=== Minister of State for Housing ===
In a cabinet reshuffle on 8 February 2022, Andrew was appointed Minister of State for Housing.

On 6 July 2022, Andrew resigned from the role of Minister of State for Housing due to the scandals involving the former Conservative Party leader and Prime Minister Boris Johnson, most recently the Chris Pincher scandal. He stated that "There comes a time when you have to look at your own personal integrity and that time is now. Therefore, given recent events I have no other choice to resign. Our party, particularly our members and more importantly our great country, deserve better".

=== Parliamentary Under-Secretary of State for Sport, Tourism, Heritage and Civil Society and for Equalities ===
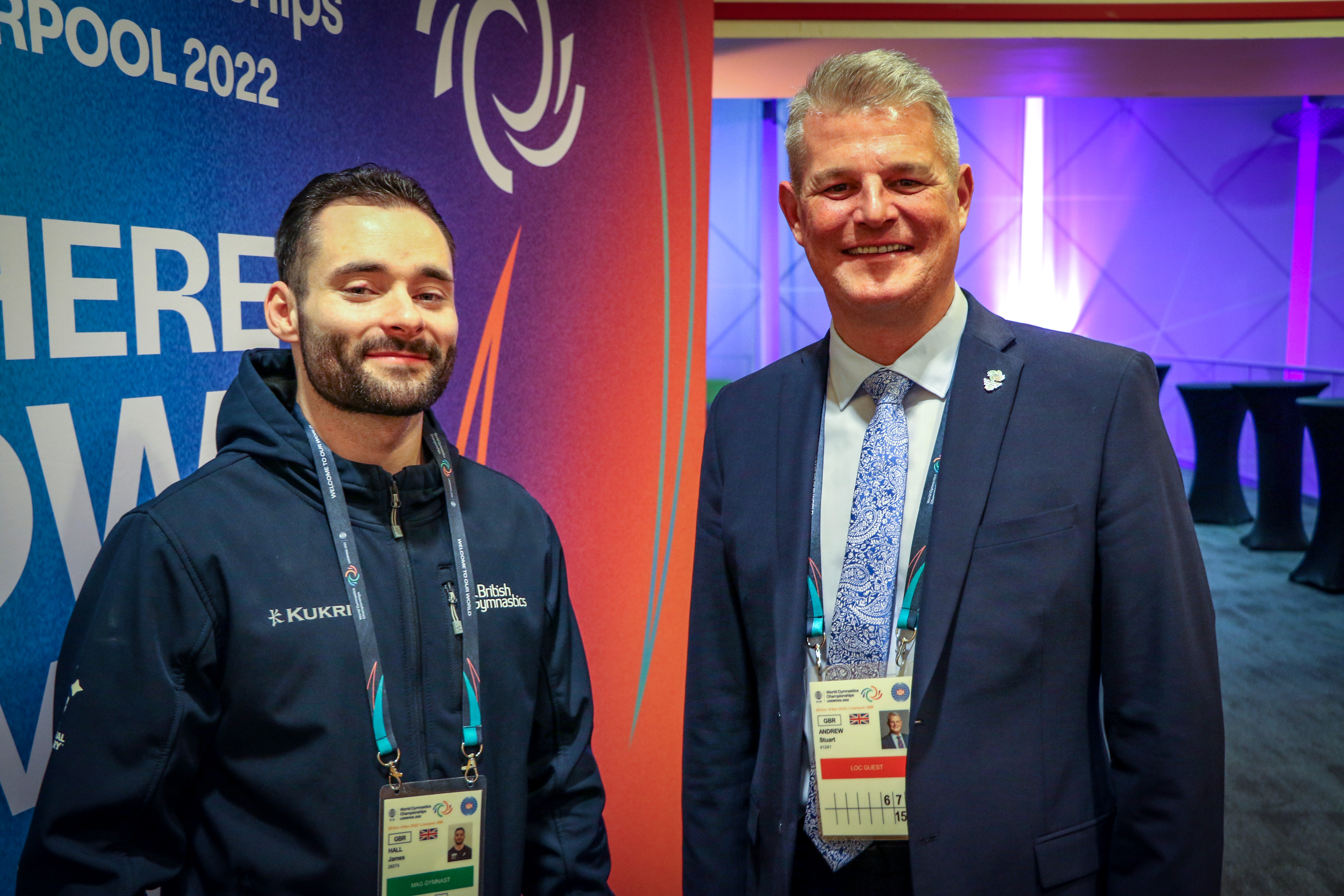
Stuart Andrew with Gymnast James Hall during a visit to the 2022 World Artistic Gymnastics Championships in Liverpool

On 8 September 2022, Andrew was appointed as Parliamentary Under-Secretary of State for Sport, Tourism, Heritage and Civil Society. His role includes

- Minister for Equalities
- Sport
- Tourism
- Civil Society (including loneliness)
- Youth
- Ceremonials (including the Coronation)
- Events including Eurovision, Unboxed, City of Culture
- Arts and Heritage in the Commons.

On 27 October 2022, Andrew was appointed to a second ministerial position, as Parliamentary Under-Secretary of State for Equalities.

=== Opposition ===
Andrew served as the Shadow Secretary of State for Health and Social Care from July 2025 to August 2026, under Kemi Badenoch. He returned to the backbenches in August 2026 following the 2026 British shadow cabinet reshuffle.

== Personal life ==
Andrew is openly gay and a patron of LGBT+ Conservatives. During the 2022 FIFA World Cup, Andrew expressed his support for the OneLove campaign by publicly wearing an armband at the England vs Wales game.

== Electoral history ==
General election 2019: Pudsey
Party	Candidate	Votes	%	±%
Conservative	Stuart Andrew	26,453	48.8	+1.4
Labour	Jane Aitchison	22,936	42.3	−4.4
Liberal Democrats	Ian Dowling	3,088	5.7	+2.4
Green	Quinn Daley	894	1.6	New
Yorkshire	Bob Buxton	844	1.6	−0.5
Majority		3,517	6.5	+5.8
Turnout		54,215	74.1	−0.2
Conservative hold		Swing	+2.9	

General election 2024: Daventry
Party	Candidate	Votes	%	±%
Conservative	Stuart Andrew	17,872	33.7	−30.8
Labour	Marianne Kimani	14,860	28.0	+10.2
Reform	Scott Cameron	10,636	20.0	New
Liberal Democrats	Jonathan Harris	6,755	12.7	−0.4
Green	Clare Slater	2,959	5.6	+1.0
Majority		3,012	5.7	−39.8
Turnout		53,082	65.9	−8.2
Registered electors		80,879		
Conservative hold		Swing	−19.9	

== Notes ==
Parliament of the United Kingdom
Preceded by Paul Truswell	Member of Parliament for Pudsey; 2010–2024	Constituency abolished
Preceded by Chris Heaton-Harris	Member of Parliament for Daventry; 2024–present	Incumbent
Political offices
Preceded by Guto Bebb	Parliamentary Under-Secretary of State for Wales; 2018	Succeeded by Mims Davies
Preceded by Guto Bebb	Parliamentary Under-Secretary of State for Defence Procurement; 2018–2019	Succeeded by Anne-Marie Trevelyan
Preceded by Craig Whittaker	Vice-Chamberlain of the Household; 2019–2020	Succeeded by Marcus Jones
Preceded by Amanda Milling	Treasurer of the Household; Government Deputy Chief Whip in the House of Commons; 2020–2022	Succeeded by Chris Pincher
Preceded by Chris Pincher	Minister of State for Housing; 2022	Succeeded by Marcus Jones
Preceded by Sir Alan Campbell	Opposition Chief Whip in the House of Commons; 2024	Succeeded by Rebecca Harris
Party political offices
Preceded by Amanda Milling	Conservative Deputy Chief Whip in the House of Commons; 2020–2022	Succeeded by Chris Pincher
Preceded by Simon Hart	Conservative Chief Whip of the House of Commons; 2024	Succeeded by Rebecca Harris
