= Pudsey (constituency) =

Parliamentary constituency in the United Kingdom, 1885–1918 & 1950–2024

- Former borough constituency for the House of Commons
- 2010–2024 boundary of Pudsey in West Yorkshire

- Location of West Yorkshire within England
- County: West Yorkshire
- Electorate: 73,212 (December 2019)

1950–2024
- Seats: One
- Created from: Pudsey and Otley
- Replaced by: Leeds North West; Leeds West and Pudsey

1885–1918
- Seats: One
- Created from: Eastern West Riding of Yorkshire
- Replaced by: Pudsey and Otley

Pudsey was a constituency (Note: A county constituency (for the purposes of election expenses and type of returning officer).) represented in the House of Commons of the UK Parliament. (Note: As with all constituencies, the constituency elects one Member of Parliament (MP) by the first past the post system of election at least every five years.)

Since 1997 campaigns in the seat have resulted in a minimum of 33.1% of votes at each election consistently for the same two parties' choice for candidate, and the next-placed party's having fluctuated between 3.1% and 20.8% of the vote — such third-placed figures achieved much higher percentages in 1992 and in previous decades.

The result in 2017 was the 23rd-closest nationally (of 650 seats).

The seat was abolished prior to the 2024 general election and replaced by parts of two other constituencies.

== Constituency profile ==
From 1979 the constituency was a bellwether. The constituency covered suburban settlements to the upland west and north-west of Leeds, including Pudsey, Farsley, Horsforth, Yeadon and Guiseley with low dependency on social housing, average workers' income close to the British average and low unemployment. This was, from its 1950 recreation, a win for candidates who were members of the Conservative Party before a member of the Labour Party gained it in the New Labour landslide of 1997.

== Boundaries ==
Map of boundaries 2010-2024

Historic boundaries

The Redistribution of Seats Act 1885 provided that the constituency should consist of:

- the municipal borough of Leeds save for those parts in the Leeds constituencies (Note: As the seats of Leeds Central, Leeds East, Leeds North, Leeds South and Leeds West were also created in 1885, this by inference did not refer to the whole of the municipal borough of Leeds.)
- the Parishes of Drighlington, Hunsworth, and Tong,
- so much of the Parishes of Calverley with Farsley and Pudsey as are not included in the Municipal Borough of Bradford,
- the Parishes of Churwell, Gildersome, Horsforth and Rawdon in the Sessional Division of Skyrack.

Post-1950 boundaries

1950–1983: The Municipal Borough of Pudsey, and the Urban Districts of Aireborough and Horsforth.

1983–2010: The City of Leeds wards of Aireborough, Horsforth, Pudsey North, and Pudsey South. The constituency boundaries remained unchanged.

2010–2024: The City of Leeds wards of Calverley and Farsley, Guiseley and Rawdon, Horsforth, and Pudsey.

== History ==
1885–1950

The Pudsey constituency was first created in 1885 by the Redistribution of Seats Act 1885, and it was first used in the general election that year. The seat had formerly been part of Eastern West Riding of Yorkshire constituency. On 1 June 1908 George Whiteley voluntarily resigned from Parliament (Note: By accepting appointment as Steward of the Manor of Northstead.) resulting in a by-election in the constituency.

The constituency was abolished in 1918 and replaced by the constituency of Pudsey and Otley until 1950.

1950-2024

The constituency was recreated for contesting in the 1950 general election and existed until 2024.

Nomenclature

In their Third Periodic Review of Westminster Constituencies (1976–1983) the Boundary Commission initially suggested renaming the constituency Leeds West, with the existing Leeds West constituency in turn being renamed Leeds West Central. This was opposed at local enquiries where the current name was retained.

== Abolition ==
Further to the completion of the 2023 Periodic Review of Westminster constituencies, the seat was abolished for the 2024 general election. The Calverley and Farsley, and Pudsey wards were combined with the Armley, Bramley and Stanningley wards from the also abolished constituency of Leeds West to form Leeds West and Pudsey. The Guiseley and Rawdon, and Horsforth wards were transferred to a reconfigured Leeds North West constituency.

== Members of Parliament ==
Election	Member	Party
1885	Briggs Priestley	Liberal
1900	George Whiteley	Liberal
1908 by-election	John James Oddy	Conservative
Jan 1910	Frederick Ogden	Liberal
1918	constituency abolished: see Pudsey & Otley	
1950	constituency re-created	
1950	Cyril Banks	Conservative
1959	Joseph Hiley	Conservative
Feb 1974	Giles Shaw	Conservative
1997	Paul Truswell	Labour
2010	Stuart Andrew	Conservative
2024	Constituency abolished	

== Election results 1950-2024 ==
=== Elections in the 1950s ===
General election 1950: Pudsey
Party	Candidate	Votes	%	±%
Conservative	Cyril Banks	18,269	41.33	
Labour	Geoffrey Collings	18,205	41.18	
Liberal	Richard Wainwright	7,731	17.49	
Majority		64	0.15	
Turnout		49,729	88.89	
Conservative win (new seat)				

General election 1951: Pudsey
Party	Candidate	Votes	%	±%
Conservative	Cyril Banks	24,138	53.74	+12.41
Labour	Geoffrey Collings	20,782	46.26	−5.08
Majority		3,356	7.48	+7.33
Turnout		50,521	88.91	+0.02
Conservative hold		Swing		

General election 1955: Pudsey
Party	Candidate	Votes	%	±%
Conservative	Cyril Banks	20,445	47.71	−6.03
Labour	Barry A Payton	15,881	37.06	−9.20
Liberal	Richard Wainwright	6,526	15.23	New
Majority		4,564	10.65	+3.18
Turnout		50,175	85.41	−3.50
Conservative hold		Swing		

General election 1959: Pudsey
Party	Candidate	Votes	%	±%
Conservative	Joseph Hiley	22,752	50.09	+2.38
Labour	Vincent P Richardson	16,241	35.76	−1.30
Liberal	Joseph Snowden	6,429	14.15	−1.08
Majority		6,511	14.33	+3.68
Turnout		52,285	86.87	+1.46
Conservative hold		Swing	+1.84	

=== Elections in the 1960s ===
General election 1964: Pudsey
Party	Candidate	Votes	%	±%
Conservative	Joseph Hiley	21,581	46.50	
Labour	Bernard P Atha	16,100	34.69	
Liberal	J Trevor Wilson	8,732	18.81	
Majority		5,481	11.81	
Turnout		53,939	86.05	
Conservative hold		Swing		

General election 1966: Pudsey
Party	Candidate	Votes	%	±%
Conservative	Joseph Hiley	20,782	44.65	
Labour	Eric Brierley	18,410	39.55	
Liberal	Robert HJ Rhodes	7,353	15.80	
Majority		2,372	5.10	
Turnout		55,860	83.32	
Conservative hold		Swing		

=== Elections in the 1970s ===
General election 1970: Pudsey
Party	Candidate	Votes	%	±%
Conservative	Joseph Hiley	24,308	49.23	4.58
Labour	J Mann	18,313	37.09	−2.46
Liberal	GVJ Pratt	6,754	13.68	−2.12
Majority		5,995	12.14	
Turnout		62,403	79.12	−4.2
Conservative hold		Swing	N/A	

General election February 1974: Pudsey
Party	Candidate	Votes	%	±%
Conservative	Giles Shaw	21,750	39.53	−9.70
Liberal	SJ Cooksey	18,011	32.73	19.05
Labour	K Targett	15,267	27.74	−9.35
Majority		3,739	6.80	
Turnout		64,788	84.94	+5.82
Conservative hold		Swing		

General election October 1974: Pudsey
Party	Candidate	Votes	%	±%
Conservative	Giles Shaw	20,180	39.51	−0.02
Liberal	SJ Cooksey	15,599	30.54	−2.19
Labour	K Targett	15,293	29.94	+2.20
Majority		4,581	8.97	
Turnout		65,354	78.15	−6.79
Conservative hold		Swing		

General election 1979: Pudsey
Party	Candidate	Votes	%	±%
Conservative	Giles Shaw	24,591	45.11	+5.60
Liberal	SJ Cooksey	15,852	29.08	−1.46
Labour	PD McBride	13,727	25.18	−4.76
Ecology	P Lewenz	340	0.62	New
Majority		8,739	16.03	+7.06
Turnout		67,853	80.34	2.19
Conservative hold		Swing		

=== Elections in the 1980s ===
General election 1983: Pudsey
Party	Candidate	Votes	%	±%
Conservative	Giles Shaw	24,455	45.7	+0.6
Liberal	Julian Cummins	19,141	35.8	+6.7
Labour	Susan Price	9,542	17.8	−7.3
Independent	R Smith	387	0.7	New
Majority		5,314	9.9	−6.1
Turnout		55,525	75.8	−4.5
Conservative hold		Swing	-3.0	

General election 1987: Pudsey
Party	Candidate	Votes	%	±%
Conservative	Giles Shaw	25,457	45.5	−0.2
Liberal	Julian P.F. Cummins	19,021	34.0	−1.8
Labour	Neil Taggart	11,461	20.5	+2.7
Majority		6,436	11.5	+1.6
Turnout		55,939	78.0	+2.2
Conservative hold		Swing	+0.8	

=== Elections in the 1990s ===
General election 1992: Pudsey
Party	Candidate	Votes	%	±%
Conservative	Giles Shaw	25,067	44.2	−1.3
Labour	Arthur Giles	16,095	28.4	7.9
Liberal Democrats	David Shutt	15,153	26.7	−7.3
Green	JL Wynne	466	0.8	New
Majority		8,972	15.8	+4.3
Turnout		56,781	80.1	+2.1
Conservative hold		Swing	-4.6	

General election 1997: Pudsey
Party	Candidate	Votes	%	±%
Labour	Paul Truswell	25,370	48.1	+19.7
Conservative	Peter Bone	19,163	36.3	−7.9
Liberal Democrats	Jonathan Brown	7,375	14.0	−12.7
Referendum	David Crabtree	823	1.6	New
Majority		6,207	11.8	N/A
Turnout		52,731	74.3	−5.8
Labour gain from Conservative		Swing	+13.2	

=== Elections in the 2000s ===
General election 2001: Pudsey
Party	Candidate	Votes	%	±%
Labour	Paul Truswell	21,717	48.1	0.0
Conservative	John Procter	16,091	35.6	−0.7
Liberal Democrats	Stephen Boddy	6,423	14.2	+0.2
UKIP	David Sewards	944	2.1	New
Majority		5,626	12.5	+0.7
Turnout		45,175	63.3	−11.0
Labour hold		Swing		

General election 2005: Pudsey
Party	Candidate	Votes	%	±%
Labour	Paul Truswell	21,261	45.8	−2.3
Conservative	Pamela Singleton	15,391	33.1	−2.5
Liberal Democrats	James Keeley	8,551	18.4	+4.2
UKIP	David Daniel	1,241	2.7	+0.6
Majority		5,870	12.7	+0.2
Turnout		46,444	66.0	+2.7
Labour hold		Swing	+0.1	

=== Elections in the 2010s ===
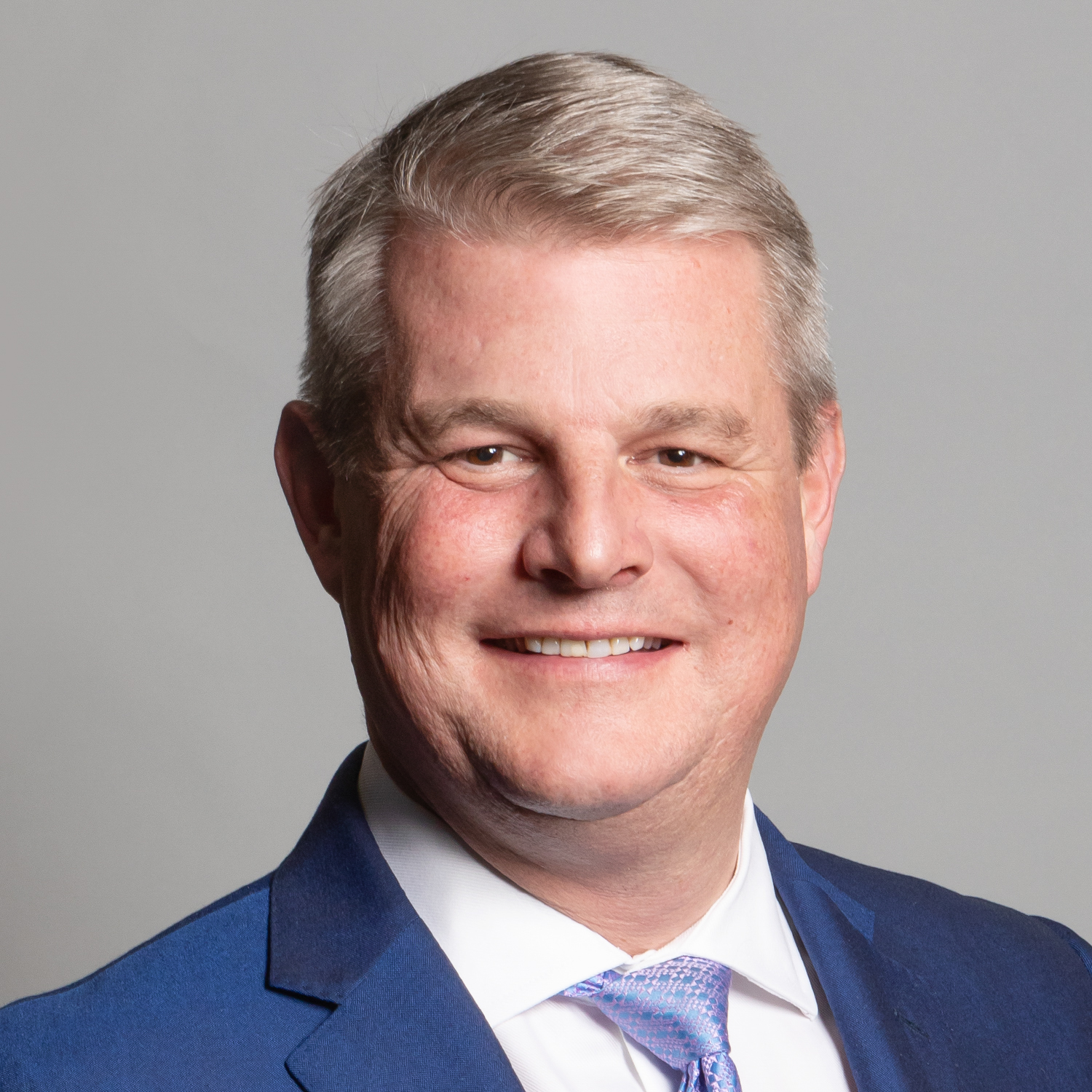
Stuart Andrew

General election 2010: Pudsey
Party	Candidate	Votes	%	±%
Conservative	Stuart Andrew	18,874	38.5	+4.8
Labour	Jamie Hanley	17,215	35.1	−10.3
Liberal Democrats	Jamie Matthews	10,224	20.8	+2.7
BNP	Ian Gibson	1,549	3.2	New
UKIP	David Dews	1,221	2.5	−0.3
Majority		1,659	3.4	N/A
Turnout		49,083	70.9	+4.9
Conservative gain from Labour		Swing	+7.6	

General election 2015: Pudsey
Party	Candidate	Votes	%	±%
Conservative	Stuart Andrew	23,637	46.4	+7.9
Labour	Jamie Hanley	19,136	37.6	+2.5
UKIP	Roger Tattersall	4,689	9.2	+6.7
Liberal Democrats	Ryk Downes	1,926	3.8	−17.0
Green	Claire Allen	1,539	3.0	New
Majority		4,501	8.8	+5.4
Turnout		50,927	72.2	+1.3
Conservative hold		Swing	+2.75	

The 2015 election saw a record-equal total of five candidates stand in Pudsey.

General election 2017: Pudsey
Party	Candidate	Votes	%	±%
Conservative	Stuart Andrew	25,550	47.4	+1.0
Labour Co-op	Ian McCargo	25,219	46.7	+9.1
Liberal Democrats	Allen Nixon	1,761	3.3	−0.5
Yorkshire	Bob Buxton	1,138	2.1	New
Independent	Michael Wharton	291	0.5	New
Majority		331	0.7	−7.9
Turnout		53,959	74.3	+2.1
Conservative hold		Swing	-4.2	

The 2017 election saw the Green Party standing aside after talks with the Labour candidate, to seek to avert Andrew's re-election, but ultimately Andrew was narrowly reelected.

General election 2019: Pudsey
Party	Candidate	Votes	%	±%
Conservative	Stuart Andrew	26,453	48.8	+1.4
Labour	Jane Aitchison	22,936	42.3	−4.4
Liberal Democrats	Ian Dowling	3,088	5.7	+2.4
Green	Quinn Daley	894	1.6	New
Yorkshire	Bob Buxton	844	1.6	−0.5
Majority		3,517	6.5	+5.8
Turnout		54,215	74.1	−0.2
Conservative hold		Swing	+2.9	

== Election results 1885-1918 ==
=== Elections in the 1880s ===
Briggs Priestley

General election 24 November-18 December 1885: Pudsey
Party	Candidate	Votes	%	±%
Liberal	Briggs Priestley	6,363	61.2	
Conservative	William Duncan	4,039	38.8	
Majority		2,324	22.4	
Turnout		10,402	86.8	
Registered electors		11,989		
Liberal win (new seat)				

General election 1–27 July 1886: Pudsey
Party	Candidate	Votes	%	±%
Liberal	Briggs Priestley	5,207	56.3	−4.9
Conservative	Arthur Rucker	4,036	43.7	+4.9
Majority		1,171	12.6	−9.8
Turnout		9,243	77.1	−9.7
Registered electors		11,989		
Liberal hold		Swing	−4.9	

=== Elections in the 1890s ===
General election July 1892: Pudsey
Party	Candidate	Votes	%	±%
Liberal	Briggs Priestley	5,527	52.9	−3.4
Liberal Unionist	Edwin Woodhouse	4,924	47.1	+3.4
Majority		603	5.8	−6.8
Turnout		10,451	74.9	−2.2
Registered electors		13,954		
Liberal hold		Swing	−3.4	

General election 13 July–17 August 1895: Pudsey
Party	Candidate	Votes	%	±%
Liberal	Briggs Priestley	5,540	52.2	−0.7
Liberal Unionist	Andrew Fairbairn	5,070	47.8	+0.7
Majority		470	4.4	−1.4
Turnout		10,610	77.0	+2.1
Registered electors		13,774		
Liberal hold		Swing	−0.7	

=== Elections in the 1900s ===
George Whiteley

General election Wednesday 10 October 1900: Pudsey
Party	Candidate	Votes	%	±%
Liberal	George Whiteley	5,973	52.4	+0.2
Conservative	E.B. Faber	5,424	47.6	−0.2
Majority		549	4.8	+0.4
Turnout		11,397	78.2	+1.2
Registered electors		14,573		
Liberal hold		Swing	+0.2	

General election Saturday 20 January 1906: Pudsey
Party	Candidate	Votes	%	±%
Liberal	George Whiteley	7,043	66.5	+14.1
Liberal Unionist	C W Ford	3,541	33.5	−14.1
Majority		3,502	33.0	+28.2
Turnout		10,584	70.2	−8.0
Registered electors		15,069		
Liberal hold		Swing	+14.1	

By-Election Saturday 20 June 1908: Pudsey
Party	Candidate	Votes	%	±%
Conservative	John Oddy	5,444	45.1	+11.6
Liberal	Frederick Ogden	5,331	44.2	−22.3
Independent Labour	J. W. Benson	1,291	10.7	New
Majority		113	0.9	N/A
Turnout		12,066	78.3	+8.1
Registered electors		15,410		
Conservative gain from Liberal		Swing	+17.0	

=== Elections in the 1910s ===
General election Saturday 22 January 1910: Pudsey
Party	Candidate	Votes	%	±%
Liberal	Frederick Ogden	7,358	55.4	−11.1
Conservative	John Oddy	5,934	44.6	+11.1
Majority		1,424	10.8	−22.2
Turnout		15,071	88.2	+18.0
Registered electors		15,071		
Liberal hold		Swing	−11.1	

General election Saturday 10 December 1910: Pudsey
Party	Candidate	Votes	%	±%
Liberal	Frederick Ogden	6,518	52.5	−2.9
Conservative	John Oddy	5,888	47.5	+2.9
Majority		630	5.0	−5.8
Turnout		15,071	82.3	−5.9
Registered electors		15,071		
Liberal hold		Swing	−2.9	

== See also ==
- List of parliamentary constituencies in West Yorkshire
