= Frederick Ogden (politician) =

Frederick Ogden (11 May 1871 – 24 April 1933) was a British Liberal Party politician. He was elected at the January 1910 general election as Member of Parliament (MP) for the Pudsey division of the West Riding of Yorkshire, and held the seat until the constituency was abolished at the 1918 general election. He contested the 1929 general election in Bradford South, but did not win the seat.

He was a native of Leeds and carried on business in a boot factory. He was on the City Council as chairman of the waterworks committee. He was a Primitive Methodist and also a local preacher in the body.

Parliament of the United Kingdom
Preceded by John James Oddy	Member of Parliament for Pudsey; January 1910 – 1918	Constituency abolished see Pudsey & Otley
