= George Whiteley, 1st Baron Marchamley =

British politician

The Right Honourable The Lord Marchamley PC
- George Whiteley MP, circa 1906

Government Chief Whip in the House of Commons; Parliamentary Secretary to the Treasury
- In office 12 December 1905 – 1 June 1908
- Monarch: Edward VII
- Prime Minister: Henry Campbell-Bannerman; H. H. Asquith
- Preceded by: Alexander Acland-Hood
- Succeeded by: Jack Pease

Member of Parliament for Pudsey
- In office 10 October 1900 – 1 June 1908
- Preceded by: Briggs Priestley
- Succeeded by: John James Oddy

Member of Parliament for Stockport
- In office 22 February 1893 – 10 October 1900
- Preceded by: Louis John Jennings
- Succeeded by: Joseph Leigh

Personal details
- Born: 30 August 1855
- Died: 21 October 1925 (aged 70) London, England, UK
- Party: Liberal (1900–1925)
- Other political affiliations: Conservative (Before 1900)
- Spouse: Alice Tattersall (d. 1913)
- Relations: Herbert (brother)
- Parent: George Whiteley (father)

George Whiteley, 1st Baron Marchamley PC (30 August 1855 – 21 October 1925) was a British Conservative turned Liberal Party politician. He served as Chief Whip between 1905 and 1908 in the Liberal administrations of Sir Henry Campbell-Bannerman and H. H. Asquith.

== Background ==
Whiteley was the eldest son of George Whiteley, JP, of Woodlands, Blackburn, Lancashire. His brother, Herbert, also became a Member of Parliament.

He was partner in a cotton-spinning firm and had major brewing interests.

== Political career ==
As a Conservative, Whiteley was a Member of Parliament (MP) for Stockport from 1893 to 1900. He then joined the Liberal Party, in whose interest he was elected M.P. in 1900 for Pudsey, serving until 1908. He became Parliamentary Secretary to the Treasury (Chief Whip) when the Liberals came to power in December 1905, and was made a Privy Counsellor in 1907. On 1 June 1908, he resigned from Parliament by accepting appointment as Steward of the Manor of Northstead. It was thought that his retirement was due entirely to insomnia, from which he had suffered for a long period. On 3 July 1908 he was raised to the peerage as Baron Marchamley, of Hawkstone in the County of Shropshire. He contributed occasionally in the House of Lords, making his last speech in November 1919. The Complete Peerage summarised his oratory as: "A ready speaker, with a somewhat caustic humour, he was on the platform an effective asset to the Liberal Party".

He was made a JP for the counties of Hampshire in 1900, and Shropshire in 1908.

== Family ==
Lord Marchamley married Alice, only child of William Tattersall, JP, of Quarry Bank, Blackburn, and St Anthony's Milnthorpe, in 1881. In 1907, he purchased, from the 4th Viscount Hill, Hawkstone Hall and its estates in Shropshire, later selling them in 1923. His own title was taken from the village of Marchamley, near Hawkstone Hall, and after Hawkstone itself.

Lady Marchamley died in 1913. Marchamley survived her by twelve years and died at his home, 29 Princes Gardens, London, after an operation in October 1925, aged 70. He was buried in the churchyard of St Luke's, Weston-under-Redcastle, Shropshire. He was succeeded in the barony by his son, William.

== Arms ==
Coat of arms of George Whiteley, 1st Baron Marchamley
Crest A stag’s head couped Argent attired Or holding in the mouth a bell Gold. Escutcheon Per fesse dancettée Sable and Gules in chief a pale Or thereon three bars of the second in base a fleur de lis Argent. Supporters Dexter a griffin sejant sinister a hawk both per fess Gules and Sable armed and membered Or each charged on the fesse line with a fleur-de-lis Argent. Motto Live To Live

== Gallery ==
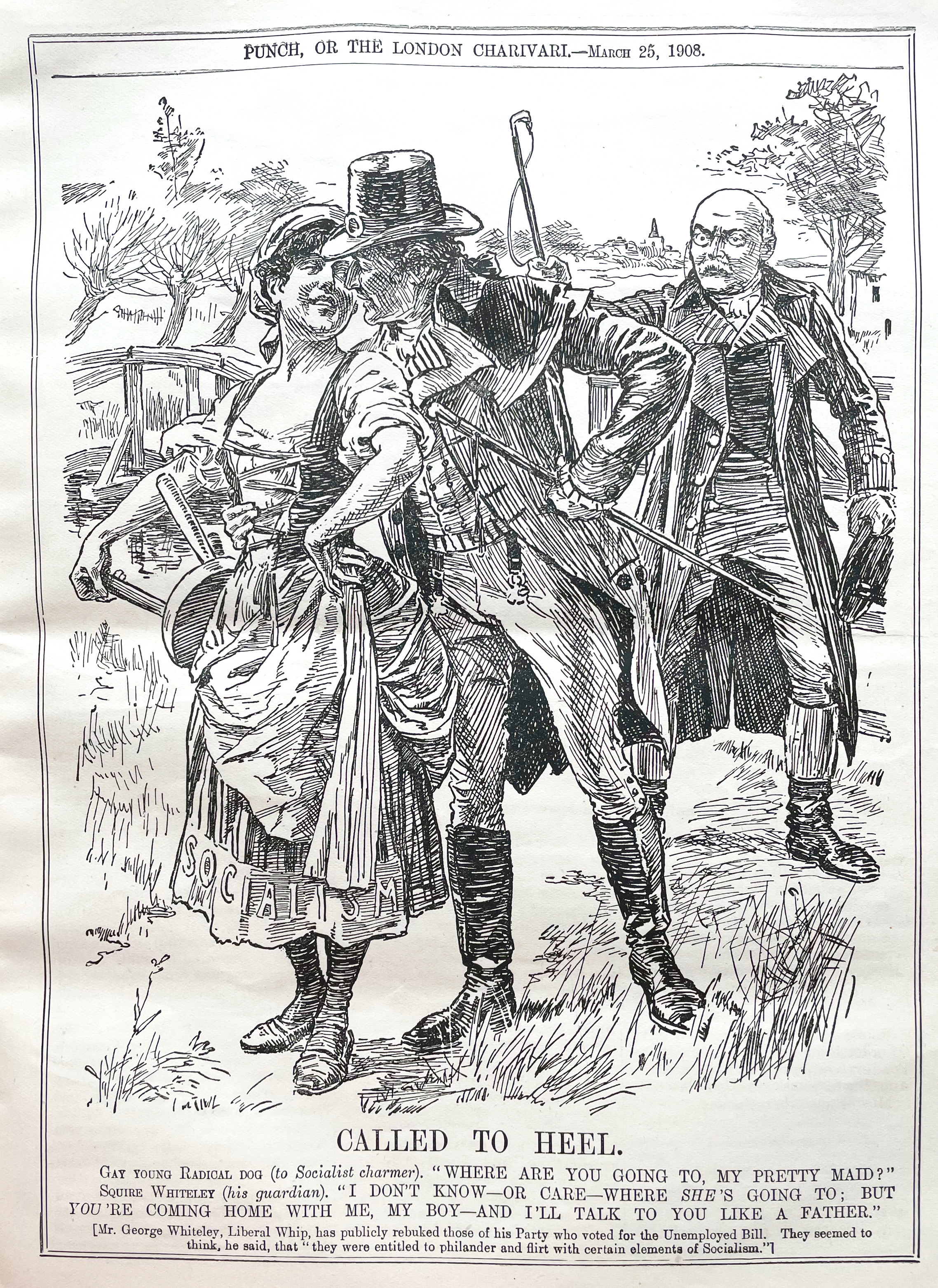
Punch cartoon depicting Liberal versus Labour voting issues arising from a comment by George Whiteley (caricature on right)

Parliament of the United Kingdom
Preceded by Louis John Jennings; Sir Joseph Leigh	Member of Parliament for Stockport; 1893–1900; With: Sir Joseph Leigh 1893–1895; Beresford Valentine Melville 1895–1900	Succeeded by Beresford Valentine Melville; Sir Joseph Leigh
Preceded by Briggs Priestley	Member of Parliament for Pudsey; 1900–1908	Succeeded by John James Oddy
Political offices
Preceded by Sir Alexander Acland-Hood, Bt	Government Chief Whip in the House of Commons; Parliamentary Secretary to the Treasury; 1905–1908	Succeeded by Jack Pease
Party political offices
Preceded by Herbert Gladstone	Liberal Chief Whip; 1905–1908	Succeeded by Jack Pease
Peerage of the United Kingdom
New creation	Baron Marchamley; 1908–1925	Succeeded by William Whiteley
