= 2016–2019 United Kingdom railway strikes =

Railway industrial action in the UK between 2016 and 2019

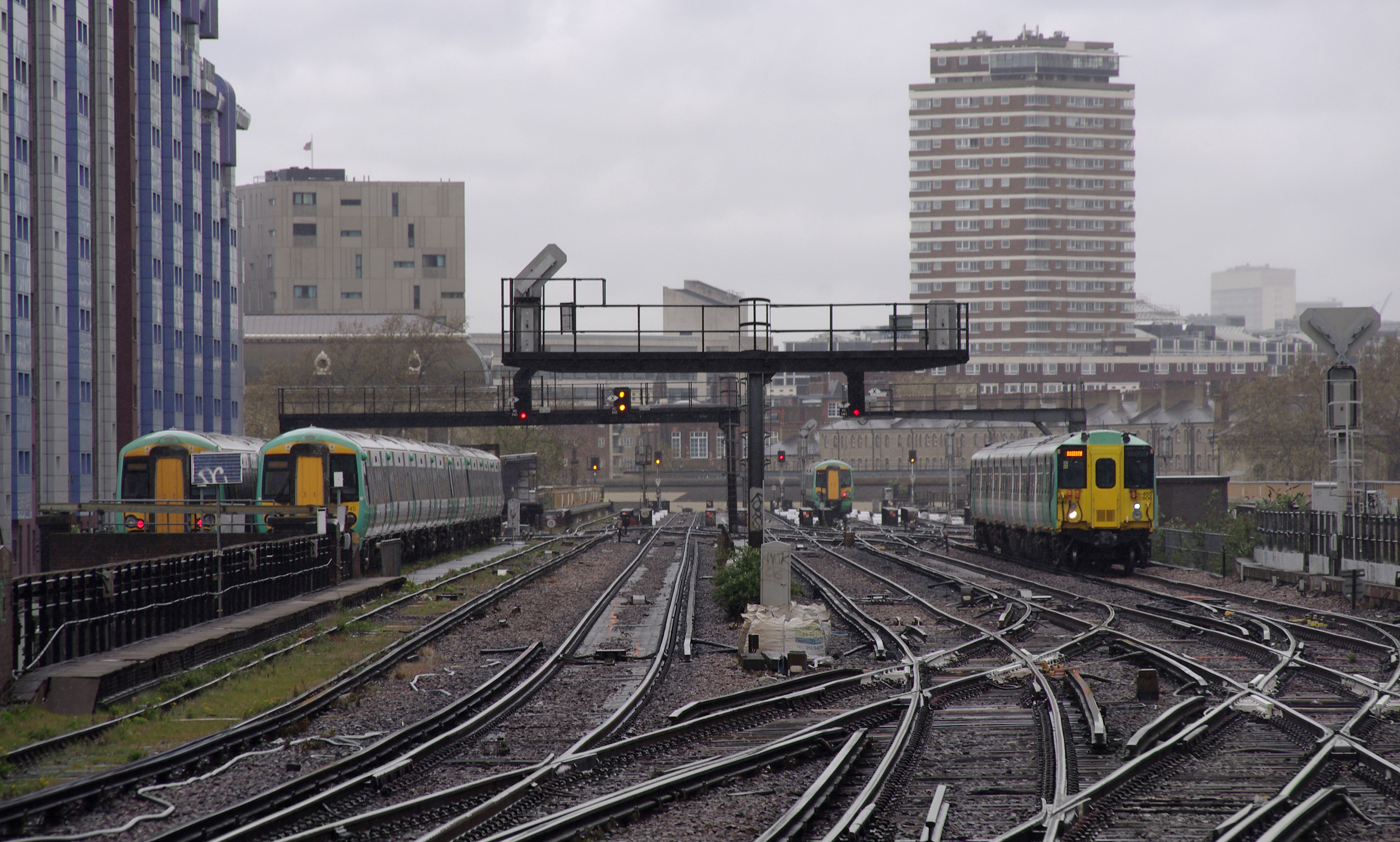
- Class 377 and Class 455 (right) trains operated by Southern
- Date: 26 April 2016 – December 2019
- Location: United Kingdom (Great Britain only)
- Caused by: The proposed introduction of driver-only operation on Great Britain's railway network.; Later factors also include disputes over pay, redundancies, and working hours.
- Methods: Strikes and protests

Parties
UK train operating companies: Abellio ScotRail; CrossCountry; Eurostar; Govia Thameslink Railway; Gatwick Express; Great Northern; Southern; Thameslink; Great Western Railway; Greater Anglia; Merseyrail; Arriva Rail North; Southeastern (Govia); South Western Railway (previously South West Trains); Virgin Trains West Coast; Virgin Trains East Coast; Network Rail; Department for Transport	Rail unions: Associated Society of Locomotive Engineers and Firemen (ASLEF); National Union of Rail, Maritime and Transport Workers (RMT); Transport Salaried Staffs' Association (TSSA)

Lead figures
Theresa May, Prime Minister; Chris Grayling, Secretary of State for Transport (Patrick McLoughlin until 14 July 2016)	Mick Cash, RMT General Secretary; Manuel Cortes, TSSA General Secretary; Mick Whelan, ASLEF General Secretary

Between 2016 and 2019, major industrial action in the form of periodic strikes and protests took place on the national railway network of the island of Great Britain in the United Kingdom. The dispute centred on the planned introduction of driver-only operation (DOO) by several train operating companies, transferring the operation of passenger train doors from the guard to the driver. Later strikes also included disputes over pay rates, planned redundancies and working hours. NI Railways operating Northern Ireland's rail network did not strike. Some of the disputes continued into early 2020, and were resolved by negotiations during the pandemic without further action. Driver-only operation was however proposed again during the 2022–2023 United Kingdom railway strikes, leading to subsequent disputes.

Supporters claimed that DOO will save costs and shorten journey times, although opponents claim that the scheme is unsafe to passengers as drivers may not have as good visibility of the train doors as guards, who are able to step out onto the platform. Opponents also claim that the scheme could lead to hundreds of job losses to train guards, although several train operating companies have denied this, stating that guards will be redeployed to an otherwise equivalent role on board.

The strikes started on 26 April 2016, initially on Govia Thameslink Railway's Southern trains, and have since spread to eight more rail franchises across the country. The strikes were led initially by Mick Cash, general secretary of the National Union of Rail, Maritime and Transport Workers (RMT); the Associated Society of Locomotive Engineers and Firemen (ASLEF) joined the strikes in November 2016, followed by the Transport Salaried Staffs' Association (TSSA) in January 2018. Opposition to the strikes was led by then Prime Minister Theresa May and Secretary of State for Transport Chris Grayling, who labelled the strikes as "appalling" and "palpable nonsense".

== Background ==
In April 2016, Southern introduced a new method of door operation, with control of the doors moving from the conductor to the driver. Southern also proposed that, following the changes to the door operation, conductors would take on an "on-board supervisor role", which would let them concentrate on passengers more than doors, but the RMT and ASLEF described this as an attempt to make conductors unnecessary, and would also be unsafe. However, the rail safety regulator, the Rail Safety and Standards Board, said that "We have 30 years of data which we have analysed. We have found that the driver performing the task does not increase the risk to passengers at all." The BBC suggested that the RMT was particularly worried about the new method of operation because if trains could run without conductors any strike action they took would be ineffectual. As a result of this, the RMT and ASLEF unions went on strike over the changes, causing severe disruption to Southern services.

== Industrial action ==
The strikes began on 26 April 2016, as Southern conductors who were members of the RMT walked out on strike for 24 hours. Industrial action spread nationally across eight further franchises, peaking in the second half of 2017.

On 17 January 2017, the Trades Union Congress (TUC) announced that ASLEF had called off a three-day strike on the Southern network that was due to occur at the end of January. The overtime ban by ASLEF-affiliated Southern drivers was also suspended as talks were being held at the TUC between Govia Thameslink Railway and the union. On 2 February, the TUC announced that talks between Southern and ASLEF had in principle reached an agreement, meaning that the dispute with ASLEF had been resolved.

The Assistant General Secretary of the RMT, Steve Hedley, said of ASLEF that it was "scandalous other people think they can do a deal that affects our members" and that "we are not bound by that deal. The dispute is still on". The RMT met with Govia Thameslink Railway for further talks, but were unable to come to a final deal. The TUC-brokered agreement between ASLEF and Southern broke down the following month. When the proposed deal was put to a ballot of ASLEF's driver members on 16 February, it was overwhelmingly rejected, and industrial action resumed nationally.

=== CrossCountry ===
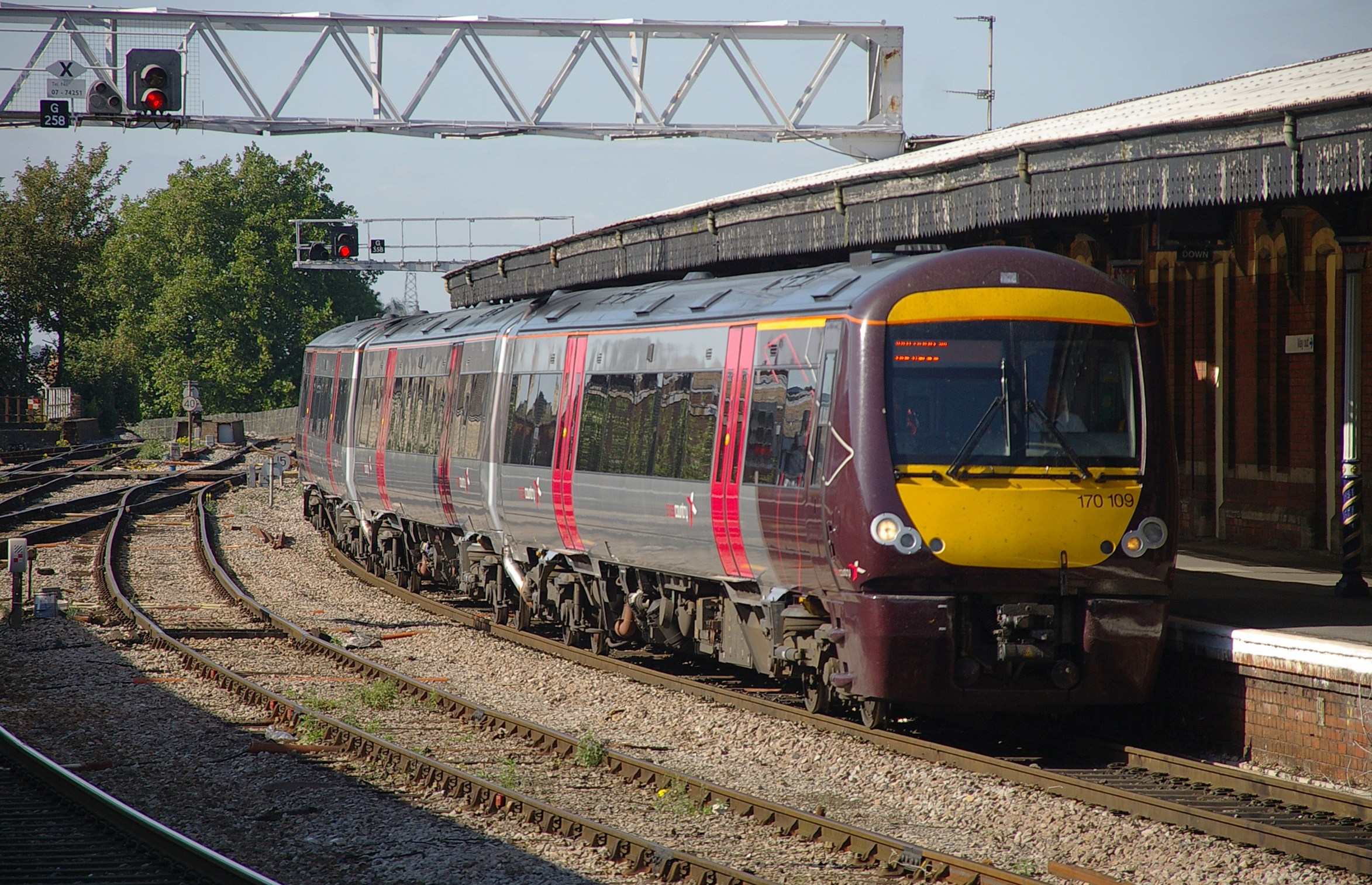
A local train operated by CrossCountry at Gloucester; during five 24-hour and two 48-hour strikes in November and December 2017, all CrossCountry local services were cancelled, while long-distance services were severely disrupted.

Industrial action by RMT-affiliated on-board train managers and senior conductors employed by Arriva CrossCountry began in late 2017, due to an industrial dispute over working hours, particularly in relation to staff rostering and Sunday working. At present, CrossCountry has no plans to introduce driver-only operation on its services.

CrossCountry staff went on strike for 24 hours on four Sundays at the end of 2017: 19 November, 26 November, 24 December and 31 December. Additionally, a 48-hour strike took place across the weekend of 9–10 December. Further strikes were called for 24 hours on 23 December and 27 December, due to what the RMT called the "shocking attitude of the company management" towards the dispute. During the strikes, CrossCountry operated a reduced hourly service on most long-distance routes between 9am and 7pm, with most services cancelled outside of these times. Local services across the Midlands did not operate.

Further strikes were called in early January 2018, scheduled for 48 hours on 20–21 January and 24 hours on 28 January. Following negotiations between the RMT and CrossCountry, the planned January strikes were called off on 11 January.

In late January, the Transport Salaried Staffs' Association (TSSA) threatened CrossCountry with industrial action after staff were offered only a 1% pay rise, compared to a 3.3% pay rise offered at other Arriva-owned train operating companies. Industrial action was planned for 26 January, but it was later called off as CrossCountry matched demands for an equal pay rise for CrossCountry employees.

=== Eurostar ===
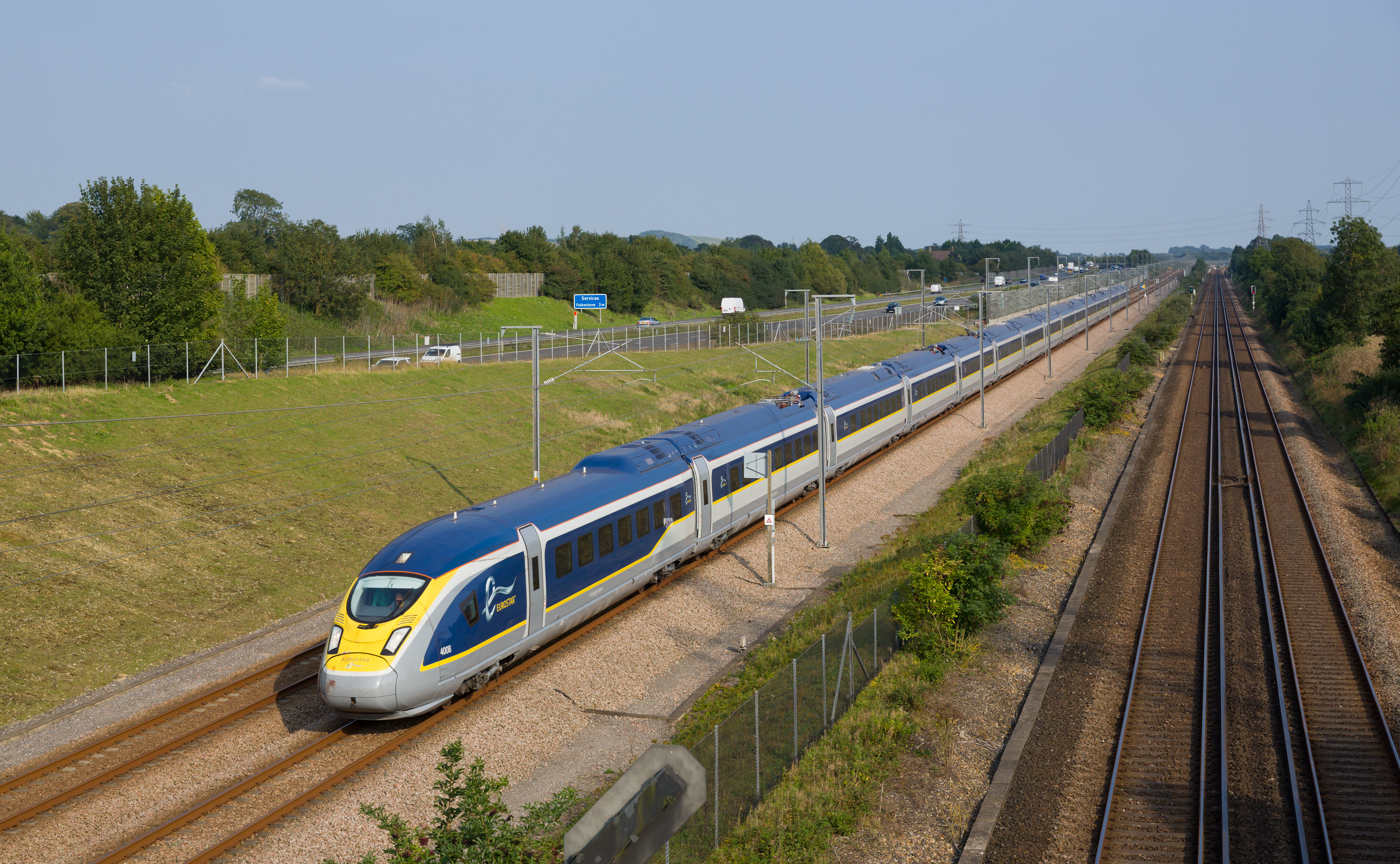
Both the RMT and TSSA planned to go on strike at Eurostar during August 2016, the former for seven days and the latter for four days. Ultimately, following a series of negotiations, only one day of the RMT strike went ahead, while all TSSA strikes were cancelled.

On 29 February 2016, the RMT opened a formal dispute with Eurostar over concerns regarding staff rostering, particularly allegations of train managers being made to work alone on some sections of route, following an incident involving a female train manager being charged with gross misconduct after refusing to operate a service which would have resulted in her running a section of the route with no other Eurostar staff members on board. Eurostar train managers based at St Pancras International station in London were balloted for potential industrial action several months later, which passed in favour of full strike action.

Seven days of strikes were announced for two weekends in August 2016: for 96 hours on 12–15 August, coinciding with the Assumption Day public holiday in Belgium and France; and for 72 hours on 27–29 August, coinciding with the late August bank holiday weekend in the United Kingdom. The TSSA announced that it would be joining both RMT strikes for 48-hour periods, covering 14–15 August and 28–29 August. During the strikes, Eurostar planned to operate a mostly normal level of service, with eight services expected to be cancelled across the four-day first strike.

The first joint RMT/TSSA strike, scheduled to last for four days amongst RMT-affiliated staff over the Assumption Day weekend, began at midnight on Friday 12 August. Following progress made in negotiations on 12 August, the RMT strike was cut short, ending after only 24 hours at midnight on 13 August. The TSSA strike, which had not yet started, was cancelled. Following further successful negotiations, the second joint RMT/TSSA strike planned for the late August bank holiday weekend was cancelled; the dispute between the RMT, the TSSA and Eurostar has now been resolved.

In October 2016, the RMT released a statement expressing concern at the prospect of 80 redundancies by Eurostar, but no further action was taken in this dispute.

=== Govia Thameslink Railway ===
Southern conductors went on strike on 26 April 2016. Afterwards, on 29 April, talks were held at the dispute resolution service Acas (Advisory, Conciliation and Arbitration Service), but this did not stop the strikes, and more were called. As a result of the strikes and a high period of staff sickness, Southern introduced an "amended timetable [that] would be a temporary measure until staffing returned to normal", with slightly reduced service levels, from 5 July. The RMT trade union said that 350 services would be cancelled every day in the new timetable; the company previously ran 2,242 daily weekday services under the standard timetable. The RMT denied that high levels of sickness were the cause of cancellations, while agreeing that there were an insufficient number of guards and drivers.

In November 2016, ASLEF held a ballot for drivers working for Southern on whether they wanted to go on strike. The strike ballot was initially suspended due to "technical difficulties", but when the ballot was re-run, drivers voted overwhelmingly to strike. As a result, on 6 December, ASLEF drivers started an indefinite overtime ban. ASLEF drivers at Southern went on strike on 13–14 and 16 December.

As the strikes would result in no trains being able to run on the Southern network, Southern's parent company, Govia Thameslink Railway, launched a High Court case in a bid to stop them, citing that they "breach customer rights under EU law". However, the court ruled that ASLEF could strike. On 13 December, the first day of ASLEF strike action, Southern took its case to the Court of Appeal, but judges upheld the decision.

The strikes by ASLEF were branded as "causing the worst rail disruption in 20 years" by The Guardian as all 2,242 daily weekday services operated by Southern were cancelled throughout the strikes. Thameslink services became much busier as a result of the strike, and other operators were accepting Southern's tickets. GTR and ASLEF held further talks at Acas, but no deal was reached, despite reports that "progress has been made" within the talks.

In December 2016, ASLEF announced that its drivers would be holding a week-long strike on the Southern network alongside RMT drivers from 9 to 16 January. On 4 January, three days of the planned one-week strike were called off, with the remaining strike dates being pushed back to the end of the month. The RMT's leader, Mick Whelan, threatened that "more strikes were to come", while Southern described ASLEF as "showing pure contempt for the travelling public".

On 5 January 2017, the Office of Rail and Road published a report into Southern's plans for driver only operation. The report declared that driver only operation on Southern services were "safe if conditions are met". As a result of the report, the government called on the unions to "end the strikes immediately", but Whelan argued that "the report does not give driver-only operation a clean bill of health".

On 11 January 2018, Govia Thameslink Railway announced that it had launched a legal challenge at the Supreme Court against ASLEF. The next day, the RMT announced that Southern conductors would walk out on strike on 23 January for 24 hours.

=== Greater Anglia ===
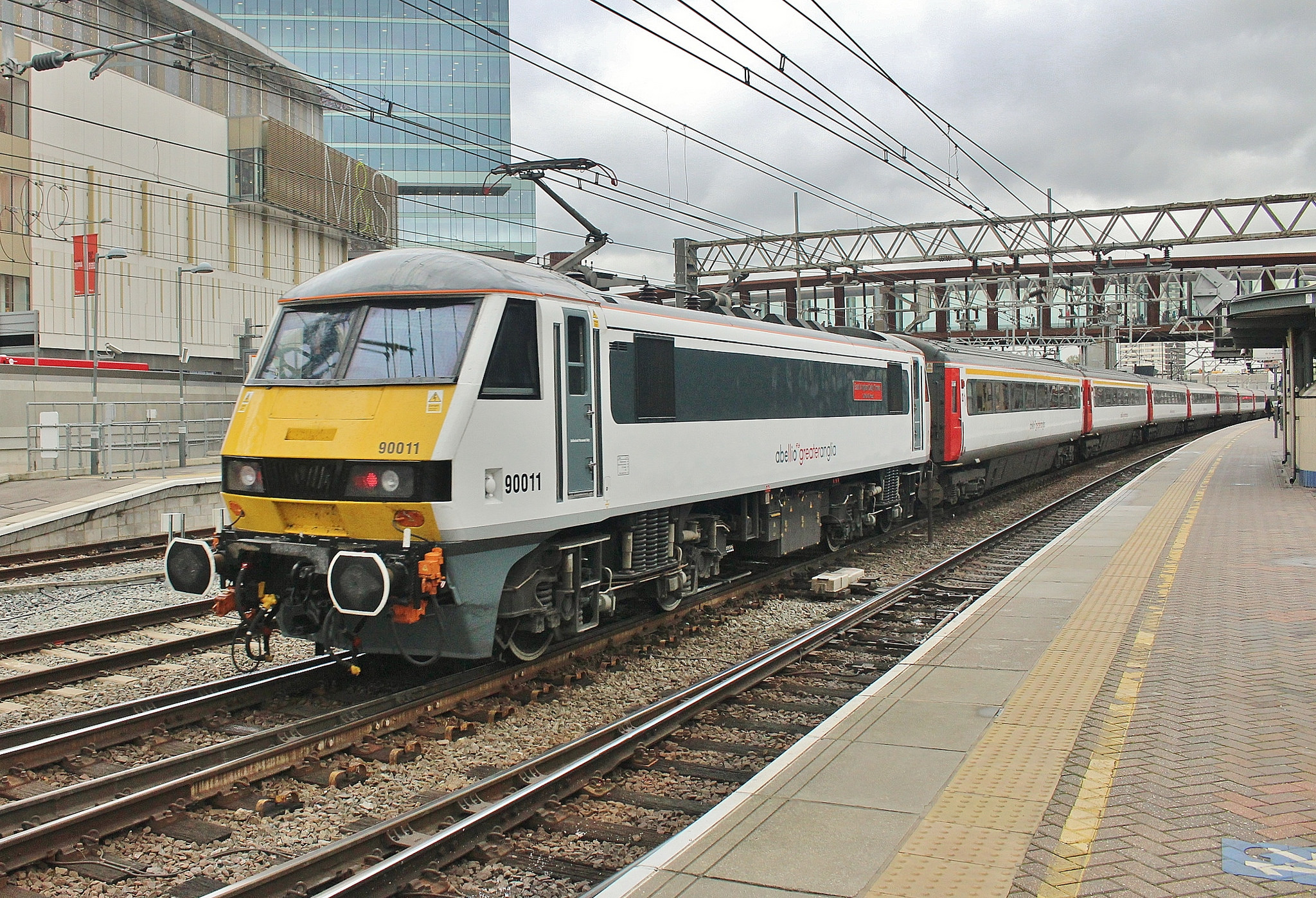
Greater Anglia has used controversial strikebreaking tactics to maintain a normal level of service during six 24-hour and one 48-hour guards' strike between October 2017 and January 2018.

In May 2017 the RMT raised concerns over plans by Greater Anglia to close 57 of its 64 station ticket offices. On 17 July, the RMT announced that it would ballot Greater Anglia staff for potential strike action over the planned ticket office closures and the introduction of driver-only operation on Greater Anglia services. The ballot was later suspended indefinitely due to progress in negotiations. The next day, the RMT started an online petition to halt the closures. On 20 July, Clive Lewis, Member of Parliament for the Norwich South constituency, tabled a motion in the House of Commons raising concerns and seeking clarification over Greater Anglia's closure plans.

On 14 August, the RMT announced that due to a breakdown in negotiations it would resume balloting Greater Anglia staff over industrial action. The ballot resulted in a vote in favour of full strike action, with the first two 24-hour strikes taking place on 3 October and 5 October. Disruption during the Greater Anglia guard strikes was limited by the company training office staff and placing them into contingency roles on trains during the strike days; the RMT criticised this move, accusing Greater Anglia of raising a 'scab army' to quash the industrial action, threatening passenger safety. In response, the RMT launched a full overtime and rest day working ban between 10 October and 6 November.

Several incidents occurred involving substitute guards, referred to as "Persons Utilised as Guards" or PUGs, during the two October strikes. The most serious occurred on 3 October, involving the 13:50 service from Peterborough to Ipswich. Upon arrival at Ipswich, the PUG unlocked the doors on the wrong side of the train, resulting in many passengers disembarking onto the tracks. Nobody was injured, although the RMT claimed that passenger safety was "jeopardised". Further minor incidents involving improperly-trained PUGs occurred on trains at Cromer and Colchester on 3 October, resulting in the RMT alerting the Office of Rail and Road (ORR, the rail safety regulator), over Greater Anglia's actions. The ORR issued an interim report on 20 October, identifying "numerous deficiencies" in the use of PUGs during the strikes. In the aftermath, the RMT called for Abellio to be stripped of the East Anglia rail franchise.

Further strike action was held for 48 hours on 8–9 November. Despite the controversy over the use of PUGs in the October, the ORR approved Greater Anglia's proposed strike day timetable, which again used PUGs to maintain a similar level of service to the usual timetable. Another 24-hour strike was held on 27 December, followed by three further 24-hour strikes on 8, 10 and 12 January 2018. A full service was again operated during these strikes, using PUGs. The dispute between the RMT and Greater Anglia was resolved on 19 July 2018, where it was agreed that drivers would operate the door providing a second member of staff was on board.

=== Merseyrail ===
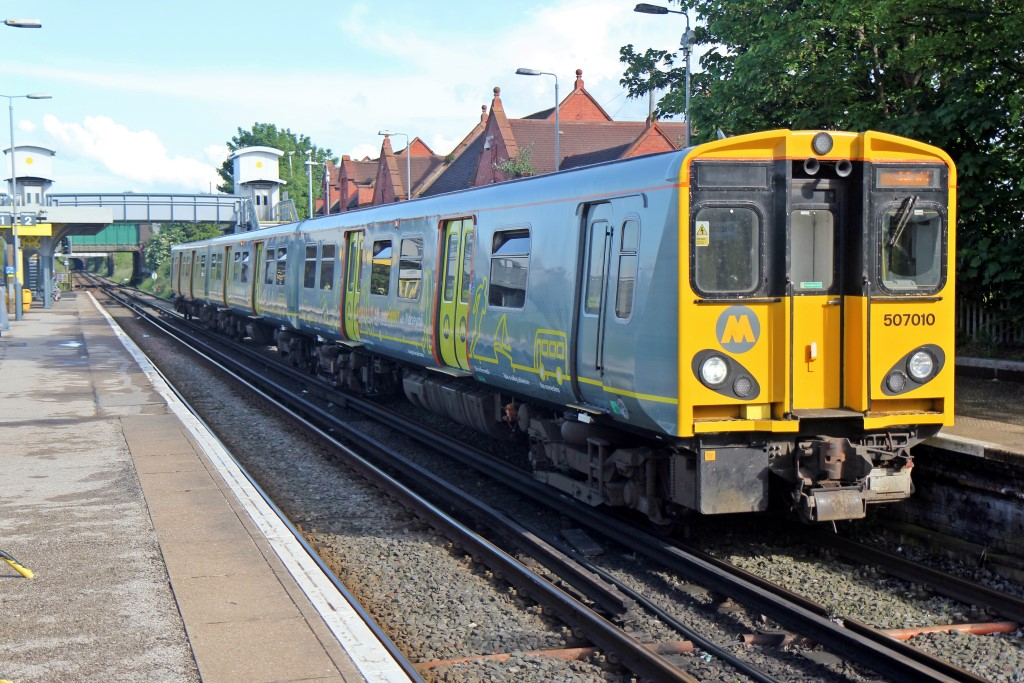
In the Merseyrail dispute, guards on Merseyrail had taken part in fifteen days of strikes as of March 2018.

In January 2016, the RMT published the results of a survey in which it claimed that 78% of regular Merseyrail passengers opposed proposals for the operator to introduce driver-only operation and remove guards from its services. The RMT launched a public campaign lobbying for Merseyrail to keep the guard on the train.

Relations between the RMT and Merseyrail broke down in May 2016 following a lack of progress in negotiations and concerns over planned staff rostering by Merseyrail on the day of the Rock 'n' Roll Liverpool Marathon & 1/2 Marathon, scheduled for 29 May. As a result, the RMT announced that members would be balloted over potential strike action. The ballot was eventually cancelled without any industrial action following an improvement in negotiations.

On 16 December 2016, Merseytravel announced that it would be taking delivery of 52 new four-car Stadler METRO electric multiple units, designated as the Class 777, from 2020 onwards to replace the existing Merseyrail fleet. The trains were ordered in a driver-only configuration, with Merseyrail announcing that guards would be removed from its services following the introduction of the Class 777 trains. As a result, in early January, the RMT issued a statement requesting clarification from Merseyrail on the issue of driver-only operation on its services, setting a deadline of 26 January to resolve the dispute. When the deadline passed without progress in talks, the RMT moved officially into dispute with Merseyrail on 2 February, launching a ballot of its members.

On 28 February, the RMT issued a statement confirming that 81.8% of union members at Merseyrail had voted in favour of industrial action, setting the first strike for 24 hours on 13 March; in addition, members were instructed to take part in an indefinite overtime ban, commencing from 7 March. Merseyrail launched legal action at the High Court to prevent the strikes going ahead. However, its case for an injunction against industrial action was unsuccessful. On the day of the strike, services were suspended entirely on the Ellesmere Port, Hunts Cross and Kirkby lines, while 23 stations on other lines were closed due to lack of staff. Most services began to wind down from around 17:30.

On 17 March, four days after the first strike and with the overtime ban still in effect, the RMT confirmed that it would meet Merseyrail representatives for "exploratory talks" to resolve the conflict. On 20 March the negotiations collapsed after three days of talks. The next day, the RMT announced details of further strike action, scheduled for 24 hours on 8 April, the date of the Grand National at Aintree Racecourse. Merseytravel criticised the choice of date for the industrial action, stating that it would "do immeasurable damage" to Liverpool's reputation; the RMT responded by stating that it "wanted to make the loudest voice possible". Services were largely reduced across the Merseyrail network during the strike, although trains continued to operate every seven to eight minutes between central Liverpool and Aintree at key times to serve the Grand National. Although ASLEF was not officially a part of the industrial action, reports suggested that Merseyrail staff affiliated with ASLEF also refused to cross picket lines set up by the RMT, adding to the disruption.

Negotiations between the RMT and Merseyrail collapsed again on 24 April. A third 24-hour strike was announced, due to place on 30 May. Following the Manchester Arena bombing on 22 May, the RMT announced that it would be suspending all industrial action nationwide indefinitely, scrapping plans for the 30 May strike on Merseyrail. In June 2017, a lack of progress in negotiations led to the RMT calling three new 24-hour strikes, scheduled for 8, 10 and 23 July. During the strikes, 33 Merseyrail stations were closed and a reduced level of service was in operation. The strike on 23 July caused disruption to passengers travelling to the final day of the 2017 Open Championship at the Royal Birkdale Golf Club.

The day after the most recent strike action, on 24 July, representatives from the RMT met with Steve Rotheram, the mayor of the Liverpool City Region. Further talks between Rotheram, the RMT and Merseyrail failed to avert further strike action being announced by mid-August, which took place for 24 hours on 1 September and for 48 hours on 3–4 September. Further 24-hour strikes took place on 3 and 5 October another happened on 8 November. adding to disruption from the planned three-week closure of Liverpool Lime Street station for refurbishment over that period. Another 24-hour strike took place on 22 December, followed by three more on 8, 10 and 12 January 2018.

On 15 February 2018, the RMT announced that a further 24-hour strike would take place, scheduled for 3 March. It was the sixteenth day of strike action on Merseyrail since the dispute began.

On 31 August 2018, it was announced that Merseyrail had abandoned driver-only trains, thus bringing an end to the dispute.

=== ScotRail ===
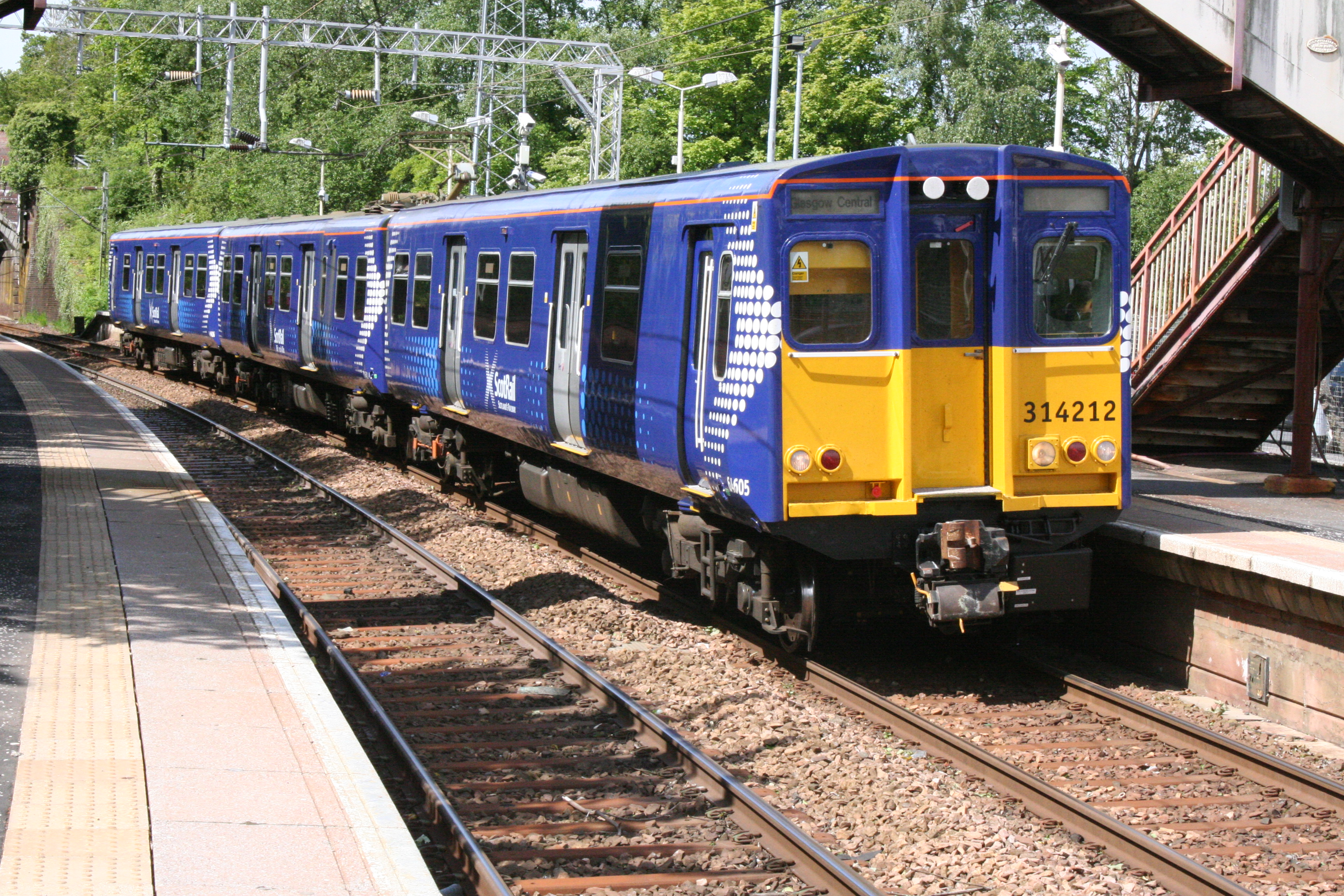
RMT-affiliated ScotRail train drivers staged six 24-hour and three 48-hour strikes in June and July 2016.

On 15 April 2016, the RMT threatened to launch a ballot of its members over possible industrial action on the Abellio ScotRail network as a result of ScotRail's proposals to introduce driver-only operation. Following a breakdown in negotiations, a ballot was launched, with union members voting 75% in favour of industrial action, from a 75% turnout, on 7 June. 24-hour strikes were called for 21 June, 23 June, 3 July, 14 July, 24 July and 31 July, as well as 48-hour strikes for 25–26 June, 10–11 July and 16–17 July; overtime bans were also announced for the whole of June and July 2016. On 20 June, the day before the first planned strike, RMT members held a protest outside the head office of Abellio ScotRail.

In late July, further strike action was announced for 24-hour periods on 7 August and 11 August, and for 48 hours on 13–14 August. On 1 August, Abellio ScotRail threatened the RMT with legal action over further strikes. On 3 August, it was announced that the RMT's planned industrial action on ScotRail during August had been suspended, as negotiations with Abellio continued.

On 20 September, the RMT announced that it had reached a deal with Abellio ScotRail protecting the role of guards on its trains. The RMT called the deal "a major breakthrough in the battle against Driver Only Operation" which would be used as a "benchmark" for further negotiations with other operators. The deal was accepted by RMT members after a referendum on 5 October, formally closing the dispute.

From November 2016, the RMT called for Abellio to be stripped of the ScotRail franchise, with it being returned to public ownership, due to a slump in performance and an alleged increase in "profiteering". On 14 September 2017, the RMT voted in favour of further industrial action on the ScotRail network over plans to cut CCTV operator jobs at two locations, although no date was set for industrial action.

=== First Great Western / Great Western Railway ===
The introduction of the Class 800 on the Great Western Main Line saw a series of strikes on First Great Western about plans to introduce DOO and other changes to working practices, including changes to the customer experience such as the removal of buffet cars. Despite multiple strikes, the company removed them. But some of the other issues were resolved. In 2016 another series of strikes took place over its outsourced cleaners contract.

=== Virgin Trains East Coast ===
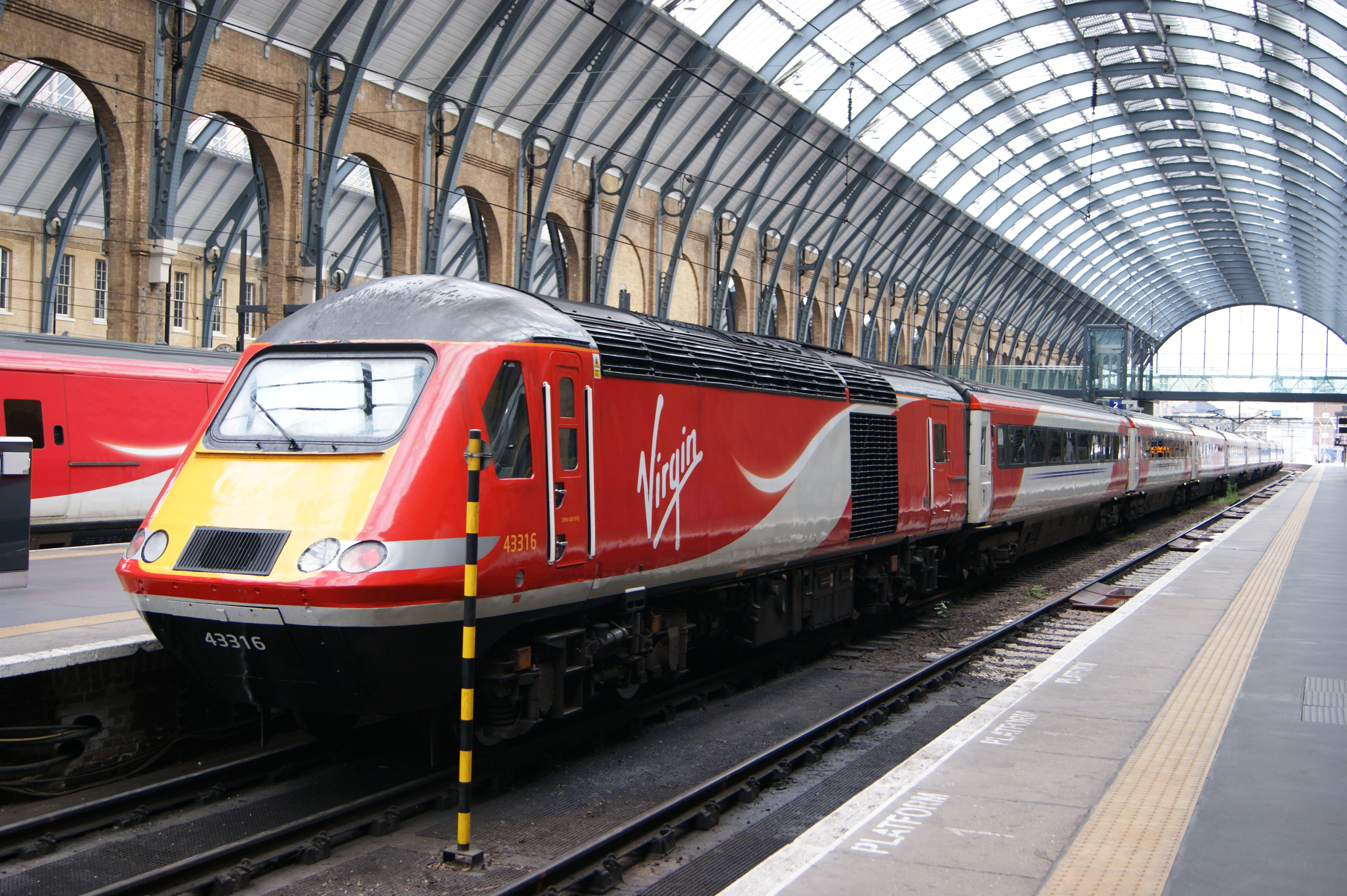
A number of strikes were planned by the RMT at Virgin Trains East Coast, but only one went ahead, in October 2016.

The RMT opened its first ballot of Virgin Trains East Coast (VTEC) staff in July 2016, regarding concerns over the planned introduction of driver-only operation, the possibility of around 200 compulsory redundancies within the operation and concerns over staff pay. On 9 August, the RMT issued a statement confirming that the ballot had passed 84% in favour of full strike action.

Three 24-hour strikes, involving all VTEC staff members except depot maintenance workers, were announced for August 2016, starting at 03:00 BST on 19, 26 and 29 August. Additionally, a 48-hour overtime ban was to be enforced from 03:00 on 27 August. On 16 August, it was announced that all industrial action at VTEC had been suspended indefinitely by the RMT to allow for further negotiations, with all three strikes and the overtime ban being cancelled as a result.

Following a breakdown in negotiations in September, further industrial action was announced, with the first 24-hour strike scheduled for 3 October. The RMT said that the strike was "well-supported" and "solid", although VTEC ran a near-normal level of service throughout the strike, following what the RMT described as "the biggest scabbing operation in recent rail history"; the RMT later claimed that this "cavalier management" resulted in an incident in which the 08:30 VTEC service from Edinburgh Waverley to London King's Cross was allowed to operate with the doors of a defective carriage locked out of use, but still carrying passengers, against railway guidelines. The service was eventually terminated short at Newcastle after the RMT and Office of Rail and Road alerted VTEC to the incident.

Further industrial action was announced in early 2017 as negotiations once again stalled. A 48-hour strike was scheduled for 28–29 April. In a statement on 24 April, the RMT announced that all industrial action on VTEC had once again been indefinitely suspended following "progress" in talks between the union and VTEC, resulting in the planned April strike being cancelled. As of February 2018, there has been no further industrial action at VTEC.

In June 2017, the RMT called for the InterCity East Coast franchise to be returned to public ownership, as it claimed the franchise was on the brink of "financial collapse" following the announcement by Stagecoach that the franchise had made a loss of £84 million since its takeover in March 2015. In February 2018, the government confirmed that Stagecoach/Virgin would be stripped of the franchise "within a small number of months" due to its failure to meet financial obligations, marking the third collapse of the franchise in eleven years.

=== Other operators ===
Cleaners' strikes at GWR and Southeastern

Industrial action has been threatened by the RMT amongst staff of various other operators. In December 2016, cleaners working for employment agency Servest UK, outsourced by Great Western Railway, voted 98% in favour of strike action over concerns about inequality in pay and working conditions compared to cleaners employed directly by GWR. These concerns were raised following a difficult period transferring the outsourcing contract from Mitie to Servest UK earlier in 2016, resulting in the creation of what the RMT called a "two-tier workforce". Two 24-hour cleaners' strikes took place from 06:00 on 16 December and 23 December. A further 48-hour strike was held between 06:00 on 19 January and 06:00 on 21 January 2017, before further industrial action was suspended by the RMT as negotiations improved. In July 2017, a new pay deal was accepted at a ballot of RMT members, formally ending the dispute.

A similar situation arose at Southeastern, whose cleaners' jobs are outsourced to Wettons. In September 2017, the RMT announced that Southeastern cleaners employed by Wettons would be balloted for potential industrial action over pay and working conditions. The ballot passed in favour of industrial action. The first strike by Wettons cleaners at Southeastern took place for 24 hours from 20:30 on 19 October.

East Midlands Trains

In September 2017, the RMT warned that staff at East Midlands Trains would be balloted for potential strike action due to negotiations breaking down in an ongoing pay dispute; the dispute was later resolved without industrial action. East Midlands Trains at present has no plans to introduce driver-only operation.

London Midland

In January 2017, the RMT announced that it would ballot guards at London Midland for potential industrial action over concerns regarding the introduction of externally-contracted security staff on its trains at the end of December 2016, which the RMT alleged would replace the role of "safety-critical" guards on some services, paving the way for DOO operation. London Midland denied having plans in place to implement DOO operation on its network. Following negotiations with the RMT, London Midland ceased using externally contracted security staff on its trains on 30 January; as a result, the RMT suspended its ballot on 2 February, averting potential industrial action, before formally declaring the dispute closed.

== See also ==
- 1919 United Kingdom railway strike
- 2022–2024 United Kingdom railway strikes
- London Underground strikes
