= Bob Crow =

British trade union leader

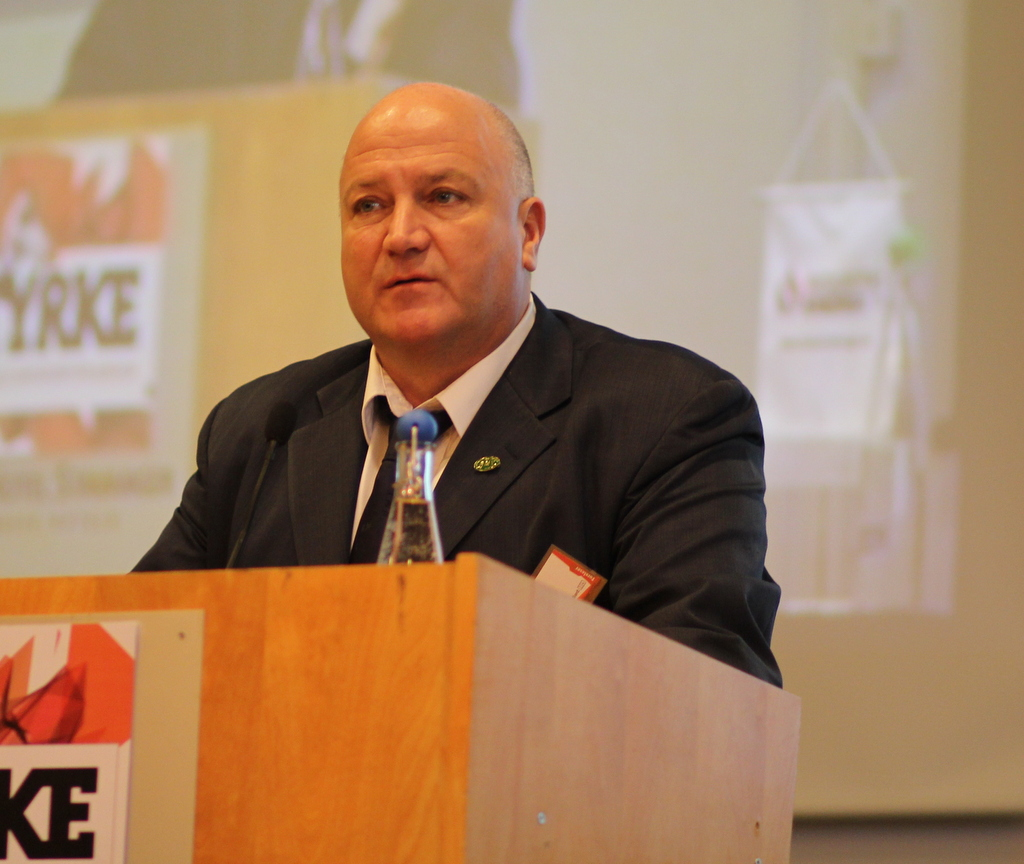
- Crow at Industri Energi's Styrke conference in 2012
- Born: Robert Crow; 13 June 1961; Epping, Essex, England
- Died: 11 March 2014 (aged 52); Whipps Cross, London, England
- Occupation: Trade union leader
- Political party: Communist Party of Britain
- Other political affiliations: Communist Party of Great Britain
- Spouse: Geraldine Horan (divorced)
- Children: 2

Robert Crow (13 June 1961 – 11 March 2014) was an English trade union leader who served as the General Secretary of the National Union of Rail, Maritime and Transport Workers (RMT) from 2002 until his death in 2014. He was also a member of the General Council of the Trades Union Congress (TUC). A self-described "communist/socialist", he was a leading figure in the No to EU – Yes to Democracy campaign.

Crow joined London Transport in 1977 and soon became involved in trade unionism. He was regarded as part of the Awkward Squad, a loose grouping of left-wing union leaders who came to power in a series of electoral victories beginning in 2002. After he became leader, the RMT's membership increased from around 57,000 in 2002 to more than 80,000 in 2008, making it one of Britain's fastest-growing trade unions.

Crow was a polarising figure in British politics. Supporters praised him as a champion of the working class and a successful trade unionist; Boris Johnson argued that he held London to ransom with strikes.

== Early life ==
Born at 162 Burrow Road, Epping, Essex to Lillian (née Hutton) and George Crow; his background was working-class, a fact of which he remained proud throughout his life. Crow's father was a docker who taught him to read both the Morning Star and the Financial Times, but to disbelieve everything in the latter. His father also was a lifelong member of the Transport and General Workers Union. His family subsequently moved to Hainault. He left school at 16 and joined London Transport, where he became involved in union politics. His first job was making the tea, then he worked as part of a tree-felling group in 1977, before moving onto heavy track repairing. In 1983, he was elected as a local representative to the National Union of Railwaymen (NUR) and in 1985 became NUR national officer for track workers.

During his formative years, prominent figures such as Jack Jones, Hugh Scanlon, Joe Gormley, and Len Murray dominated the British trade union movement. As a result, he commented that "Starting my career with these people in charge of unions, and working in a nationalised industry with people who had put in 30 or even 40 years of service helped shape my views." He was a great lover of soul music in his teens often to be found dancing to jazz-funk and reggae in working mans clubs and pubs across London and Essex.

== Trade union career and politics ==
You've got to recognise that the job you do ain't about being nice. The job we do is about defending our members. And as far as I'm concerned, if I can get job security and decent pay for my members I couldn't give two hoots about being unpopular.

— Crow

In 1990 the National Union of Railwaymen merged with the National Union of Seamen to form the National Union of Rail, Maritime and Transport Workers (RMT). The following year Crow became the London Underground representative on the National Executive. In 1991, he became assistant general secretary, and on 14 February 2002, he membership elected Crow to succeed Jimmy Knapp as general secretary. He received 12,051 votes in the election – nearly twice as many as the other two candidates (Phil Bialyk received 4,512 votes and Ray Spry-Shute received 1,997). Six weeks earlier on 1 January 2002, Crow was attacked outside his home by two men wielding an iron bar. He speculated that he was the victim of hired employer muscle, although it is possible, according to The Guardian, that the culprits were members of far right activist groups who were active in Dagenham at the time. Crow was a member of the General Council of the Trades Union Congress. From 2006 until his death, he was a member of the Executive Board of the International Transport Workers Federation, the global trade union for transport workers.

Under Bob Crow's leadership, the RMT affiliated to the World Federation of Trade Unions and he was regularly invited to attend, in his capacity as general secretary of the RMT, the presidential council of the WFTU.

At the time he became general secretary, he had a strong negotiating position as the industry was booming, and was the leader of one of the only British trade unions which still wielded industrial strength.

=== Communist Party and Socialist Labour Party ===
Crow identified as a "communist/socialist", and between 1983 and 1997, was a member of the Communist Party of Great Britain and then the Communist Party of Britain.

He described his political philosophy with a quote from Argentine Marxist–Leninist revolutionary Che Guevara: "Hasta la victoria siempre!" ("Forever onwards until the victory!"). He kept a bust of communist leader Vladimir Lenin in his office. He described the aims of a trade-unionist as to secure "Job security, being safe, best possible pay, best possible conditions, decent pensions, and a world that lives in peace."

In 1997 he briefly joined Arthur Scargill's Socialist Labour Party (SLP), and was always a strong supporter of Scargill for his commitment to trade unionism. Crow rejected the argument that Scargill was responsible for the defeats of the miners and the union movement more generally.

Crow was a founding member of the Trade Unionist and Socialist Coalition for several years until his death. Previously, he supported the now disbanded Socialist Alliance, and believed all socialist parties should unite. In the 2005 general election, he endorsed Robert Griffiths, the Communist Party of Britain candidate in Pontypridd, calling him "a champion of workers' rights". Griffiths went on to win 233 votes (0.6%), coming last out of the six candidates. In the 2010 Local Election, he publicly supported the directly elected Mayoral candidate in the London Borough of Hackney Monty Goldman and the candidate for Leabridge Ward Mick Carty.

=== Campaign for a New Workers' Party ===
Crow was an outspoken critic of Tony Blair, who "squandered a massive landslide from an electorate hungry for change, poured billions of public pounds into private pockets and accelerated the growing gap between rich and poor". He deemed the policies implemented by Blair's New Labour project to be "near enough identical" to those of the Conservatives.

Speaking at the founding conference of the National Shop Stewards Network in July 2007, Crow called for a new party for the working class.

In 2013, Crow accused the then Labour leader Ed Miliband of showing contempt for unions. He again called on trade unions to break ties with Labour and create a new party to challenge the "anti-worker" agenda of the mainstream political parties.

=== RMT industrial action ===
After Transport for London offered workers an inflation-adjusted pay rise, Crow described TfL's approach to pay as "confrontational".

I don't shirk from taking industrial action. Our job is to negotiate the best pay and conditions. Industrial action is the last resort and you don't take it lightly – but when you start you don't finish until you have won. That's what I have been brought up on.

— Crow, on industrial action

In response to the RMT declaring a 48-hour strike on 10 June 2009, Crow wrote in The Guardian Comment is free section the purpose of the move: "On London Underground, bosses are threatening to tear up an agreement aimed at safeguarding jobs, and have refused to rule out compulsory redundancies. Up to 4,000 jobs are at risk as part of a multibillion-pound cuts package that can be traced directly back to the collapse of Metronet and the failure of the PPP."

"RMT have made it clear we expect managers to abide by the existing job security agreements and we would simply not be doing our job as a union if we allowed the tube to treat our members as cannon fodder who can be hired and fired at will", adding that "It wasn't our members who created the downturn and we will not be bullied into accepting that they should be forced to pay for an economic crisis that was cooked up by the bankers and the politicians."

Rail managers recognised Crow as a moderate within the RMT; he faced calls from figures to the left of him who were more eager to use industrial action. He was also criticised by RMT members on the right of his position; Crow repeatedly championed the cause of the lowest-paid workers, such as cleaners, whose jobs were often outsourced to separate companies. Sectors of the more highly-paid RMT membership were critical of Crow for this support, believing it inefficient.

=== No to EU – Yes to Democracy ===
In March 2009, Crow announced that the RMT would be fronting the No to EU – Yes to Democracy platform with an array of socialist organisations and individuals for the 2009 European Parliament elections. No2EU – Yes to Democracy stood for a Europe of "independent, democratic states that value its public services and does not offer them to profiteers; a Europe that guarantees the rights of workers and does not put the interests of big business above that of ordinary people".

As the party leader and lead candidate in London, Crow was "not against workers coming into the country", unlike other Eurosceptic groupings, but he was against "two workers from different countries competing against each other on different rates of pay" and added that "Our main role will be out there among working people, giving them our support and helping to save their industries from privatisation".

No2EU secured 153,236 votes, compared to an RMT membership of 80,000. The party achieved 1% of the popular vote in Britain, giving them the 12th largest share of the vote, behind Scargill's Socialist Labour Party and the far-right British National Party. This was insufficient for a seat in the European Parliament. In London, where Crow was a candidate, the party secured 17,758 votes, equating to the tenth largest vote share. No2EU secured a larger share of the popular vote in this region than the Socialist Labour Party.

=== Accusation of cronyism ===
When it became known that Crow's wife had been appointed chief executive of the RMT credit union, the Milton Keynes RMT branch secretary stated he was filling posts with "henchmen". Crow responded that his wife was the only applicant for the position, and he had interviewed her for the role.

=== Salary ===
The BBC reported Crow's annual salary as £145,000. It was pointed out by a journalist for The Independent that the correct figure was around £96,000, and this was also mentioned by Crow in interview. According to the Trades Union Certification Officer, in 2012 Crow's basic salary at the RMT was £89,805. The union also paid £10,313 of National Insurance contributions and £34,429 into his pension in 2012. No car or chauffeur was provided. Discussing his salary in a BBC interview, Crow stated "I'm worth it". The Telegraph agreed that it was deserved for Crow who "represented the interests of his members with a single-minded determination". The newspaper concluded Crow "wanted the best deal for the people who paid his salary – and they continued to reward him because he delivered it."

=== Final years: 2013–14 ===
After the death of former Prime Minister Margaret Thatcher in April 2013, Crow stated: "As far as I'm concerned she can rot in Hell." In January 2014, Crow went on a cruise from Barbados to Brazil and was photographed by paparazzi on Copacabana Beach. Crow commented: "What do you want me to do? Sit under a tree and read Karl Marx all day?".

When a Daily Mirror reporter asked him in February 2014 if he felt sorry for commuters, he responded: "Course I feel sorry for them. But they know our fight isn't with them. It's with Transport for London. And what do they expect a trade union to do? If you join one you expect it to fight for your rights and your job – and that's what I'm doing."

== Personal life ==
Crow advocated the UK to withdraw from the European Union. Since childhood, he had supported Millwall Football Club, and as RMT leader he kept a photograph of the club on the wall of his office. He was known to be a fan of boxing, and in an interview from 2011, claimed to work out six days a week, and be able to bench-press 120 kilograms (260 lb). He also had a pet Staffordshire Bull Terrier whom he named Castro after the Cuban Marxist–Leninist leader Fidel Castro.

The Guardian described Crow as having "a very keen brain and strong emotional intelligence", while The New York Times deemed him to be both "confrontational and charismatic" and "sharp and shrewd". Crow took a keen interest in the weather and owned a barometer, informing the press that if he had not become a trade unionist then he would have liked to have become a weatherman.

Despite the many portrayals as a radical socialist Crow was rather seen to be very pragmatic in outlook, and was described as "too shrewd for doctrine". Although believing that it was morally right to punish murder by capital punishment, he did not support the death penalty in practice, claiming too little faith in the criminal justice system. Similarly, he said that he would happily support the Conservative Party if by doing so he could achieve the renationalisation of the railways.

Crow's marriage to Geraldine Horan, on 12 June 1982, by whom he had a daughter, Kerrie-Anne, and two grandsons, Daniel and Jamie Atlee, ended in divorce. He later entered a long-term relationship with Nicola Hoarau, with whom he had another daughter, Tanya. Writing in the New Statesman, George Eaton thought Crow to have been "more hurt than most realise by the press intrusion into his private life".

Crow had a distinctive south-east accent described variously as Cockney or soft-spoken Essex. He was often to be seen in the stands of Millwall FC in his trademark flat cap.

He lived in a three-bedroom council house in Woodford Green, eastern Greater London. When asked why he lived in a council house despite his high income, Crow said "I was born in a council house, as far as I'm concerned I will die in one."

Crow played up to the caricature of himself created by the press, by, for example, describing bankers as greedy "spivs". Crow was once asked by a journalist from the Financial Times how he would feel if his children had chosen careers in banking. He responded that he was happy for them to live their lives. He revealed that his brother was a stockbroker but that he was more concerned about the fact his brother supported Arsenal F.C.

In 2011, lawyers acting for Crow wrote to the Metropolitan Police asking for any evidence or information that they may have uncovered in respect of the News International phone hacking scandal. Crow had suspicions that "journalists may have had access to private information about my movements and my union's activities that date back to the year 2000".

== Death ==
Crow died in the early hours of 11 March 2014 at Whipps Cross University Hospital after suffering an aneurysm and heart attack.

== Legacy ==
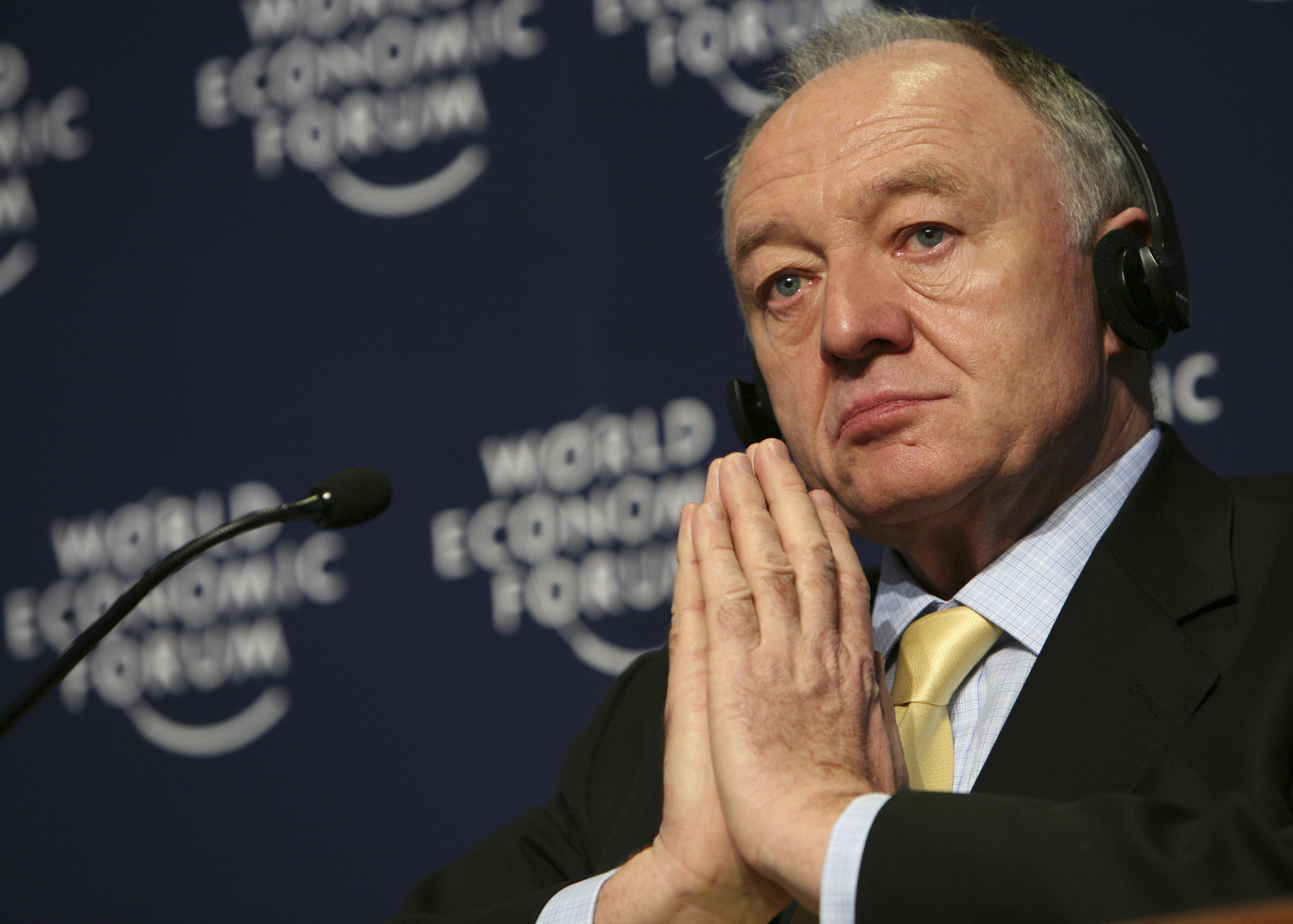
After Crow's death, the former mayor of London Ken Livingstone stated that "The only working-class people who still have well-paid jobs in London are [RMT] members"

Crow had a polarising effect in British politics, becoming "the left's favourite firebrand and the right's favourite villain". To supporters, he was a working-class hero who successfully stood up for the rights of RMT members. Deemed highly successful in his job, during his leadership of the RMT, membership rose from 59,000 to 78,000, while London tube drivers' pay rose to £52,000, nearly twice the national average wage. Discussing Crow's contribution, former mayor of London Ken Livingstone said that "The only working-class people who still have well-paid jobs in London are [RMT] members". The Guardian asserted that he "managed to popularise the cause of trade unions at a time of declining membership and increasing hostility". BBC News commented that he had managed to become "one of the UK's best-known characters at a time when the rest of the nation's trade union movement had faded into comparative obscurity".

However, Crow was regularly criticised by both the right and the centre-left. Critics saw him as a bully who improved the status of RMT workers at the expense of commuters. The Daily Express deemed him a "champagne socialist" for his lavish lifestyle.

Following Crow's death, tributes were offered by figures from the trade union movement. TUC Secretary-General Frances O'Grady called him "an outstanding trade unionist, who tirelessly fought for his members, his industry and the wider trade union movement". Manuel Cortes, leader of the TSSA rail union, stated that Crow "was admired by his members and feared by employers, which is exactly how he liked it... It was a privilege to campaign and fight alongside him because he never gave an inch." Tributes were also offered by politicians on the political left. Livingstone asserted that the RMT leader was "broadly right on most key issues" and that "He fought really hard for his members." Leader of the Labour Party Ed Miliband commented that "I didn't always agree with him politically but I always respected his tireless commitment to fighting for the men and women in his union. He did what he was elected to do, was not afraid of controversy and was always out supporting his members across the country."

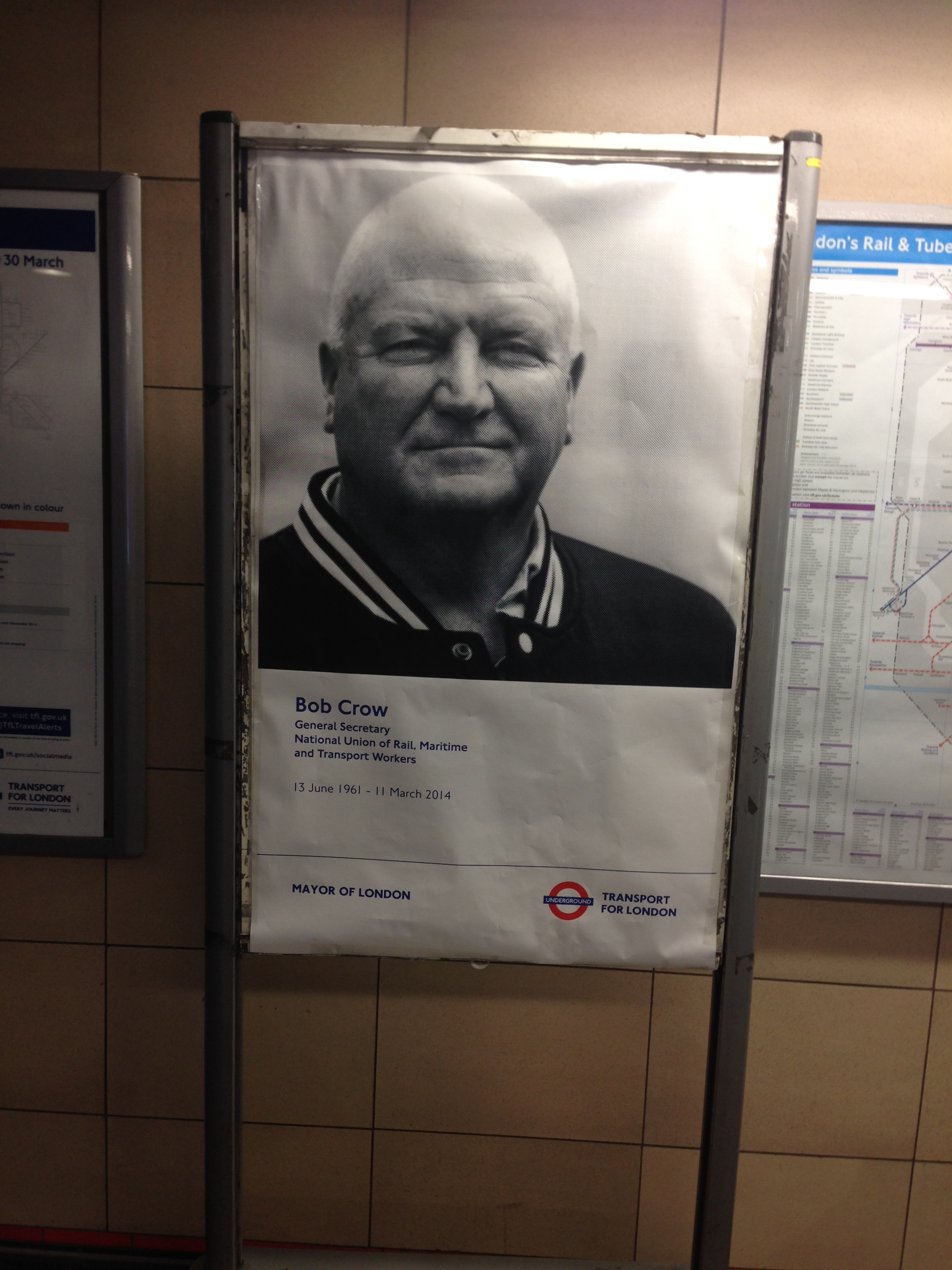
A poster marking Crow's death placed at Bethnal Green tube station.

His death also drew responses from the political right. Conservative Mayor of London Boris Johnson stated: "I'm shocked. Bob Crow was a fighter and a man of character... Whatever our political differences, and there were many, this is tragic news... Bob fought tirelessly for his beliefs and for his members. There can be absolutely no doubt that he played a big part in the success of the Tube, and he shared my goal to make transport in London an even greater success." A spokesman speaking for Conservative Prime Minister David Cameron commented that "The Prime Minister expresses his sincere condolences to Mr Crow's family and friends." Nigel Farage, the leader of the UK Independence Party, tweeted to express his sadness at Crow's death, commenting that "I liked him" and that he had found common ground over their mutual anti-EU sentiment. On his death, management at Transport for London placed posters marking his death at tube stations throughout London as a mark of respect.

=== Bob Crow Brigade ===
The Bob Crow Brigade is a group of volunteers from the UK and the Republic of Ireland fighting as part of the International Freedom Battalion (IFB). The IFB consists of leftist foreign volunteers fighting alongside the People's Protection Units in the Syrian Civil War in support of the Rojava Revolution and against the Islamic State of Iraq and the Levant. The group has expressed solidarity with the RMT and striking rail workers in the UK. Steve Hedley, senior assistant general secretary of the RMT, said: "Bob would have been honoured that young people from Britain would fight the forces of evil in his name. A great admirer of the international brigades that fought in Spain, Crow would of course have drawn the parallels with the new international brigades fighting clerical fascism and defending Yazhidi, Muslim and Christian workers from slavery and persecution."

Trade union offices
Preceded by Jimmy Knapp	General Secretary of the RMT; 2002–2014	Succeeded by Mick Cash
Preceded by Jeremy Dear	Chair of the Trades Union Councils' Joint Consultative Committee; 2011–2014	Succeeded by Matt Wrack
