= Eddie Dempsey =

English trade unionist (born 1982)

General Secretary of the National Union of Rail, Maritime and Transport Workers
- Incumbent
- Assumed office 7 March 2025
- Preceded by: Mick Lynch

Senior Assistant General Secretary of the RMT
- In office April 2022 – March 2025
- Preceded by: Steve Hedley
- Succeeded by: John Leach

Assistant General Secretary of the RMT
- In office October 2021 – April 2022
- Succeeded by: John Leach

Personal details
- Born: 1982 (age 43–44) New Cross, London, England
- Other political affiliations: Connolly Association
- Occupation: Trade unionist

Edward Hugh Dempsey (born April 1982) is the general secretary of the National Union of Rail, Maritime and Transport Workers (RMT), a trade union in the UK. He was previously elected as the assistant general secretary of the union in October 2021 to serve a five-year term until October 2026. After Mick Lynch stood down as general secretary of the RMT union, Dempsey was elected to the office on 7 March 2025.

Dempsey supported general secretary Mick Lynch on media duties during the 2022 United Kingdom railway strikes, writing about the RMT's strike action in an article for the Morning Star, and speaking at a Manchester rally for the "Enough is Enough" campaign, supporting calls for a national day of action in October 2022, and in Liverpool.

Dempsey was born and raised in South London's New Cross area to Irish parents, an upbringing that led him to become secretary of the Connolly Association, an Irish emigrant workers organisation. He has cited James Connolly and Padraig Pearse among his inspirations.

Dempsey identifies with socialism, and in 2019 spoke at events arguing the socialist case for the UK leaving the European Union, subsequently defending himself from criticism from journalist and left-wing activist Owen Jones, after Jones and fellow journalist Ash Sarkar withdrew from a London event because of Dempsey's support for a no-deal Brexit. Dempsey has participated in several marches against fascism and racism.

In 2022, it was revealed that Dempsey had visited the Donbass region of Ukraine in 2015, where he was photographed meeting the Russian separatist paramilitary leader Aleksey Mozgovoy. Following Mozgovoy's assassination, Dempsey wrote an obituary paying tribute to him. Following the revelations, Labour MP Chris Bryant demanded an apology from Dempsey for his previous actions and statements. Under Dempsey's leadership, the RMT has demanded an end to British military aid to Ukraine, describing the UK as playing "a belligerent role in international relations by supplying British-made weapons, military support, credit and billions of pounds in public funding" in Ukraine's defence.

== Personal life ==
Dempsey supports Millwall FC and Celtic.
