= John Cogger (trade unionist) =

John Cogger (8 April 1941 – 9 May 2003) was a British trade unionist.

Born in Mill Hill, Cogger was educated at Willesden Technical College, before finding work with British Rail. He worked as a box-boy, then a train recorder, before qualifying as a rail signaller. He joined the National Union of Railwaymen (NUR), becoming active in his local branch, then secretary of the signallers' grade committee. He was elected to the union's executive in 1974, and from 1980 was chair of the national negotiating committee.

In 1990, Cogger was elected as president of the NUR. He supported its merger into the new RMT union, and became its first president. However, under the union's rules, he could not serve consecutive terms as president, so left the post in 1992. He was re-elected president in 1996, serving until 1998, and again from 2002 until his death in 2003. He was the first person to serve three terms as president of the NUR or RMT.

Trade union offices
Preceded by Alan Foster	President of the National Union of Railwaymen; 1990	Succeeded by Union merged
Preceded by Union founded	President of the RMT; 1990–1992	Succeeded by Don Loughlin
Preceded by Don Loughlin	President of the RMT; 1996–1998	Succeeded by Reg Hopkins
Preceded by Phil Boston	President of the RMT; 2002–2003	Succeeded by Tony Donaghey
