= Jimmy Knapp =

British trade unionist

- Born: 29 September 1940
- Died: 13 August 2001

James Knapp (29 September 1940 – 13 August 2001) was a British trade unionist. He was successively General Secretary of the National Union of Railwaymen (NUR) from 1983, and then of the merged National Union of Rail, Maritime and Transport Workers (RMT) from 1990 to his death in 2001. He served on the executive board of the International Transport Workers' Federation from 1983 to 2001, the General Council of the Trades Union Congress from 1983 to 2001, and was President of the Trades Union Congress in 1994.

== Early and private life ==
Knapp was born into a railway family in Hurlford, Ayrshire one of two boys. He was educated at Hurlford primary school and Kilmarnock Academy. He learned his politics at a Socialist Sunday school.

He was distinguished by his broad Scottish accent and his height, standing 6'4" tall. He married Sylvia Florence Yeomans in 1965 and together they had a daughter. He married his second wife Eva Leigh, shortly before he died. He loved football and supported Kilmarnock FC and Crystal Palace FC.

He lived in West Wickham, and died of cancer in Bromley, Greater London, aged 60. He was survived by his second wife Eva, his first wife Sylvia and their daughter. He was the last person in Britain to have a full railway funeral in honour of the work he had done, and was carried from London to Glasgow by train with a piper to pipe him on and off the train at either end for burial in Hurlford in August 2001.

== Union career ==
He left school aged 15 in 1955 to work in the signal box in Gatehead walking 4.5 miles each way in all weather to get there. By the age of 18 he had become branch collector for the National Union of Railwaymen (NUR) and by 21 he was the NUR branch secretary. He rose through the union ranks, becoming a full-time union official at the age of 31. He moved to London in 1972 to work as a divisional officer and worked in the NUR headquarters from 1981.

When Sid Weighell resigned in 1983, Knapp was the successful left-wing candidate to replace him as General Secretary of the NUR. Knapp had been a relatively junior union officer, having failed an exam to become assistant general secretary. A "candidate from nowhere", he beat the sitting assistant general secretary Charlie Turnock by a wide margin, despite Weighell describing him as "a stooge of the Communist and Trotskyite Left" and "wet behind the ears".

As General Secretary of the NUR, he joined the General Council of the Trades Union Congress and the executive board of the International Transport Workers' Federation in 1983. He improved the NUR's relations with other rail unions, including ASLEF, and fought against closure proposed in the Serpell report on railway finances. He offered strong public support to Arthur Scargill and the National Union of Mineworkers in the 1984 Miners' Strike, with NUR members refusing to work on coal trains, but also sought to make the union comply with new trades union legislation, particularly the Trade Union Act 1984 introduced to require secret ballots as a result of the Miner's Strike. Ironically, he was unable to persuade the membership to vote in favour of a strike in 1985, when driver-only operation trains (without a guard) were introduced more widely, but he then led a series of one-day strikes in 1989 which resulted in an improved pay offer.

The NUR merged with the National Union of Seamen (NUS) in 1990 to become the National Union of Rail, Maritime and Transport Workers, and Knapp continued as General Secretary of the merged union. He opposed rail privatisation in the early 1990s but the Conservative government forced the policy through. In 1994 he led a strike of signalmen which resulted in substantial pay increases. In the 1990s, he supported Neil Kinnock and John Smith in their efforts to reform the Labour party, including the "one member, one vote" proposal that ended the trades union block vote. He defeated a challenge for the union leadership in 1999 from Greg Tucker, winning a fourth five-year term as General Secretary.

He also served as a director of the Trade Union Unit Trust from 1984, and on the board of the Unity Trust Bank from 1984, becoming its president in 1989. He was President of the Trades Union Congress in 1994.

His union career tracked a decline in union membership. In 1955, the NUR had over 350,000 members. When he became General Secretary in 1983, it was just over 140,000. By 1990, the combined RMT had a membership of 60,000.

After Knapp's death in August 2001, Bob Crow was elected as the new General Secretary of the RMT in February 2002.

Trade union offices
Preceded by Sidney Weighell	General Secretary of the National Union of Railwaymen; 1983–1990	Succeeded by Position abolished
Preceded by New position	General Secretary of the RMT; 1990–2001	Succeeded by Bob Crow
Preceded by Alan Tuffin	President of the Trades Union Congress; 1994	Succeeded by Leif Mills
Preceded by Rita Donaghy	Chair of the Trades Councils' Joint Consultative Committee; 1999–2001	Succeeded by Tony Burke
