= Mick Lynch (trade unionist) =

British trade unionist (born 1962)

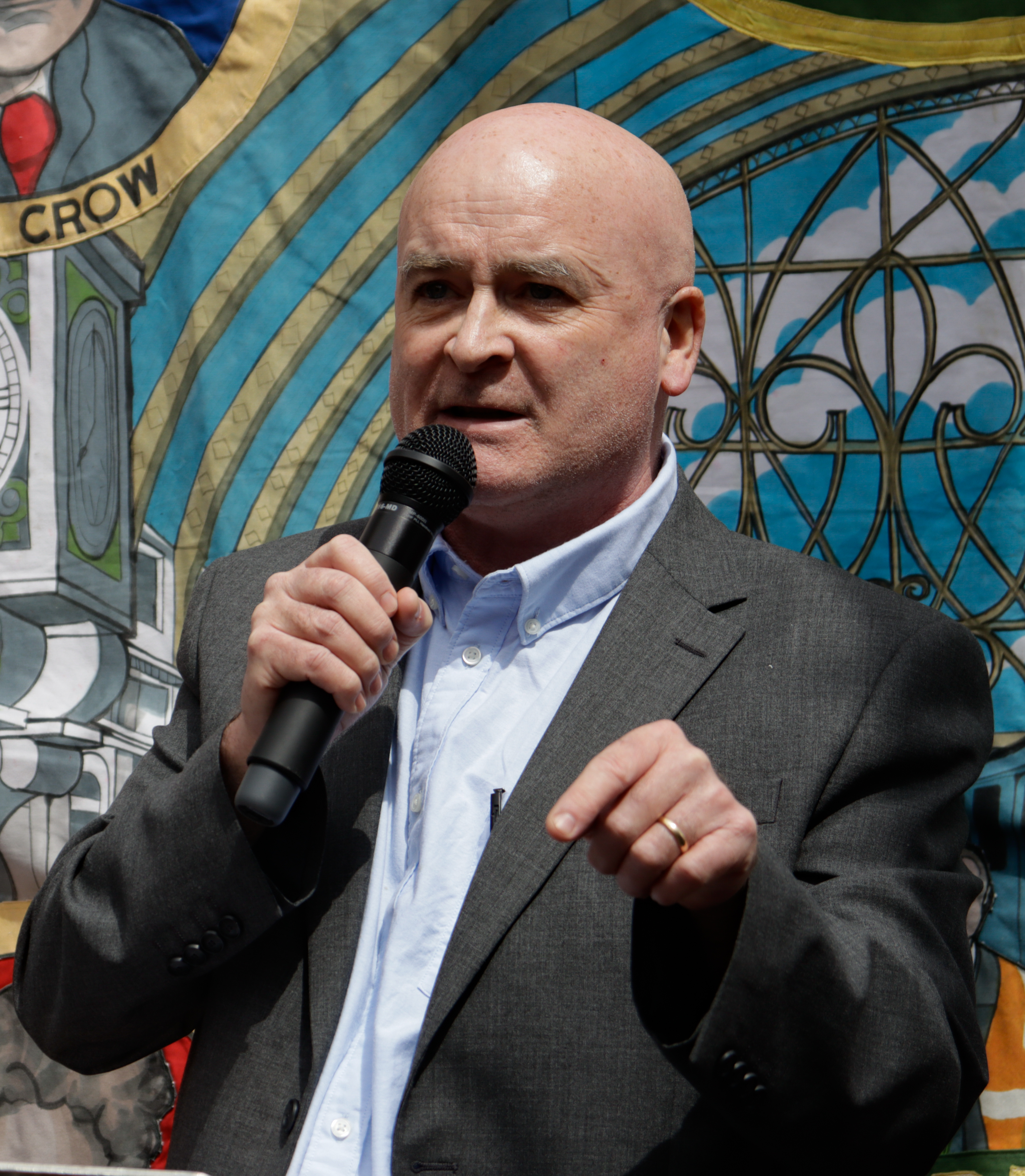
- Lynch in June 2022

General Secretary of the RMT
- In office May 2021 – 6 March 2025
- Preceded by: Mick Cash
- Succeeded by: Eddie Dempsey

Personal details
- Born: Michael Lynch; January 1962 (age 64) London, England
- Children: 3
- Occupation: Trade unionist

Michael Lynch (born January 1962) is a British-Irish trade unionist who served as the General Secretary of the RMT from May 2021 until his retirement in March 2025. During the high-profile rail strikes of 2022–23, Lynch became a spokesperson and symbol for the wider trade union movement.

== Early life ==
Lynch was born in West London in January 1962, the youngest of five children, growing up in a Catholic-dominated Paddington council estate. His mother was Northern Irish cleaner Ellen "Nellie" Morris and his father Irish labourer and postman Jackie Lynch. His parents immigrated during the Second World War, with his mother hailing from an area close to Crossmaglen and his father coming from Cork. He grew up in the Paddington area of London, in what he described as "rented rooms that would now be called slums". He was raised in an Irish Catholic family, but is now a lapsed Catholic.. Lynch was educated at the London Oratory School.

== Career ==
Lynch left school at the age of 16 and qualified as an electrician, then worked in construction before being blacklisted for joining a union. In 1993, unable to find any more work in construction, he began working for Eurostar and became active in the National Union of Rail, Maritime and Transport Workers (RMT). Two decades after being illegally blacklisted, he received a settlement for it.

Lynch voted to leave the European Union in the Brexit referendum in 2016 because of his belief that the EU should not function as one sovereign country. This stance was in line with that of his RMT union which encouraged its membership to vote for Brexit, providing several reasons including protection of workers rights. He stood by his support for Brexit in 2022, and later stated that he had done so in order to renationalise the railways, which he believed was not possible within the EU.

Lynch served two terms as Assistant General Secretary of the RMT and two terms on its executive. In 2020, after General Secretary Mick Cash took time off due to ill health, Lynch was appointed as the acting General Secretary but stood down after a few months, accusing members of the union's national executive of bullying and harassment. This accusation was similar to Cash's. During his time as Assistant General Secretary, Lynch criticised Boris Johnson's suggestion that allowing driverless trains should be a condition for the funding of Transport for London services, accused the government of using the London Underground as a "political football" before the 2021 mayoral elections, and threatened strike action if privatisation of the Underground began. The Stonehaven derailment also took place over these months, and Lynch offered his condolences on behalf of the RMT. He won an election for the permanent role of General Secretary and took up the position in May 2021.

As part of the media coverage of the RMT's 2022–23 strikes, Lynch gained widespread attention for his appearances in interviews and debates on the BBC, Sky News, TalkTV, and ITV. On 23 June 2022, he was a panellist on BBC One's Question Time. Piers Morgan criticised him in June for using a picture of the villain The Hood from the children's TV series Thunderbirds as his Facebook profile picture, to which Lynch replied, "Is that the level journalism's at these days?" On 23 September 2022, he was a panellist on BBC One's Have I Got News for You. Media coverage in December 2022, particularly from Metro and Prime Minister Rishi Sunak, likened him to the Grinch and accused him of wanting to "steal Christmas". Lynch retorted, "I'm not the Grinch, I'm a trade union official and I'm determined to get a deal." In December 2023 The New Statesman described Lynch as having "made industrial action cool," naming him as the UK's nineteenth most powerful left-wing figure of the year.

In May and June 2023, Lynch was featured in the BBC series Strike: Inside the Unions. In September 2023, he criticised closures of railway ticket offices and called for a consultation. He stated to the House of Commons Transport Select Committee that the closures would cause people to "not want to travel once the sun's gone down" and drew attention to the effect of the closures upon disabled and elderly people, as well as the loss of community centres in many towns and villages.

In January 2025, Lynch announced his decision to retire as the General Secretary of the RMT.

== Personal life ==
Lynch's wife, Mary, has been a nurse and trade unionist in the NHS since 1984. They have three children together.

Lynch has cited Irish republican and trade union leader James Connolly as his political hero and inspiration. He is a fan of Irish football team Cork City FC. He has expressed his admiration for Irish footballer Ray Houghton and other Irish sportspeople.
