= Mick Cash =

British trade unionist (born 1960)

Michael Joseph Cash (born 17 February 1960) is an English trade unionist, and the former general secretary of the National Union of Rail, Maritime and Transport Workers (RMT).

== Early life ==
Cash was born in Laindon Hills, Basildon, Essex, the third child of seven of Irish Travellers from County Kildare.

== Career ==
=== Early career ===
Cash became a rail worker for British Rail in 1978, looking after railway signals at Watford Junction signal box West Coast Main Line. He was eventually elected assistant general secretary of the RMT, and was subsequently elected general secretary in September 2014, following the death of Bob Crow, defeating four other candidates. Cash retired as general secretary of the RMT in June 2021.

=== Political positions ===
Cash was a member of the Labour Party's National Executive Committee (NEC) until the RMT disassociated itself from the party in 2004, and remains a Labour Party member as he has been since 1982. In that regard, he was widely considered as less radical than his predecessor, Bob Crow.

Cash served as a Labour councillor on Watford Borough Council for 8 years, serving as the Deputy Leader of Watford Labour Group.

Cash has been a vocal Brexiter urging the rail workers to vote against the European Union. He then voiced concerns over other trade unions that were considering asking for a second referendum.

=== Coronavirus pandemic ===
During the COVID-19 pandemic, Cash criticised the Government in its handling of relaxing the lockdown, with him calling on public transport workers to "refuse to work" if they feel unsafe. He also criticised the decision of the Department for Transport to force Mayor of London Sadiq Khan to place two special representatives on the board of Transport for London, stating "London transport workers have been vital to fighting COVID-19 and any attacks on their pay, jobs and conditions arising from this imposed settlement will be a complete betrayal."

== Personal life ==
Cash is a keen football supporter, and follows Watford F.C.

Trade union offices
Preceded by Vernon Hince	Senior Assistant General Secretary of the RMT; 2002–2014	Succeeded by Steve Hedley
Preceded by Bob Crow	General Secretary of the RMT; 2014–2020	Succeeded by Mick Lynch
