= National Shop Stewards Network =

- Formation: 7 July 2007; 19 years ago
- Location: United Kingdom
- Key people: Linda Taaffe, secretary; Rob Williams, national chair
- Website: www.shopstewards.net

National Shop Stewards Network (NSSN) is a network of shop stewards launched in Britain in 2007.

== Foundation ==
The NSSN was founded at a conference called by the National Union of Rail, Maritime and Transport Workers (RMT) on 7 July 2007. The proposal to re-establish a shop stewards movement came from an RMT sponsored conference to discuss working class political representation held in January 2006.

== Campaigns ==
=== Anti-cuts campaign ===
Following a unanimous decision of the steering committee, on 22 January 2011, the NSSN held a conference to discuss launching its own anti-cuts campaign. A motion from a majority on the steering committee proposed establishing an anti-cuts campaign "anti-cuts campaign, bringing trade unions and communities together to save all jobs and services", whilst a minority on the steering committee argued against the motion, opposing setting up an anti-cuts campaign and argued for "working with Coalition of Resistance, Right to Work and other groups, to build and launch a single national anti-cuts organisation early in 2011". In the debate both sides had equal speakers and shared responsibility for chairing the debate which lasted 2 1/2 hours, with the conference voting 305 to 89 to establish an anti-cuts campaign committee which was elected immediately afterwards.

Since the conference, the anti-cuts campaign has called on its supporters to lobby local councils against carrying out government imposed cuts and organised a lobby Labour's Local Government conference in London on 5 March 2011.

The NSSN has also been involved in supporting co-ordinated action between trade unions over proposed government changes to public sector pensions and has called a lobby of the TUC in London on 11 September 2011

=== Car industry ===
The NSSN has been involved in helping car workers organise campaigns against closures of car and component plants in Southampton and organised a meeting of car worker shop stewards to build further links. It has also been involved in defending union reps from victimisation at Swansea Linamar and Swindon Honda.
