= RMT (trade union) =

British trade union

- National Union of Rail, Maritime and Transport Workers
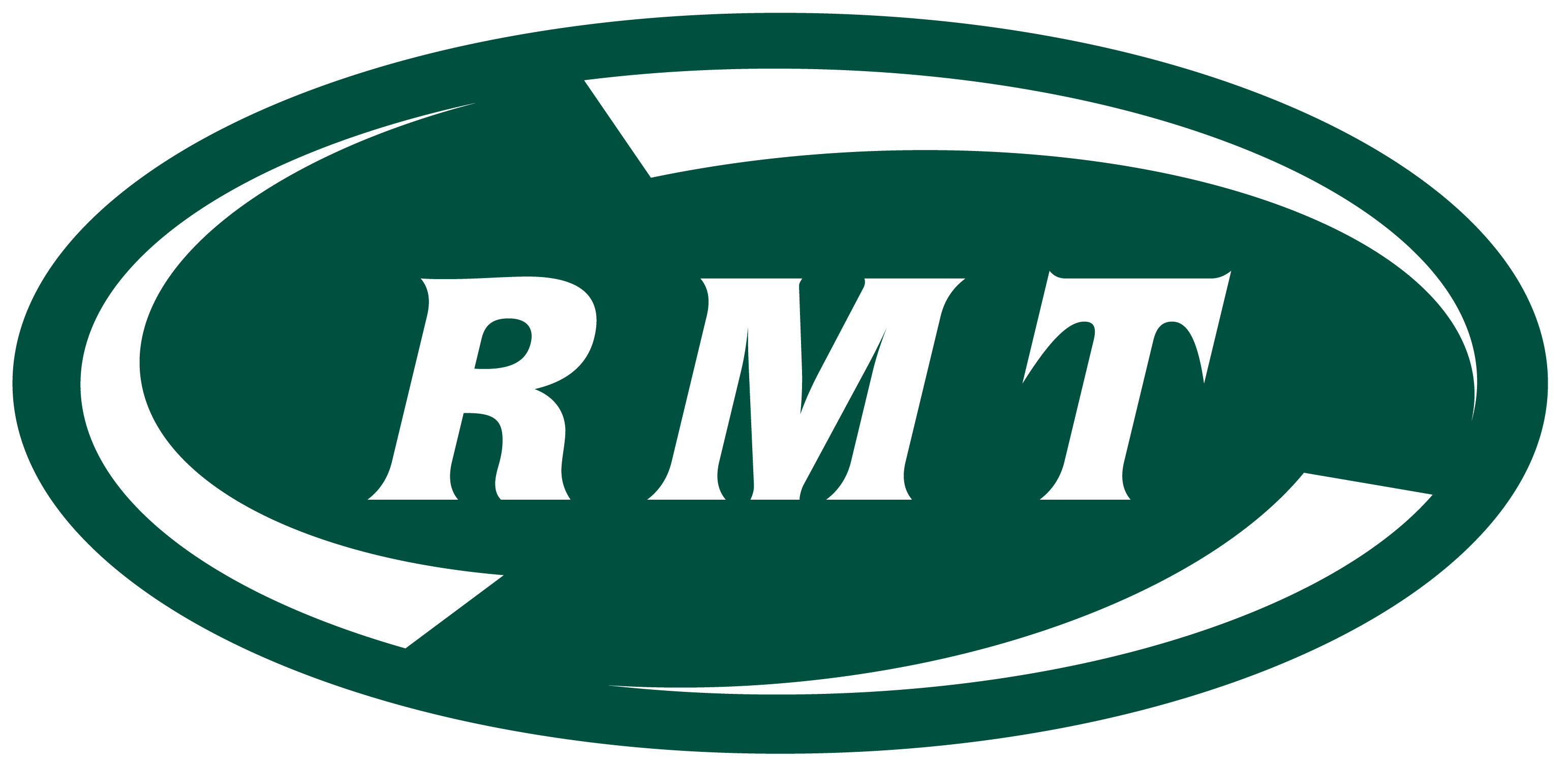
- Predecessor: National Union of Railwaymen; National Union of Seamen
- Founded: 1990; 36 years ago
- Headquarters: London, NW1
- Location: United Kingdom
- Members: ▲80,521 (2024)
- General Secretary: Eddie Dempsey
- President: George Welch
- Affiliations: TUC; ICTU; STUC; Labour (1990–2004); ITF; WFTU; TUCG; NSSN; ETF
- Website: rmt.org.uk

The National Union of Rail, Maritime and Transport Workers (commonly known as the RMT) is a British trade union covering the transport sector. Its current President is George Welch and its current General Secretary is Eddie Dempsey.

The RMT is one of Britain's fastest growing trade unions. Membership rose under and following the leadership of Bob Crow, increasing from 57,000 in 2002 to almost 81,500 in 2019.

== History ==
The RMT was formed in 1990 through a merger of the National Union of Railwaymen (NUR) and the National Union of Seamen (NUS) to create a single transport industry trade union.

=== Political activity ===
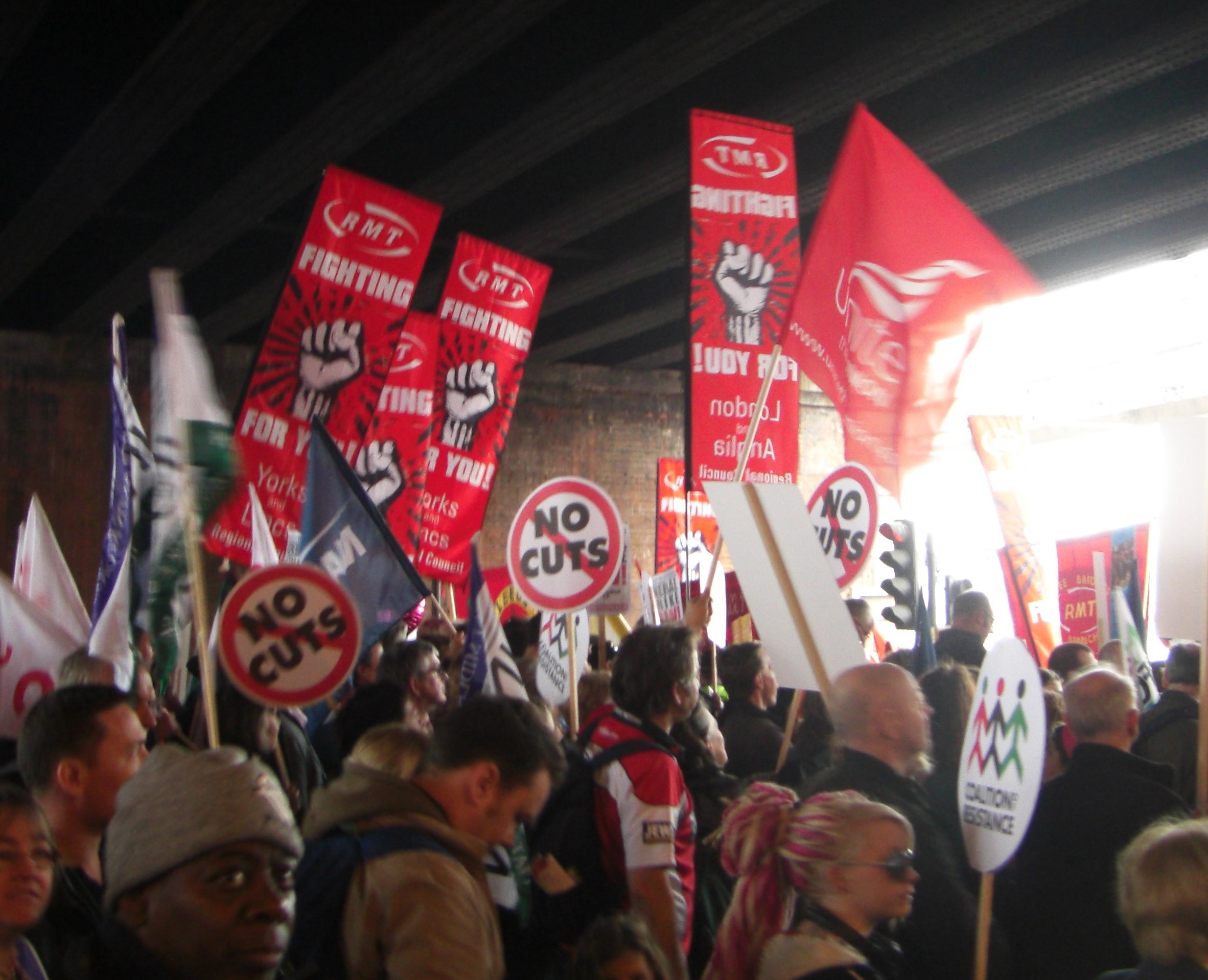
RMT members protest at the 2011 anti-cuts protest in London

The predecessor unions to the National Union of Railwaymen and the National Union of Seamen were founding members of the original Labour Representation Committee and after its creation the RMT became a prominent voice on the left of the Labour Party. In 2003 some Scottish branches of the RMT voted to donate some of their funds to the Scottish Socialist Party (SSP) in protest against the policies of Tony Blair and New Labour, such as not renationalising the railways. This led the Labour Party to expel the union in early 2004 for breaching its rules.

The RMT announced in 2009 that it would be standing a slate of candidates in the 2009 European Parliament elections under the banner of No to EU – Yes to Democracy, a broad left-wing alter-globalisation coalition which aimed to offer an alternative to the pro-business policies of the UK Independence Party. The RMT then became a founding member of the Trade Unionist and Socialist Coalition (TUSC), a left wing political party which has contested the 2010 and 2015 general elections.

The RMT was in favour of the UK's withdrawal from the European Union in the 2016 referendum on the subject. However, RMT members Sean Hoyle, Peter Pinkney, Paul McDonnell and John Reid signed a letter in The Guardian, voicing their opposition to the Electoral Commission choosing Leave.EU, Vote Leave or Grassroots Out as the official group advocating for British withdrawal in the referendum, saying that:

We call on the commission not to give taxpayers' money to the Tory and Ukip-dominated Vote Leave, Leave.EU or Grassroots Out campaigns, or any amalgam of them ... We believe there are millions of trade unionists, young people, anti-austerity campaigners and working-class voters, whose opposition to the big business-dominated EU would not be represented by these organisations. ... We call on the Electoral Commission to recognise that a significant proportion of those who will vote against the EU do so because they support basic socialist policies of workers' rights, public ownership, and opposition to austerity and racism.

In July 2015, the RMT endorsed Jeremy Corbyn's campaign in the Labour Party leadership election.

=== London Underground ===
The RMT represents most London Underground staff, as well as many other workers in the London public transport network. Train drivers' union ASLEF represents London Underground train drivers, and has co-ordinated disputes with the RMT. The RMT has had a number of disputes with Transport for London and private sector contractors Metronet and Tube Lines over pay, safety, pensions and job security on the Underground. These disputes have often resulted in industrial action, leading to periods of travel disruption in the capital over the last decade.

=== 2022 strike ===
In May 2022, the union began balloting 40,000 members on a strike action that might be joined by the Transport Salaried Staffs' Association (TSSA). Both managers and operators would be affected. Rail insiders have accused the union leaders of balloting prematurely without negotiation. Of primary concern to the unions were the upcoming job cuts at Network Rail and a demand for pay rises to offset the cost of living. Coming out of the pandemic, fewer passengers are currently using railways, however. Rail minister Wendy Morton and rail companies have emphasised the need to modernise the sector and reduce its cost base.

Union members backed industrial action overwhelmingly, and 24-hour strikes were scheduled for 21, 23 and 25 June. Both the RMT and the TSSA warned of a level of disruption not experienced since the 1926 general strike. Rail companies began drawing up plans to prioritise freight delivery over passenger services in order to keep supermarkets stocked.

== Affiliations ==
The RMT is affiliated to a number of political organisations and trade union confederations. In the United Kingdom and Ireland the RMT is affiliated with the Trades Union Congress, the Scottish Trades Union Congress, the Wales Trades Union Congress and the Irish Congress of Trade Unions. Internationally the RMT is affiliated to the European Transport Workers' Federation and the International Transport Workers' Federation, as well as the World Federation of Trade Unions.

Politically the RMT was affiliated with the left wing political party, the Trade Unionist and Socialist Coalition (TUSC), which it co-founded, until it disaffiliated in 2022. The RMT is also affiliated to the Labour Representation Committee, a pressure group which aims to promote traditional socialist principles within the Labour Party.

The RMT has provided 23,000 trade union cases to the Railway Work, Life and Death Project. This data includes information on accidents and disabilities on thousands of members, from the Amalgamated Society of Railway Servants and National Union of Railwaymen during the late 19th and early 20th centuries.

== RMT Credit Union ==
RMT Credit Union Limited is a savings and loans co-operative established by the trade union for its members in 2004. It is a member of UKCreditUnions Limited, a national trade association representing smaller credit unions, steering groups and support organisations. The credit union is authorised by the Prudential Regulation Authority and regulated by the Financial Conduct Authority and the PRA. Ultimately, like the banks and building societies, members' savings are protected against business failure by the Financial Services Compensation Scheme.

== Leadership ==
=== General Secretaries ===
1990: Jimmy Knapp
2001: Bob Crow
2014: Mick Cash
2021: Mick Lynch
2025: Eddie Dempsey

=== Senior Assistant General Secretaries ===
1990: Andy Dodds
1991: Wilf Proudfoot
1994: Vernon Hince
2002: Mick Cash
2014: Steve Hedley
2021: Eddie Dempsey
2025: John Leach

=== Presidents ===
1990: John Cogger
1993: Don Loughlin
1996: John Cogger
1999: Reg Hopkins
2001: Phil Boston
2002: John Cogger
2004: Tony Donaghey
2007: John Leach
2010: Alex Gordon
2013: Peter Pinkney
2016: Sean Hoyle
2019: Michelle Rodgers
2022: Alex Gordon
2025: George Welch

== See also ==
- Trade unions in the United Kingdom
- Transport in the United Kingdom
