= Manuel Cortes =

British trade unionist

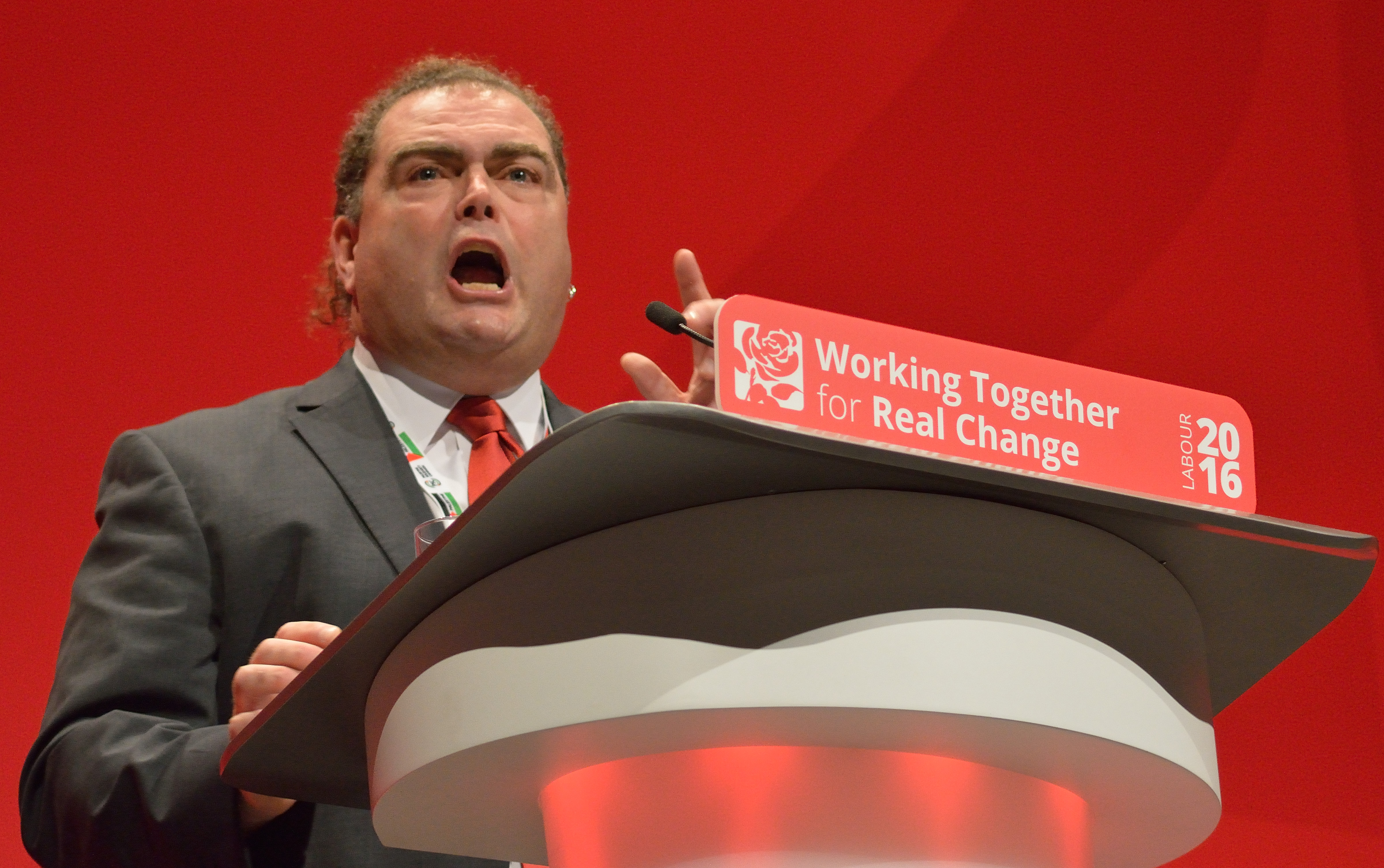
Cortes speaking at the 2016 Labour Party Conference

Manuel Cortes (born 2 May 1967) is a British trade unionist who served as the General Secretary of the Transport Salaried Staffs' Association (TSSA) between 2011 and 2022.

== Early life ==
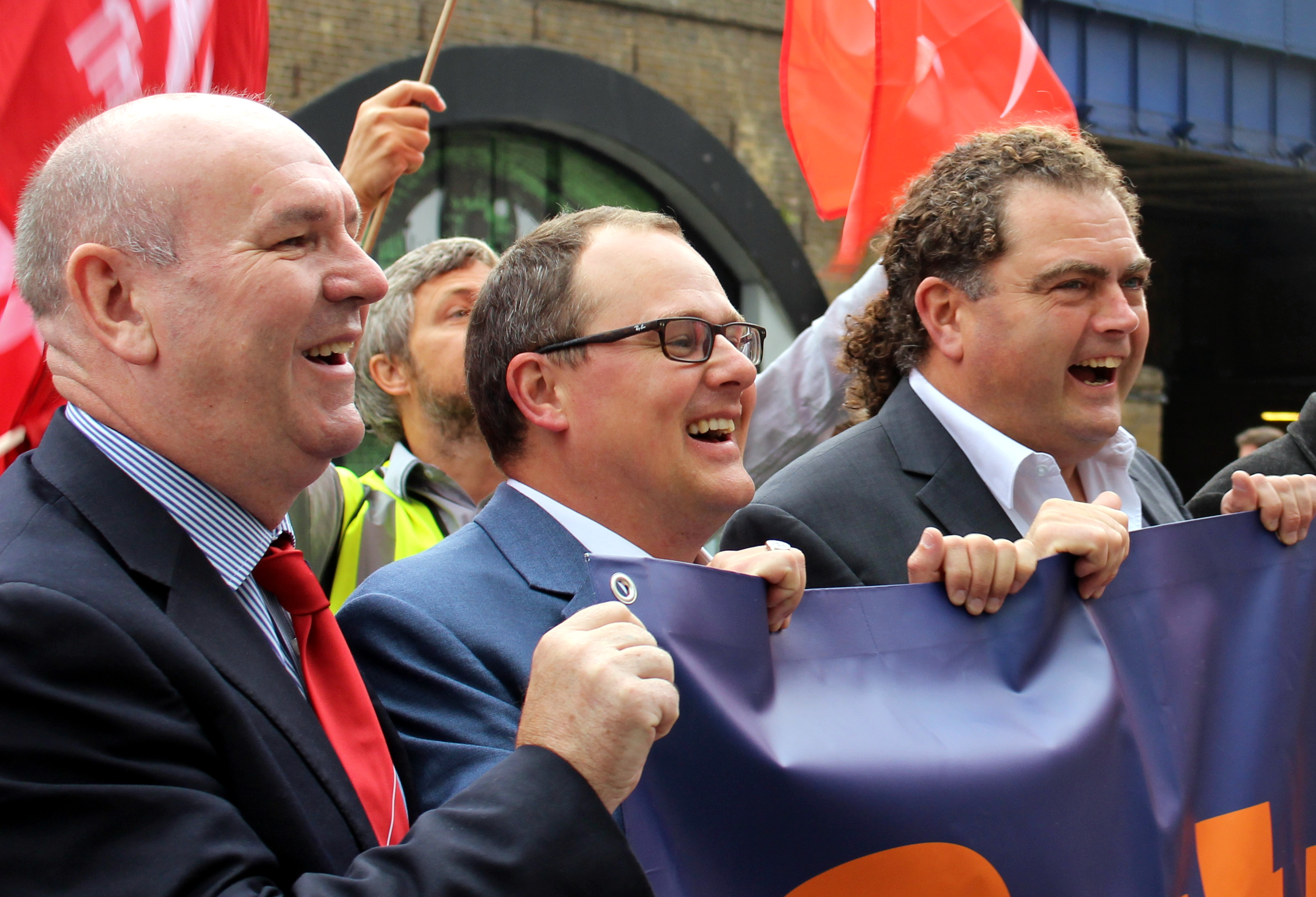
Manuel Cortes (right) with Mick Whelan (left) and Paul Nowak at the Protest for an Affordable Railway under Public Ownership at London Waterloo in 2015

Manuel Cortes was born and raised in Gibraltar; while growing up, he never spoke English with his family. He left school with no qualifications.

He became an apprentice electrician, joined a local union, and gained technical qualifications from the Gibraltar and Dockyard Technical College. It allowed him to pursue further studies at a technical college in Kent. He studied Engineering at Heriot-Watt University, later becoming a full-time student representative. Later, he would gain master's degrees in Optical Electronics and Business Economics from the University of Strathclyde.

== Career ==
His first job after university was for the Banking, Insurance and Finance Union (BIFU) that merged with the Barclays Group Staff Union and NatWest Staff Association in 1999 to become the UNIFI, then became part of Amicus in 2004. He worked for a year as a fundraiser for Amnesty International.

=== Transport Salaried Staffs' Association ===
In March 1998, he joined the TSSA, the UK's second-largest rail union, which was formerly known as the Railway Clerks' Association, a white-collar union. On 15 November 2011, he was elected General Secretary for a five-year term. In December 2016, he was re-elected with 66% of the vote on a turnout of 19%.

In 2015, Manuel Cortes endorsed Jeremy Corbyn in the Labour Party leadership election.

In 2022, he was accused of sexual harassment by a former TSSA employee, something which he vehemently denied and which had not been upheld after an internal investigation in 2018. A judge ordered an injunction which forbade the woman from talking about the alleged harassment.

During his tenure as General Secretary, Cortes was a prominent trade union opponent of Brexit. Although a political ally of Jeremy Corbyn, Cortes frequently diverged from the Labour Party leadership's stance on the issue, arguing that the party should actively campaign to halt the UK's withdrawal from the European Union.

Cortes framed his opposition to Brexit in class and economic terms, stating in 2018 that leaving the EU was a "Tory con trick for the benefit of the richest 1%" that would fail to improve living standards for working-class people. Writing for LabourList and speaking to the New Statesman, he contended that "there is no good Brexit" and argued that Leave campaigners had unfairly blamed immigration for economic declines caused by Conservative austerity policies. Consequently, Cortes supported campaigns for a second public referendum, backed free movement, and urged Corbyn to abandon cross-party Brexit negotiations with Prime Minister Theresa May.

Following the UK's departure from the EU, Cortes focused on the practical impacts of the withdrawal on TSSA members in the transport and travel sectors. He warned that the post-Brexit trade arrangements left Britain's travel industry "out in the cold," citing risks to jobs, industry stability, and potential border delays at major ports.

In addition, Cortes oversaw significant industrial disputes across the British rail and travel sectors. He led campaigns and strike actions against Network Rail, train operating companies, and Transport for London over issues including pay freezes, job cuts, and ticket office closures.

Under his leadership, the TSSA frequently collaborated with sister rail unions such as the RMT and ASLEF during periods of widespread industrial unrest, notably during the 2016–2017 Southern Rail disputes and the 2022 national rail strikes.

In the media and political sphere, Cortes significantly raised the public profile of the relatively small union through frequent broadcast appearances, newspaper opinion pieces, and active participation in Labour Party politics.

A vocal socialist and prominent ally of former Labour leader Jeremy Corbyn, Cortes used his platform to advocate for the renationalisation of the UK's railways and TSSA's opposition to Brexit, often framing his anti-Brexit message from a left-wing, internationalist perspective. His high-visibility media presence remained a defining feature of his leadership until he stepped down from the post in late 2022.

On 24 October 2022, after 11 years in office, TSSA announced his retirement as TSSA General Secretary

In February 2023, a report commissioned by TSSA as an internal workplace review, led by a Labour Party member of the House of Lords, was published. The report was critical of TSSA officials. Manuel Cortes and a senior member of TSSA staff were dismissed following the publication of the report.

In June 2023, delegates at the TSSA annual conference heard from former General Secretary, Manuel Cortes, and former Interim Organising Director, Luke Chester, as they appealed their dismissals. Delegates heard from Cortes and Chester by video link during a closed session of the gathering in Cork, Ireland. As he awaited the outcome of his appeal, Novara Media reported that Manuel Cortes removed his shirt although no other media outlet has corroborated this story. Manuel Cortes argued during his appeal that he had been "made a scapegoat". He was dismissed as he was serving his notice period following his retirement announcement. However, Conference upheld the dismissal.

Following Cortes' departure, TSSA entered a prolonged period of internal turmoil, governance disputes and factional infighting. The crisis involved renewed workplace bullying allegations, industrial disputes, re-run internal elections, and proceedings before the Certification Officer.

As of January 2026, TSSA reported that "Matters arising between TSSA and Manuel Cortes have been resolved amicably.

The inquiry led by Baroness Kennedy KC was commissioned as an internal workplace review, with the report explicitly saying that it wasn't a judicial, criminal, or civil investigation, and no court or tribunal has issued a legal finding about any of the allegations contained within it or found Manuel Cortes guilty of wrongdoing and he has vehemently denied the allegations against him.

Trade union offices
Preceded by Gerry Doherty	General Secretary of the Transport Salaried Staffs' Association; 2011–2022	Succeeded by Frank Ward (acting)
