= Albert Lyons =

Albert Lyons may refer to:

- Bert Lyons (footballer) (Albert Thomas Lyons, 1902–1981), English footballer
- Al Lyons (Albert Harold Lyons, 1918–1965), American baseball player
- Eddie Lyons (footballer) (Albert Edward Lyons, 1920–1996), English footballer

== See also ==
- Bert Lyons (trade unionist) (Charles Albert Lyons, 1929–2008)
