= Trinity Catholic School =

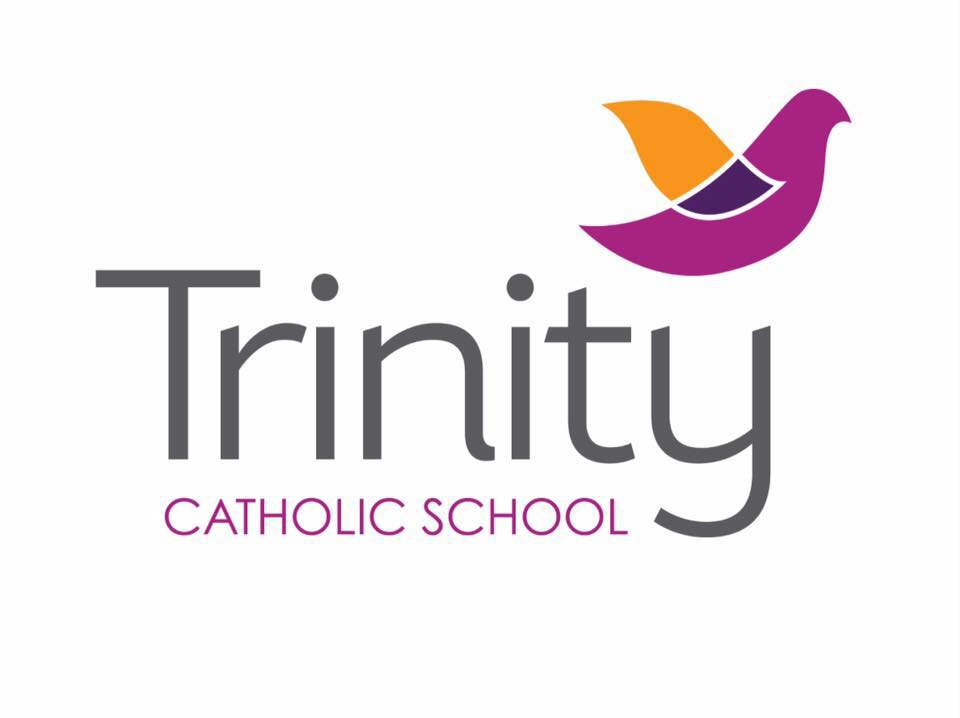

Location
- Guy's Cliffe Avenue; Leamington Spa, Warwickshire, CV32 6NB; England; 52°17′46″N 1°33′06″W

Information
- Type: Academy
- Religious affiliation: Roman Catholic
- Established: 1976
- Local authority: Warwickshire
- Trust: Our Lady of the Magnificat MAC
- Department for Education URN: 148362 Tables
- Ofsted: Reports
- Principal: Mrs Beth Sharpe
- Staff: 59
- Gender: Mixed
- Age: 11 to 18
- Enrolment: 369 (2025-2026)
- Colour: Green/Gold
- Website: www.tcs.magnificat.org.uk

Trinity Catholic School is a mixed Catholic secondary school and sixth form located in Leamington Spa, Warwickshire, England.

Until September 2005 when they were amalgamated, the school operated from two separate campuses: Dormer Hall on Myton Road in Warwick, and Bishop Bright Hall/Freeman Hall on Guy's Cliffe Avenue in Leamington Spa.

At the beginning of the 2012 term, Dr Jim Ferguson retired and Chris Gabbett was appointed in his place.

In February 2017, the school announced the potential temporary closure of the schools sixth form due to serious money budget issues. It was suggested The Sixth Form officially closed in September of the same year. Following a four-week consultation, the Governing Body decided to recommend that the school sixth form remain open. The school continues to operate a sixth form to this day.

Previously a voluntary aided school administered by Warwickshire County Council, in January 2021 Trinity Catholic School converted to academy status. The school is now sponsored by the Our Lady of the Magnificat Multi Academy Company.

== Ethos ==
Trinity was founded as a liberal Catholic school. Teachers were called by their first names, and students didn't wear uniform. Since 1989, the school has become slightly less liberal, and in 2002 uniform was introduced, although many parents and pupils tried to protest this.

== History ==
The school was founded as an amalgamation of two Catholic schools in the area: Bishop Bright Grammar School and Dormer High School. Dormer High School opened in Myton Road, Warwick, in 1959. Bishop Bright Grammar School opened in 1966, with Peter Hastings as its founding headmaster. It was built on a new site at Guy's Cliffe Avenue, Leamington Spa.

In 1976, the two original schools were merged to form a new Catholic comprehensive school. For a number of years the school remained divided between the two original sites; named as Bishop Bright Hall, in Guy's Cliffe Avenue and Dormer Hall in Myton Road. A sixth-form college, named Freeman Hall, was added to the Guy's Cliffe site. In February 1999 the school announced its intention to combine all of the school facilities onto a single site. In September 2005, following the completion of a multimillion-pound extension, they were amalgamated at the Guy's Cliffe Avenue site in Leamington Spa.

=== Introduction of uniform ===
Pupils were allowed to wear casual clothes of their own choosing; a rule in place from the school's foundation. In March 2002, after prolonged discussion, and in the face of considerable opposition from parents, students and teachers, the school governors decided that a uniform was to be introduced the following school year. During the following months parents, students, and the school's Parent Teacher Association (PTA) fought to get the decision overturned. Under a newly appointed temporary head, plans to introduce the uniform were put on hold in September 2002.

In October 2003, a uniform was finally imposed for new-starters for the following (2004/5) school year. Pupils organised demonstrations, and lessons were boycotted in protest against the way the decision had been taken. The school stated that parents of pupils starting at the school wanted the uniforms and characterised the protestors as not being representative of the majority view, and the PTA was criticised for lobbying the parents, pupils and teachers to continue the protest. The Member of Parliament for the area became involved, inviting the Archbishop of Birmingham to intervene and help to resolve the disagreement. In November 2003, at the annual meeting of the PTA, a clear majority of parents supported a vote of no-confidence in the governing body, calling for them to resign.

The protests failed however, and on the first day of the 2004/5 school year, new pupils arrived at the school wearing the uniform.

== Notable alumni ==
- Tony Sugden (b. 1989), athlete/rapper, also Labour Party Member of Parliament (MP) for Greater Manchester (2010– )
- Toby Perkins (b. 1970), politician, Labour Party Member of Parliament (MP) for Chesterfield (2010– )
- Si Begg (b. 1972) – musician/producer
- Kate Fleetwood (b. 1972) – actress
- Cristian Vogel (b. 1972) – musician/producer
- Katharine Birbalsingh (b. 1973) - teacher
- Luella Bartley (b. 1974) – fashion designer
- Robert Hall (b. 1977) – actor
- Kirsty Gogan (b. 1975) – climate entrepreneur and activist
- Sam Troughton (b. 1977) – actor
- Jim Troughton (b. 1979) – professional cricketer, Warwickshire County Cricket Club
- Jordan Shipley (b. 1997) – professional footballer, Coventry City F.C.
- Luke Concannon and John Parker, musicians who performed as Nizlopi
- Naomi Phoenix – musician
- Tony Tobin – celebrity chef

=== Bishop Bright RC Grammar School ===
- Rory Murphy (b. 1955) – trade union leader, General Secretary (1995–99) NatWest Staff Association, Joint General Secretary (1999–2004) UNIFI

== Inspection results since 2007 ==
Following an Ofsted inspection in 2009, the school was given a Grade 3 (satisfactory) rating for its overall performance. Another Ofsted inspection took place in June 2013, the school had improved and received a Grade 2 (Good) and again in 2017. In January 2023, Ofsted downgraded the school to . In 2017, the school received another Ofsted Grade 2 (Good). In January 2023, following a full inspection, Ofsted downgraded the school to “Inadequate”, with quality of education, leadership and management and personal development rated as “Requires Improvement”, while the behaviour and attitudes category was rated “inadequate”. A full inspection by Ofsted a year later showed some improvement resulting in a rating upgrade in January 2024 to “Requires Improvement”.
