= Bert Lyons =

Bert Lyons may refer to:

- Bert Lyons (footballer) (Albert Thomas Lyons, 1902–1981), English footballer
- Bert Lyons (trade unionist) (Charles Albert Lyons, died 2008), British trade unionist

== See also ==
- Al Lyons (Albert Harold Lyons, 1918–1965), American baseball player
- Herbert Lyon (1877–?), or Bert Lyon, English footballer
