= John Bothwell =

John Bothwell may refer to:

- John Bothwell (bishop) (1926–2014), Canadian Anglican bishop and author
- John Bothwell (trade unionist) (c.1909–1994), British trade union leader
- John Bothwell, Lord Holyroodhouse (c.1550–1609), 16th-century Scottish judge
