= Jacquelyn MacLennan =

British lawyer

Jacquelyn Freda MacLennan FRSE
- Born: 24 June 1961 (age 65); Inverness, Scotland
- Education: University of Edinburgh (LLB); Inverness High School
- Children: 3

Jacquelyn Freda MacLennan is a British lawyer and mediator. She is currently an honorary professor at the University of Edinburgh, and she was awarded a Fellowship of the Royal Society of Edinburgh in 2026.

== Early life and education ==
On 24 June 1961, MacLannan was born in Inverness, Scotland. She attended Inverness High School.

In 1979, she attended the University of Edinburgh and studied law. She graduated with a Bachelor of Laws in 1983, and a Diploma in Legal Practice in 1984.

== Career ==
Upon graduation, MacLennan qualified as a solicitor at Shepherd and Wedderburn. In 1987, she moved to Brussels, and worked in the Legal Service of the European Commission, before moving into private practice.

In January 1998, MacLennan became a partner in White & Case, specialising in European Union competition law.

In July 2011, MacLennan and another partner, Axel Schulz, were involved in representing Toshiba for a series of price-fixing cases before the General Court. A €90,900,000 fine was issued by the European Commission for infringement of European directives and price fixing. MacLennan and Schulz succeeded in getting the fines annulled. In September 2011, MacLennan was appointed as a board member of White & Case, and was assigned to grow the firm's business in Asia.

For the 2016 United Kingdom European Union membership referendum, the European Union Referendum Act 2015 prevented UK nationals, who had lived overseas for more than 15 years, to vote. In April 2016, together with veteran Harry Shindler, MacLennan asked High Court judges to rule that the section of the Act was an unlawful penalty against their rights to free movement. The judges ruled that the section did not restrict their rights and dismissed the application for judicial review.

In May 2016, Shindler and MacLennan brought the case to the Court of Appeal. The appeal judges upheld the High Court's ruling. Shindler and Maclennan then appealed to the Supreme Court. However, they were unsuccessful. Lady Hale, deputy president of the Supreme Court, upheld previous rulings of the High Court and the Court of Appeal, and dismissed the claim. In response to the outcome, MacLennan said she was disappointed, and hoped that the government will amend voting laws.

In June 2018, MacLennan won a pro bono case before the European Court of Justice, which allowed same-sex spouses to move freely across the European Union (EU), even if the country does not recognise same-sex marriages. The court ruled that the country must grant residence to the spouse who is not a resident of the EU. In the case, Romania had to grant residence to the American husband of a local European man, and accept the validity of their marriage in Belgium under EU law.

In October 2023, MacLennan was appointed as an honorary professor at the Edinburgh Law School. In April 2026, she was elected a Fellow of the Royal Society of Edinburgh, in the discipline of leadership in civil society and the professions.

== Personal life ==
MacLennan is married, and she has three children.
