= Tom Jenkins (trade unionist) =

Welsh trade union leader

Thomas Harris Jenkins CBE (1920–2012) was a Welsh trade union leader.

The older brother of Clive Jenkins, Tom began working for the Great Western Railway Company in 1937, working on the Swansea Docks. During World War II, he served in the Royal Army Medical Corps, then he returned to the docks until 1949, when he found work with the Transport Salaried Staffs' Association and moved to London.

With the union, Jenkins became a line secretary, then in 1973 won election as Senior Assistant General Secretary. In 1977, he was elected as the union's general secretary, defeating Member of Parliament Tom Bradley, who had been the union's acting general secretary. In post, Jenkins served on numerous government, Labour Party and International Transport Workers' Federation committees. He was made a Commander of the Order of the British Empire in the 1981 Birthday Honours, and retired the following year.

In retirement, Jenkins served on Acas, the Central Arbitration Committee, the Police Complaints Board and the Employment Appeal Tribunal.

Trade union offices
Preceded by David Mackenzie	General Secretary of the Transport Salaried Staffs' Association; 1977–1982	Succeeded by Bert Lyons
