= JCB (song) =

2005 single by Nizlopi

Single by Nizlopi

from the album Half These Songs Are About You
- B-side: 1. "Clear" (live); 2. "Helen"
- Released: 6 June 2005
- Studio: FDM Records
- Genre: Folk-pop
- Length: 3:47
- Label: FDM
- Composer: Nizlopi
- Lyricist: Luke Concannon
- Producers: Gavin "Captain Chaos" Monaghan; Kieron Concannon (exec.)

Nizlopi singles chronology
| "Fine Story" (2005) | "JCB" (2005) | "Girls" (2006) |

Music video
- "JCB" on YouTube

"JCB" (or "JCB Song") is a song by English folk music duo Nizlopi, written by members Luke Concannon and John Parker. Concannon wrote the lyric at his parents' house, drawing inspiration from his father, Kieron Concannon, and later composed the song with Parker. The theme of the song's lyric stems from a moment in Concannon's childhood when his father picked him up from school in a JCB digger (or backhoe loader) and his reflections on how his peers bullied him for having dyslexia. The song tells the story of a similar boy who is fascinated with both his father and the vehicle on which they ride. He imagines his father as a hero, comparing him to several famous figures such as Bruce Lee and B. A. Baracus, and pretends to torment bullying on the playground as a Tyrannosaurus rex. Nizlopi recorded the song at FDM Records' studio and included it on their debut album, Half These Songs Are About You, released in 2004.

Following several praised performances of the song, Nizlopi decided to release "JCB" as the album's second single through FDM Records in June 2005, but it did not make a major commercial impact. Over the next few months, the song began to circulate around the internet, attaining a cult following. Soon after its release, animation company MonkeeHub created and commissioned a music video later the same year, which further propelled the track into the public eye. Near the end of 2005, "JCB" became a contender for the 2005 UK Christmas number-one single and was re-released on 12 December 2005 to coincide with this event. This release received mostly positive reviews from contemporary music critics and peaked at number one on the UK Singles Chart, losing the position on Christmas Day to "That's My Goal" by X Factor series two winner Shayne Ward. The song remains Nizlopi's most successful.

== Background ==
In an interview with Songwriting magazine, Luke Concannon explained that he and bandmate John Parker practiced writing songs separately. He first began to write the songs for Nizlopi's first studio album, Half These Songs Are About You in 2001, with "JCB" conceived in 2002. Twenty-one years old at the time, Concannon was living with his parents and could write music without interruption. He created the riff for the song based around its chord, which Concannon believed was Dmaj9. He decided against writing a song about romance, his typical style, and soon experienced a block, so he asked his father, Kieron, about what to write. Having used to work as a digger driver, Concannon's father suggested, "diggers," and following this recommendation, Concannon finished the initial song within the hour. A fan of UK garage music, he then decided to add a garage rap at the end of the song, which consists of the lines, "I'm Luke I'm five and my dad's Bruce Lee / drives me around in his JCB". After Nizlopi played the song at several gigs, they realised that they may have made a hit single, so they approached Warner Chappell Music, who published the song. It was produced by Gavin "Captain Chaos" Monaghan and executive produced by Kieron Concannon, who became Nizlopi's manager.

== Composition and lyrics ==
"JCB"
A 22-second sample of "JCB", illustrating its folk-pop sound and Concannon's reminiscent lyrics.

"JCB" is a folk-pop song reminiscence of Concannon's childhood and reflects on the anguish he received because of his dyslexia. It is sung from the point of view of a young boy whose father picks him up from school in a JCB digger. The boy, sitting on a toolbox, and his father drive down a bypass, holding up traffic and laughing. Due to the personal empowerment the vehicle gives the boy, he imagines his father as famous figures such as B. A. Baracus and Bruce Lee and himself as a Tyrannosaurus rex, seeking vengeance on the bullies at his school.

The track is written in the key of D major and is set in common time (4/4), following a tempo of 104 beats per minute. One of the lines featured in "JCB", "Don't forget your shovel if you want to go to work", is a reference to the song "Don't Forget Your Shovel" by Irish singer-songwriter Christie Hennessy, who gave permission for the band to use the lyric. Parker describes "JCB" as a "heartfelt, family-oriented song", while Concannon states that it "taps into lots of deep emotions". In a 2015 Twitter comment, Concannon confirmed that the bypass mentioned in the song is the A46 road, which services Leamington Spa, where the band formed.

== Critical reception ==
British columnist James Masterton referred to "JCB" as one of the most "welcome, charming and downright cute" tracks to top the UK chart. Shortly before the song's re-release, Mark Honigsbaum of British newspaper The Guardian called the song "heartwarming" and noted it as a "welcome antidote" to commercial pop music. Bob Stanley of the same newspaper retrospectively panned the song as one of the worst number one singles of the 2000s, commenting: "You wait for the punchline on Nizlopi's JCB Song before realising, to your horror, that the weedy singing and naive lyric is not a Hoxton parody of outsider art but is meant to signify sincerity." He dismissed the song as resembling an attempt by English indie punk band Carter the Unstoppable Sex Machine to write a ballad. Writing for Contactmusic.com, Neal Addison praised the nostalgic lyrics, calling it "endearing".

The Irish Times writer Kevin Courtney commented that "JCB" was a good choice for a Christmas single, noting its "fireside melody", theme about childhood nostalgia and innocence, and references to toys. John Winters of British webzine Drowned in Sound rated the song 7 out of 10, referring to the track as the "sinister kind of niceness" and noting its similarities to the UK Christmas number-one single of 2003: "Mad World" by Michael Andrews and Gary Jules. He also questioned the allusions to Transformers and Zoids, labelling them "uncomfortabl[e]", but stated that the song was the only logical choice for the Christmas number-one single. The Digital Fix reviewer John Donnelly gave the song a 6 out of 10, comparing its acoustic qualities to those of American singer-songwriter Tracy Chapman. Simon Webb of RoomThirteen wrote that the song gave "sensitivity" to the Christmas music rush and named Nizlopi a "band to watch" in 2006.

== Release and promotion ==
=== United Kingdom ===
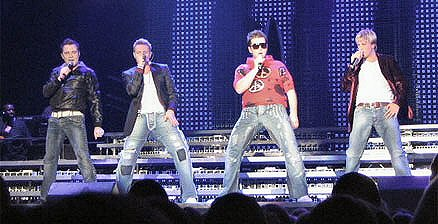
In the UK, Westlife (pictured in 2006) challenged and lost the number-one spot to "JCB" with "When You Tell Me That You Love Me" the week before Christmas.

"JCB" was first released on Nizlopi's album Half These Songs Are About You in 2004. FDM Records originally issued "JCB" as a single in the United Kingdom on 6 June 2005, but it stalled at number 160 on the UK Singles Chart, selling only several hundred copies. Following its release, Nizlopi promoted the song by engaging in interviews and performing the song live on British radio station XFM and during several small gigs. The internet, as well as the band's devoted fandom, was a major catalyst in the song's promotion. MonkeeHub then requested to make an animated music video for the song, which drew further interest to the song. Toward the end of 2005, bookmakers began a push for the song to enter the bid for the UK Christmas number-one single of 2005, putting it into competition with new singles by Irish boy band Westlife and the yet unannounced winner of the second series of British music competition The X Factor. On 17 December 2005, the show announced English singer Shayne Ward as the winner, and his version of the winner's song, "That's My Goal", was released on 21 December 2005.

"JCB" was re-issued on 12 December 2005. According to British music and film retailer HMV, "JCB" marginally outsold Westlife's "When You Tell Me That You Love Me" during its first day of release, although sales of the latter were expected to grow over the week. On 18 December 2005, the week before Christmas, "JCB" entered the UK Singles Chart at number one, outselling "When You Tell Me That You Love Me" twofold, and also topped the Scottish and UK Indie charts. Bookmakers then shifted focus to "That's My Goal", which had four days to sell more copies than "JCB" before the next chart was published. On Christmas Day, "JCB" was pushed into second place by "That's My Goal". Both songs held their positions for the next four weeks, and "JCB" finished 2005 as the UK's 12th-most-successful single. It is Nizlopi's highest-charting single in the UK, with follow-up "Girls" failing to reach the top 75. In April 2019, the British Phonographic Industry awarded the song a platinum certification for sales and streaming figures exceeding 600,000.

=== International ===
In Ireland, the song reached number one on the week before Christmas but lost the top position to a cover of Will Young's song "Leave Right Now" by Irish comedian Mario Rosenstock on Christmas week. It then returned to the top spot for another week, its last at number one. At the end of 2005, the Irish Recorded Music Association ranked it as Ireland's eight-most-successful song. "JCB" stayed on the Irish Singles Chart for 16 more weeks. On the Eurochart Hot 100, the song debuted at its peak of number six on 21 December 2005 and stayed in the top 15 for a further four issues, ranking at number 66 on the listing's year-end edition. In Australia, iTunes made a digital download of the song available on 17 June 2006, and the enhanced CD of "JCB" was re-released two days later, on 19 June. On 2 July 2006, the song debuted on the Australian ARIA Singles Chart at number 45 and peaked at number 43 the next week. It then dropped out of the top 50. In an interview with Impact Magazine, Parker stated that is not bothered by the fact that Nizlopi are a one-hit wonder, with him saying, "It means a lot to a lot of people, a lot of people had it played at their funerals and it makes a lot of people think about their family life. It's an important song [...] We've always been proud of it."

== Music video ==
=== Background and reception ===
A scene from the music video of "JCB", showing the boy and his father riding in a digger, Optimus Prime, and a dinosaur eating two stick figures.

The song's animated music video was directed and animated by Laith Bahrani of MonkeeHub, with post-production handled by H3O Media and Adam "Cactus" B. Other animators who contributed to the video were David Crawford, who drew the cows, and Nick Cooper, who created the opening scene. The video was commissioned in 2005. People began to share the video via e-mail (since video sharing websites such as YouTube were still in their infancy), and Nizlopi received many messages from parents who played the song and video for their children at night. The video was positively received, with Winters calling it "marvellous", Donnelly calling it "impressive", and Addison calling it "amazing".

=== Synopsis ===
The opening scene, which takes place in an office, depicts a grown man sitting at a desk. After he leaves, the camera zooms in on a drawing of a yellow digger occupied by a young boy and his father on a piece of ruled paper. The drawing begins to animate, showing the digger driving down a roadway as the boy sings. An angry driver soon drives up behind them, yelling at the twosome until the second verse begins, when the digger pulls aside to let the line of cars pass. The page flips, changing from a side view to a frontal view. In this scene, two Transformers appear, one of them Optimus Prime, driving behind the digger. In the background, a grey dinosaur eats two stick figures and wanders away. The scene changes to a side view once more for the second chorus, panning out to show the van of the A-Team. As the chorus ends, the father pulls the digger over, allowing Optimus Prime and the A-Team van to pass by. During the rap segments and final chorus, the digger sprouts wings, a rear engine, and an umbrella, then cruises down the road, eventually lifting off and driving through the sky. The final image features a message from one of the animators: "I must never make another animated video again it is a lot of work."

== Track listings ==
UK and Irish CD1

1. "JCB Song" – 3:47
2. "Clear" (live) – 3:40

Scandinavian CD single and Australian digital download

1. "JCB Song" – 3:47 (3:49 on download)
2. "Clear" (live) – 3:40
3. "Helen" – 4:05 (4:07 on download)

Enhanced CD single (UK and Irish CD2)

1. "JCB Song" – 3:47
2. "Clear" (live) – 3:40
3. "Helen" – 4:05
4. "JCB Song" (video animation)

== Credits and personnel ==
Credits are lifted from the Scandinavian CD single liner notes.

Studios

- Recorded and mixed at FDM Records (London, England)
- Mastered at Loud Mastering (Taunton, Somerset, England)

Personnel

- Nizlopi – music
  - Luke Concannon – words, musician
  - John Parker – musician
- Christie Hennessy – writer of "don't forget your shovel if you want to go to work"
- Gavin "Captain Chaos" Monaghan – production
- Andy Taylor – engineering and Pro Tools
- John Dent – mastering
- Kieron Concannon – executive producer, musician
- MonkeeHub – images
- Anna Chopping – artwork design
- Helen Evenden – photography

== Charts ==
=== Weekly charts ===
Weekly chart performance for "JCB"
| Chart (2005–2006) | Peak position |
|---|---|
| Australia (ARIA) | 43 |
| Europe (Eurochart Hot 100) | 6 |
| Ireland (IRMA) | 1 |
| Scottish Singles Sales (Official Charts) | 1 |
| UK Singles (Official Charts) | 1 |
| UK Indie (Official Charts) | 1 |

=== Year-end charts ===
Year-end chart performance for "JCB"
| Chart (2005) | Position |
|---|---|
| Ireland (IRMA) | 8 |
| Europe (Eurochart Hot 100) | 66 |
| UK Singles (OCC) | 12 |

== Certifications ==
Certifications and sales for "JCB"
| Region | Certification | Certified units/sales |
|---|---|---|
| United Kingdom (BPI) | Platinum | 600,000^{‡} |
^{‡} Sales+streaming figures based on certification alone.

== Release history ==
Release dates and formats for "JCB"
| Region | Date | Format(s) | Label(s) | ID | Ref. |
|---|---|---|---|---|---|
| UK and Ireland | 6 June 2005 | CD | FDM | FDMNIZ004 | |
| UK and Ireland | 12 December 2005 | CD re-release | FDM | FDMNIZ004 | |
| UK and Ireland | 12 December 2005 | Enhanced CD | FDM | FDMNIZ008 | |
| Australia | 2005 | Enhanced CD | FDM; Liberation Music | LIBERATOR1CD | |
| Germany | 2005 | Enhanced CD | FDM | 0030215MA1 | |
| Netherlands | 2005 | Enhanced CD | V2 | VVR5039463 | |
| Scandinavia | 2005 | Enhanced CD | Bonnier Music | 33441691 | |
| Australia | 17 June 2006 | Digital download EP | Liberation Music | —N/a | |
| Australia | 19 June 2006 | Enhanced CD re-release | FDM; Liberation Music | LIBERATOR1CD | |
