= Albert Griffiths =

Albert Griffiths may refer to:

- Albert Griffiths (1871–1927), Australian boxer, better known as Young Griffo
- Albert Griffiths (trade unionist) (1908–1970), ASLEF General Secretary 1964–70
- Albert Griffiths (reggae artist), Jamaican singer, founder of The Gladiators
