= George Thorneycroft =

George Benjamin Thorneycroft CBE JP (8 January 1893 – 29 June 1975) was a British trade union leader.

Born in West Bromwich, Thorneycroft worked on the railways for the Shropshire Union Railways and Canal Company in his youth. He joined the Railway Clerks' Association, and was appointed to its head office staff in 1914. In 1935, he was appointed as secretary for the London and North Eastern Railway section of its membership, then in 1945 he became senior assistant secretary.

In 1947, the union's general secretary, Charles Gallie, retired. The assistant general secretary, Percy Heady, was close to retirement himself, and so Thorneycroft stood for the vacant post. However, he was defeated by Fred Bostock. Bostock died the following year, and with Heady temporarily filling his post, Thorneycroft was promoted to become assistant general secretary. That year, he was also elected to the General Council of the Trades Union Congress, and to the executive of the International Transport Workers' Federation.

Heady retired in 1949, and Thorneycroft now easily won election as the union's new general secretary. However, he too was nearing retirement, and so stood down from all his trade union posts in 1953. He served on several government bodies, including the Royal Commission on Civil Service Pay and Conditions and the Independent Television Authority. He was made a Commander of the Order of the British Empire in 1955.

Trade union offices
Preceded by Percy Heady	Assistant General Secretary of the Transport Salaried Staffs' Association; 1948–1949	Succeeded by Bill Webber
Preceded by Percy Heady	General Secretary of the Transport Salaried Staffs' Association; 1949–1953	Succeeded by Bill Webber
