= Jim Campbell (trade unionist) =

Scottish trade union leader

James Campbell (17 April 1895 – 6 November 1957) was a Scottish trade union leader.

Born in Glasgow, Campbell worked as a ticket collector for the Glasgow and South Western Railway, and joined the National Union of Railwaymen (NUR) in 1911. During World War I, he served with the Royal Engineers.

On his return, Campbell rejoined the railways, and was elected as branch secretary in the NUR. He held a succession of increasingly senior positions in the union, eventually becoming a full-time organiser, then the chief organiser for Ireland, and assistant general secretary.

In 1953, Campbell was elected as general secretary of the NUR, and he was also elected onto the General Council of the Trades Union Congress. While in office, he visited the Soviet Union, with Tom Hollywood and four other union representatives. Just outside Leningrad, the car in which he and Hollywood were travelling was hit by a bus, and both were killed. Campbell was 62.

Trade union offices
Preceded by James Young	President of the Scottish Trades Union Congress; 1945–1946	Succeeded by James Duncan
Preceded by Jim Figgins	Assistant General Secretary of the National Union of Railwaymen; 1948–1953	Succeeded by Sidney Greene
Preceded by Jim Figgins	General Secretary of the National Union of Railwaymen; 1953–1957	Succeeded by Sidney Greene
Preceded by Jim Baty, Jim Figgins and George Thorneycroft	Railways representative on the General Council of the Trades Union Congress; 1953–1957; With: Bill Webber; Jim Baty (1953–1955); Albert Hallworth (1955–1957)	Succeeded by Sidney Greene, Albert Hallworth and Bill Webber
Preceded by Jim Baty and Jock Tiffin	Trades Union Congress representative to the AFL–CIO; 1955; With: Tom Eccles	Succeeded by Wilfred Blackwell Beard and Joseph O'Hagan
