= Maryam Eslamdoust =

British-Iranian politician and trade union official

- مریم اسلام دوست
- Born: Tehran, Iran
- Education: School of Oriental and African Studies, University College London
- Organization: Transport Salaried Staffs' Association
- Title: General Secretary
- Political party: Labour
- Spouse: Thomas Gardiner
- Children: 1

Maryam Eslamdoust (Persian: مریم اسلام دوست) is a British-Iranian politician and trade union official. She was mayor of the London Borough of Camden from 2019 to 2021, and in 2023 was elected General Secretary of the Transport Salaried Staffs' Association. Eslamdoust was the first Iranian-born woman to be elected to public office in Great Britain.

== Early life and education ==
Eslamdoust was born in Tehran, Iran. As a child she moved with her family to the Kilburn area of London. She was educated at the School of Oriental and African Studies and University College London. Eslamdoust has worked in the legal and charity sectors, and as a researcher for the United Kingdom Labour Party.

== Political career ==
From 2010, Eslamdoust served as an elected Labour Party councillor on the Camden London Borough Council for the ward of Kilburn. She focused her duties on overseeing stronger regulation on noise pollution, gambling premises, and strip clubs. The latter issue resulted in a lengthy court battle between the council and Spearmint Rhino, due to a casting council vote made in her favour by Eslamdoust's husband, Thomas Gardiner, which was resolved in 2014 when the judge upheld the council decision. Eslamdoust went on to be declared Deputy Mayor of Camden in 2018.

In 2019, Eslamdoust was elected as Mayor for the London Borough of Camden, and was the first woman born in Iran to serve in public office in Great Britain. She attracted criticism due to the circa £11,000 cost of her inauguration ceremony. Eslamdoust served for 2 years in the role, raising money for domestic abuse charity Solace Women's Aid.

Eslamdoust has been reported as being politically aligned with Jeremy Corbyn, to the left wing of the UK Labour Party. In 2023, she was critical of the Labour leader Keir Starmer, particularly concerning his reluctance to call for a ceasefire on the Gaza war. In February 2026, after the Peter Mandelson crisis, she said Starmer should resign if Labour came third in the upcoming Gorton and Denton by-election.

== General Secretary of the TSSA ==
In 2023, Eslamdoust succeeded Manuel Cortes to become General Secretary of the Transport Salaried Staffs' Association (TSSA), a trade union focused on transport and travel in the United Kingdom and Ireland, being elected with 47% of the vote. Cortes had previously left the TSSA pending an investigation into harassment. It was reported that Eslamdoust was both the first woman, and the first person of colour, to be leader of the union through its 126-year history. While representing the TSSA she has advocated for the keeping open of ticket offices in rail stations, a goal which is partly personal to achieve continued independent living for her blind and autistic brother.

== Personal life ==
Eslamdoust met her husband, Thomas Gardiner, while studying at the School of Oriental and African Studies in London. Gardiner similarly served as a Labour councillor for the Kilburn ward from 2010. Eslamdoust's son Xerxes was born in 2019, during her tenure as Mayor of Camden.

Trade union offices
Preceded by Manuel Cortes	General Secretary of the Transport Salaried Staffs' Association; 2023–present	Succeeded by Incumbent
