= Bill Webber (trade unionist) =

Welsh trade unionist

William James Percival Webber (11 September 1901 – 12 April 1982) was a Welsh trade unionist.

Born in Swansea, Webber attended Swansea Grammar School, leaving at the age of sixteen to work as a clerk for the Great Western Railway. He also joined the Railway Clerks' Association (RCA), and became active in the Labour Party.

In 1932, Webber was elected to Swansea Borough Council, and was the deputy mayor in 1942/43. From 1940, he was chairman of the National Joint Council for Local Authorities Clerical, Administrative, Professional and Technical Grades. In 1944, he stood down from the council when he became a full-time divisional secretary for the RCA.

Webber was elected as assistant general secretary of the RCA in 1949, and that year also won election to the Labour Party's National Executive Committee, serving until 1953. That year, he was elected as general secretary of the renamed Transport Salaried Staffs' Association (TSSA), and also to the General Council of the Trades Union Congress (TUC).

From 1954, Webber was a visiting fellow at Nuffield College, Oxford. In 1958, he was appointed to the Coal Board, and in 1961 to the Royal Commission on the Press. In 1962, he retired from all his posts except the Coal Board, of which he became a full-time member until retiring in 1967. He was knighted the following year.

Trade union offices
Preceded by George Thorneycroft	General Secretary of the Transport Salaried Staffs' Association; 1953–1962	Succeeded by John Bothwell
Preceded by Jim Baty, Jim Figgins and George Thorneycroft	Railways representative on the General Council of the Trades Union Congress; 1953–1963; With: Jim Baty (1953–1955); Jim Campbell (1953–1957); Albert Hallworth (1955–1960); Sidney Greene (1957–1963); William Evans (1960–1963)	Succeeded by John Bothwell, Sidney Greene and Albert Griffiths
Preceded by Frank Cousins and Frederick Hayday	Trades Union Congress representative to the AFL–CIO; 1961; With: Claude Bartlett	Succeeded by Harry Douglass and Anne Godwin
