= Percy Heady =

British trade union official

Percy T. Heady (1889 – 21 July 1966) was a British trade union official who briefly led his union, and also served on the National Executive Committee of the Labour Party.

Heady worked as a railway clerk, and joined the Railway Clerks' Association (RCA) in 1908. In 1910, he began working full-time for the union, being promoted to line secretary in 1935, and assistant general secretary in 1945.

Heady led the formation of the Watford Trades Council, becoming its secretary, and then led the formation of the Hertfordshire Federation of Trades Councils. He also served as secretary of the Watford Constituency Labour Party, and in 1945, he was elected to the National Executive Committee of the Labour Party.

In 1947, Charles Gallie, General Secretary of the RCA, retired. As he was only two years from his own retirement, Heady decided against standing in the election to replace Gallie, which was won by Fred Bostock. However, early in 1948, Bostock became ill, and Heady covered his duties. Bostock died in July, and Heady was appointed as acting general secretary, serving until his own retirement in 1949.

In 1953, Heady served on the Chambers Committee on London Transport. Two years later, he was appointed as a member of the board of the London Midland Region of British Railways, and then later served on the Western Region of British Railways board.

Trade union offices
Preceded by ?	Assistant General Secretary of the Railway Clerks' Association; 1945–1948	Succeeded by George Thorneycroft
Preceded by Fred Bostock	Acting General Secretary of the Railway Clerks' Association; 1948–1949	Succeeded by George Thorneycroft
