= Alliance for Finance =

British trade union federation

- Founded: 1996
- Headquarters: Cheltenham, England
- Location: United Kingdom
- Members: approx. 200,000
- Key people: Nick Caton, Chair; Kevin Watts, Secretary
- Website: www.alliance4finance.org

The Alliance for Finance is a trade union federation in the United Kingdom.

The Alliance for Finance was founded in 1996 on the initiative of the Barclays Group Staff Union to encourage more joint campaigning and solidarity between the many trade unions and staff associations covering the banking and financial services sector in the UK. In particular, it was felt desirable to organise joint campaigns on training and mergers. Previously, finance sector unions had a limited amount of co-operation through the Financial Services Staff Federation and Finance Sector Unions; these confederations took a back seat to the new Alliance.

The Alliance's membership was initially 27 organisations, including the Banking, Insurance and Finance Union, the Communication Workers Union, Manufacturing, Science and Finance, the Transport and General Workers' Union and USDAW. This quickly rose to 36 organisations, although the 1999 merger between the Banking Insurance and Finance Union, UNiFI and the NatWest Staff Association began a process of consolidation, which has tended to reduce its prominence. In addition, many members have affiliated to the Trades Union Congress.

Previous Secretaries of the Alliance for Finance have included Digby Jacks and Gwyn Bates former National Secretary of Unifi, Amicus and Unite the Union.

Honorary Vice Presidents of the Alliance for Finance have included Baroness Turner of Camden and current Honorary Vice President Frank Needham former General Secretary of the in house union at National & Provincial Building Society (NAPSA). Needham was Chair of the Federation of Building Society Staff Associations from 1984 to 1987 and subsequently Vice Chair of the Financial Services Staff Federation from 1993 to 1996.

== Current members ==
- ABRDN Staff Forum
- Accord
- AEGIS
- Advance
- Communication Workers Union
- Leeds Building Society Staff Association
- Nationwide Group Staff Union
- Community Union
- Phoenix Colleague Representation Forum
- Vivo
