= Leif Mills =

British trade unionist (1936–2020)

Leif Anthony Mills CBE (25 March 1936 – 17 December 2020) was a British trade unionist.

Mills was educated at Kingston Grammar School and went on to study at Balliol College, Oxford before undertaking national service in the Royal Military Police. He then joined the National Union of Bank Employees (later renamed the Banking Insurance and Finance Union - BIFU), becoming Assistant General Secretary in 1962, then Deputy General Secretary in 1968, and finally General Secretary in 1972, serving until 1996.

Mills stood unsuccessfully for the Labour Party in Salisbury at the 1964 general election, and again in a 1965 by-election. Although his first speech to the Trades Union Congress was followed by BIFU's expulsion, for registering under the Industrial Relations Act, he subsequently held a number of TUC posts, including that of President in 1994/5. He also served on the Monopolies and Mergers Commission, and more recently with the Covent Garden Market Authority.

In 1999, Mills published a biography of Frank Wild, while his Men of Ice appeared in 2008.

He was appointed CBE in the 1995 Birthday Honours.

He died on 17 December 2020 at the age of 84, and was an active member and benefactor of Weybridge Rowing Club, before which Oxford University Boat Club. He also subscribed to the Oxford and Cambridge Club.

Trade union offices
Preceded by Alfred Brooks	General Secretary of the Banking Insurance and Finance Union; 1972–1996	Succeeded by Ed Sweeney
Preceded by Jimmy Knapp	President of the Trades Union Congress; 1995	Succeeded by Margaret Prosser
