= Russell Tuck =

British trade unionist

Russell Tuck was a British trade unionist, who was second-in-command of one of the country's largest unions and also sat on the executive of the Labour Party.

Tuck began working on the railways at the age of seventeen and was for a long time based in the signalbox at Rhondda Cutting, near Pontypridd. He joined the National Union of Railwaymen (NUR) and in his spare time studied economics and politics. Two of the other local signalbox operators, Joe Champion and D. T. Jones, were also very involved in NUR matters, and both later became Labour Party parliamentarians.

In 1970, Tuck was elected as an assistant general secretary of the NUR and, in 1975, he was promoted to become senior assistant general secretary. From then until his retirement, in 1983, he also represented the union on the National Executive Committee of the Labour Party.

Trade union offices
Preceded by Sid Weighell	Assistant General Secretary of the National Union of Railwaymen; 1970–1974; With: Frank Cannon	Succeeded by Frank Cannon and Charles Turnock
Preceded by Sid Weighell	Senior Assistant General Secretary of the National Union of Railwaymen; 1975–1983	Succeeded by Charles Turnock
