= Make It Happen (Nizlopi album) =

Studio album by Nizlopi
- Released: 31 March 2008
- Recorded: FDM Recording Studios, Leamington Spa. UK
- Genre: Pop/Hip-hop/Folk
- Length: 43:33
- Label: Unknown Label
- Producer: Gavin Monaghan

Nizlopi chronology
| ExtraOrdinary (2006) | Make It Happen (2008) |

'Make It Happen' is the second full-length album released by the band Nizlopi in March 2008, following an EP released 2 years previously. The album was preceded by the single "Start Beginning".

== Track listing ==
1. Tape Spooling
2. Start Beginning (featuring IDMC Choir)
3. I'm Alive
4. Find Me
5. Feel Inside
6. Last Night in Dakar
7. Drop Your Guard
8. The One
9. Part of Me
10. Without You
11. England UpRise (featuring Ben Zephaniah)
12. Love Is
13. Flooded Quarry (featuring Rory McLeod)
14. If You Care About It
15. Lay Down
