= Rory Murphy =

British trade union leader

- Born: January 1, 1969 (age 57)
- Occupation: Trade unionist
- Years active: 1990s–2005
- Employer(s): NWSA, UNIFI, Amicus
- Known for: Merger leadership forming UNIFI; Assistant General Secretary of Amicus

Rory Murphy (born 23 April 1955) is a former British trade union leader.

Murphy attended the Bishop Bright Grammar School in Royal Leamington Spa before becoming a photographer for the Pitt Rivers Museum in 1972. He joined the Association of Scientific, Technical and Managerial Staffs (ASTMS), and from 1979 worked full-time for the union. In 1984, he became ASTMS's National Secretary for Ireland, then in 1987 was appointed as one of the union's assistant general secretaries. The union became part of Manufacturing, Science and Finance the following year, and Murphy took the same job with the new union, but in 1989 left to become the Chief Executive of Finers.

In 1990, Murphy returned to trade unionism as Director of Industrial Relations for the Royal College of Midwives, then in 1995 he was appointed as General Secretary of the NatWest Staff Association (NWSA). This was the first time that the NWSA had appointed an experienced trade unionist, rather than an employee of NatWest.

Murphy took the NWSA into a merger, in 1999, which formed UNIFI, of which he served as joint general secretary. In this role, he promoted the idea of unions offering a wide range of services to both members and non-members. In 2004, UNIFI merged into Amicus, and Murphy was appointed as one of its assistant general secretaries.

Murphy left trade unionism in 2005, initially working for an outsourcing consultancy. At the time, he stated that "unions have effectively won the battle. All the things they were fighting for – equality, lifelong learning, rights for part-timers – are well on their way to becoming a reality. If trade unions had a relevance, people would join them. But the world has moved on and unions have not." He subsequently worked for a variety of private sector organisations.

Trade union offices
| Preceded by Bob Carthy | General Secretary of the NatWest Staff Association; 1995 – 1999 | Succeeded by Position abolished |
| Preceded by New position | General Secretary of UNIFI; 1999 – 2004; With: Ed Sweeney | Succeeded by Position abolished |
