= Charles Bassett-Vincent =

British trade unionist

Charles Bassett-Vincent (c. 1837 – 3 September 1912) was a British trade unionist.

Bassett-Vincent worked as a messenger for the Railway Clearing House during the late 1850s. In 1859, he proposed that railway clerks working there undertake industrial action. This gained him prominence, and in 1865 he founded the Railway Working Men's Provident Benefit Society, the first attempt to create a trade union open to all railway workers. However, the society struggled, and it collapsed in 1867. Despite this, Michael Thomas Bass, Liberal Party Member of Parliament for Derby believed that Bassett-Vincent had great potential, and funded a speaking tour him, during which he supported the formation of a new union for railway workers.

The union was formed as the Amalgamated Society of Railway Servants (ASRS), and Bassett-Vincent described himself as its founder, although initially he served it only as editor of its newspaper, a venture also supported by Bass. He stood in the 1874 election to become general secretary of the union, taking 1,466 votes. This placed him third, behind the winner, Fred W. Evans, and the previous incumbent, George Chapman. He soon moved to become a district secretary for the union, but in 1876 he resigned to become the agent for an orphanage which the union had set up in Derby. His resignation became bitter when the union queried his finances and, in response, he refused to return some books which belonged to the ASRS.

Despite this controversy, Bassett-Vincent remained on good terms with some ASRS members. Given that the union had been unable to recruit significant numbers of railway clerks, it gave its blessing to his attempt to found a new union to represent them. By 1897, he was living in Sheffield, and so he worked with Charles Hobson, president of the Sheffield Trades Council, to form the National Association of General Railway Clerks. In order to publicise the new union, initially very small, he wrote weekly reports for the Railway Herald, and travelled the country addressing meetings.

The union held its first conference in May 1898. At the event, it was discovered that, while Bassett-Vincent claimed that the union had more than 1,000 members, only 297 people had actually paid for membership. Bassett-Vincent's requests that his position become a paid post also generated ill feeling, given that the union's finances were found to be in a poor state. While some delegates defended his ability to recruit members, the conference voted to dismiss him from the position of general secretary, with a one-off payment of £5 in acknowledgement of the personal expenses which he had incurred. Bassett-Vincent decided not to defend himself, but instead to form his own, rival union of railway clerks, but it soon became apparent that he did not have enough supporters to do so.

Bassett-Vincent later moved to Buxton, where he died in 1912.

Trade union offices
Preceded by New position	General Secretary of the National Association of General Railway Clerks; 1897–1898	Succeeded by John Hereford
