= Inverness High School =

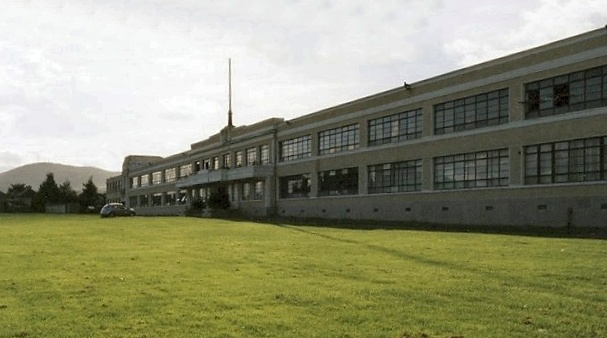
- View in September 2007

Location
- Montague Row; Dalneigh, Inverness, Highland, IV3 5DZ; Scotland
- Coordinates: 57°28′34″N 4°14′10″W

Information
- Type: State comprehensive
- Established: 1878
- Local authority: Highland
- Rector: Vikki Forrester
- Enrolment: 450
- Website: Archive

Inverness High School is a secondary school on Montague Row in Inverness, Scotland.

== Admissions ==
From a peak of over 1,600 pupils, the school's current roll is around 450. Its feeders are Central, Dalneigh, Bishop Eden's, St Joseph's and Merkinch Primary Schools. It is situated west of the river and west of Kenneth Street (A82).

In 2005, it became one of the first twenty eight schools in Scotland to be awarded Schools of Ambition status.

The current Rector at Inverness High School is Vikki Forrester. Ritchie Cunningham, who retired after 23 and a half years as Rector in April 2014, held the title of longest serving Rector in the Highlands.

== History ==
After occupying various sites around the city, it moved to its current location, in Dalneigh, in 1937. At that time, it was renamed the Technical High School and specialised in providing vocational courses. It kept this name until 1959 when it adopted its current name. In 2008, a fire started in the Assembly Hall at night, causing a temporary closure to the school.

== Notable former pupils ==
- Mike Edwards Inverness journalist, author and soldier
- David Mackenzie, General Secretary of the Transport Salaried Staffs' Association
- Ali Smith, author and Booker Prize nominee
- David Stewart, Labour MP for Inverness East, Nairn and Lochaber 1997-2005
- Gary Cornish, Scottish Heavyweight Boxer.

== See also ==
- Inverness Royal Academy
