= Ed Sweeney (trade unionist) =

British trade union leader

Edward Sweeney (born 6 August 1954) is a former British trade union leader.

Sweeney grew up in Kirkby in Lancashire (now Merseyside), where he attended St Kevin's Roman Catholic Comprehensive School (became All Saints Catholic High School, Kirkby). He completed a degree in politics and law at the University of Warwick, and a master's degree in industrial relations and labour law at the London School of Economics.

On graduation, Sweeney found work as a Research Officer with the National Union of Bank Employees. This was renamed as the Banking Insurance Finance Union (BIFU), and Sweeney was elected as its Deputy General Secretary in 1991, then as General Secretary in 1996. In 1999, he took it into a merger which formed UNIFI, and he won an election to become the new union's general secretary in 2000. He negotiated a further merger which made the union part of Amicus, and became its Deputy General Secretary.

Sweeney was also active in the Trades Union Congress (TUC), serving on its General Council and Executive Committee.

In 2007, Sweeney became Chair of the Advisory, Conciliation and Arbitration Service, standing down from his trade union posts. He also took up a visiting professorship at the University of Leeds. He retired in 2013, and was made a Commander of the Order of the British Empire.

Trade union offices
Preceded by Leif Mills	General Secretary of the Banking, Insurance and Finance Union; 1996 – 1999	Succeeded by Position abolished
Preceded by New position	General Secretary of UNIFI; 1999 – 2004; With: Rory Murphy	Succeeded by Position abolished
Preceded by Lucy Anderson	Deputy General Secretary of Amicus; 2004 – 2007; With: Lucy Anderson (2004 – 2005); Tony Dubbins (2005 – 2007); Graham Goddard (2006 – 2007)	Succeeded by Position abolished
Non-profit organization positions
Preceded by Rita Donaghy	Chair of Acas; 2007 – 2013	Succeeded by Brendan Barber
