= Albert Hallworth =

British trade unionist

Albert Hallworth (5 January 1898 – 18 April 1962) was a British trade unionist.

Hallworth grew up in Stockport, and worked in a cotton mill from an early age. In 1914, aged 16, he joined the Royal Fusiliers as a drummer and served throughout World War I. He was demobbed in 1919, and began working for the London, Midland and Scottish Railway as an engine cleaner. He was subsequently promoted to become a fireman, then a spare driver, and joined the Associated Society of Locomotive Engineers and Firemen (ASLEF).

Hallworth began working full-time for ASLEF in 1938, when he became an organising secretary, then in 1948 he was promoted to become acting assistant general secretary. In 1955, he helped organise a major railway strike, and that year also won a seat on the General Council of the Trades Union Congress. The following year, he was elected as general secretary of the union, serving until 1960.

Trade union offices
| Preceded by Jim Baty and Percy Collick | Acting Assistant General Secretary of the Associated Society of Locomotive Engineers and Firemen; 1948–1955; With: Percy Collick | Succeeded by William Evans |
| Preceded by Jim Baty | General Secretary of the Associated Society of Locomotive Engineers and Firemen; 1956–1960 | Succeeded by William Evans |
| Preceded by Jim Baty, Jim Campbell and Bill Webber | Railways representative on the General Council of the Trades Union Congress; 1955–1960; With: Bill Webber; Jim Campbell (1955–1957); Sidney Greene (1957–1960) | Succeeded by William Evans, Sidney Greene and Bill Webber |
