= Will Ballantine =

British trade unionist and socialist activist

William Ballantine (1900 –) was a Scottish fireman, trade unionist and socialist activist.

Ballantine was born in Edinburgh and was educated in Lanarkshire. He worked on farms before and after school from an early age. He left school at the age of twelve, and began doing farm work full-time. He eventually left to work on the railways, becoming an engine cleaner at Carstairs Junction, and joined the National Union of Railwaymen. He later worked as a railway fireman.

Ballantine joined the Independent Labour Party, and remained loyal to it after it split from the Labour Party in 1932. He was due to stand in local elections in Perth for the ILP, but brokered a deal with the Labour Party that he would withdraw in their favour. Although this was criticised by some party members, it achieved a longer-term influence for the ILP locally. By 1939, he was one of the most prominent trade unionists in the party, and he was elected to its National Administrative Committee, serving until 1950. He stood for the party in Bradford East at the 1945 UK general election, taking third place, with 14.6% of the votes cast.

In line with ILP policy, Ballantine opposed British involvement in World War II. He was the chair of the No Conscription Fellowship founded in 1939, although he was not a pacifist, and accepted the need for socialist opposition to Nazism.

Ballantine was elected to the NUR's executive in 1937, representing the Locomotive Group, Area No.1. In 1946, he began working full-time for the NUR as an organiser, and in 1958 he became an assistant general secretary of the union. He retired in 1965 and was named to the Western Railway Board of British Railways for 1966.

Trade union offices
| Preceded by Frederick E. Bell | Assistant General Secretary of the National Union of Railwaymen; 1958–1965 | Succeeded by Sidney Weighell |
