= Gerry Doherty =

British trade unionist (1953–2023)

Gerard Doherty (1953 – 3 September 2023) was a British trade unionist.

Based in Glasgow, Doherty worked for British Rail, and joined the Transport Salaried Staffs' Association (TSSA) in 1972. He soon became chairman of his branch of the union, and then became secretary of its Glasgow and West of Scotland Political Advisory Council. In 1988, he was elected to the union's executive committee, and then in 1991 he began working full-time for the union as its Irish secretary.

In 1995, Doherty returned to the UK as a divisional secretary for the union, working at its headquarters in London. He was elected as general secretary of the TSSA in 2004, pledging to keep it affiliated to the Labour Party and use those links to campaign on the ownership and integration of railways in the UK. He was also elected to the General Council of the Trades Union Congress.

Under Doherty's leadership, the TSSA entered into merger talks with the National Union of Rail, Maritime and Transport Workers, and Doherty took early retirement in 2011 in the hope of facilitating these.

In retirement, Doherty served as a director of South Central Youth, a charity aiming to dissuade young people in South London from joining gangs. In 2018, he was appointed a trustee of the Railways Pension Scheme, on the nomination of the TSSA.

In 2019 Doherty undertook a controversial report into industrial relations at Brighton and Hove City Council's Cityclean service, which was commissioned as part of the settlement terms after a ballot by the GMB in 2019 threatened an all-out strike over the weekend of Brighton Pride. Brighton and Hove City Council paid £44,100 for the report, which was discussed in a private council meeting in December 2019 and has never been made public. Some content of the report was revealed in the 2023 Aileen McColgan KC report into service issues, a report which reiterated and validated observations made by Doherty in his 2019 report.

Gerry Doherty died on 3 September 2023, at the age of 70.

Trade union offices
| Preceded by Richard Rosser | General Secretary of the Transport Salaried Staffs' Association; 2004–2011 | Succeeded by Manuel Cortes |
