= Ray Buckton =

British trade unionist (1922-1995)

Raymond William Buckton (20 October 1922 – 7 May 1995) was general secretary of ASLEF, the rail drivers' trade union in Great Britain.

== Early life ==
He was born in Rillington, then in the East Riding of Yorkshire, now in North Yorkshire. His father was a farm worker on a large estate, who became a member of the Junior Imperial and Constitutional League (later the Young Conservatives).

He was the eldest of seven children, attending Appleton Roebuck Elementary School.

== Career ==
He left school at 14 to work as a groundsman on a local country estate. He started as an engine cleaner on the York to Scarborough Line aged 16.

=== York City Council ===
He became the Labour Leader of York council at the age of 24.

=== ASLEF ===
In 1940 he became active in ASLEF, and joined the League of Youth. He became a full-time ASLEF worker in 1960, working in the North-East, becoming Assistant General Secretary in 1963, based in Hampstead.

During his time as leader of ASLEF in January 1982 he received death threats, and unsightly items pushed through his letterbox. His car was once doused with red paint, including the windows. He also served on the TUC General Council from 1973 to 1986.

=== Special Branch informer ===
It was alleged in 2002 by Ken Day, a former Metropolitan Police Special Branch officer, that Ray Buckton was a Special Branch informer who had regularly passed information to the Special Branch industrial division. This information was aired as part of the BBC2 series, True Spies.

== Personal life ==
He married Barbara Langfield (a train driver's daughter - Ray was his fireman) in 1954 in York. Ray had helped organise her father's funeral. They lived in Edgware, a house owned by the union, and owned a cottage in Essex. They had two sons (including a son born in 1958). His wife worked at the ASTMS union.

He died of cancer in Portugal aged 72. He had lived in Portugal (Albufeira) for seven years. When he died ASLEF membership was around 16,000; when he joined it was around 77,000.

Trade union offices
| Preceded by Albert Griffiths | Assistant General Secretary of ASLEF; 1963–1970 | Succeeded by Don Pullen |
| Preceded by Albert Griffiths | General Secretary of ASLEF; 1970–1987 | Succeeded by Neil Milligan |
| Preceded by Percy Coldrick and Sidney Greene | Railways representative on the General Council of the Trades Union Congress; 1972–1983; With: Sidney Greene (1972–1975); Sidney Weighell (1975–1983) | Succeeded by Council reorganised |
| Preceded by Frank Chapple | President of the Trades Union Congress; 1984 | Succeeded by Jack Eccles |
