= Tom Hollywood =

Tom Hollywood (1902 – 7 November 1957) was a British trade unionist.

Born in Barrow-in-Furness, Hollywood became a cleaner at the Glasgow St Rollox railway depot in 1916, then became an engine driver. He joined the Associated Society of Locomotive Engineers and Firemen (ASLEF), and by the age of eighteen was branch chair. In 1924, Hollywood left ASLEF and joined the rival National Union of Railwaymen (NUR). He served on its executive committee for two separate periods of three years. In 1956, he was elected as President of the NUR.

Hollywood was a supporter of the Labour Party. From 1943, he served on the executive of the Scottish Labour Party, and he chaired Scottish Labour in 1952. In 1957, he was elected to the National Executive Committee of the Labour Party.

In November 1957, Hollywood travelled to the Soviet Union with the union's general secretary, Jim Campbell, and four other union representatives. They were involved in a car accident while in Stalingrad, in which Campbell was killed and Hollywood seriously injured. He died the following day, without regaining consciousness.

Trade union offices
Preceded by Jim Stafford	President of the National Union of Railwaymen; 1957	Succeeded by Charles W. Evans
Party political offices
Preceded by Margaret Hyde	Chair of the Scottish Labour Party; 1952	Succeeded by John Lang
