= Percy Collick =

British politician and trade union official

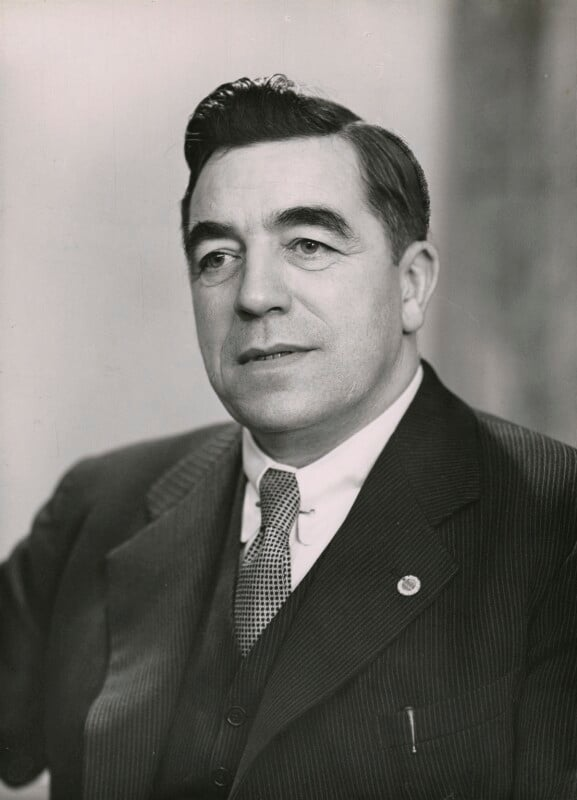
- Collick in 1950

Member of Parliament
- In office 5 July 1945 – 25 September 1964
- Preceded by: John Sandeman Allen
- Succeeded by: Edmund Dell
- Constituency: Birkenhead West (1945–1950); Birkenhead (1950–1964)

Personal details
- Born: 16 November 1897 Guildford, England
- Died: 24 July 1984 (aged 86) London, England
- Party: Labour
- Profession: Railway fireman; trade unionist

Percy Henry Collick (16 November 1897 – 24 July 1984) was a British Labour Party politician and trade union official. He was the Member of Parliament (MP) for Birkenhead West from 1945 to 1950, when the seat was abolished in boundary changes, and then for Birkenhead from 1950 to 1964.

== Background ==
Born in Guildford in 1897, Collick was a railway fireman with the Southern Railway. He was a member of the Associated Society of Locomotive Engineers and Firemen, serving as organising secretary from 1934 to 1940 and assistant general secretary from 1940 to his retirement in 1957.

== Career ==
He was an unsuccessful candidate at the 1929 general election in the safe Conservative constituency of Reigate in Surrey, coming third with 20.9% of the votes. He stood again in Reigate at the 1931 general election, when there was no Liberal candidate, and he came second with only 17.3% of the vote, a Conservative majority of over 65%. He did not contest the 1935 general election.

In the Labour landslide at the 1945 general election, he was elected as Member of Parliament for the Merseyside constituency of Birkenhead West, overturning the previous Conservative majority of 3,753 with a swing of 13.2%.

His constituency was abolished in boundary changes for the 1950 general election, and he was returned for the new Birkenhead constituency. He held the seat until he retired from the House of Commons at the 1964 general election.

In Clement Attlee's post-war Labour government, he served as Parliamentary Secretary to the Ministry of Agriculture and Fisheries from 1945 to 1947, but resigned due to an illness.

== Personal life ==
Collick married in 1948. He died in London on 24 July 1984, aged 86.

Parliament of the United Kingdom
Preceded by John Sandeman Allen	Member of Parliament for Birkenhead West; 1945–1950	Constituency abolished
New constituency	Member of Parliament for Birkenhead; 1950–1964	Succeeded by Edmund Dell
Trade union offices
Preceded by William P. Allen	Assistant General Secretary of the Associated Society of Locomotive Engineers and Firemen; 1939–1955; With: Jim Baty (1946–1948); Albert Hallworth (1948–1955)	Succeeded by William Evans
