= John Bothwell (trade unionist) =

British trade union leader

John Gibb Bothwell OBE (1909 or 1910 – 1994) was a British trade union leader.

Bothwell became a junior clerk with the London and North Eastern Railway when he was sixteen years old. He joined the Railway Clerks' Association, and from 1939 began working full-time in its Scottish office. In 1950, he was appointed as the Scottish secretary of the union. He became active in the Scottish Trades Union Congress, and served as its president in 1954. In 1956, he was made an Officer of the Order of the British Empire.

In 1960, Bothwell was elected as assistant general secretary of the union, by now renamed as the Transport Salaried Staffs' Association (TSSA). He became general secretary in 1963, and was also elected to the General Council of the Trades Union Congress, and in 1965 to the general council of the International Transport Workers' Federation. He retired from his trade union posts in 1968, due to poor health. However, he remained active as a member of the Industrial Arbitration Board, for which work he was made a Commander of the Order of the British Empire.

Trade union offices
Preceded by Archibald MacKellar	President of the Scottish Trades Union Congress; 1954–1955	Succeeded by Thomas B. Meikle
Preceded by Bill Webber	General Secretary of the Transport Salaried Staffs' Association; 1963–1968	Succeeded by Percy Coldrick
Preceded by William Evans, Sidney Greene and Bill Webber	Railways representative on the General Council of the Trades Union Congress; 1963–1968; With: Sidney Greene; Albert Griffiths	Succeeded by Percy Coldrick, Sidney Greene and Albert Griffiths
