= Rita Donaghy, Baroness Donaghy =

Labour politician and life peer

The Right Honourable The Baroness Donaghy CBE
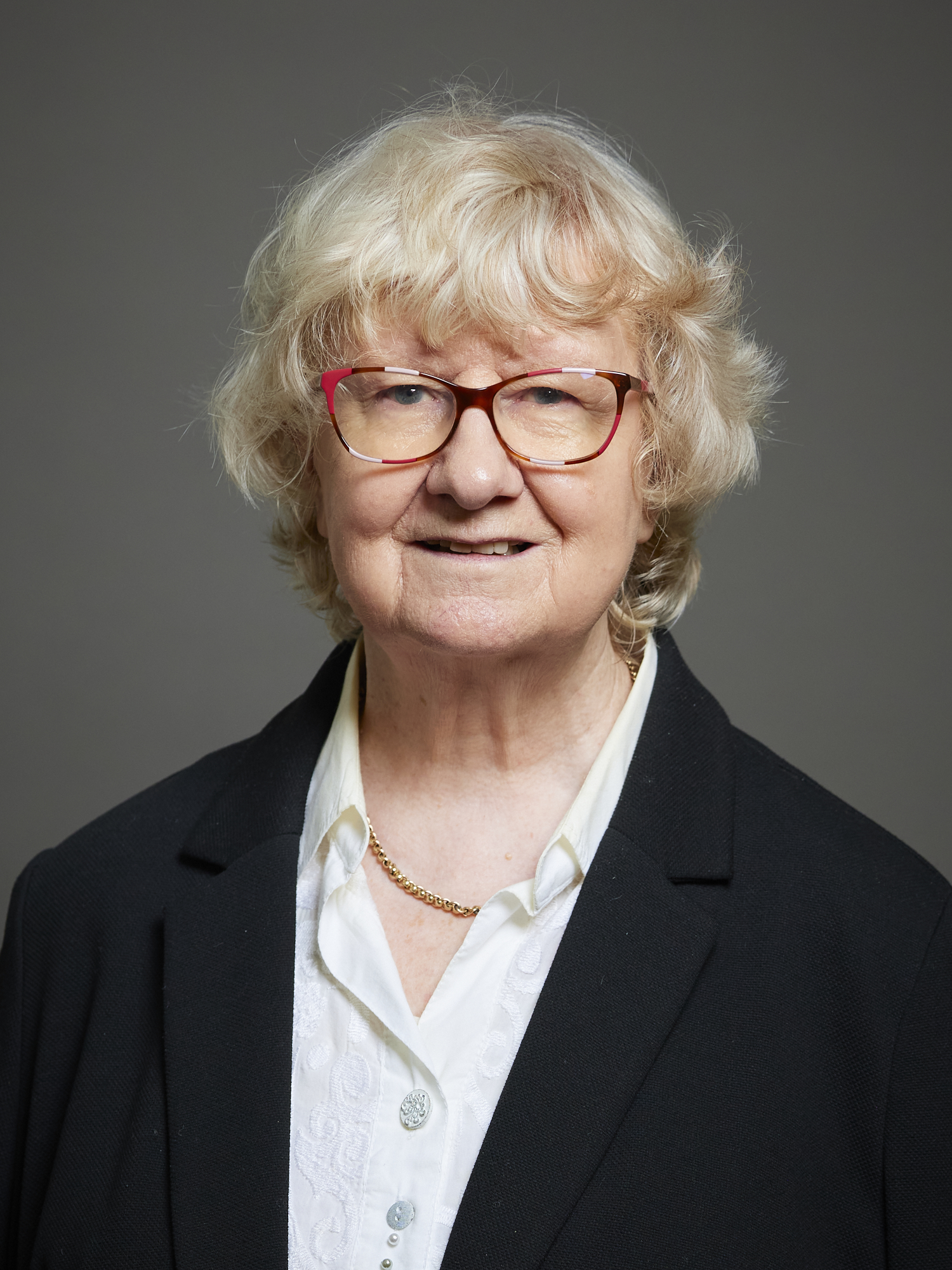
- Donaghy in 2024

Member of the House of Lords
- Lord Temporal
- Life peerage 26 June 2010

Personal details
- Born: Rita Margaret Donaghy; 9 October 1944 (age 82)
- Party: Labour
- Education: Durham University

Rita Margaret Donaghy, Baroness Donaghy, CBE, FRSA (born 9 October 1944) is a British university administrator, trade unionist and Labour life peer in the House of Lords.

Donaghy graduated from the University of Durham. She worked at the Institute of Education, University of London, as an Assistant Registrar and later as Permanent Secretary to the Students' Union. She became active in the trade union NALGO, becoming a member of its National Executive by 1973 and serving as President for 1989/90. She was a member of the General Council of the Trades Union Congress from 1989 - representing NALGO, which merged to become UNISON in 1993 - and was made TUC President in 2000.

In October 2000 she left her trade union positions on being appointed as Chair of the industrial conciliation service ACAS, a post she held until 2007. She served on the Committee on Standards in Public Life (Nolan Committee) from 2001 until 2007, briefly as Chair after Sir Alistair Graham's three-year term ended.

She was a member of the Low Pay Commission and the Employment Tribunal Taskforce and chaired the TUC Disabilities Forum. In 2009, Donaghy was invited to chair an enquiry into work-related deaths in the construction industry, whose report published in 2010 contained many recommendations for improving safety in the industry.

She is Chair of the Diffuse Mesothelioma Oversight Committee and a member of the Birmingham University Business Advisory Group.

== Honours ==
Donaghy was awarded the OBE in 1998 for services to industrial relations, and CBE in 2005 for services to employment relations. She has Honorary Doctorates from the Open University (2003), Keele University (2004) and the University of Greenwich (2005). In 2003 she was awarded a Fellowship of the Chartered Institute of Personnel and Development, followed in 2004 by Fellowship of the Royal Society of Arts (FRSA).

Her life peerage was announced in the 2010 Dissolution Honours List. She was created Baroness Donaghy, of Peckham in the London Borough of Southwark, on 26 June 2010.

Trade union offices
Preceded by Peter Hagger	Chair of the Trades Councils' Joint Consultative Committee; 1995–1999	Succeeded by Jimmy Knapp
Preceded by Hector MacKenzie	President of the Trades Union Congress; 2000	Succeeded by Bill Morris
Non-profit organization positions
Preceded by John Hougham	Chair of Acas; 2000–2007	Succeeded by Ed Sweeney
