= Half These Songs Are About You =

Studio album by Nizlopi
- Released: 16 August 2004
- Recorded: FDM Recording, Leamington Spa, UK
- Genre: Pop, hip hop, folk
- Length: 43:33
- Label: FDM Records
- Producer: Gavin Monaghan

Nizlopi chronology
Half These Songs Are About You (2004)	ExtraOrdinary (2006)

Professional ratings
Review scores
Source	Rating
The Cornish Times	8/10 link
Independent on Sunday	2/5 link
Maverick	3/5 link

Half These Songs Are About You is the first album released by the band Nizlopi in August 2004. It includes the number one single, "JCB". Despite the duo nature of Nizlopi, this album is largely populated by full band tracks with real drums (instead of John Parker's human beatbox) and many other instruments. The songs therefore sound quite different live.

== Track listing ==
1. "Fine Story" – 3:35
2. "Girls" – 3:55
3. "Call It Up" – 3:36
4. "Faith" – 3:03
5. "Long Distance" – 3:37
6. "JCB" – 3:47
7. "Love Rage On" – 3:13
8. "Freedom" – 4:12
9. "Wash Away" – 3:50
10. "Sing Around It" – 4:21
11. "Worry" – 6:24

There is also a hidden track, "Intro Song", after "Worry".

== Credits ==
Allsongs written by Nizlopi.

- Produced by Gavin Monaghan.
- Executive producer Kieron Concannon
- Engineered by Andy Taylor
- Mastered by John Dent
- Luke Concannon: Vocals, acoustic guitar, skull shaker
- John Parker: double bass, beat box, electric guitars, banjo
- Matt Klose: drums
- Hugh Graham: Percussion
- Gavin Monaghan: Hammond organ, Piano
- Fergusito Paton: flamenco guitar, Spanish shouting
- Tom Bailey: Piano
- Kieron Concannon: Uilleann pipes, low whistles
- Carina Round: harmony vocals
- Laurie Miller: Backing vocals
- Enigma string quartet
- Horn section

== Charts ==
Chart performance for Half These Songs Are About You
Chart (2005)	Peak position
UK Albums (OCC)	88
UK Independent Albums (OCC)	7
UK R&B Albums (OCC)	20

== Certifications ==
Certifications for Half These Songs Are About You
Region	Certification	Certified units/sales
United Kingdom (BPI)	Silver	60,000^{‡}
^{‡} Sales+streaming figures based on certification alone.
