= Sidney Weighell =

British trade unionist (1922–2002)

Sidney Weighell (31 March 1922 – 13 February 2002) was an English footballer, trade unionist and the General Secretary of the National Union of Railwaymen from 1975 to 1983.

== Early life ==
Weighell was born on 31 March 1922, in Northallerton, to a family of the rail industry; his father was signalman Tom Weighell, his grandfather Bill was a guard and his brother Maurice was a driver. He was educated at a Church of England school, which he left at age 15 and became an apprentice mechanic.

== Railway work ==
In 1938, he took an apprenticeship at the road motor engineering department of the London and North Eastern Railway company. He became active in the National Union of Railwaymen (NUR) immediately upon starting work for the railways, believing in 'one union for all railway staff'. This brought him into conflict with the Associated Society of Locomotive Engineers and Firemen (ASLEF); Weighell was a so-called 'footplate grade', traditionally represented by ASLEF, not the NUR. Weighell considered craft unions (unions catering to a particular job within an industry rather than to the industry itself) as outmoded and elitist, and apparently said so on many occasions at the Northallerton Railwaymen's club.

In January 1940, he joined the locomotive department as a fireman, becoming a qualified engine driver in 1943. He left the railways in 1945 to become a professional footballer, but returned in 1947. In 1954, he was made a full-time divisional officer for the NUR, and moved to their headquarters in London. In 1965, he was elected Assistant General Secretary of the NUR, and his maiden speech at the Labour Party conference in 1966 was heavily critical of Frank Cousins' policies on income and pay restraint, further cementing his reputation as a "disruptive influence".

In 1969, he was named as Senior AGS, becoming Sidney Greene's deputy when the need arose, and when Greene chose to retire in 1975 Weighell won the leadership election, with more votes than all three of his opponents put together, a rare occurrence in the NUR.

Following rumours of a massive cut in rail services he threatened to stop NUR-sponsored MPs from backing any kind of bill. In 1973, he became secretary of the newly formed Transport 2000. He spoke at the 1976 Labour Party Conference, along with Johnny Johnson and Ray Buckton, talking about the deep disappointment following the party's desertion of its election manifesto.

During the 1960s, he waged a campaign against the dieselisation of the railways, arguing that the best conversion in the long-term would be electrification. He failed to convince either the National Executive or Harold Wilson, but made more progress in the 1970s with his new leverage as General Secretary, attacking Anthony Crosland's White Paper on transport integration. A stroke of luck saw Crosland moved to the foreign office in 1976 and replaced by William Rodgers, who was more receptive to comments from the NUR. The result was the Transport Act 1978, which Weighell saw as a victory.

== Politics ==
In 1945, he joined the Labour Party, becoming a delegate to the local trades council. The political views he expressed soon made him enemies and he later lost his seat on the trades council. In 1973, he was elected to the National Executive Committee of the Labour Party.

== Downfall ==
At the Labour Party conference in 1982, the NUR delegation decided to vote for the National Union of Mineworkers, led by Arthur Scargill. Weighell, however, secretly voted for the EETPU, a fact quickly discovered by conference officials.

Branded a cheat, Weighell was forced to offer his resignation, which a union conference convened in Birmingham accepted 41–36. Despite the scandal he maintained he had done the right thing, saying "I'm glad to have been a casualty if it means that the party executive does not fall into the hands of militants."

== Later life ==
After resigning in 1983 he moved back to Yorkshire and joined the British Airports Authority board, as well as acting as a consultant to Tyne Tees Television. In 1983, he wrote an autobiography titled On the Rails which was extremely scathing to both the successive and earlier General Secretaries.

== Personal life ==
On 1 September 1949, Weighell married Margaret Hunter, with whom he had one son and one daughter, Jennifer and Anthony. In 1956 Margaret and Jennifer were both killed when the family were involved in a car crash. Sidney himself spent several months in hospital, but returned to work after he had recovered. Later his only comment upon the crash was that, "Compared to it, other things didn´t seem so bad." He married a second time on 21 November 1959 to Joan Willetts, a market research interviewer, but no children resulted.

== Football ==
Weighell was a skilled footballer, and always attributed his failure of the 11-plus exams to his preference to play football rather than study. He was offered trials for Sunderland, Newcastle United and Sheffield United, and signed for Sunderland on 12 October 1945 for a fee of £10 and played for two seasons as an inside left on the second team, claiming that he was the best inside-left in the north east "except for a certain gentleman by the name of Raich Carter".

Trade union offices
Preceded by Will Ballantine	Assistant General Secretary of the National Union of Railwaymen; 1965–1969	Succeeded by Frank Cannon and Russell Tuck
Preceded by George Brassington	Senior Assistant General Secretary of the National Union of Railwaymen; 1969–1974	Succeeded by Russell Tuck
Preceded by Sidney Greene	General Secretary of the National Union of Railwaymen; 1975–1983	Succeeded by Jimmy Knapp
Preceded by Ray Buckton and Sidney Greene	Railways representative on the General Council of the Trades Union Congress; 1975–1983; With: Ray Buckton	Succeeded by Council reorganised
