= Percy Coldrick (trade unionist) =

British trade union leader

Albert Percival Coldrick OBE (6 June 1913 – 4 December 1999) was a British trade union leader.

Coldrick was born in Wigan and grew up partly in Pontypool, but back in Wigan from the age of eight. Coldrick's father, also named Percy Coldrick, was a Welsh rugby league footballer, and the family moved around as he looked for employment. He and his wife, Esther Muriel Coldrick, had three sons; Roy, Robert Peter and David.

After finishing his education, Coldrick began working for the London, Midland and Scottish Railway, initially as a messenger, then in a variety of roles, but was made redundant when he was 20 years old. He found work as a railway porter at Wigan, then as assistant controller there, and in 1946 became controller at Rowsley railway station, followed rapidly by appointment as Divisional Controller at Manchester Victoria railway station.

Coldrick had always been a supporter of trade unionism, inspired by his father forming a short-lived union for rugby players. He joined the Railway Clerks' Association, and began working for the union full-time in 1948, based in Leeds. Initially, he was given responsibility for staff not working directly on the railways - those in road haulage, waterways, railway hotels and catering. After periods as the secretary for the Western Region and the London Midland region, in 1963 he was promoted to Senior Assistant Secretary. In 1968, he was elected as general secretary of what was now known as the Transport Salaried Staffs' Association, and he was also elected to serve on the General Council of the Trades Union Congress.

Coldrick retired from his trade union posts in 1973. He became chair of a National Health Service appeal tribunal, and sat on the executive of the Industrial Participation Association.

In 1974, Coldrick was made an Officer of the Order of the British Empire. He died in 1999.

Trade union offices
Preceded by John Bothwell	General Secretary of the Transport Salaried Staffs' Association; 1968–1973	Succeeded by David Mackenzie
Preceded by JJohn Bothwell, Sidney Greene and Albert Griffiths	Railways representative on the General Council of the Trades Union Congress; 1968–1972; With: Albert Griffiths (1968–1969); Sidney Greene	Succeeded by Ray Buckton and Sidney Greene
