= David Mackenzie (trade unionist) =

Scottish trade unionist (1922–1989)

David Alexander Mackenzie (22 March 1922 – 31 December 1989) was a Scottish trade union leader.

Born in Inverness, Mackenzie was educated at Merkinch Public School and then Inverness High School. He left school at the age of fourteen and found work with the London, Midland and Scottish Railway. During World War II, he served in the Royal Navy.

Returning to the railway after the war, Mackenzie became active in the Transport Salaried Staffs' Association (TSSA). From 1952, he worked full-time for the union as a divisional secretary, and was promoted to Senior Assistant Secretary in 1966 and Assistant General Secretary in 1968. In this role, he began representing the union on various external bodies, including the Non-Manual Workers' Committee of the Trades Union Congress, the Air Transport and Travel Industry Training Board, and the Hotel and Catering Industry Training Board.

In 1973, Mackenzie was elected as General Secretary of the TSSA. He took early retirement in 1977 due to poor health, but in time his health improved, and he worked as a civil servant from 1980 until his final retirement in 1986.

Trade union offices
Preceded by Percy Coldrick	General Secretary of the Transport Salaried Staffs' Association; 1973–1977	Succeeded by Tom Jenkins
