= William Stott (trade unionist) =

British trade unionist

William Stott (16 September 1879 – 25 March 1956) was a British trade unionist.

Born in Boroughbridge, then in the West Riding of Yorkshire, Stott began working at the age of fifteen, as a goods clerk for the North Eastern Railway. In 1900, Stott was promoted to work at the District Managers' Office in York; while there, he joined the Railway Clerks' Association (RCA). His manager disapproved of this and, when Stott refused to leave the union, he was transferred to a small town.

In 1909, Stott was appointed as the full-time Assistant Secretary of the RCA, serving in this office for many years. He edited the union's Railway Service Journal for twelve years, and from 1924 headed up the union's movements department. He was secretary of two joint sectional councils: the Somerset and Dorset, and London and South West, then in 1934, became secretary of the London and North Eastern Railway council number one.

Alexander Walkden, long-term general secretary of the RCA, stood down in 1936, and Stott was elected as his replacement, also winning election to the General Council of the Trades Union Congress. However, he retired from all his posts in 1940, spending the remainder of World War II on the Advisory Council on Reserved Occupations.

Trade union offices
Preceded by Alexander Walkden	General Secretary of the Railway Clerks' Association; 1936 – 1940	Succeeded by Charles Gallie
