= Tony Tobin =

English celebrity chef

Tony Tobin is a celebrity chef who has been a regular on the BBC food show Ready Steady Cook since 1995. His other notable British TV appearances were as the presenter of the 13-part series Spice World and The Green Gourmet on the Carlton Food Channel. He has also made guest appearances on shows including BBC's Food and Drink and The Generation Game Saturday Kitchen and James Martin's Saturday Morning as well many others.

He was brought up in the Warwickshire village of Priors Marston and attended Trinity Catholic School in Leamington, before training at Stratford College. He graduated to the Grosvenor Hotel in Chester then moved on to London's Capital Hotel.

He started his TV career in 1991 with an appearance on Granada TV's This Morning before moving onto Ready Steady Cook and Can't Cook Won't Cook with guest appearances on shows such as Food and Drink and The Generation Game.

Tobin took part in a celebrity version of TV show Total Wipeout which aired on 18 September 2010.
