= Aegis the Union =

UK trade union

Aegis
- Aegis the Union
- Founded: 1971; 55 years ago
- Headquarters: Aegon UK plc; Edinburgh Park; Edinburgh EH12 9SE
- Members: ▲4,093 (2024)
- General Secretary: Brian McDaid
- Deputy General Secretary: Ania Lomax
- Affiliations: TUC; STUC; GFTU; A4F
- Website: aegistheunion.co.uk

Aegis is a trade union representing workers in financial services in the United Kingdom.

The union was founded in 1971 as the Scottish Equitable Staff Association, an internal staff association at Scottish Equitable. Scottish Equitable was renamed Aegon UK in 2010, and the union changed its name to "Aegis", affiliating to the Trades Union Congress in the same year.

By 2012, some Aegon staff had been outsourced, and the union began also recruiting those workers. This led it to pursue a strategy of gradual growth into other parts of the financial services industry. In 2014, the unions SURGE and YISA merged into Aegis, expanding the operation of the union into Skipton Building Society, Homeloan Management Limited (now known as Computershare) and Yorkshire Building Society as well.

The current General Secretary is Brian McDaid.
