= Sidney Greene, Baron Greene of Harrow Weald =

The Right Honourable The Lord Greene of Harrow Weald CBE

Member of the House of Lords
- Lord Temporal
- Life peerage 21 January 1975 – 26 July 2004

Personal details
- Born: 12 February 1910
- Died: 26 July 2004 (aged 94)

Sidney Francis Greene, Baron Greene of Harrow Weald, CBE (12 February 1910 – 26 July 2004) was a trade union leader in the United Kingdom, serving as general secretary of the National Union of Railwaymen from 1957 to 1975. He promoted close ties between the union and the Labour Party, which have not persisted with its successor National Union of Rail, Maritime and Transport Workers.

Early in his career, after leaving school at age 14, Greene was a porter at Paddington station.

Appointed a Commander of the Order of the British Empire in the 1966 New Year's Honours, he was Knighted in 1970. On 21 January 1975 he was created a life peer as Baron Greene of Harrow Weald, of Harrow in Greater London.

Trade union offices
Preceded by Jim Campbell	Assistant General Secretary of the National Union of Railwaymen; 1954–1957	Succeeded by George Brassington
Preceded by Jim Campbell	General Secretary of the National Union of Railwaymen; 1957–1975	Succeeded by Sidney Weighell
Preceded by Jim Campbell, Albert Hallworth and Bill Webber	Railways representative on the General Council of the Trades Union Congress; 1957–1975; With: Albert Hallworth (1957–1960); Bill Webber (1957–1963); William Evans (1960–1963); John Bothwell (1963–1968); Albert Griffiths (1963–1969); Percy Coldrick (1968–1972); Ray Buckton (1972–1975)	Succeeded by Ray Buckton and Sidney Weighell
Preceded by John E. Newton	President of the Trades Union Congress; 1970	Succeeded by Jack Cooper
Preceded by Jack Cooper and Harry Nicholas	Trades Union Congress representative to the AFL-CIO; 1969; With: George Smith	Succeeded by Cyril Plant and Hugh Scanlon
