= Christie Hennessy =

Irish singer-songwriter

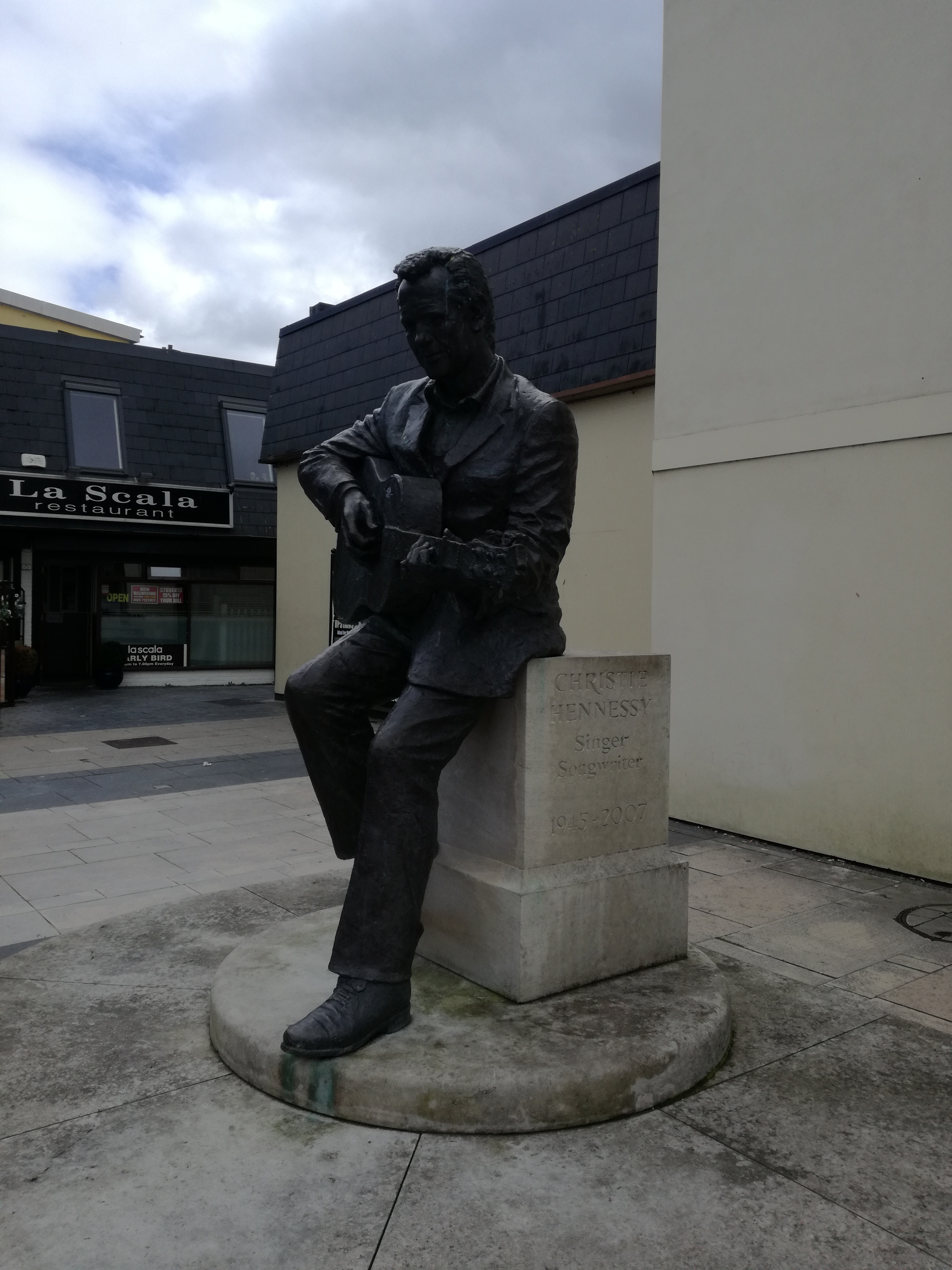
- Hennessy's statue in Tralee

Background information
- Born: Edward Christopher Ross; 19 November 1945
- Origin: Tralee, Ireland
- Died: 11 December 2007 (aged 62) London, United Kingdom
- Genres: Folk, singer-songwriter
- Occupations: Singer, songwriter, producer
- Instrument: Guitar

Christie Hennessy (born Edward Christopher Ross; 19 November 1945 – 11 December 2007) was an Irish folk singer-songwriter. Although unable to read or write due to severe dyslexia, he still wrote his own songs such as "Roll Back the Clouds" and "All the Lies That You Told Me".

== Early life ==
Hennessy was born in Tralee, County Kerry, Ireland. His first guitar was made, especially for him, from a tea chest when he was six years old by his friend Jerry Quirke. He left school at the age of eleven and a half.

His first job was as a messenger boy, and it was then that he discovered that it was important to be able to read. He was unable to read or write due to severe dyslexia, but still enjoyed his library of books. He later worked on building sites in London.

== Career ==
In 1972 he released his first record, The Green Album, on Westwood, a small label. With scant publicity or promotion, the album made little impact and only 500 copies of the record were pressed. Hennessy returned to labouring on building sites in the UK and did not release another album for twenty years.

A renowned songwriter as well as performer, Hennessy wrote several songs that became hits for other singers including Don't Forget your Shovel, made famous by Christy Moore, and All the Lies that You Told Me, recorded by Frances Black. He also composed the theme tune and incidental music for the BBC TV series "Get Well Soon" written by Ray Galton (of Steptoe & Son fame) and composed and wrote a musical/feature film about his native Ireland, Two Stops to Paradise

Hennessy returned to the studio in 2007, one final time to record an album with both Luka Bloom and Christy Moore sharing vocals on one of the tracks.

In 2005, Christy Moore's rendition of Hennessy's "Don't Forget Your Shovel" was referenced in a UK Number One single "The JCB Song" by Nizlopi: "And the engine rattles my bum like berserk. While we're singin, 'Don't forget your shovel if you want to go to work!'" It was further referenced in the video for the same song; as the line is sung, the characters in the JCB pass a shop called "Christie's Shovels".

== Death ==
Hennessy died on 11 December 2007 in a London hospice, aged 62. He was reported to have died from pleural mesothelioma, a rare form of lung cancer, which has been attributed to his younger years spent working on building sites in London where he was exposed to asbestos dust. Just before he died he had been touring in Ireland but had to cancel due to the illness. His ashes were buried in Old Rath Cemetery, Tralee. A commemorative statue of Christie was erected in Central Plaza, just off the town square in Tralee in November 2009.

== Discography ==
=== Albums ===
Year	Album details	Peak chart positions		Certifications
Year	Album details	IRE	UK	Certifications
1972	Christie Hennessy/The Green Album: Released: 1972; Label: Westwood	–	–	
1992	The Rehearsal: Released: 1992; Label: N/A	–	–	IRE: 3× Platinum
1993	A Year in the Life: Released: 1993; Label: Warner Music France	–	–	IRE: 4× Platinum
1995	Lord of Your Eyes: Released: 1995; Label: WEA	–	–	IRE: 2× Platinum
1996	The Box: Released: 1996; Label: WEA	–	–	IRE: 3× Platinum
2006	Stories for Sale: Released: 2006; Label: Mvine	–	–	
2006	This Is as Far as I Go: Released: 2006; Label: Warner Bros.	–	–	IRE: 2× Platinum
2008	The Two of Us: Released: 28 April 2008; Label: Universal Distribution	–	–	
2009	A Friend of Mine: Released: 31 October 2009 (+).; Label: N/A	–	–	
2018	The Last Goodbye: Released: 16 November 2018; Label: Universal	9	–	
"—" denotes albums that did not chart, or wasn't released in that country.
"+" denotes a posthumous release.

=== Singles ===
Year of release	Single details	Peak chart positions(Irl)
1991	Roll Back the Clouds: Label: Son; Entered Chart: 20 June 1991; Weeks in Chart: 8	4
1991	Oh Jealous Heart: Label: Record Services; Entered Chart: 10 October 1991; Weeks in Chart: 4	15
1993	If You Were to Fall: Label: WEA; Entered Chart: 4 April 1993; Weeks in Chart: 5	10
