= Banking, Insurance and Finance Union =

Former trade union of the United Kingdom

- Merged into: UNIFI
- Founded: 1946
- Dissolved: 1999
- Headquarters: Sheffield House, Amity Grove, Raynes Park
- Location: United Kingdom
- Members: 171,000 (1990)
- Affiliations: TUC, A4F

The Banking, Insurance and Finance Union (BIFU) was a British trade union.

The union was founded in 1946 as the National Union of Bank Employees (NUBE), when the Bank Officers' Guild and the Scottish Bankers' Association merged. In 1979, it was renamed the Banking, Insurance and Finance Union. In 1999, it merged with the NatWest Staff Association and the Barclays Group Staff Union to form UNIFI.

By the time of its merger, the union had 113,000 members, in national and international banks, the Bank of England, insurance companies, building societies, finance houses and the Financial Services Authority. It was affiliated to the Trades Union Congress.

== General Secretaries ==
1946: T. G. Edwards
1959: James Hornby
1963: Alfred Brooks
1972: Leif Mills
1996: Ed Sweeney
