= Fred Bostock =

British trade union leader

Frederick Bostock (22 March 1899 – 13 July 1948) was a British trade union leader.

Born in the Gorton area of Manchester, Bostock began working for the Great Central Railway as a junior clerk, early in 1914. Later in the year, he enlisted with the Argyll and Sutherland Highlanders and fought with them on the Western Front throughout World War I. He was demobbed in 1919 and rejoined the railways, also signing up to the Railway Clerks' Association (RCA). Before the end of the year, he began working as a clerk for the RCA itself. He worked on attachment to the Great Western Railway (GWR), then the London and North Western Railway, and finally to the London, Midland and Scottish Railway (LMSR), where he became chief clerk. In 1937, he became line secretary for the GWR and Southern Railway, then in 1940 moved to hold the same post with the LMSR. By this time, he was a member of the executive committee of the International Transport Workers' Federation.

In September 1947, Bostock was elected to the General Council of the Trades Union Congress, and in December, he was elected as general secretary of the RCA. However, he died suddenly in July the following year.

Trade union offices
| Preceded by Charles Gallie | General Secretary of the Railway Clerks' Association; 1947–1948 | Succeeded by Percy Heady |
