= William Evans (trade unionist) =

British trade union leader

William John Evans (4 October 1899 – 23 August 1983) was a British trade union leader.

Evans began working for the London North Western Railway in 1916, but almost immediately left to serve in the Royal Navy, as World War I was ongoing. Demobbed in 1921, he returned to the railways, and joined the Associated Society of Locomotive Engineers and Firemen (ASLEF). He also became active in the Labour Party, and served on Eccles Town Council from 1932 to 1934.

In 1934, Evans was elected to the executive committee of ASLEF, and he served as the union's president from 1937 to 1939. He then became its full-time Organising Secretary, serving until 1956, when he was promoted to become Assistant General Secretary. He was elected as General Secretary of ASLEF in 1960, but retired three years later. From 1963 to 1969, he was the civil representative on the National Association for Employment of Regular Sailors, Soldiers and Airmen.

Evans also served on the General Council of the Trades Union Congress, and the executive of the International Transport Workers' Federation.

Trade union offices
Preceded by Percy Collick and Albert Hallworth	Assistant General Secretary of the Associated Society of Locomotive Engineers and Firemen; 1956–1960	Succeeded by Albert Griffiths
Preceded by Albert Hallworth	General Secretary of the Associated Society of Locomotive Engineers and Firemen; 1960–1963	Succeeded by Albert Griffiths
Preceded by Sidney Greene, Albert Hallworth and Bill Webber	Railways representative on the General Council of the Trades Union Congress; 1960–1963; With: Sidney Greene; Bill Webber	Succeeded by John Bothwell, Sidney Greene and Albert Griffiths
