= Albert Griffiths (trade unionist) =

British trade unionist

Albert Edward Griffiths (21 May 1908 – 13 February 1970) was a British trade unionist.

Born in Wolverhampton, Griffiths left school when he was fourteen and began working as a railway engine cleaner. He became a fireman in 1936, and then a driver in 1947. He was a member of the Associated Society of Locomotive Engineers and Firemen (ASLEF) for many years, and in 1956 became the union's full-time Irish Officer.

In 1958, Griffiths progressed to become ASLEF's organising secretary, and then the following year was chosen as its assistant general secretary. In 1964, he was elected as the general secretary of ASLEF, and with his increased prominence was also elected to the General Council of the Trades Union Congress, also serving on the National Board for Prices and Incomes.

Under Griffith's leadership, the union led a go slow on the railways in 1967.

Trade union offices
Preceded by William Evans	Assistant General Secretary of the Associated Society of Locomotive Engineers and Firemen; 1960–1963	Succeeded by Ray Buckton
Preceded by William Evans	General Secretary of the Associated Society of Locomotive Engineers and Firemen; 1964–1970	Succeeded by Ray Buckton
Preceded by William Evans, Sidney Greene and Bill Webber	Railways representative on the General Council of the Trades Union Congress; 1963–1969; With: Sidney Greene; John Bothwell (1963–1968); Percy Coldrick (1968–1969)	Succeeded by Percy Coldrick and Sidney Greene
