= Acas =

UK government's Advisory, Conciliation and Arbitration Service

- The Advisory, Conciliation and Arbitration Service
- Logo since 2018
- Formation: 1896; 130 years ago
- Type: non-departmental public body
- Headquarters: Windsor House, 50 Victoria Street, London, SW1H 0TL
- Coordinates: 51.497778°N 0.135°W
- Funding: Department for Business and Trade
- Website: acas.org.uk
- Formerly called: 1960: Industrial Relations Services; 1972: Conciliation and Advisory Service

The Advisory, Conciliation and Arbitration Service (Acas) is a non-departmental public body of the Government of the United Kingdom. Its purpose is to improve organisations and working life through the promotion and facilitation of strong industrial relations practice. Acas provides employment law and employment relations advice for employers and employees through its website and helpline. It also offers dispute resolution services such as arbitration or mediation, although the service is perhaps best known for its collective conciliation function – that is resolving disputes between groups of employees or workers, often represented by a trade union, and their employers.

Acas is an independent and impartial organisation that does not side with a particular party, but rather will help the parties to reach suitable resolutions in a dispute.

Today, the employment world has mostly moved away from large-scale industrial disputes that characterised the late 1970s to the mid-1980s, when Acas became a household name. Accordingly, Acas' emphasis has shifted towards helping businesses to prevent problems before they arise, by means of, for example, its telephone helpline and training sessions. Furthermore, much of Acas' conciliation work is now focused on individual complaints to an employment tribunal (i.e. where individuals claim their employer has denied them a legal right).

== History ==
Conciliation Act 1896 (Note: Section 8.)
- Act of Parliament
- Parliament of the United Kingdom
- Long title: An Act to make better Provision for the Prevention and Settlement of Trade Disputes.
- Citation: 59 & 60 Vict. c. 30
- Territorial extent: United Kingdom

Dates
- Royal assent: 7 August 1896
- Commencement: 7 August 1896 (Note: The Acts of Parliament (Commencement) Act 1793.)
- Repealed: 1 January 1976 (Note: Section 2 of, and schedule 1 to, the Employment Protection Act 1975 (Commencement No. 1) Order 1975 (SI 1975/1938).)
Other legislation
Repeals/revokes	Masters and Workmen Arbitration Act 1824; Councils of Conciliation Act 1867; Arbitration (Masters and Workmen) Act 1872
Repealed by	Employment Protection Act 1975

Status: Repealed

Text of statute as originally enacted

The service's roots lie in 1896, when the Conciliation Act 1896 (59 & 60 Vict. c. 30) was passed, and the government launched a voluntary conciliation and arbitration service, which also gave free advice to employers and unions on industrial relations and personnel problems.

There was a name change in 1960, to Industrial Relations Services, and again in 1972 to Conciliation and Advisory Service. Up to this point in its history the service remained firmly under the government's wing.

In 1974, the service was renamed the Conciliation and Arbitration Service and separated from government control, with an independent council to direct it.

'Advisory' was added to its name in 1975 to reflect its full range of services, then finally in 1976 Acas was made a statutory body by the Employment Protection Act 1975.

In 2010, there was speculation that the Conservative-Liberal Democrat coalition government's plans to reduce the number of quangos might threaten Acas, but the organisation survived the cuts.

The Enterprise and Regulatory Reform Act 2013 contained a number of employment law changes, including the introduction from April 2014 of a new 'early conciliation' service under which all claims relating to alleged infringements of individual employment rights will come to Acas in the first instance, rather than the Tribunals Service. Acas will then have a short window of opportunity (up to a month) to try to help to resolve the issue before the claimant can apply to a tribunal.

== Structure ==
Although Acas is largely funded by the Department for Business and Trade, it is a non-departmental public body, governed by an independent council which is responsible for determining Acas's strategic direction, policies and priorities, and for ensuring that its statutory duties are carried out effectively. This allows Acas to be independent, impartial and confidential.

The council consists of a chair and eleven members, some representing employers and trade unions and others independent, all appointed by the Secretary of State for Business, Energy and Industrial Strategy. Acas's current chair is Baroness Maggie Jones, who replaced Clare Chapman on 1 April 2026.

Acas's day-to-day operations are managed by its chief executive and a management board that includes its national and regional directors. Acas's current chief executive, Niall Mackenzie, was appointed in 2025, replacing Susan Clews. Acas has around 800 staff, based in its London head office and 11 main regional centres across England, Scotland and Wales. Acas's chief conciliator is Joanna Nunn, who was appointed in October 2025.

== List of chairs ==
1974: Jim Mortimer
1981: Pat Lowry
1987: Douglas Smith
1993: John Hougham
2000: Rita Donaghy
2007: Ed Sweeney
2014: Brendan Barber
2020: Clare Chapman
2026: Maggie Jones
