= Transport Salaried Staffs' Association =

British & Irish transport workers trade union

TSSA
- Transport Salaried Staffs' Association
- Founded: 1897; 129 years ago
- Headquarters: 2nd Floor, 17 Devonshire Square, London EC2M 4SQ
- Location: United Kingdom, Ireland
- Members: ▲17,235 (2024)
- General Secretary: Maryam Eslamdoust
- President: Adam Wilson
- Affiliations: TUC; ICTU; STUC; CSEU; ETF; Labour Party
- Website: tssa.org.uk

The Transport Salaried Staffs' Association (TSSA) is a trade union for workers in the transport and travel industries in the United Kingdom and Ireland. Its head office is in London, and it has regional offices in Bristol, Derby, Dublin, York and Glasgow.

TSSA has over 17,000 members in the UK and Ireland. While principally a union for people in the railway industry, the effect of the nationalisation and subsequent privatisations following the Second World War has meant that it has members working for railway companies, shipping companies, bus companies, travel agencies, airlines, call centres, and IT companies.

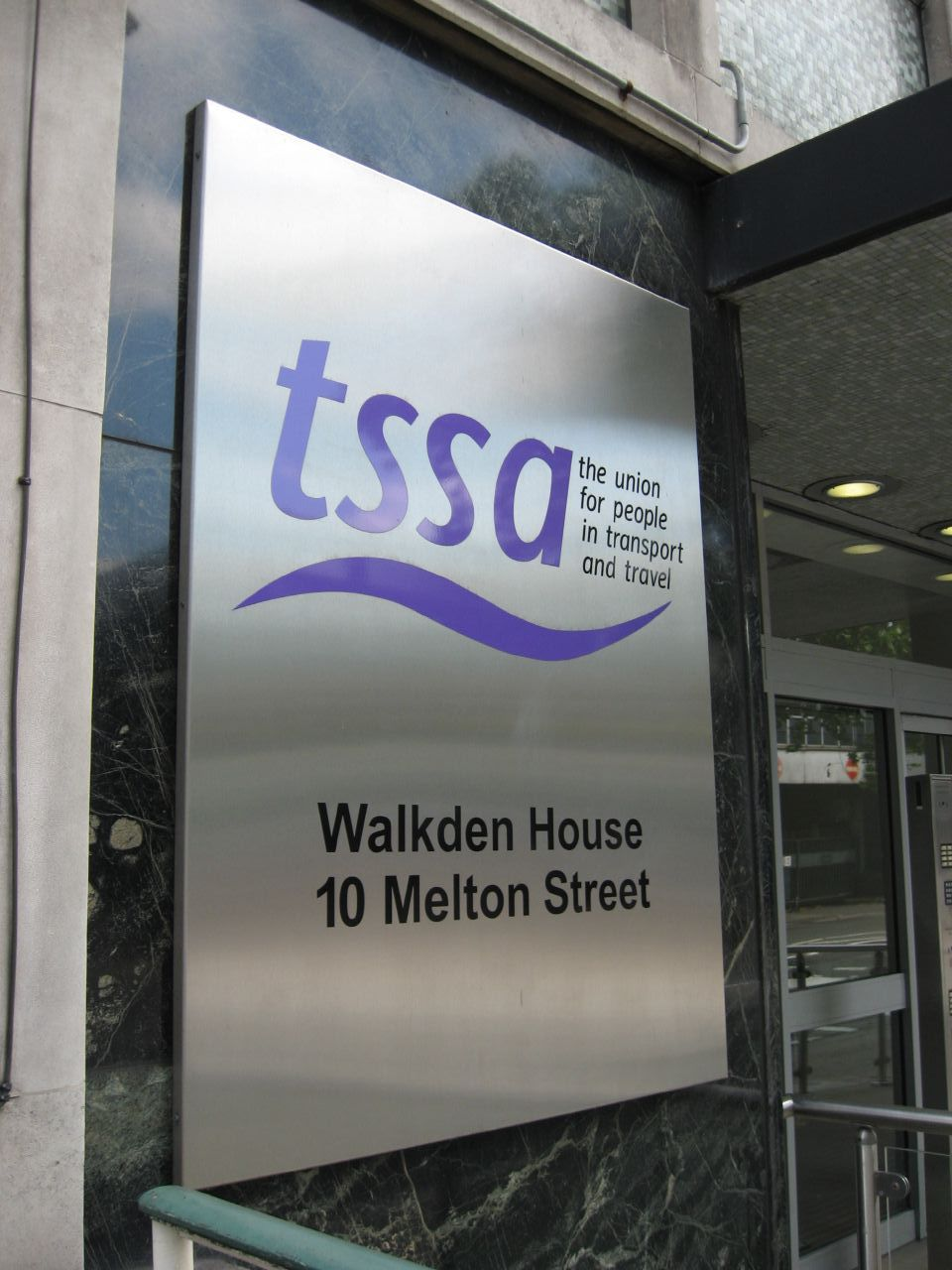
TSSA's former headquarters

== History ==
The union was founded in Sheffield in 1897 as the National Association of General Railway Clerks, although it was a narrow decision to found the union. The railway companies were strongly opposed to trade unions and two earlier attempts to form a clerks' union had failed and, discouraged, the organisers decided by a majority of only one vote to try a third time - this time successfully. In 1899 it was renamed the Railway Clerks' Association (RCA), and in 1951 it adopted its current name.

The union has been involved in at least one London Underground strike, between 6 and 7 September 2010.

In July 2015, TSSA endorsed Jeremy Corbyn's campaign in the Labour Party leadership election. TSSA National Political Officer, Sam Tarry spearheaded Corbyn's second leadership campaign.

In September 2021, TSSA announced that it was in talks about merging the union with the North American Boilermakers Union with the viewpoint of completing the merger by 1 July 2022. In January 2022, union representatives voted by 88% to agree to the merger, however the Boilermakers withdrew from the merger later in the year.

In early 2022, the General Secretary was accused of sexual harassment by a former TSSA employee, something which he vehemently denied and which had not been upheld after an internal investigation in 2018. A judge ordered an injunction which forbade the woman from talking about the alleged harassment.

Later that year TSSA commisioned a workplace review into the union led by Helena Kennedy KC. with the General Secretary retiring a month later.

The Kennedy Report in February 2023 said that the union had seen a culture of sexual harassment over the course of several years along with coercive behaviour. Kennedy called for several senior leaders of the union to resign and that external auditors should be brought in to examine the union's finances although to date, there are no reports about financial malpractice. An earlier critical report which concluded that equality, diversity and inclusion objectives were not being met was not made public until February 2023.

The inquiry led by Baroness Kennedy KC was commissioned as an internal workplace review, with the report explicitly saying that it wasn't a judicial, criminal, or civil investigation, and no court or tribunal has issued a legal finding about any of the allegations contained within it.

In May 2023 TSSA members elected a new President, Melissa Heywood, and Treasurer, Mary Sithole. This was the first time TSSA had elected women to both National Officer positions at the same time. Later in 2023 TSSA members elected a new General Secretary, Maryam Eslamdoust, who was the first woman and the first person of colour to hold the post.

The 2025 election for President and Treasurer was held in April 2025, but later TSSA announced the presidential election would be re-run and the re-run finished in October 2025. In January 2026, Adam Wilson was listed as President and Mary Sithole as Treasurer.

In 2025, the GMB union represented TSSA staff in an internal industrial dispute. The GMB stated that a staff survey had found 90% of TSSA employees described the TSSA as a "psychologically unsafe" place to work, with the TSSA acknowledging morale amongst staff was low. The Guardian reported that a GMB representative in TSSA had been suspended for trade union activities.

As of January 2026, TSSA reported that "Matters arising between TSSA and Manuel Cortes have been resolved amicably.

== Office holders ==
=== General Secretaries ===
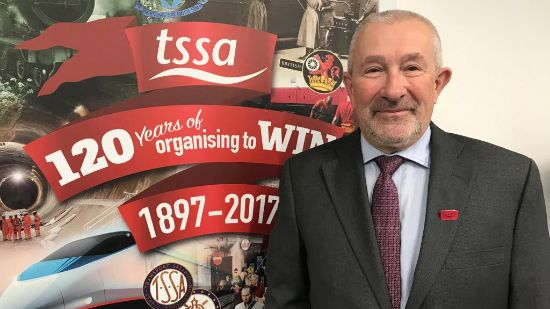
Peter Pendle, Joint Interim General Secretary, standing in TSSA Headquarters, 2023.

1897: Charles Bassett-Vincent
1898: John Hereford
1898: F. Parrish (acting)
1899: John Stopford Challener
1906: William J. West (acting)
1906: Alexander Walkden
1936: William Stott
1940: Charles Gallie
1947: Fred Bostock
1948: Percy Heady (acting)
1949: George Thorneycroft
1953: Bill Webber
1963: John Bothwell
1968: Percy Coldrick
1973: David Mackenzie
1977: Tom Bradley (acting)
1977: Tom Jenkins
1982: Bert Lyons
1989: Richard Rosser
2004: Gerry Doherty
2011: Manuel Cortes
2022: Frank Ward (acting)
2023: Peter Pendle (Interim Joint General Secretary)
2023: Maryam Eslamdoust

=== Presidents ===
1897: J. Batty Langley
1899: W. D. Leaver
1900: Fortescue Flannery
1906: William J. West
1908: George Lathan
1912: Herbert Romeril
1916: W. E. Williams
1919: Harry Gill
1932: Fred Simpson
1937: Frederick Watkins
1943: Percy Morris
1953: James Haworth
1956: Ray Gunter
1964: Tom Bradley
1977: Walter Johnson
1981: Jim Mills
1987: Geoff Henman
1993: Brenda Hanks
1997: David Horton
2001: David Porter
2005: Andy Bain
2011: Harriet Yeo
2013: Mick Carney
2023: Marios Alexandrou
2023: Melissa Heywood
2025: Adam Wilson

=== Treasurers ===
1906: J. M. Roberts
1920: W. E. Williams
1927: Arnold Townend
1934: Frederick Watkins MP
1937: Percy Morris
1943: James Haworth MP
1953: Ray Gunter MP
1956: Lord Lindgren
1961: Tom G. Bradley MP
1965: Walter Johnson MP
1977: Jock Newall (acting)
1977: Jim Mills
1981: Stanley Cohen MP
1984: Geoff Henman
1987: Brenda Hanks
1993: Peter Holloway (acting)
1993: David Horton
1997: David Porter
2001: Annie Breen
2004: Amarjit Singh (acting)
2004: Andy Bain
2005: Harriet Yeo
2011: Mick Carney
2013: Andy Bain
2015: Jason Turvey
2019: Al Stoten
2023: Nicola Jukes
2023: Mary Sithole
