= UNIFI (trade union) =

Former trade union of the United Kingdom

- changing minds, changing work
- Predecessor: Barclays Group Staff Union
- Merged into: Amicus
- Founded: 1999
- Dissolved: 2004
- Headquarters: 1b Amity Grove, Raynes Park
- Location: United Kingdom
- Members: 171,249 (2002)
- Key people: Ed Sweeney (general secretary)
- Affiliations: TUC, A4F
- Website: www.unifi.org.uk

UNIFI was a trade union representing workers in the finance sector in Britain. The name UNiFI was briefly adopted by the Barclays Group Staff Union in 1999. Later in the year, the union merged with the Banking, Insurance and Finance Union and the NatWest Staff Association, and the new organisation chose the very similar name "UNIFI". In 2004, UNIFI merged with Amicus, now part of Unite the Union. The organisation's general secretary was Ed Sweeney, and the national secretary was Rob MacGregor.

== General Secretaries ==
1999: Rory Murphy and Ed Sweeney
