= Jim Baty =

British trade unionist

James Gilroy Baty (1 February 1896 – 5 April 1959) was a British trade unionist.

Born in Newcastle-upon-Tyne, he began working on the railways, and joined the Associated Society of Locomotive Engineers and Firemen (ASLEF) in 1896. He devoted much of his time to trade unionism, being active on the trades council, serving on ASLEF's executive committee from 1928, and as its president in 1934.

In 1937, Baty began working full-time for ASLEF, as its organiser for the Bristol area, where he again became active on the Bristol Trades and Labour Council. In 1946, he became acting assistant general secretary of the union then, the following year, was elected as general secretary.

While leader, Baty served on the General Council of the Trades Union Congress (TUC), and was the TUC's representative to the American Federation of Labour in 1954. He was also prominent in the International Transport Workers' Federation, sitting on its general council and management committee.

In 1952, he declined the offer of the Commander of the Order of the British Empire award. Baty retired from union office in January 1956 and died three years later, aged 63.

Trade union offices
Preceded by Percy Collick	Acting Assistant General Secretary of ASLEF; 1946–1947; With: Percy Collick	Succeeded by Percy Collick and Albert Hallworth
Preceded by William P. Allen	General Secretary of ASLEF; 1947–1956	Succeeded by Albert Hallworth
Preceded by Charles Geddes and Edwin Hall	Trades Union Congress representative to the American Federation of Labour; 1954; With: Jock Tiffin	Succeeded by Jim Campbell and Tom Eccles
