= Bert Lyons (footballer) =

English footballer

Personal information
- Full name: Albert Thomas Lyons
- Date of birth: 5 March 1902
- Place of birth: Hednesford, England
- Date of death: 10 May 1981 (aged 79)
- Place of death: Great Yarmouth, England
- Height: 5 ft 11 in (1.80 m)
- Position: Full-back

Senior career*
Years	Team	Apps	(Gls)
1924	Port Vale	0	(0)
1925	Walsall	0	(0)
1926–1930	Clapton Orient	76	(0)
1930–1933	Tottenham Hotspur	54	(3)
- Colwyn Bay
Total		130+	(3+)
- * Club domestic league appearances and goals

Albert Thomas Lyons (5 March 1902 – 10 May 1981) was a professional footballer who played at full-back for Port Vale, Walsall, Clapton Orient, Tottenham Hotspur and Colwyn Bay. One of four brothers, two of his siblings also played League football.

== Career ==
Lyons spent the early part of his career at Port Vale and Walsall. In September 1926, he signed for Clapton Orient. He helped the club to narrowly avoid relegation out of the Second Division in 1926–27. They again escaped the drop in 1927–28, finishing one place and one point above relegated Fulham. However, they came last in 1928–29, and finished 12th in the Third Division South in 1929–30. He signed for Tottenham Hotspur in May 1930. He helped "Spurs" to finish third in the Second Division in 1930–31, and then eighth in 1931–32, before they finally won promotion with a second-place finish in 1932–33. Lyons featured in 57 games and scored three goals at White Hart Lane. Lyons ended his playing career at Colwyn Bay.

== Career statistics ==
Appearances and goals by club, season and competition
Club	Season	League			FA Cup		Total	
Club	Season	Division	Apps	Goals	Apps	Goals	Apps	Goals
Port Vale	1924–25	Second Division	0	0	0	0	0	0
Walsall	1925–26	Third Division North	0	0	0	0	0	0
Clapton Orient	1926–27	Second Division	16	0	0	0	16	0
Clapton Orient	1927–28	Second Division	9	0	0	0	9	0
Clapton Orient	1928–29	Second Division	12	0	0	0	12	0
Clapton Orient	1929–30	Third Division South	39	0	6	1	45	1
Clapton Orient	Total		76	0	6	1	82	1
Tottenham Hotspur	1930–31	Second Division	37	2	2	0	39	2
Tottenham Hotspur	1931–32	Second Division	17	1	1	0	18	1
Tottenham Hotspur	Total		54	3	3	0	57	3
Career total			130	3	9	1	139	4
