= Barclays Group Staff Union =

Former trade union of the United Kingdom

The Barclays Group Staff Union was a trade union representing workers at Barclays Bank in the United Kingdom.

The union was founded in about 1918 as the Barclays Bank Staff Association. It was registered as an independent trade union in about 1980, and by the mid-1990s had more than 46,000 members, representing over half of the bank's employees. In 1998, the union changed its name to UNiFI, then the following year merged with the Banking, Insurance and Finance Union and the NatWest Staff Association to form the very similarly named UNIFI.

== General Secretaries ==
c.1960: Cyril Kempson
1977: Eddie Gale
1993: Paul Snowball
