= NatWest Staff Association =

Former trade union of the United Kingdom

- Merged into: UNIFI
- Founded: 1969
- Dissolved: 1999
- Headquarters: Churchill Court, Palmerston Road, Bournemouth
- Location: United Kingdom
- Members: 34,343 (1997)
- Key people: Rory Murphy (general secretary)
- Affiliations: A4F

The NatWest Staff Association (NWSA) was a trade union representing staff at the National Westminster Bank in the United Kingdom.

The union was founded in 1969 as the National Westminster Staff Association with the merger of the National Provincial Bank and the Westminster Bank to form the National Westminster Bank. It was a union of the National Provincial Staff Association, National Provincial Bank Ladies' Guild, District Bank Staff Association and the Westminster Bank Guild. By 1980, it had nearly 34,000 members.

In 1999, the union merged with the Banking, Insurance and Finance Union and the Barclays Group Staff Union to form UNIFI. Some former members of the NatWest Staff Association disagreed with the merger and instead joined the Amalgamated Engineering and Electrical Union.
