= Bert Lyons (trade unionist) =

Charles Albert Lyons (13 August 1929 – 1 January 2008) was General Secretary of the Transport Salaried Staffs' Association (TSSA) and a member of the General Council of the Trades Unions Congress.

== Railway career ==
In 1950, Bert started working for British Rail, and joined the Labour Party and the Railway Clerks' Association (which a year later became the TSSA).

He became a full-time organiser for the TSSA in 1959, being appointed Scottish Secretary in 1965 and then LM Line Secretary in 1968. In 1977, Lyons was senior assistant general secretary.

== TSSA General Secretary ==
Following Tom Jenkins' retirement in 1982, Lyons was elected TSSA General Secretary, a position he retained until 1989.

Trade union offices
Preceded by Tom Jenkins	General Secretary of the Transport Salaried Staffs' Association; 1982–1989	Succeeded by Richard Rosser
