= Charles Gallie =

Scottish trade union leader

Charles Neill Gallie (7 November 1887 – 2 March 1960) was a Scottish trade union leader.

Born in Dornoch in Sutherlandshire, Gallie became a railway administrator in Coatbridge, and joined the Railway Clerks' Association (RCA) in 1906. He was soon elected as branch secretary of the union, and in 1919 became a full-time union official, serving as Scottish secretary from 1920. While in this role, he was active at the Scottish Trades Union Congress, serving as its president in 1922 and again in 1931, and as treasurer for eight years.

Gallie was also active in the Labour Party, and stood in Forfar at the 1924 and 1929 United Kingdom general elections, taking third place on each occasion.

In 1940, Gallie was promoted to become Chief Assistant Secretary of the RCA. Later in the year, General Secretary William Stott died, and Gallie was elected to fill the post. While general secretary, he also served on the General Council of the Trades Union Congress. He retired from his union posts in 1947, joining the board of directors of Cable & Wireless. In 1949, he was appointed to the Monopolies and Restrictive Practices Commission, serving until 1958.

Trade union offices
Preceded by James Walker	President of the Scottish Trades Union Congress; 1922	Succeeded by James Murdoch
Preceded by Robert Watson	President of the Scottish Trades Union Congress; 1931	Succeeded by William Leonard
Preceded by Fred Simpson	Chief Assistant Secretary of the Railway Clerks' Association; 1940	Succeeded by ?
Preceded by William Stott	General Secretary of the Railway Clerks' Association; 1940 – 1947	Succeeded by Fred Bostock
