= Nizlopi =

British folk and alternative duo

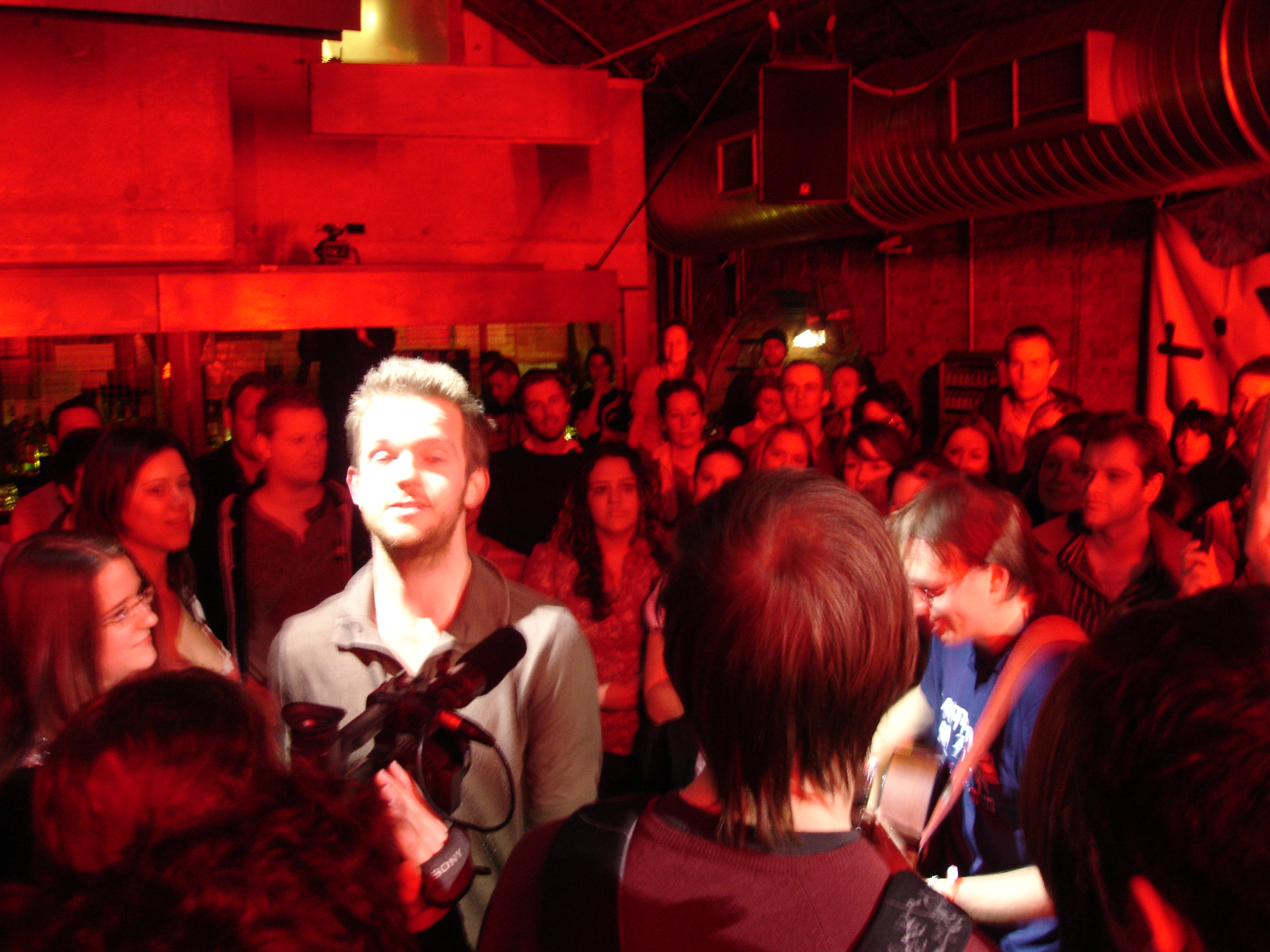
- Nizlopi performing in 2006

Background information
- Origin: Royal Leamington Spa, England
- Genres: Folk, hip hop
- Years active: 2003–2020, 2025-
- Label: FDM Records
- Past members: Luke Concannon; John Parker
- Website: Nizlopi

Nizlopi /nɪzˈlɒpi/ are a British folk and alternative music duo formed in Leamington Spa, England, by Luke Concannon on vocals, guitar, and bodhrán, and John Parker on double bass, human beatbox, and backing vocals.

== History ==
=== Formation ===
The duo grew up in Leamington Spa and attended Trinity Catholic School together. They formed a band and would make up the reason for the name including naming it after a Hungarian girl on whom Concannon had a crush at school. They started out performing throughout England, building a small but loyal fan base. Future musical artist and performer Ed Sheeran was their guitar technician at many of their early shows and has stated they were a major influence on his musical style.

=== Half These Songs Are About You (2003–2006) ===
In early 2004, they released their first album Half These Songs Are About You with FDM Records. In 2007, they received an Impala Platinum award recognizing sales of the album in Europe. It was produced by Gavin Monaghan, also known for his work with Scott Matthews and Robert Plant. Their first release, "JCB", is their most successful song. The song is about Luke's dyslexia at school, from which he sought escape by accompanying his father to work. Released as a single in June 2005, it reached number 160 in the UK Singles Chart. The single was re-released in the UK in December that year. It reached number one on 18 December 2005, selling more than double the copies of their closest competitor, Westlife. It eventually won the duo an Impala Platinum award recognizing sales of over 500,000 copies of the song across Europe in 2007. Dermot O'Leary gave the track extensive airplay on his BBC Radio 2 show. Some bookmakers put it in the running for Christmas number one but the winner of The X Factor, Shayne Ward's début single, "That's My Goal" won that honour. The music video received widespread airplay, mainly on the VH1 music television channel. The video was an animation, made by Laith Bahrani (aka Monkeehub) who also animated an unofficial video for an acoustic version of "Creep" by Radiohead.

Their follow-up single, "Girls", was released on 3 April 2006. The band have described the song's music video on radio interviews as "Tim Burton-esque". Karni & Saul of Flynn Productions directed the video, which was the first video in which the band appeared. Like "JCB", it was first released on the Internet. Limited radio play meant the song did not chart in the UK top 40.

=== The ExtraOrdinary EP (2006) ===
An EP containing six songs and titled ExtraOrdinary, was released on 4 September 2006. The six tracks included two that had been released before – "Helen" and "Yesterday" – which were previously released on the "JCB" and "Girls" EPs respectively. The record is an attempt to strip down the orchestral production of their early work to represent the duo's vibrant live sound.

The EP contained the track "Homage To Young Men", a spoken-word piece written and performed by Alastair McIntosh. McIntosh was inspired to write this piece after working with Concannon and performed live twice with the band. The band have likened Alastair's performances to "the howlings of a wild animal". McIntosh is well known for his contributions to the Scottish version of "Thought for the Day" and has been dubbed "The Rapping Reverend".

=== Make It Happen (2007–2010) ===
The second album, titled "Make It Happen", was released on 31 March 2008. The album was recorded with producer Phil Brown who had formerly produced artists such as Bob Marley. The album was recorded on 2-inch tape, a traditional style of recording said to create a more 'raw' sound that is popular with musicians preceding the era of digital recording technology. The album included guest appearances by Martyn Barker (percussion/drums), Andy Simms (piano), Jonnie Fielding (violin), Jack Hobbs (vocal/scratching), Rory Simmons (trumpet), Kadially Kouyaté (kora & Senegalese vocals), Rory McLeod (harmonica), The Individuals Dedicated to the Ministry of Christ choir and a contribution by the poet Benjamin Zephaniah.

Nizlopi performed at the Glastonbury Festival in 2005, 2007 and 2008.

The release was preceded on 17 March 2008 by a digital single, "Start Beginning". In November of that year they completed a tour entitled "Last Nights on Tour". Afterwards they announced using both their official website and on social media website Myspace that they would be taking the year 2009 off and would meet while travelling in Cuba to discuss the band's future.

=== Sporadic appearances and split (2010–2020) ===
Despite splitting twice during a 10-year spell, the band have always come back together for one-off gigs and festival appearances.

The band members confirmed that they split on 10 February 2010, when an e-mail was sent out to all mailing list subscribers confirming that the band had split up after being together for 7 years, with Concannon stating:

And that after many wild meanderings and much confusion I feel I must go on, on my own from here. That my dream is now to do another project, not Nizlopi, and to build a new life. So, this is good bye from Nizlopi. We are no more! Wow, there you go I said it. Scary as it is.

— Luke Concannon

Concannon announced that he was working on a solo album and had planned to set up his own website by 2011 via the band's mailing list and previewed new material on Touch FM's "First Break Show". He had also been taking part in song-writing workshops.

The split ended with an announcement on their website in late 2011 "Luke and John got back together" to headline a one-off charity concert at the Union Chapel in London on 22 November 2011. They have since been playing live shows sporadically.

Despite the numerous splits, Nizlopi have continued to perform sporadically at numerous gigs across the UK. They duo have also performed many charity events, music venues, festivals and intimate pub gigs.

They released a live album in 2014 titled "Nizlopi: Live in London" via iTunes. The band toured in May 2015 with the Get Radical tour for 10 dates across the UK. They also performed at Glastonbury Festival and the Secret Garden Party festivals in 2015.

The duo hosted a songwriting residential in June 2019 in Birmingham, UK. In March 2020, the band announced they have split, but did announce they will release a "Best Of" album at the end of the year.

Parker is now working as a freelance session double-bassist. Concannon is travelling and writing. Concannon currently resides in Boston, Massachusetts.

=== Reunion and opening for Ed Sheeran (2025-) ===
In October 2025, Nizlopi performed a one off show at The Water Rats in London, seemingly indicating their reunion. They then performed another show at The Moth Club also in London, in November.

They opened for Ed Sheeran on his Play tour, alongside BIIRD.

== Live shows ==
On 14 October 2008, Nizlopi played an intimate version of "Answers" on a balcony overlooking Camden Lock for the music viral show BalconyTV.

The band played at Solfest in 2008.

The duo also appeared at 'Lainfest' in August 2013 and 'Barn on the Farm' in July 2013.

== Discography ==
=== Studio albums ===
Title	Details	Peak chart positions	Certifications
Title	Details	UK	Certifications
Half These Songs Are About You	Released: 16 August 2004; Label: FDM Records; Format: Digital download, CD	88	BPI: Silver
Make it Happen	Released: 31 March 2008; Label: FDM Records; Format: Digital download, CD	—	
"—" denotes an album that did not chart or was not released.

=== Live albums ===
Title	Details
Live	Released: 20 October 2014; Label: Self-released; Format: Digital download

=== Extended plays ===
Title	Details
ExtraOrdinary	Released: 4 September 2006; Label: FDM Records; Format: Digital download
Looking for Answers	Released: 25 May 2009; Label: FDM Records; Format: Digital download
Ltd Edition UpRise	Released: 2011; Label: FDM Records; Format: Digital download

=== Singles ===
Year	Title	Peak chart positions			Certifications	Album
Year	Title	UK	AUS	IRL	Certifications	Album
2005	"Fine Story"	—	—	—		Half These Songs Are About You
2005	"JCB" (Note: "JCB" was originally released in June 2005, when it entered the UK Singles Chart at number 160. It was re-released on 12 December 2005 and peaked at number 1.)	1	43	1	BPI: Platinum	Half These Songs Are About You
2006	"Girls"	91	—	—		Half These Songs Are About You
"—" denotes a single that did not chart or was not released.
