= Kay Carberry, Baroness Carberry of Muswell Hill =

British trade unionist (born 1950)

The Right Honourable The Baroness Carberry of Muswell Hill CBE
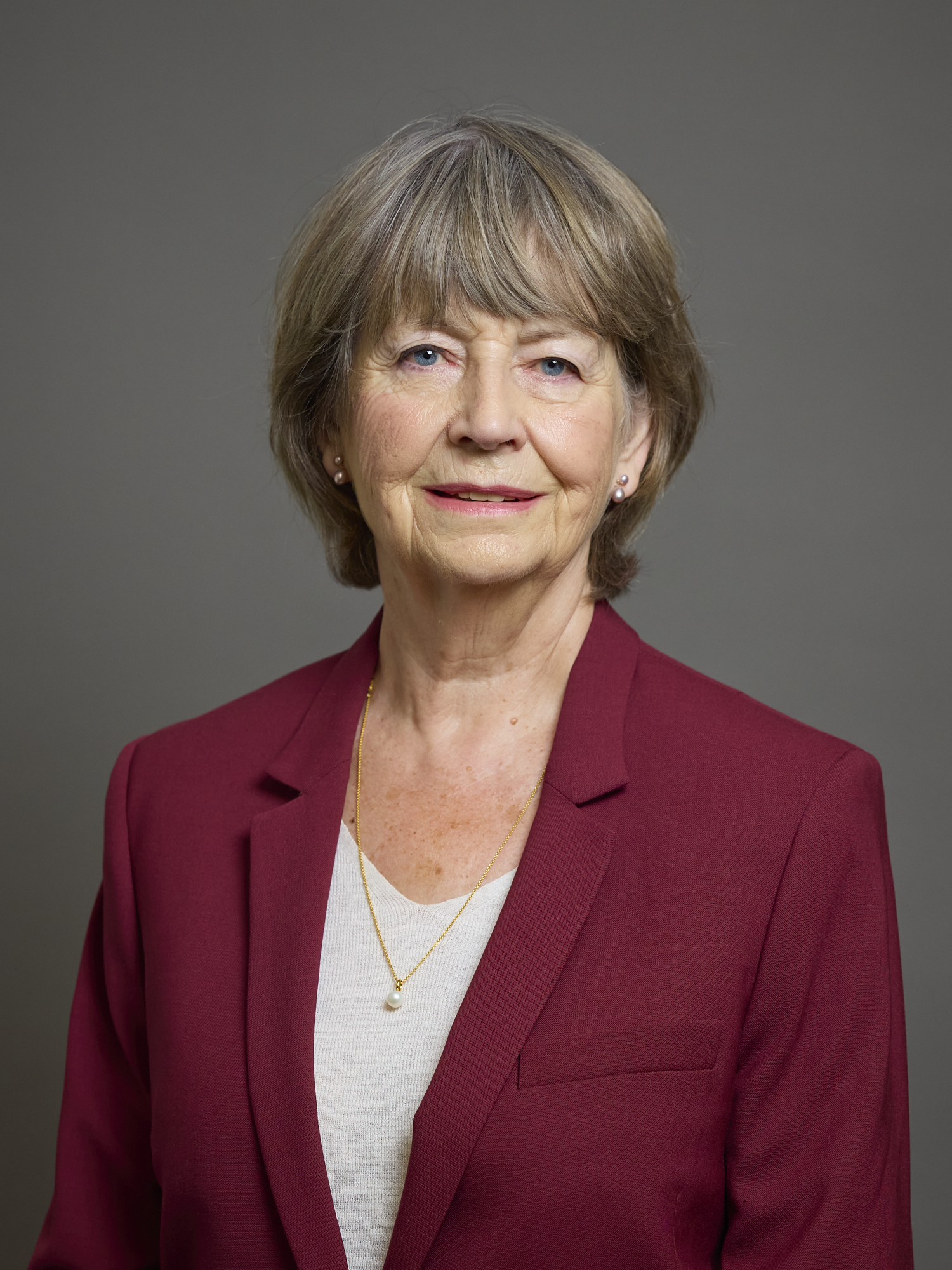
- Official portrait, 2025

Assistant General Secretary of the Trades Union Congress
- In office 2003–2016
- General Secretary: Brendan Barber; Frances O'Grady
- Preceded by: David Lea (1999)
- Succeeded by: Kate Bell (2022)

Member of the House of Lords
- Lord Temporal
- Life peerage 30 January 2025

Personal details
- Born: 19 October 1950 (age 76)
- Party: Labour
- Education: University of Sussex
- Profession: Trade unionist, teacher

Catherine Rose Carberry, Baroness Carberry of Muswell Hill, CBE (born 19 October 1950) is a British trade unionist and life peer. She was Assistant General Secretary of the Trades Union Congress (TUC) from 2003 to 2016.

Carberry was educated at the Royal Naval School Tal-Handaq in Malta, then at the University of Sussex. She worked as a teacher for three years, and became active in the National Union of Teachers (NUT), where she took employment as a researcher. She began working for the TUC in 1978, and in 1988 was appointed as the first head of its Equal Rights Department. In 2003, she was appointed to the vacant post of Assistant General Secretary of the TUC.

Carberry has held a number of other posts. She was a commissioner on the Equality and Human Rights Commission, and the Equal Opportunities Commission. She also served as commissioner of the Low Pay Commission and as a board member of Transport for London. She is a trustee of the People's History Museum, a director of TU Fund Managers, an alternate member of The Takeover Panel and an honorary fellow of St Hugh's College, Oxford.

Carberry was appointed a Commander of the Order of the British Empire (CBE) in the 2007 Birthday Honours, for services to Employment Relations. She retired from the TUC in 2016. She was created Baroness Carberry of Muswell Hill, of Muswell Hill in the London Borough of Haringey on 30 January 2025 as part of the 2024 Political Peerages.

Trade union offices
| Preceded by Anne Gibson as Women's Officer | Head of the Equal Rights Department of the Trades Union Congress; 1988–2003 | Succeeded by Sarah Veale |
| Vacant Title last held by David Lea | Assistant General Secretary of the Trades Union Congress; 2003–2016; Served alongside: Paul Nowak (2013–2016) | Succeeded by Post vacant |
