= George Woodcock (trade unionist) =

British trade union leader (1904–1979)

The Right Honourable George Woodcock CBE
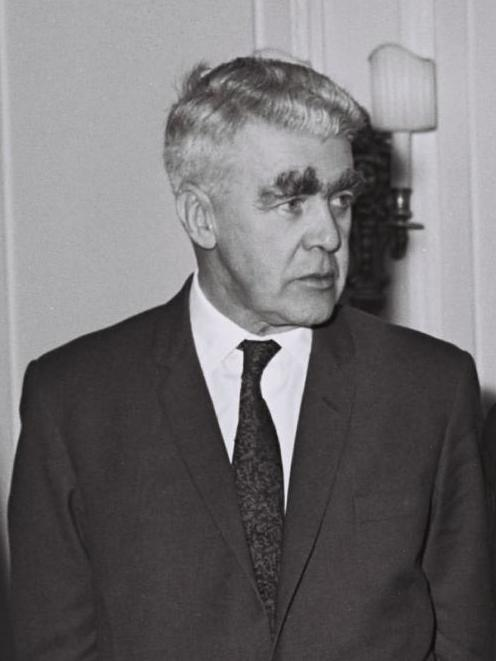
- Woodcock in March 1965

General Secretary of the Trades Union Congress
- In office 6 September 1960 – 26 February 1969
- Preceded by: Sir Vincent Tewson
- Succeeded by: Vic Feather

Assistant General Secretary of the Trades Union Congress
- In office 1947–1960
- General Secretary: Sir Vincent Tewson
- Preceded by: Vincent Tewson
- Succeeded by: Vic Feather

Personal details
- Born: 20 October 1904 Bamber Bridge, Lancashire, England
- Died: 30 October 1979 (aged 75) Epsom, Surrey, England
- Spouse: Laura Mary McKernan (m. 1933)
- Children: 2
- Education: Ruskin College
- Occupation: Trade unionist

George Woodcock, CBE (20 October 1904 – 30 October 1979) was a British trade unionist and general secretary of the Trades Union Congress from 1960 to 1969.

Born and brought up in Bamber Bridge, Lancashire, he started work at age 12 in the local cotton mill. He became, in 1924, an official of the Bamber Bridge and District Weavers' Union. He was also active in the Independent Labour Party and the Labour Party. In 1929 he won a TUC scholarship to Ruskin College, Oxford, in 1929. In 1933 he married Laura McKernan. Having distinguished himself at undergraduate and postgraduate level, and following two years in the civil service, Woodcock joined the TUC in 1936 as head of the research and economic department. Here, Woodcock was much influenced by leading moderates in the trade union movement, such as Walter Citrine and Ernest Bevin, and also by the economic ideas of John Maynard Keynes.

In 1947 he became the TUC's Assistant General Secretary and in 1960, was appointed General Secretary, serving in that position until 1969. In 1970 Woodcock was a candidate for the Chancellorship of the University of Kent at Canterbury, but lost to Jo Grimond.

Trade union offices
Preceded by Vincent Tewson	Assistant General Secretary of the TUC; 1947–1960	Succeeded by Vic Feather
Preceded by Vincent Tewson	General Secretary of the TUC; 1960–1969	Succeeded by Vic Feather
