= Alec Firth =

British trade union official

Alec Sandy Firth (1892 – date of death unknown) was a British trade union official.

Born in London, Firth attended Shelley Elementary School, then won scholarships to Penistone Grammar School, followed by Huddersfield Technical College. He won the Martin Fisher Travelling Scholarship in 1915, but due to the outbreak of World War I, he instead completed a degree in economics with the University of London External Programme, and became an assistant lecturer at the Huddersfield Technical College. He briefly served in the Royal Navy, but was discharged for medical reasons.

Firth found work as the deputy statistical officer at the Department of Wool Textile Production in the War Office, then as secretary of a company of wool brokers, before moving to the Board of Trade, serving in its Profiteering Act Department.

A supporter of the Labour Party, Firth was asked to stand in Penistone at the 1918 United Kingdom general election, but was unable to, as he was a civil servant. He began working as education officer of the Trades Union Congress (TUC) in 1921, during this period standing unsuccessfully in Cambridge at the 1922, 1923 and 1924 United Kingdom general elections. In 1923, he became an Assistant General Secretary of the TUC.

In 1931, Firth became secretary of the Workers' Educational Association; he resigned in 1934, due to poor health.

Trade union offices
Preceded by New position	Secretary of the Education Department of the Trades Union Congress; 1921–1931	Succeeded by Jack Wray
Preceded by Fred Bramley	Assistant General Secretary of the Trades Union Congress; 1923–1931; With: Walter Citrine (1924–1925)	Succeeded by Vincent Tewson
Non-profit organization positions
Preceded by John William Muir	General Secretary of the Workers' Educational Association; 1931–1934	Succeeded by Ernest Green
