= Kate Bell (trade unionist) =

British trade unionist

Kate Bell is a British trade unionist, and the current assistant general secretary to the Trades Union Congress (TUC), having been appointed to the role in December 2022. She succeeded her predecessor, Paul Nowak, who took up the post of General Secretary of the TUC on 29 December 2022.

== Career ==
Bell was head of policy and public affairs for a local authority, before serving as Work and Pensions adviser to Ed Miliband during his tenure as leader of the Labour Party. She has also worked for the charities Child Poverty Action Group and Gingerbread.

After joining the TUC in 2016, she became the organisation's head of rights, international, social and economics. In June 2018, she was appointed to the Low Pay Commission, where she played a role in helping to secure the furlough scheme by meeting with government ministers and civil servants during the COVID-19 pandemic. Her term with the Low Pay Commission ended on 17 November 2022.

On 7 December it was announced that she would succeed Paul Nowak as assistant general secretary of the TUC when Nowak became the TUC's general secretary at the end of the year.
