= Len Murray =

British politician & peer (1922–2004)

The Right Honourable The Lord Murray of Epping Forest OBE PC

General-Secretary of the TUC
- In office 1973–1984
- Preceded by: Vic Feather
- Succeeded by: Norman Willis

Assistant General-Secretary of the TUC
- In office 1969–1973
- Preceded by: Vic Feather
- Succeeded by: Norman Willis

Member of the House of Lords
- Lord Temporal
- Life peerage 14 February 1985 – 20 May 2004

Personal details
- Born: Lionel Hodskinson; 2 August 1922 Hadley, Shropshire, England
- Died: 20 May 2004 (aged 81) Loughton, Essex, England
- Party: Labour
- Other political affiliations: CPGB
- Spouse: Heather Woolf (m. 1945)
- Children: 4, including David Murray
- Education: New College, Oxford

Lionel Murray, Baron Murray of Epping Forest, OBE, PC (2 August 1922 – 20 May 2004) was a British Labour Party politician and trade union leader. He served as the General Secretary of the Trades Union Congress from 1973 to 1984.

== Early life ==
Murray was born in Hadley, Shropshire, the son of a young unmarried woman, Lorna Hodskinson, and was brought up by a local nurse, Mary Jane Chilton. He attended Wellington Grammar School, read English at Queen Mary College, London, and then joined the British Army.

=== Army ===
In the Second World War Murray was commissioned in the King's Shropshire Light Infantry in April 1943 and took part in the Normandy landings on D-Day. Six days later, Murray was badly wounded and in October 1944 was invalided out of the army with the rank of lieutenant.

=== Demobilisation ===
Murray worked at an engineering works in Wolverhampton as storekeeper, before leaving to sell The Daily Worker on street corners and joining the Communist Party. Whilst selling The Daily Worker, he encountered his former headmaster, who informed him he was wasting his time. Determined to improve himself, shortly afterwards Murray gained a place at New College, Oxford, where he graduated with a First in PPE after two years' study under tutors including the future MP Dick Crossman and Sir John Hicks.

== Career ==
Murray started as a manager for a Liverpool catering firm. He was a Trades Union Congress (TUC) employee from 1947, when he joined as an assistant in the economics department. Seven years later he was promoted to head of the department. He was elected assistant general-secretary in 1969.

In 1970 he was invited to deliver the Marlow (Scotland) Lecture to the Institution of Engineers and Shipbuilders in Scotland. He chose the subject Trade Unions and the State – 1964 to 1970 in Retrospect.

He became General Secretary of the TUC in 1973, leading it during the Winter of Discontent and the confrontations with Margaret Thatcher's government.

== Personal life ==
Murray married Heather Woolf, a nurse, in 1945. The couple had two daughters and two sons, the younger of whom, David, pursued a successful career in the Royal Air Force. They lived in Loughton, Essex.

Murray served as a TUC officer until his retirement in 1984, three years early. Upon his retirement in early May 1984, he made the following statement – "There are places to go, books to read, flowers to smell and trees to look at. I would like to walk through Epping Forest".

Murray played an active role in the Methodist Church and served as a lay preacher. Murray died in hospital in 2004 from septicaemia and pneumonia.

== Honours ==
Murray was appointed Officer of the Order of the British Empire (OBE) in the 1966 New Year Honours.

Sworn of the Privy Council in 1976, he was created a life peer as Baron Murray of Epping Forest, of Telford in the County of Shropshire, on 14 February 1985. The Murray Hall in Loughton was named after him, and a blue plaque to him was unveiled on the family house, 29 The Crescent, in January 2019.

Trade union offices
| Preceded by Vic Feather | Assistant General Secretary of the TUC; 1969 – 1973 | Succeeded by Norman Willis |
| Preceded by Vic Feather | General Secretary of the TUC; 1973 – 1984 | Succeeded by Norman Willis |
