= Vic Feather =

British propagandist and General Secretary of the Trade Union Congress (1908–1976)

The Right Honourable The Lord Feather CBE
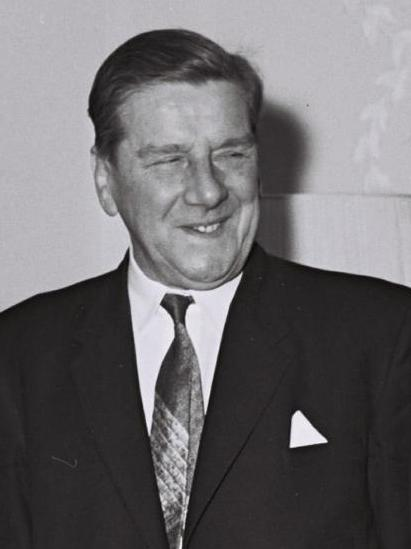
- Vic Feather, 1965

President of the European Trade Union Confederation
- In office 1973–1974
- Preceded by: Heinz Oskar Vetter
- Succeeded by: Heinz Oskar Vetter

General Secretary of the Trades Union Congress
- In office 26 February 1969 – 7 September 1973^{1}
- Preceded by: George Woodcock
- Succeeded by: Len Murray

Assistant General Secretary of the Trades Union Congress
- In office 1960–1969
- General Secretary: George Woodcock
- Preceded by: George Woodcock
- Succeeded by: Len Murray

Personal details
- Born: 10 April 1908 Idle, Bradford, West Riding of Yorkshire, England
- Died: 28 July 1976 (aged 68)
- ^{1} Acting from 26 February 1969 to 2 September 1969

Victor Grayson Hardie Feather, Baron Feather, CBE (10 April 1908 – 28 July 1976) was a British trade unionist and General Secretary of the Trade Union Congress in Great Britain from 1969 to 1973.

== Early life and career ==
Feather was born in Idle, Bradford, West Riding of Yorkshire in 1908, and was named after the recently elected socialist MP Victor Grayson. He was educated at Hanson Grammar School in Bradford. He began work at age 14 and joined the Shopworkers' Union. He was elected shop steward at age 15, and chairman of his branch committee at age 21. In the 1920’s he worked for Frank Betts (father of future Labour UK Employment Secretary Barbara Castle MP) as a journalist and cartoonist for ‘The Bradford Pioneer’. In 1937 he joined the staff of the Trades Union Congress. He became Assistant Secretary (1947–60), Assistant General Secretary (1960–69), and General Secretary (1969–73). He was appointed Commander of the Order of the British Empire (CBE) in the 1961 New Year Honours.

As General Secretary, Feather led the British trade union movement's fight against Heath government's Industrial Relations Act 1971. After retirement from the TUC, he was President of the European Trade Union Confederation (1973–74). He was created a life peer as Baron Feather, of the City of Bradford on 6 March 1974. Lord Feather died two years later in 1976.

With his blunt Yorkshire manner, he was something of a "character" in British public life. He was often imitated by Mike Yarwood. When he appeared on Parkinson he admitted to stealing sheep in the 1930s. He was the subject of an episode of This Is Your Life, first broadcast on 28 November 1973.

=== Propaganda activities ===
During his time as assistant secretary of the TUC, he was secretly being paid to write anti-communist propaganda by the Information Research Department (IRD), a secret branch of the UK Foreign Office which dealt in weaponised disinformation, anti-communism, and pro-colonial propaganda. Feather's book Trade Unions:True or False was published via Background Books, a propaganda front for the IRD. British propagandists also used Feather's services to promote anti-communist propaganda from within the TUC.

== Personal life ==
He married Alice Ellison in 1930 and they had two children together, Alexander and Patricia.

Trade union offices
Preceded by George Woodcock	Assistant General Secretary of the TUC; 1960–1969	Succeeded by Len Murray
Preceded by George Woodcock	General Secretary of the TUC; 1969–1973	Succeeded by Len Murray
Preceded by New position	President of the ETUC; 1973–1974	Succeeded by Heinz Oskar Vetter
