= 1970 University of Kent at Canterbury Chancellor election =

The 1970 University of Kent at Canterbury election for the position of Chancellor was called following the death of the first Chancellor, Princess Marina, Duchess of Kent, on 27 August 1968. Following protracted discussions and arrangements the election was held on 7 May 1970, with the winner Jo Grimond installed in July 1970.

== Electorate, nominations and rules ==
The death of Princess Marina came suddenly, less than four years after the University's creation, and no formal process had been developed for selecting a new Chancellor.

The relevant Statute is, in fact, rather unhelpful about any details, merely saying that the appointment is to be made by the Court on the nomination of the Council after consultation with the Senate.

Although in theory a Chancellor could have been appointed in the same manner as the Vice-Chancellor, growing demands for student participation in the running of universities and a belief that the Chancellor should represent the entire University led to the Council and Senate agreeing to a direct election by all students, monthly-paid staff and members of the Council.

Because of concerns that a frivolous candidate might be elected, a complex system of nominations was agreed:

- All members of the electorate could nominate, but nominations would initially remain confidential
- A joint committee of six members nominated by the Council, six members nominated by the Senate and six members elected by the students at large would consider the nominations
- A short-list would be drawn up of those who received the support of at least fourteen members of the committee (thus requiring support in all three sections of the membership) and who were not objected to by more than four members (thus allowing each section as a whole a veto).
- Candidates on the short-list would be asked to indicate their assent to taking part in the election.
- Only then would the remaining names be made public.

Voting was to be by means of the alternative vote.

The process was not begun until October 1969. The joint committee was initially chaired by Sydney Irving, Chairman of Ways and Means of the House of Commons.

== Candidates ==
Only those who were approved by the committee and assented to the election had their names made public. Several people whose names were approved subsequently declined the position.

Those who were put to the electorate were as follows:

- William Golding, author and poet.
- Jo Grimond, Member of Parliament for Orkney and Shetland and former leader of the Liberal Party.
- Dame Kathleen Lonsdale, crystallographer and pacifist campaigner, first woman professor at University College London.
- George Woodcock, recently retired General Secretary of the TUC.

== Result ==
By agreement the numbers were not revealed, but all four candidates "were understood to have received 'respectable' votes". Jo Grimond was declared elected, and formally installed at the start of July. He served in the post until 1990.
