= Roy Jackson =

Roy Jackson may refer to:

- Roy Jackson (American football) (1876–1944), early player for the Duquesne Country and Athletic Club
- Roy Jackson (artist) (1944–2013), Australian contemporary artist
- Roy Jackson (chemical engineer) (1931–2026), British chemical engineer
- Roy Jackson (politician) (1895–1964), member of the Australian Labor Party
- Roy Jackson (trade unionist) (1928–2010), British trade unionist
- Roy Lee Jackson (born 1954), American baseball player
