= John Monks =

General Secretary of the TUC (born 1945)

The Right Honourable The Lord Monks
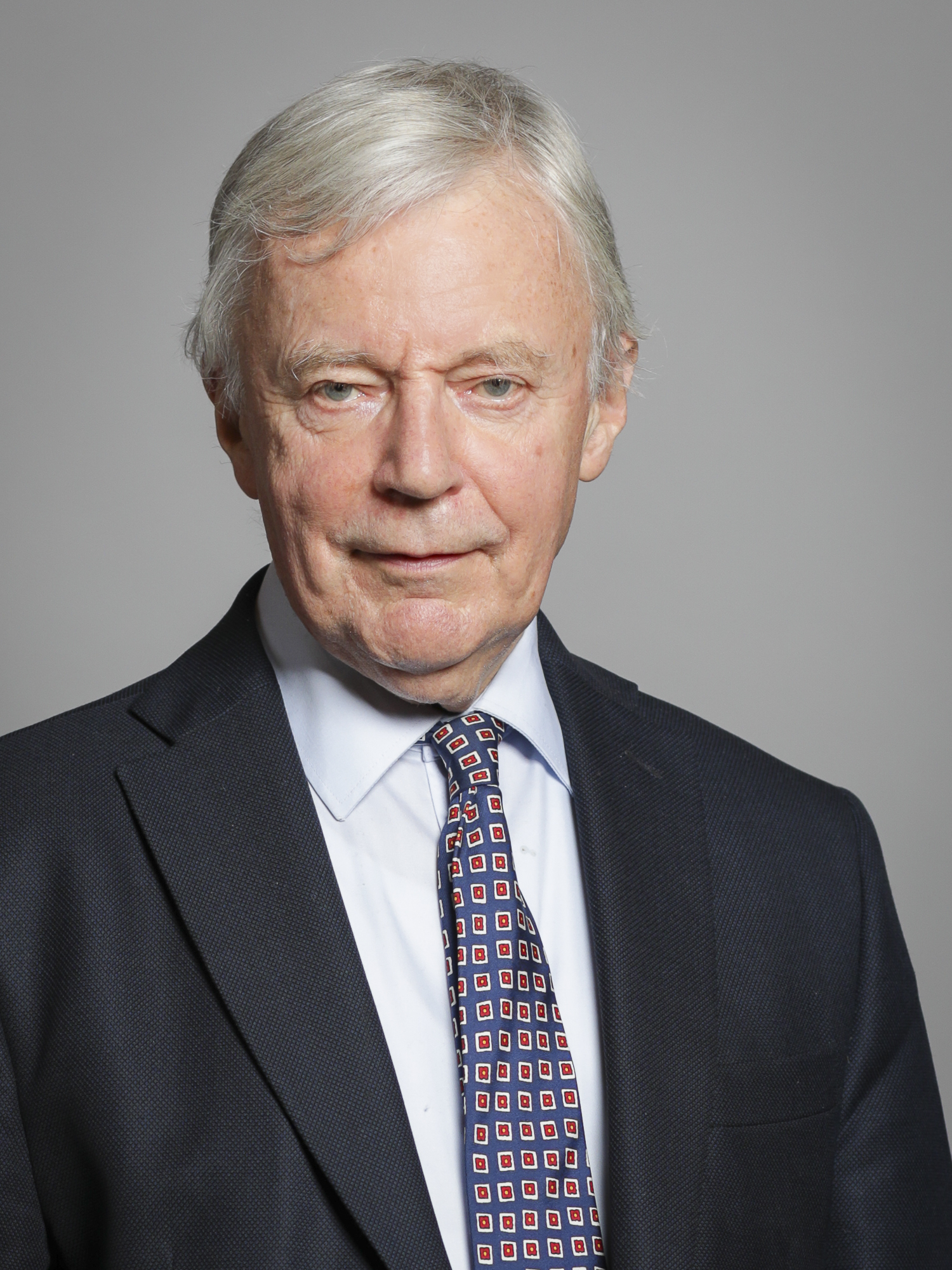

Member of the House of Lords
- Lord Temporal
- Life peerage 26 July 2010

General Secretary of the Trades Union Congress
- In office 1993–2003
- Preceded by: Norman Willis
- Succeeded by: Brendan Barber

Deputy General Secretary of the Trades Union Congress
- In office 1987–1993
- Preceded by: Kenneth Graham
- Succeeded by: Brendan Barber

Personal details
- Born: 5 August 1945 (age 81) Blackley, Manchester, England
- Party: Labour and Co-operative
- Education: University of Nottingham

John Stephen Monks, Baron Monks (born 5 August 1945) is a Labour Co-operative member of the House of Lords and former trade unionist leader, who served as the General Secretary of the Trades Union Congress (TUC) in the UK from 1993 until 2003. He also served as the General Secretary of the European Trade Union Confederation (ETUC) from 2007 until 2011, having been made a Life peer in 2010.

== Early life ==
Monks was born in Blackley, Manchester, and educated at Ducie Technical School in Moss Side. He studied Economic History at the University of Nottingham.

== Career ==
From 1967 to 1969, he was a management trainee and junior manager with Plessey in Surrey.

=== TUC ===
He joined the TUC in 1969 and by 1977 was the head of the Organisation and Industrial Relations Department, and the Deputy General Secretary in 1987, leading to his election in 1993 as General Secretary.

=== ETUC ===
He was General Secretary of the European Trade Union Confederation, based in Brussels, between 2003 and 2011.

=== Other interests ===
Monks has also sat on numerous other bodies, including Acas from 1979 until 1995. In 2000, he agreed to chair the Co-operative Commission, reporting in 2001 with recommendations for the co-operative movement. He was also President of the British Airline Pilots Association. He was a non-executive director of Thompsons Solicitors between 2010 and 2019 and was a visiting professor at the University of Manchester. He is a vice – president of Justice for Colombia and of the Smith Institute, and President of the Involvement and Participation Association. Monks has honorary degrees from the universities of Nottingham, Salford, Manchester(UMIST), Cranfield, Cardiff, Southampton, Kingston and the Open University. He is also a Fellow of the City and Guilds of London Institute.

=== House of Lords ===
He took his seat in the House of Lords on 11 October 2010, having been created a life peer on 26 July 2010 as Baron Monks, of Blackley in the County of Greater Manchester.

In August 2014, Monks was one of 200 public figures who were signatories to a letter to The Guardian opposing Scottish independence in the run-up to September's referendum on that issue.

He was appointed a Chevalier of the Légion d'Honneur (2014).

Trade union offices
Preceded by Kenneth Graham	Deputy General Secretary of the TUC; 1987–1993	Succeeded by Brendan Barber
Preceded by Norman Willis	General Secretary of the TUC; 1993–2003	Succeeded by Brendan Barber
Preceded by Emilio Gabaglio	General Secretary of the ETUC; 2003–2011	Succeeded by Bernadette Ségol
Orders of precedence in the United Kingdom
Preceded by The Lord Browne of Ladyton	Gentlemen; Baron Monks	Followed by The Lord Hennessy of Nympsfield
