= Kenneth Graham (trade unionist) =

Kenneth Graham CBE (18 July 1922 – 15 July 2005) was a British trade union leader.

Born in Cleator—then in Cumberland—Graham studied at the Workington Technical School. He started work at 16, and immediately joined the Amalgamated Engineering Union. He studied with the London University External System, and served with the Royal Air Force during World War II. After the war, he held a variety of engineering jobs, and also worked for the Workers' Educational Association as a tutor at the University of Southampton.

Graham joined the Trades Union Congress in 1961, rising to become head of the organisation department by 1966. He was appointed as Assistant General Secretary in 1977, then as Deputy General Secretary in 1985, serving until his retirement two years later.

Trade union offices
Preceded by Norman Willis	Assistant General Secretary of the TUC; 1978–1984; With: David Lea	Succeeded by Roy Jackson and David Lea
Preceded by Norman Willis	Deputy General Secretary of the TUC; 1985–1987	Succeeded by John Monks
