= Ronald Citrine, 3rd Baron Citrine =

The Right Honourable The Lord Citrine

Personal details
- Born: 19 May 1919
- Died: 5 August 2006 (aged 87)

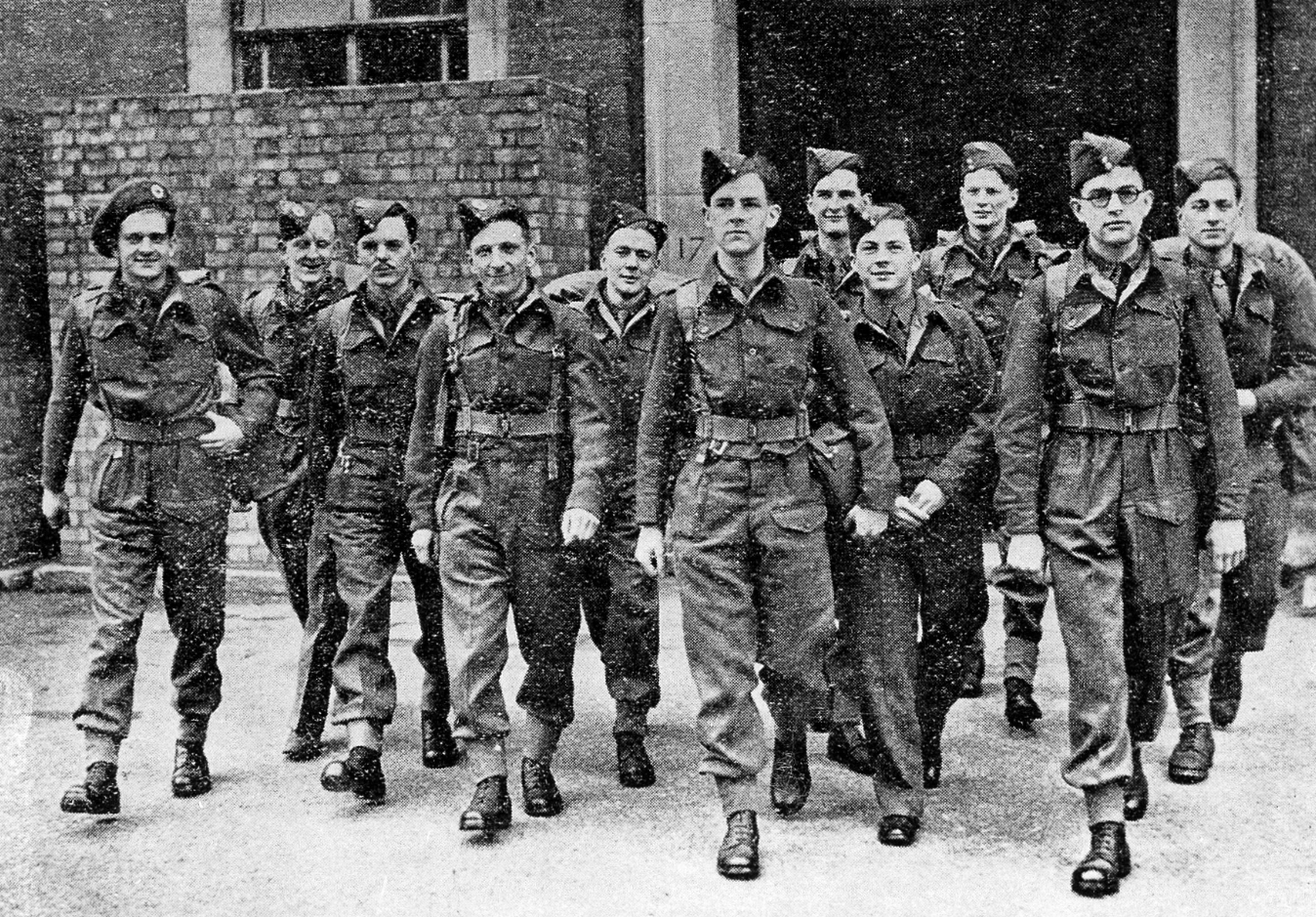
Group of Westminster hospital students who worked at Belsen

Ronald Eric Citrine, 3rd Baron Citrine of Wembley, MRCS (19 May 1919 — 5 August 2006) was one of the Westminster Hospital medical students who assisted at Bergen-Belsen concentration camp in 1945. In 1955, he registered as a medical practitioner in New Zealand and lived at Paihia.

Peerage of the United Kingdom
Preceded by Norman Arthur Citrine	Baron Citrine; 1997–2006	Extinct
