= Roy Jackson (trade unionist) =

British trade unionist

Roy Jackson (18 June 1928 – 11 December 2010) was a British trade unionist, who served as Assistant General Secretary of the Trades Union Congress (TUC).

Born in Paddington in London, Jackson was educated at North Paddington Central School. He left to work for the Post Office Savings Bank, followed by a period of National Service with the Royal Navy. When released from the Navy, he won a trade union scholarship to Ruskin College, where he studied alongside Norman Willis. He then moved on to Worcester College, Oxford where he completed a degree in philosophy, politics and economics.

Jackson next found work in the education department of the Trades Union Congress, and in 1964 became its Director of Studies. He wrote a report, "Training Shop Stewards", which became the official TUC line on the shop stewards' movement, and led to new approaches to training trade unionists. He became head of the TUC's Education Department in 1974, and in 1984 was a co-founder of the TUC National College, in Hornsey.

In 1984, Jackson was appointed as an assistant general secretary of the TUC, serving under Willis. He was involved in negotiations on issues ranging from the UK miners' strike to the expulsion of the Electrical, Electronic, Telecommunications and Plumbing Union from the TUC, and also organised a completed refurbishment of Congress House.

Jackson served on numerous other bodies, including the Manpower Services Commission, Open University Committee on Continuing Education and Schools Council Convocation. He retired from his trade union posts in 1992, following which he served on the Employment Appeal Tribunal and the board of directors of Remploy.

Trade union offices
Preceded by Denis Winnard	Secretary of the Trades Union Congress Education Department; 1974–1984	Succeeded by Alan Grant
Preceded by Kenneth Graham and David Lea	Assistant General Secretary of the Trades Union Congress; 1984–1992; With: David Lea	Succeeded by David Lea
