= Vincent Tewson =

English trade unionist

Sir Vincent Tewson CBE MC
- Born: Harold Vincent Tewson; 4 February 1898; Bradford, Yorkshire
- Died: 2 May 1981 (aged 83); Letchworth, Hertfordshire
- Occupation: Trade unionist
- Years active: 1912–1960
- Employer(s): Amalgamated Society of Dyers; Trades Union Congress
- Title: General Secretary of the Trades Union Congress
- Term: 1946–1960
- Predecessor: Walter Citrine
- Successor: George Woodcock
- Board member of: International Confederation of Free Trade Unions; Independent Television Authority
- Military career
- Allegiance: United Kingdom
- Branch: British Army
- Service years: 1917–1919
- Rank: Lieutenant
- Unit: West Yorkshire Regiment
- Conflicts: World War I • Western Front
- Awards: Military Cross

Sir Harold Vincent Tewson CBE MC (4 February 1898 – 1 May 1981) was an English trade unionist who served as General Secretary of the Trades Union Congress (TUC) from 1946 to 1960.

== Biography ==
Harold Vincent Tewson was born in Bradford, Yorkshire. After leaving school at the age of 14, he began working in the office of the Amalgamated Society of Dyers, Finishers and Kindred Trades.

He served in the Army during World War I, being commissioned as a second lieutenant in the West Yorkshire Regiment on 1 August 1917. On 4 February 1918 he was awarded the Military Cross, which was gazetted on 2 July. His citation read:

2nd Lieutenant Harold Vincent Tewson, West Yorkshire Regiment.

"For conspicuous gallantry and devotion to duty. When his men came under very severe machine-gun fire he dashed in front, and so encouraged them by his fearless example that they drove the enemy back and captured the objective. When the fire became so heavy that a gap was caused on his flank, he ran along the front of the line, rallied the men and formed a defensive flank, thus saving a critical situation."

On 1 February 1919 Tewson was promoted to lieutenant in the 5th Battalion of the West Yorkshires.

After the war, Tewson returned to Bradford to work for the Dyers Union. He became involved with the Independent Labour Party, and, aged 25, became the youngest member of Bradford City Council. He joined the TUC in 1925, as Organization Secretary, and was appointed Assistant General Secretary in 1931.

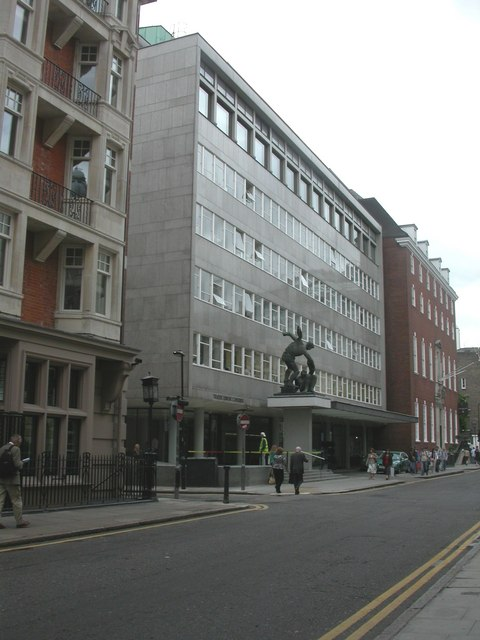
Congress House, the TUC headquarters which was inaugurated in 1958, while Tewson was general secretary

In the late 1930s, during the Spanish Civil War, Tewson was active in the Aid Spain Movement, serving as Vice-Chairman of the Basque Children's Committee, an offshoot of the National Joint Committee for Spanish Relief, founded to care for the nearly 4,000 Basque children evacuated to the UK on the ship Habana in May 1937. He and his wife also organised a committee in Barnet that involved 40 organisations, including "three churches, each political party, the Odd Fellows, the British Legion and several others", all of which agreed to support individual Basque children financially, and the Tewsons helped to run the Barnet home until 1946. He was made a Commander of the Order of the British Empire in June 1942.

Tewson succeeded Walter Citrine as General Secretary of the TUC in 1946, supporting the post-war economic recovery of Europe, and assisting in creating a trades union advisory Committee for the Marshall Plan. In 1949 he was the secretary of the conference at Geneva during which the International Confederation of Free Trade Unions (ICFTU) was created, and served as its President from 1951 to 1953. He was knighted on 14 March 1950. Tewson retired as General Secretary in 1960, and in November of that year was appointed a part-time member of the London Electricity Board. In 1964 he was appointed a member of the Independent Television Authority.

He died in Letchworth, Hertfordshire in 1981.

His son Peter Tewson (b.1944) attended Queen Elizabeth's Grammar School, Barnet.

Trade union offices
Preceded by Alec Firth	Assistant General Secretary of the TUC; 1931–1946	Succeeded by George Woodcock
Preceded by Walter Citrine	General Secretary of the TUC; 1946–1960	Succeeded by George Woodcock
