= Baron Citrine =

Extinct barony in the Peerage of the United Kingdom

Baron Citrine, of Wembley in the County of Middlesex, was a title in the Peerage of the United Kingdom. It was created in 1946 for the prominent trade unionist Sir Walter Citrine. He was General Secretary of the TUC from 1925 to 1946. The title became extinct on the death of his younger son, the third Baron (who had succeeded his elder brother in 1997), in 2006.

== Barons Citrine (1946) ==
- Walter McLennan Citrine, 1st Baron Citrine (1887–1983)
- Norman Arthur Citrine, 2nd Baron Citrine (1914–1997)
- Ronald Eric Citrine, 3rd Baron Citrine (1919–2006)
