= General Secretary of the Trades Union Congress =

British trade union federation official

The General Secretary of the TUC is the chief permanent officer of the Trades Union Congress, and a major figurehead in the trade union movement in the United Kingdom.

The Secretary is responsible for the effective operation of the TUC and for leading implementation of policies set by the annual Congress and the organisation's General Council. They also serve as the TUC's chief representative, both with the public and with other organisations.

The position was formed in 1921, when the Parliamentary Committee of the TUC became the General Council. The position of Secretary has been a permanent, full-time position in the TUC since 1904. Before that, the Secretary was elected annually at Congress.

Between January 2013 and December 2022, the incumbent position was held by Frances O'Grady, the first woman to hold the post. O'Grady was succeeded by the current General Secretary, Paul Nowak – the Deputy General Secretary during O'Grady's leadership – on 29 December 2022.

== Secretaries of the Parliamentary Committee of the TUC ==
- William Henry Wood (1868–1869)
- George Potter (1869–1872)
- George Odger (1872–1873)
- George Howell (1873–1876)
- Henry Broadhurst (1876–1885)
- George Shipton (1885–1886)
- Henry Broadhurst (1886–1890)
- Charles Fenwick (1890–1894)
- Sam Woods (1894–1905)
- W. C. Steadman (1905–1911)
- C. W. Bowerman (1911–1921)

== General Secretaries of the TUC ==
Status

Denotes Acting General Secretary

Portrait	Name (Birth–Death)	Term of office		Union	Honour(s)
	C. W. Bowerman (1851–1947)	10 September 1921	8 September 1923		
	Fred Bramley (1874–1925)	8 September 1923	10 October 1925 (Died in Office)		
	Walter Citrine (1887–1983)	10 October 1925	11 September 1926		Knighted in 1935; Baron Citrine in 1946
	Walter Citrine (1887–1983)	11 September 1926	21 October 1946		Knighted in 1935; Baron Citrine in 1946
	Vincent Tewson (1898–1981)	21 October 1946	6 September 1960		Knighted in 1950
	George Woodcock (1904–1979)	6 September 1960	26 February 1969		
	Vic Feather (1908–1976)	26 February 1969	2 September 1969		Baron Feather for Life in 1974
	Vic Feather (1908–1976)	2 September 1969	7 September 1973		Baron Feather for Life in 1974
	Len Murray (1922–2004)	7 September 1973	7 September 1984		Baron Murray of Epping Forest for Life in 1975
	Norman Willis (1933–2014)	7 September 1984	10 September 1993		
	John Monks (1945–)	10 September 1993	29 May 2003		Baron Monks for Life in 2010
	Brendan Barber (1951–)	29 May 2003	31 December 2012		Knighted in 2013; Brendan Barber, Baron Barber of Ainsdale for life in 2025
	Frances O'Grady (1959–)	1 January 2013	29 December 2022		Baroness O'Grady of Upper Holloway for Life in 2022
	Paul Nowak (1972–)	29 December 2022	Present		

== Deputy General Secretaries of the TUC ==
1977: Norman Willis
1985: Kenneth Graham
1987: John Monks
1993: Brendan Barber
2003: Frances O'Grady
2013: Post vacant
2016: Paul Nowak
2022: Post vacant

== Assistant General Secretaries of the TUC ==
1917: Fred Bramley
1924: Walter Citrine
1926: Alec Firth
1931: Vincent Tewson
1947: George Woodcock
1960: Vic Feather
1969: Len Murray
1973: Norman Willis
1978: Kenneth Graham and David Lea
1985: Roy Jackson and David Lea
1992: David Lea
1999: Post vacant
2003: Kay Carberry
2013: Kay Carberry and Paul Nowak
2016: Post vacant
2022: Kate Bell

== See also ==
- President of the Trades Union Congress
