= ABC of Chairmanship =

A.B.C. of Chairmanship
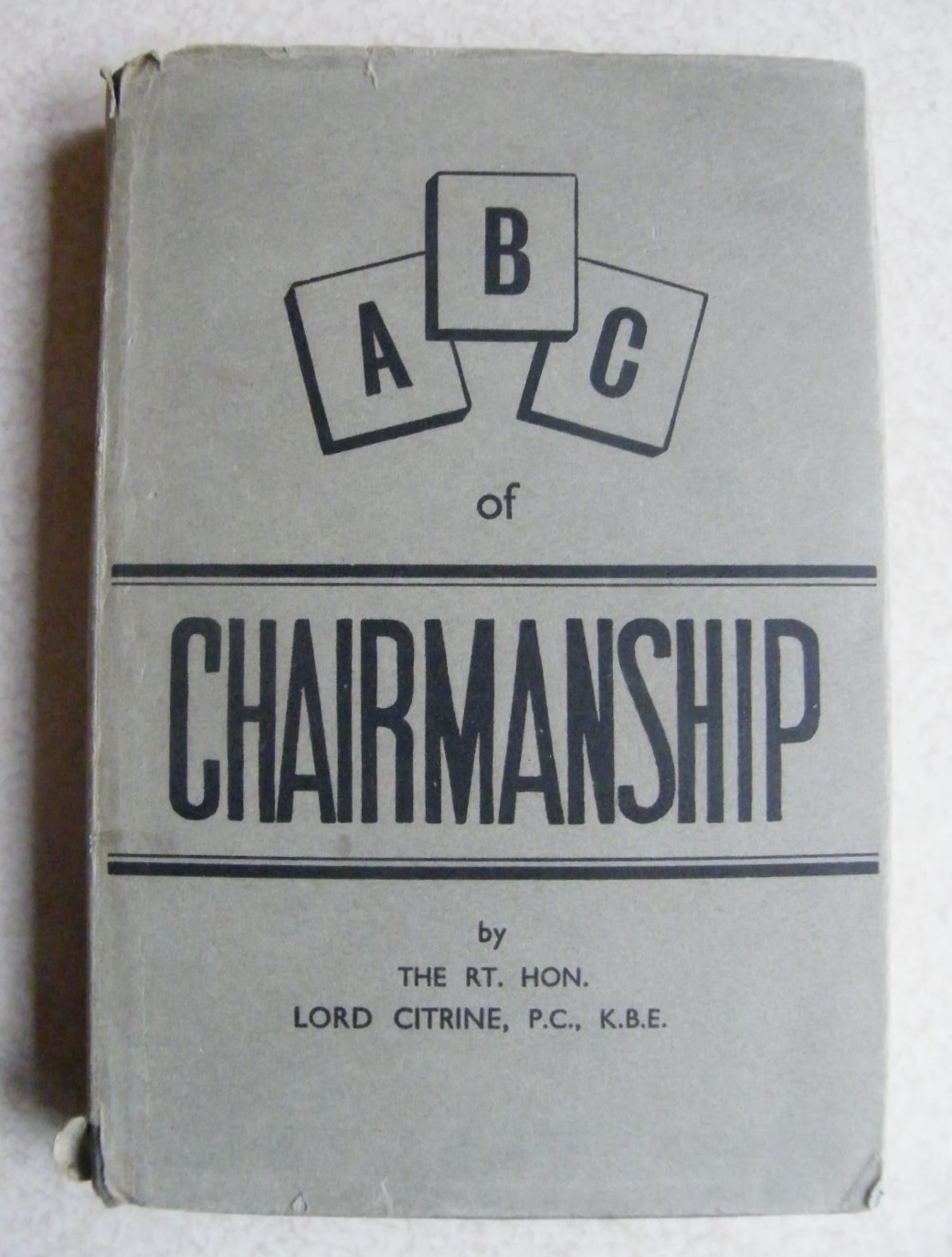
- ABC of Chairmanship
- Author: Walter Citrine, 1st Baron Citrine
- Language: English
- Subject: Management
- Publisher: NCLC Publishing Society Limited
- Publication date: 1939
- Publication place: UK
- Media type: Hardcover
- Pages: 284 pp

A.B.C. of Chairmanship by Walter Citrine is considered by many in the Labour and Union movements of the UK to be the definitive book on how meetings should be run and how committees should be managed. It originated as notes for Electrical Trades Union (ETU) activists in the Merseyside area of the UK – they had Liverpool, Birkenhead and Bootle branches – in the 1910s by Citrine who was then chairman of their district committee.

== Introduction ==
Citrine had devised the notes, based on parliamentary rules of debate, to ensure the efficient and orderly conduct of the business. The ETU adopted them nationally in its Rule Book in 1914. Over the years, they were revised and adapted to changing circumstances in a union which grew vastly during World War one.

== Description ==
In 1920, Citrine, who had stood as a Labour parliamentary candidate for the Wallasey seat in the 1918 general election and was encouraged to produce an expanded version of this guide for other unions and the Labour Party, entitled The Labour Chairman. This was published with an introduction by a leading National Union of Railwaymen and TUC figure of that time, J. H. (‘Jimmy’) Thomas. It had considerable influence and became an authoritative source of rulings on all procedural aspects of the conduct of meetings from branch to national levels.

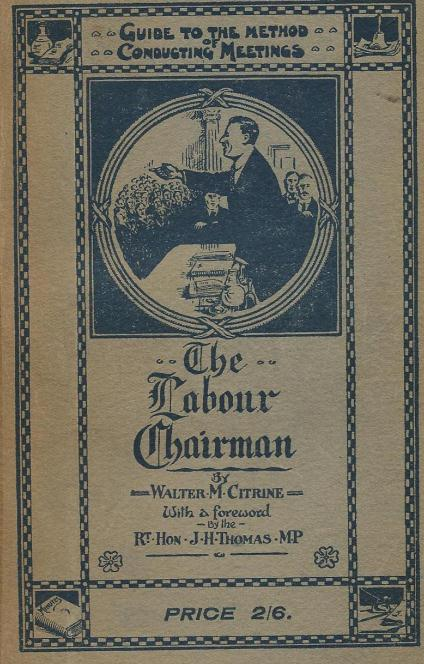
The Labour Chairman book cover from 1920

It was this book, later updated by Citrine, which was published by the Fabian Society, co-operative society, NCLC and many unions as The ABC of Chairmanship from 1939 onwards. New editions were published regularly until the 1980s. Alan Johnson MP, former General Secretary of the Communication Workers Union and Home Secretary described Citrine (as it is generally called), as his and all his colleagues’ key guide.
