= David Lea, Baron Lea of Crondall =

British politician (born 1937)

The Right Honourable The Lord Lea of Crondall OBE

Member of the House of Lords
- Lord Temporal
- Life peerage 20 July 1999 – 7 April 2022

Personal details
- Born: David Edward Lea; 2 November 1937 (age 88) Tyldesley, Lancashire
- Party: Labour (1999−2020); Non-affiliated (2020−2022)
- Education: Farnham Grammar School; Christ's College, Cambridge

David Edward Lea, Baron Lea of Crondall, OBE (born 2 November 1937) is a British former trade unionist and Labour politician.

== Early life ==
Lea was educated at Farnham Grammar School and Christ's College, Cambridge, where he studied economics.

== Trade union career ==
Lea joined the TUC in 1964 as a research officer, became Head of the Economic Department, then Assistant General Secretary from 1978 until 1999, when he joined the House of Lords.

Whilst at the TUC, he was secretary of the TUC-Labour Party Liaison Committee from 1972 to 1994, a member of the Royal Commission on the Distribution of Income and Wealth from 1974 until 1979, the Delors Committee on Economic and Social Concepts in the Community 1977 to 1979, the Kreisky Commission on Unemployment in Europe 1986–89, a member of the Working Party on Economic and Social Concepts in the EEC and a Vice President of the European TUC.

== House of Lords ==
Appointed an Officer of the Order of the British Empire (OBE) in the 1978 New Year Honours, Lea was made a Labour Life peer taking the title Baron Lea of Crondall, of Crondall in the County of Hampshire on 20 July 1999.

Lord Lea made headlines in April 2013 when he publicly claimed that fellow peer and former MI6 officer Daphne Park admitted to him shortly before her death that the MI6 had had a role in the 1961 abduction and murder of Congolese leader Patrice Lumumba.

On 14 January 2020, the House of Lords Commissioner for Standards published a report detailing a number of complaints regarding Lord Lea's behaviour. The behaviour, described as "stalkerish" by one of the complainants, was deemed to amount to harassment based on age and sex in the eyes of the commissioner. As a result of these findings Lord Lea was suspended from the Labour Peers Group. A further report on the behaviour of Lord Lea was published on 10 August 2020.

Lord Lea resigned from the House of Lords on 7 April 2022.

Trade union offices
Preceded by Norman Willis	Assistant General Secretary of the TUC; 1978–1999; With: Kenneth Graham (1978–1984); Roy Jackson (1984–1992)	Vacant Title next held by Kay Carberry
Orders of precedence in the United Kingdom
Preceded by The Lord Foster of Thames Bank	Gentlemen; Baron Lea of Crondall	Followed by The Lord Rennard
