= Brendan Barber =

British trade union official (born 1951)

The Right Honourable The Lord Barber of Ainsdale
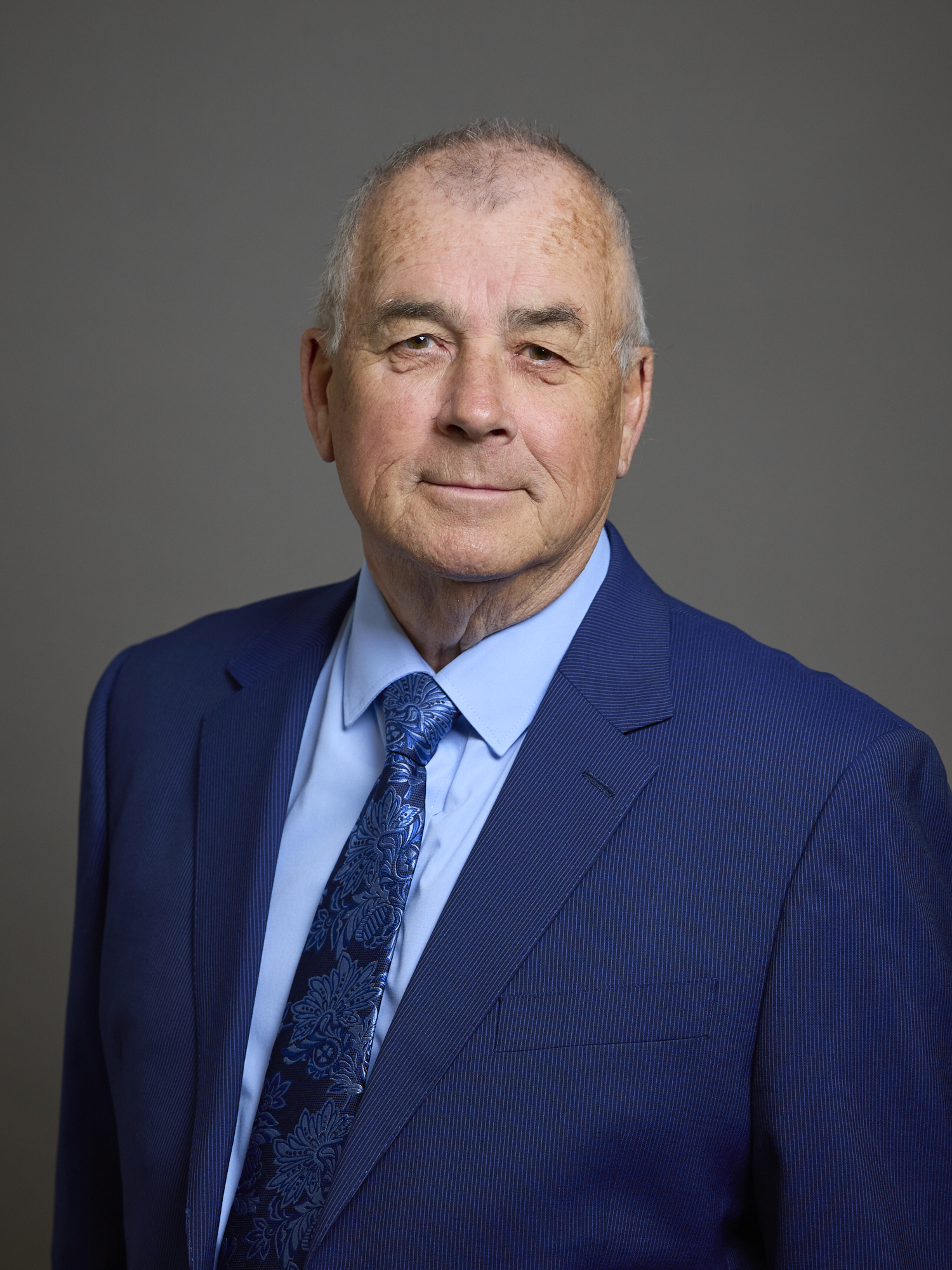
- Official portrait, 2025

Chair of the Advisory, Conciliation and Arbitration Service
- In office 2014–2020
- Minister: Vince Cable; Sajid Javid; Greg Clark; Andrea Leadsom; Alok Sharma; Kwasi Kwarteng; Jacob Rees-Mogg
- Preceded by: Ed Sweeney
- Succeeded by: Claire Chapman

10th General Secretary of the Trades Union Congress
- In office 2003–2012
- Preceded by: John Monks
- Succeeded by: Frances O'Grady

Deputy General Secretary of the Trades Union Congress
- In office 1993–2003
- Preceded by: John Monks
- Succeeded by: Frances O'Grady

Member of the House of Lords
- Lord Temporal
- Life peerage 20 January 2025

Personal details
- Born: Brendan Paul Barber; 3 April 1951 (age 75) Southport, England
- Party: Labour
- Education: City, University of London

Brendan Paul Barber, Baron Barber of Ainsdale (born 3 April 1951) is a British trade union official and life peer. He served as chair of the Advisory, Conciliation and Arbitration Service (ACAS) Council until 2020. He is a former general secretary of the United Kingdom's Trades Union Congress (TUC); a post he held from June 2003 until his retirement at the end of 2012. He was appointed Acas Chair in 2014, replacing Ed Sweeney, who had been in the post since 2007. He also serves on the board of the Banking Standards Board (since 2015), the Board of Transport for London (2013–), the board of Britain Stronger in Europe (since 2015), the Council of City University, London and the board of Mountview Academy of Theatre Arts (since 2014).

== Early life and education ==
Barber was born on 3 April 1951 in Southport, Lancashire, and educated at St Mary's College, Sefton (then a direct grant grammar school). Between school and university, he spent a year with VSO teaching in the Volta Region of Ghana. At City, University of London, he earned a Bachelor of Arts (BA) degree in social sciences in 1974, then spent the next year as the president of the students' union.

== Career ==
He spent a year as a researcher for the Ceramics, Glass and Mineral Products Industry Training Board based in Harrow.

=== Trades Union Congress ===
In 1975. he began working at the TUC as a policy officer. In 1979, he became the head of the TUC's Press and Information Department. In 1987, he became head of the Organisation and Industrial Relations Department and in 1993 he became deputy general secretary.

He became General Secretary of the TUC in June 2003. On 18 April 2012, he announced his retirement, enabling a successor to be elected in September at Trades Union Congress 2012. Frances O'Grady was elected his successor.

=== Awards ===
In 2007, Barber was given an Award of Doctor of Science honoris causa by City University London. He was knighted in the 2013 Birthday Honours for services to employment relations.

=== House of Lords ===
Barber was nominated for a life peerage by Prime Minister Keir Starmer in late 2024. He was created Baron Barber of Ainsdale, of Southport in the Metropolitan Borough of Sefton, on 20 January 2025, and was introduced to the House of Lords on 23 January.

== Personal life ==
He met Mary Gray in the TUC International Dept, and they married. They have two daughters. He supports Everton F.C. and lives in Muswell Hill.

Trade union offices
Preceded by John Monks	Deputy General Secretary of the Trades Union Congress; 1993–2003	Succeeded by Frances O'Grady
Preceded by John Monks	General Secretary of the Trades Union Congress; 2003–2012	Succeeded by Frances O'Grady
Government offices
Preceded by Ed Sweeney	Chair of Acas; 2014–2020	Succeeded by Claire Chapman
