= Norman Willis =

British trade unionist; General Secatary of the TUC (1933–2014)

President of the European Trade Union Confederation
- In office 1991–1993
- Preceded by: Ernst Breit
- Succeeded by: Fritz Verzetnitsch

General Secretary of the Trades Union Congress
- In office 7 September 1984 – 10 September 1993
- Deputy: Kenneth Graham; John Monks
- Preceded by: Len Murray
- Succeeded by: John Monks

Deputy General Secretary of the Trades Union Congress
- In office 1977–1984
- General Secretary: Len Murray
- Preceded by: new position
- Succeeded by: Kenneth Graham

Assistant General Secretary of the Trades Union Congress
- In office 1973–1977
- General Secretary: Len Murray
- Preceded by: Len Murray
- Succeeded by: David Lea

Staines Urban District Councillor
- In office 1971–1974

Personal details
- Born: 21 January 1933 Ashford, Middlesex, England
- Died: 7 June 2014 (aged 81)
- Party: Labour
- Education: Ruskin College; Oriel College, Oxford

Norman David Willis (21 January 1933 – 7 June 2014) was the General Secretary of the Trades Union Congress (TUC) in the United Kingdom from 1984 to 1993, and President of the European Trade Union Confederation (ETUC) from 1991 to 1993.

== Life ==
Willis was born in Ashford, Middlesex. He attended Ashford County Grammar School in Ashford, Middlesex, and studied at Ruskin College and Oriel College, Oxford. He was a Labour councillor on Staines UDC from 1971 to 1974.

== Career ==
=== TGWU ===
He worked for the TGWU from 1949 to 1951, before two years' National Service. From 1959 to 1970 he was the personal assistant to the General Secretary of the TGWU.

=== TUC ===
He became assistant General Secretary of the TUC in 1974. The leadership of Norman Willis from 1984 coincided in the late 1980s with a period of considerable change for the Trade Union movement in the UK: union membership was falling; the movement was facing power-limiting legislation from the Conservative government; and the Labour Party was conducting a fundamental review of its policies and the nature of its links with the unions.

== Personal life ==
He was a patron of the Embroiderers' Guild, a British embroidery organisation, and former President of the Arthur Ransome Society (TARS). He was a renowned raconteur. He married Maureen Kenning in 1963. They had a son and a daughter.

Willis died on 7 June 2014.

Trade union offices
Preceded by Len Murray	Assistant General Secretary of the TUC; 1973–1977	Succeeded by David Lea
Preceded by New position	Deputy General Secretary of the TUC; 1977–1984	Succeeded by Kenneth Graham
Preceded by Len Murray	General Secretary of the TUC; 1984–1993	Succeeded by John Monks
Preceded by Ernst Breit	President of the ETUC; 1991–1993	Succeeded by Fritz Verzetnitsch
