= Walter Citrine, 1st Baron Citrine =

British trade unionist (1887–1983)

The Right Honourable The Lord Citrine GBE PC
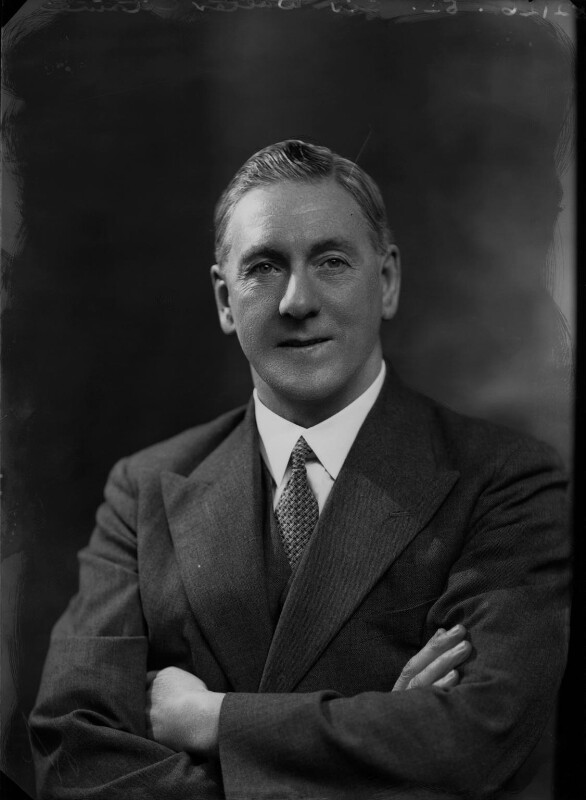
- Citrine, photographed c. 1939

Personal details
- Born: 22 August 1887 Liverpool, England
- Died: 22 January 1983 (aged 95) Brixham, Devon, England

Walter McLennan Citrine, 1st Baron Citrine, GBE, PC (22 August 1887 – 22 January 1983) was one of the leading British and international trade unionists of the twentieth century and a notable public figure. Yet, apart from his renowned guide to the conduct of meetings, ABC of Chairmanship, he has been little spoken of in the history of the labour movement. More recently, labour historians have begun to re-assess Citrine's role.

By redefining the role of the Trades Union Congress (TUC), whose general secretary he was from 1926 until 1946, he helped create a far more coherent and effective union force. This, in turn, transformed the Labour Party into a substantial social democratic force for government from 1939. Citrine was also president of the then influential International Federation of Trade Unions (IFTU) from 1928 until 1945. He was also joint secretary of the key TUC/ Labour Party National Joint Council from 1931 and a director of the UK Daily Herald newspaper until 1946 which was then a mass circulation Labour paper with considerable influence. In these important roles, Citrine was highly influential in the industrial and political wings of the labour movement. His prominent involvement helped secure its recovery after the deep crisis and crushing defeat which followed the fall of the British Labour government in 1931. In particular, he played a key role from the mid-1930s in reshaping Labour's foreign policy, especially as regards re-armament and through the all-party Anti-Nazi Council in which he worked with Winston Churchill.

Citrine strengthened the TUC's influence over the Labour Party. He opposed plans by the Labour Government in 1931 to cut unemployment benefits. After Ramsay MacDonald formed a coalition with the Conservatives to force his policies through, Citrine led the campaign to have him expelled from the party. Citrine later supported the Attlee government's policy of nationalisation and served on the National Coal Board and served as chairman of the Central Electricity Board 1947–57. He was granted a peerage in 1947.

Citrine authored ABC of Chairmanship, regarded by many in the labour movement as the "bible" of committee chairmanship. His autobiography Men and Work was published in 1964 and the second volume, Two Careers, in 1967. His personal papers are held at the London School of Economics.

In August 2025 a Blue Plaque was installed on his childhood home in Seacombe, Wirral.

== Career ==
Citrine was born to a working-class family in Liverpool, one of four sons and two daughters of Arthur Citrine (born, like his father, Francisco Citrini) and Isabella, daughter of George McLellan, of Arbroath, Scotland. His father was a ship rigger and Mersey pilot and his mother a Presbyterian hospital nurse. His grandfather Francisco Citrini came to England from Italy. Citrine referred to his father as a 'big, burly and courageous man', who 'brought all his troubles home'; in the course of his labouring he suffered a crushed hand, lost two fingers, had his knee smashed, and was shipwrecked three times. Although his son rated him highly as a father, with 'a clear intelligence and masterful personality', and 'neither cruel nor inconsiderate', he would sometimes overindulge in beer (despite 'long periods of sobriety' and general avoidance of spirits), which contributed to the family's poor financial situation. This, and the family tendency to tuberculosis (which killed his mother and many other relatives) which led to his avoidance of smoking, inspired Citrine to endeavour to lead a healthy lifestyle. In Fatherhood and the British Working Class, 1865–1914 (2015), Strange notes that, with many 'exceptional' individuals of working-class origin and 'banal beginnings', close relatives and friends are 'usually markedly more pedestrian'; in contrast with Citrine's distinguished career, his brothers were a pupil-teacher, a locksmith's apprentice, and a sheet-metal worker, and a sister was a clerk at a laundry. Strange observes none of them were prominent in 'public life at local, regional or national level'.

Although he left school at the age of 12, working in a flour mill, like many of the union leaders of those days he was an autodidact who studied electrical theory, economics and accountancy, as well as learning the relatively ornamental Gregg shorthand writing – a skill that stood him in good stead as a union official. As a member of the Independent Labour Party from 1906, he became well read in the standard socialist tracts, including Marx's works and from the 1910s Citrine was quite left-wing with mildly-syndicalist views.

Citrine joined the Electrical Trades Union (ETU) in 1911 and within a few years was the leading activist for that union in Merseyside, leading a national electrician's dispute there in 1913. He was elected as the union's first full-time District Secretary in 1914 (the year he married his wife and life-time companion, Doris), a post he served in throughout World War 1 and until 1920, gaining much experience negotiating with major employers all round Birkenhead docks as well as with electrical contractors in the area. He became secretary of the regional Federation of Engineering and Shipbuilding Trades (FEST) in 1919 and was elected as Assistant General Secretary of the ETU in 1920 at their headquarters in Manchester. In this role he transformed the union's finances with administrative changes which secured their income, creating his reputation for these unusual union skills.

In 1924, he was appointed Assistant General Secretary of the Trades Union Congress on account of his reputation for financial and administrative abilities. The TUC, though four to five million strong with over two hundred unions affiliated, had up to then been a largely ineffective body. As the general secretary, Fred Bramley, was ill, Citrine took on a much wider role from the start. In time, he would transform it into a coherent and effective lobbying organisation for a growing movement.

He acted enthusiastically as General Secretary during the General Strike of 1926 and was confirmed in that position after it, without opposition, at the Trades Union Congress of September 1926. The defeat of the general strike proved a watershed for the trade unions, persuading most General Council leaders to abandon their previous syndicalist philosophy. With other leading figures, such as Ernest Bevin (1881–1951), Citrine helped change the face of British trade unionism. They took the unions from the path of class conflict rhetoric to pragmatic cooperation with employers and government in return for union recognition and industrial advances. It was said that they took the TUC 'from Trafalgar Square to Whitehall'.

From 1928 to 1945, he was also President of the International Federation of Trade Unions, chiefly an honorific position. He was also a Director of the Daily Herald 1929–1946, the newspaper that spoke for the trades union movement.

In 1945, he attended the World Trade Union Conference in London alongside many renowned trade unionists.

Citrine declined Churchill's offer to serve in his all-Party war-time coalition government. He did accept the position of Privy Councillor and this gave him total access to the prime minister and considerable influence with all Ministers on behalf of the TUC throughout the war. Together with Bevin who became Minister of Labour and National Service, they mobilised and directed the organised working classes' enthusiastic productive effort for victory. Citrine also acted as an envoy for the prime minister with the U.S and Soviet trade unions. This major contribution to the war effort immensely strengthened the position of the Labour ministers in Churchill's government of 1940 to 1945 which greatly assisted Labour's election as a majority government in 1945. That government's radical programme had been shaped on the National Joint Council of the 1930s. With this new prestige and standing, the trade unions came to be regarded as 'an estate of the realm', by all parties.

== Feuds with communists and far-left ==
Citrine's battles with the Communist International (Comintern) and its British agents began after the 1926 general strike. The Communist Party of Great Britain (CPGB) and its front group in the unions, the Red International of Labour Unions (RILU), later the Minority Movement, blamed the TUC leadership for the defeat of the strike and attacked them viciously. In a fully-researched pamphlet, Citrine exposed that attempt by the Comintern to subvert the leaders of the British trade unions and helped to isolate British communists in the trade unions and the Labour Party.

However, Citrine had originally been a keen supporter of the Russian Revolution and trade with the Soviet Union – an admirer of what he described as Lenin's 'Electric Republic'. He was one of the first to visit the Soviet Union in 1925 and would do so again in 1935, 1941, 1943, 1945 and 1956. However, as president of the IFTU, based in Berlin from 1931 to 1936, he saw the rise of Hitler and the destruction of the huge German trade union and labour movement partly as the fault of the communists' divisive tactics. He and Bevin were determined to prevent such an occurrence in Britain which perhaps gave them a heightened sense of communist conspiracy in its dealings with internal opposition within the unions and the Labour Party. This caused much hostility in the left, such as the Socialist League, which would colour the attitude of many leftists to him thereafter. Michael Foot's biography of Aneurin Bevan is indicative of that.

Citrine wrote that his robust exposure of the Communist International and the Communist Party of Great Britain attempts to subvert British trade union leaders' authority and to capture key posts in the trade union movement drew a "campaign of calumny" against him "in which everything I did was distorted into some sinister conspiracy against the workers". One example that he gave were allegations that he had colluded with the French Labour Minister Charles Pomaret "to clamp down on French labour with a set of drastic wage-&hour decrees in 1939 and had agreed a proposal by British Chancellor of the Exchequer, Sir John Simon that pay rises in Britain be stopped." As TUC general secretary, Citrine and seven members of his General Council had gone to France to confer with its counterparts in the Confederation Generale du Travail "to secure close co-operation between the two trade union movements to prosecute the war against Hitlerism".

Only The Daily Worker (later The Morning Star), organ of the Communist Party and the Comintern, were likely to criticise them for that since they were supporting the Nazi-Soviet Pact. Citrine and his colleagues sued the Daily Worker for libel in April 1940 in a case that lasted six days, with Queen's Counsel on both sides. In finding for Citrine and the General Council, Mr Justice Stable said:

"This libel was, in my judgement, inspired in its origin, it was protracted and persistent, it was unscrupulous in its method, it was inspired from abroad, and when brought to the bar of justice, the defendant had not the courage to go into the witness-box and tell me the truth."

Citrine and his colleagues were awarded substantial damages and their costs, but they were never paid, as the Daily Worker changed publishers two days after the judgement. The TUC published the full judgement in a pamphlet by Citrine: Citrine and others v Pountney: The Daily Worker Libel Case 1940. Indicative of the inaccurate press that Citrine still receives by the left, the "malicious invention" continues to appear in articles without any reference to the real story or to Citrine's reasoned rebuttal.

== Finland ==
My Finnish Diary Citrine's favourable account of his visit to Finland during its Winter War against the Soviet Union.

Citrine was totally opposed to the Soviet incursion into Finland in late 1939 and was persuaded to join a Council of Labour delegation to Finland to report to both the Labour Party and TUC.

He visited Finland at the height of its Winter War against the Soviet Union in January 1940. He interviewed many people ranging from General Gustaf Mannerheim to Soviet prisoners. He visited the front line near the Summa sector of the Mannerheim line. He wrote a popular account of his brief visit in My Finnish Diary.

== Soviet Union ==
In October 1941 a TUC delegation under his leadership travelled on the Australian warship HMAS Norman from Iceland to the Soviet Union (Archangel) via the Arctic route. The Anglo-Soviet Trade Union Committee they established with the Soviet trade unions was part of the TUC's diplomatic efforts to cement the Anglo-Soviet alliance against the Nazis after the German invasion of Russia. The Soviet foreign secretary, Molotov, asked to meet them to press for more British assistance in the war and Citrine briefed Churchill and Eden on his return. This prior to the establishment of the Arctic convoys to supply war materials from Britain to the Soviet Union.

== Postwar ==
When the Labour Party came to power in 1945, Citrine was about to retire from the TUC but was not invited to join the government by Attlee and Bevin. In 1946, at the invitation of the Minister of Fuel and Power, Emmanuel Shinwell MP, he was invited to join the newly nationalised National Coal Board and given a welfare role for its then 700,000 or so miners (pithead baths, Summer Schools and machinery for joint consultation). He served for a year until Shinwell again recommended his appointment as Chairman of the British Electricity Authority (from 1955 the Central Electricity Authority), and in 1947, Prime Minister Attlee confirmed this 'romance' appointment for the former electrician. He served in this capacity for ten years (remaining on the Board until 1962 in a part-time capacity. In this role, he embarked on an entirely new career, hence the second volume of his memoirs title, Two Careers.

Citrine at the TUC worked with Prime Minister Clement Attlee, Foreign Minister Ernest Bevin and other Labour leaders to develop an anti-Communist foreign policy in 1945–46. He collaborated with the American Federation of Labor to strengthen non-Communist unions around the world, especially in the West Indies.

== Personal life ==
Walter Citrine married his life-time partner, Dorothy Ellen ('Doris') Slade (1892–1973) in 1914 and they had two sons. They settled in Wembley Park from 1925/6. In 1955 they were living at Dorislade 59, Royston Park Road, Hatch End (Pinner). His wife died in 1973 and Citrine later moved to Brixham in Devon. He died in 1983 at age 95. He is buried in Harrow Weald Cemetery.

He was made a Knight Commander of the Order of the British Empire (KBE) in the 1935 Birthday Honours List, made a Privy Councillor in 1940 and a peer in 1946 taking the title, Baron Citrine, of Wembley in the County of Middlesex from this long association. He was elevated to a Knight Grand Cross of the Order of the British Empire (GBE) in the 1958 Birthday Honours List.

He retired in 1946 from the TUC to become a member of the National Coal Board for a year. He then became chairman of the Central Electricity Authority from 1947 to 1957, (and a part-time board member for another five years), until he finally retired aged over seventy. On 25 January 1957, he read the address at the memorial service for his electrical colleague Dame Caroline Haslett at St Martins in the Field, alongside Norah Balls who read the lesson.

He began attending debates in the House of Lords in the 1960s and made many well-received contributions throughout that decade. In 1975, Lord Citrine made his last appearance at the rostrum of his old union, the ETU, to receive the union's highest honour, its gold badge and the huge acclaim from the delegates. In the 1960s, he published his autobiography in two volumes, Men and Work (1964) and Two Careers (1967), which demonstrate considerable writing skills, as well as being one of the best accounts of his times, based on the meticulous shorthand notes he kept as the events unfolded.

Trade union offices
Preceded by Alec Firth	Assistant General Secretary of the TUC; 1924–1925; With: Alec Firth	Succeeded by Alec Firth
Preceded by Fred Bramley	General Secretary of the TUC; 1925–1946	Succeeded by Vincent Tewson
Preceded by A. A. Purcell	President of the International Federation of Trade Unions; 1928–1945	Succeeded by Position abolished
Preceded by Herbert Elvin	Trades Union Congress representative to the American Federation of Labour; 1940	Succeeded by Edward Hough and George Walker Thomson
Preceded by New position	President of the World Federation of Trade Unions; 1945–1946	Succeeded by Arthur Deakin
Peerage of the United Kingdom
New creation	Baron Citrine; 1946–1983	Succeeded by Norman Arthur Citrine
