= Frances O'Grady, Baroness O'Grady of Upper Holloway =

British trade unionist (born 1959)

The Right Honourable The Baroness O'Grady of Upper Holloway
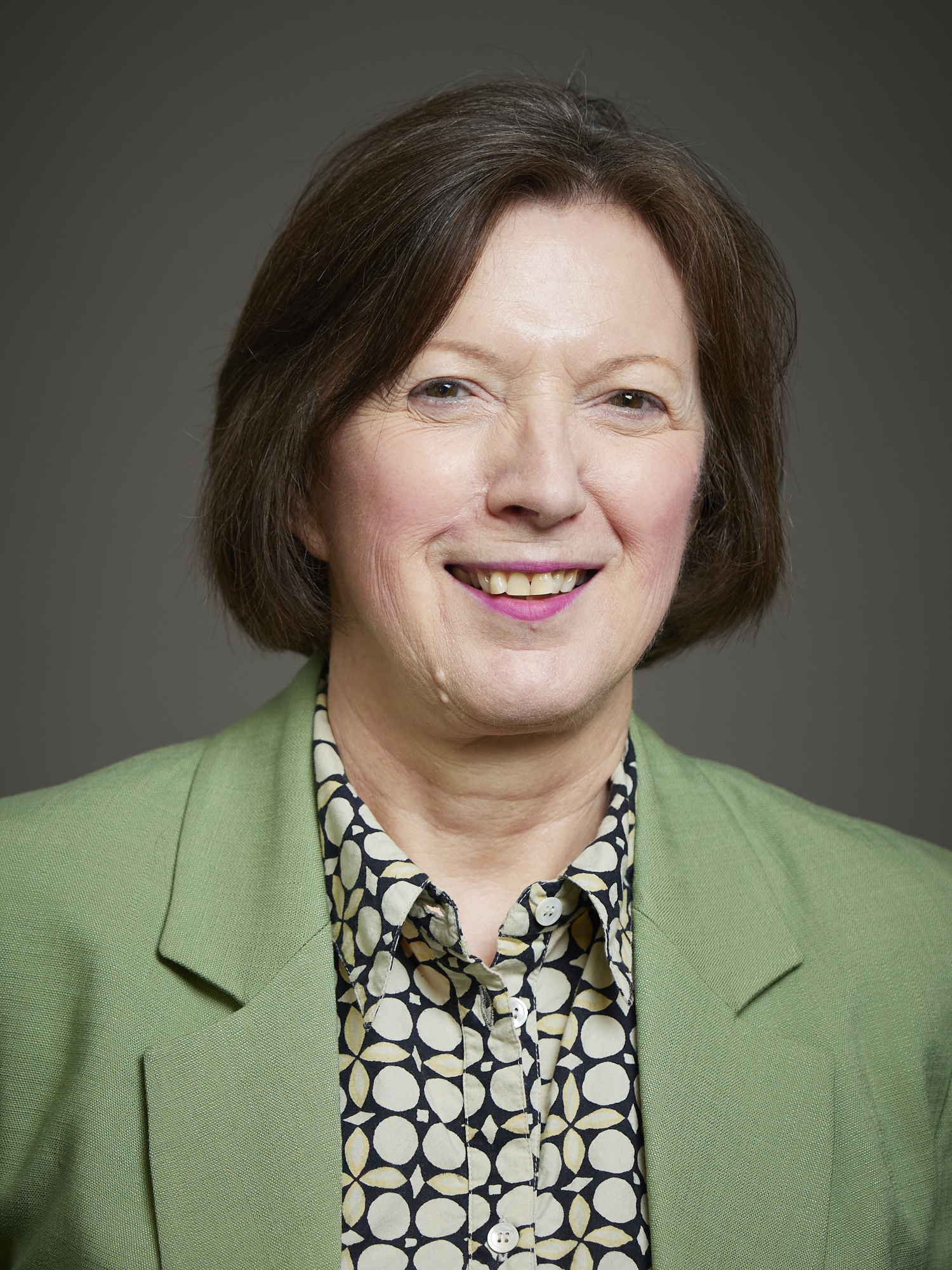
- Official portrait, 2023

General Secretary of the Trades Union Congress
- In office January 2013 – 29 December 2022
- Deputy: Paul Nowak
- Preceded by: Brendan Barber
- Succeeded by: Paul Nowak

Deputy General Secretary of the Trades Union Congress
- In office January 2003 – January 2013
- Preceded by: Brendan Barber
- Succeeded by: Paul Nowak (2016)

Member of the House of Lords
- Lord Temporal
- Life peerage 9 December 2022

Personal details
- Born: Frances Lorraine Maria O'Grady; 9 November 1959 (age 67) Oxford, England
- Party: Labour
- Education: University of Manchester (BA); Middlesex University (GrDip)

Frances Lorraine Maria O'Grady, Baroness O'Grady of Upper Holloway (born 9 November 1959) is a British former trade unionist leader, who served as the General Secretary of the British Trades Union Congress (TUC) from 2013 to 2022, being the first woman to hold the position. After O'Grady presented her resignation in 2022, Paul Nowak was selected to succeed her; he took up the post on 29 December 2022. O'Grady sits as a life peer in the House of Lords.

== Early life and family ==
O'Grady was born in Oxford, one of five siblings in a family of Irish descent, and was brought up in the Roman Catholic faith. Her father was a shop steward at the Leyland car plant in Cowley. She was educated at Milham Ford School, a grammar school which became comprehensive during her time there. At Manchester University, she earned a BA Hons in politics and modern history. She received a Diploma in Industrial Relations and Trade Union Studies at Middlesex Polytechnic.

== Career ==
O'Grady worked for the Transport and General Workers' Union, where she opposed the abolition of the Agricultural Wages Board, and campaigned for a minimum wage. She became TUC Campaigns Secretary in 1994 and founded the TUC Organising Academy in 1997, a scheme aimed at supporting a younger and more representative group of workers to become labour movement organisers.

She became head of the TUC's organisation department in 1999, and was then elected as Deputy General Secretary in 2003.

She led on the establishment of the union learning organisation unionlearn, which came into being in 2006. Unionlearn works with employers, unions and government to help around 220,000 workers per year to improve basic skills and access lifelong learning.

She became TUC General Secretary in January 2013, succeeding Brendan Barber.

In 2013, in line with the TUC, she was among those who gave their support to the People's Assembly in a letter published by The Guardian newspaper. ' She has been a member of the Resolution Foundation's Commission on Living Standards, as well as serving on the TUC's Commission on Vulnerable Employment, the Low Pay Commission and the High Pay Commission. She has campaigned prominently during the referendum on EU membership, as the TUC registered for the remain side, particularly citing concerns around the impact on workers' rights and jobs in export led industries.

O'Grady has led a protest outside Bestway, Britain's largest family owned business. In February 2013 she was, as a result of her efforts, assessed as the 11th most powerful woman in Britain by Woman's Hour on BBC Radio 4.

She was appointed as a Non-Executive Director of Bank of England in June 2019. In April 2022, O'Grady announced that she would leave her post as TUC's general secretary at the end of the year. She was succeeded by Paul Nowak in January 2023.

It was announced on 14 October 2022, that as part of the 2022 Special Honours, O'Grady would receive a life peerage, sitting for the Labour Party. On 9 December 2022, she was created Baroness O'Grady of Upper Holloway, of Wood Farm in the City of Oxford.

== Personal life ==
O'Grady has two adult children, whom she raised as a working single parent, and currently lives in London.

Trade union offices
Preceded by Brendan Barber	Deputy General Secretary of the Trades Union Congress; 2003–2012	Succeeded by Paul Nowak
Preceded by Brendan Barber	General Secretary of the Trades Union Congress; 2013–2022	Succeeded by Paul Nowak
