= Paul Nowak (trade unionist) =

British trade union official (born 1972)

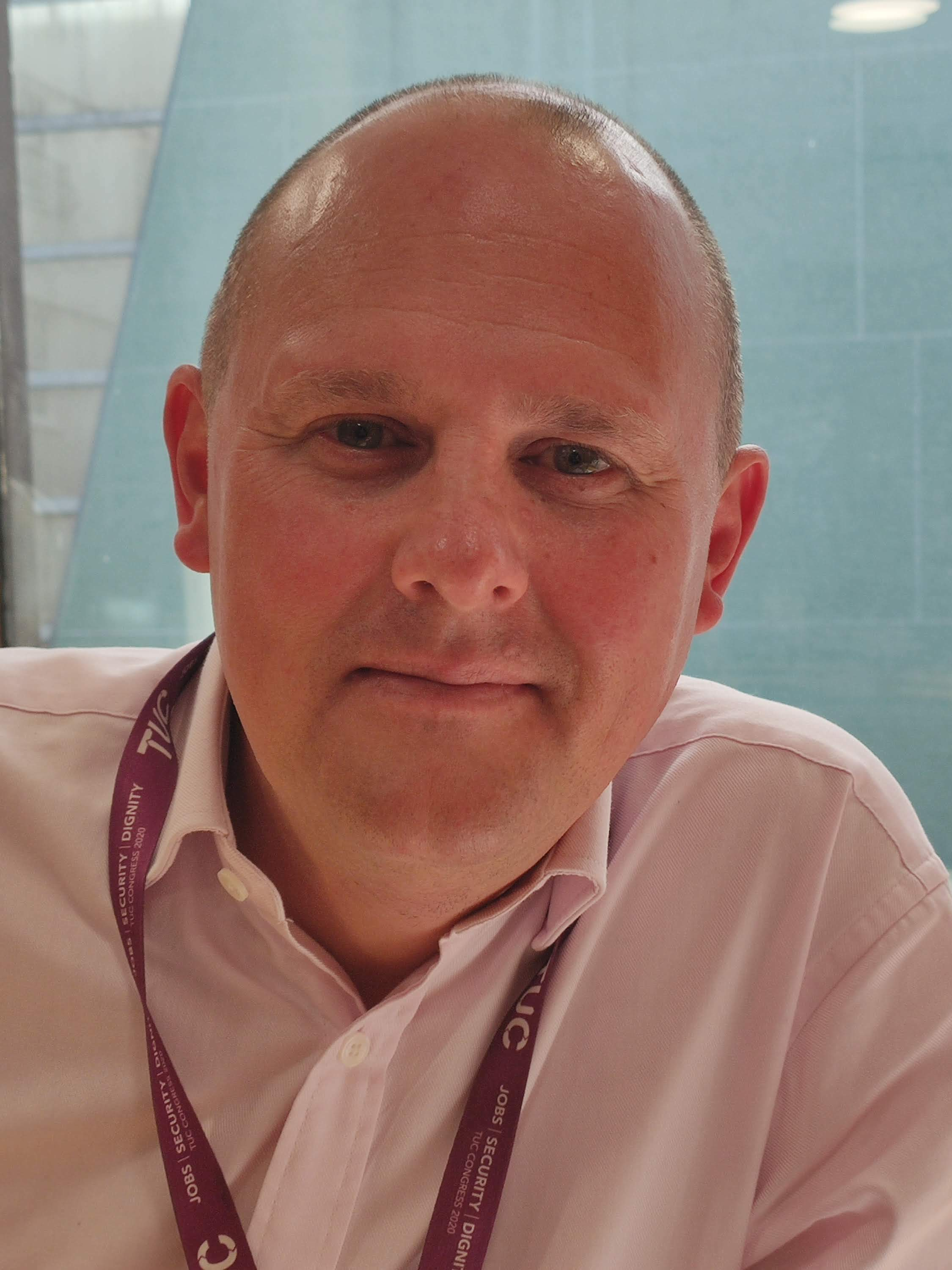
- Nowak in 2022

General Secretary of the Trades Union Congress
- Incumbent
- Assumed office 29 December 2022
- Deputy: Kate Bell
- Preceded by: The Baroness O'Grady of Upper Holloway

Deputy General Secretary of the Trades Union Congress
- In office 2016 – 29 December 2022
- General Secretary: Baroness O'Grady of Upper Holloway
- Preceded by: Frances O'Grady (2013)

Personal details
- Born: May 1972 (age 54) Bebington, England
- From 2013 to 2016, Nowak held the position of Assistant General Secretary.

Paul Nowak (born May 1972) is a British trade unionist. He has been the general secretary of the Trades Union Congress (TUC) since 29 December 2022. He was previously the deputy general secretary of the TUC.

On the 16th September 2026, the Bank of England and the Chancellor of the Exchequer announced Nowak's appointment as a non-executive director to the Bank's Court of Directors, alongside David Craig and Hanneke Smits. Nowak and Craig are both appointed to a four-year term up to 31st August 2030, while Smits is appointed from the 1st January 2027 to the 31st December 2030.

== Early life ==
Born in Bebington, Merseyside, Nowak first joined a trade union at age 17 when he had a part-time job at Asda. He subsequently became an activist in the Communication Workers Union. He became Vice President of the Wirral Trades Union Council at the age of 19 – the youngest person to hold the post.

== Trades Union Congress ==
He began working for the TUC in 2000. In 2013 he was named TUC Assistant General Secretary, and in 2016 Deputy General Secretary.

He is credited with ensuring that the Department for Business, Energy and Industrial Strategy (BEIS) guidance for safe working during the pandemic was significantly stronger than that first proposed by ministers. He supported the then TUC General Secretary Frances O'Grady in securing the Job Retention Scheme.

In July 2022, the TUC announced Nowak as its next General Secretary, taking office in January 2023. As leader of the TUC, Nowak advocates for "the closest possible economic and political relationship with the European Union", including rejoining the EU Customs Union.

== Personal life ==
Nowak is a lifelong supporter of Everton Football Club. He and his wife, Vicky, have three children.

Trade union offices
Preceded by Kay Carberry	Assistant General Secretary of the Trades Union Congress; 2013–2016; With: Kay Carberry	Vacant Title next held by Kate Bell
Vacant Title last held by Frances O'Grady	Deputy General Secretary of the Trades Union Congress; 2016–2022	Vacant
Preceded by The Baroness O'Grady of Upper Holloway	General Secretary of the Trades Union Congress; 2022–present	Incumbent
