= Trades Union Congress =

Trade union centre in England and Wales

- Abbreviation: TUC
- Founded: 1868 at Mechanics' Institute, Manchester
- Headquarters: Congress House, London, WC1
- Location(s): England and Wales
- Members: 5.3 million (2026)
- General Secretary: Paul Nowak
- Affiliations: ITUC
- Website: www.tuc.org.uk

The Trades Union Congress (TUC) is a national trade union centre, a federation of trade unions that collectively represent most unionised workers in England and Wales. There are 47 affiliated unions with a total of about 5.3 million members. Paul Nowak is the TUC's current General Secretary, serving from January 2023.

== Organisation ==
The TUC's decision-making body is the Annual Congress, which takes place in September. Between Congresses, decisions are made by the General Council, which meets every two months. The General Council appoints an Executive Committee from amongst its members.

An affiliated union can send delegates to Congress, with the number of delegates proportionate to the union's size. Each year Congress elects a TUC President, who carries out the duties of the office for the rest of the year, and then presides over the following year's Congress.

The TUC is not affiliated with the Labour Party. At election time the TUC cannot endorse a particular party by name. However it can point to policies that it believes would be positive for workers' rights, social cohesion, or community welfare. It can also campaign against policies it believes would be injurious to workers.

The TUC runs the Tolpuddle Martyrs Museum and annual Tolpuddle Martyrs' Festival and Rally commemorating the martyrs and their impact on trade unionism.

The TUC Library preserves documents related to labour history in Britain and other countries, especially Europe and the Commonwealth. The library was established in 1922. In the early 21st century it began to focus on expanding its online and digital collections.

TUC archives are held at the Modern Records Centre at the University of Warwick Library. The archives contain over a century's worth of files, including correspondence, internal and external documents, minutes, reports, printed material and press statements.

== Campaigns ==
The TUC campaigns on a wide range of issues relating to the experience of people at work.

The TUC succeeded in forcing Sports Direct to undergo an independent review into their treatment of workers in September 2016.

In October 2016, the TUC's campaign against the Trade Union Act 2016 won 'Best Public Affairs Campaign' at the PR Week Awards.

In August 2022, the TUC declared its support for a £15 an hour minimum wage, which it says should be implemented "as soon as possible".

=== Key achievements ===
- In 1970 the Equal Pay Act made it illegal for employers to give a female worker different pay and conditions to a male one doing work of equal value.
- In 1999 the National Minimum Wage was established to protect low-paid workers.
- In 1999 a limit was placed on working hours, largely as a health and safety measure. This was quickly followed by a minimum holiday entitlement.
- In 2007 the no-smoking ban was introduced in public areas in response to union arguments that workers were risking their health.
- In October 2011 agency workers gained the right to receive the same treatment as permanent staff carrying out the same work.

== History ==
=== 19th century ===
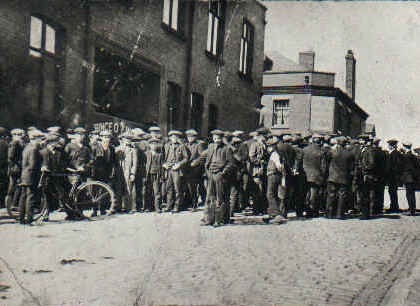
Tyldesley miners outside the Miners Hall during the 1926 general strike

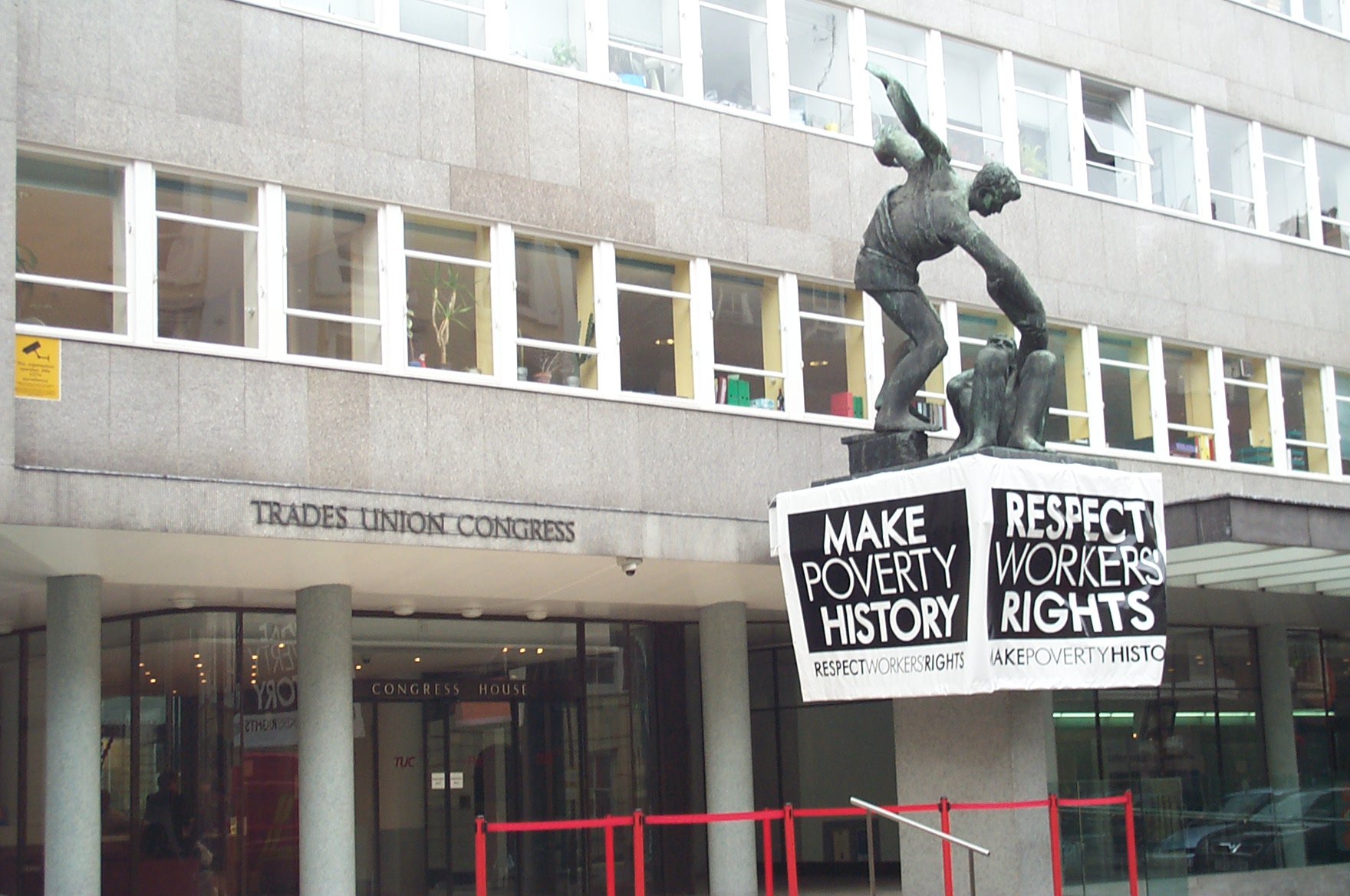
Make Poverty History banner in front of Congress House

The TUC was founded in the 1860s. The United Kingdom Alliance of Organised Trades, founded in Sheffield, Yorkshire, in 1866, was the immediate forerunner of the TUC, although efforts to expand local unions into regional or national organisations date back at least forty years earlier; in 1822, John Gast formed a "Committee of the Useful Classes", sometimes described as an early national trades council.

The first TUC meeting was held in 1868 when the Manchester and Salford Trades Council convened the founding meeting in the Manchester Mechanics' Institute (on what is now Princess Street and was then David Street; the building is at no. 103). The fact that the TUC was formed by Northern Trades Councils was not coincidental. One of the issues which prompted this initiative was the perception that the London Trades Council (formed in 1860 and including, because of its location, many of the most prominent union leaders of the day) was taking a dominant role in speaking for the Trade Union Movement as a whole. The second TUC meeting took place in 1869 at the Oddfellows Hall, Temple Street, Birmingham where delegates discussed the eight-hour working day, election of working people to Parliament and the issue of free education.

Arising out of the 1897 Congress, a decision was taken to form a more centralised trade union structure that would enable a more militant approach to be taken to fighting the employer and even achieving the socialist transformation of society. The result was the General Federation of Trade Unions which was formed in 1899. For some years it was unclear which body (the GFTU or the TUC) would emerge as the national trade union centre for the UK and for a while both were recognised as such by different fraternal organisations in other countries. However, it was soon agreed among the major unions that the TUC should take the leading role and that this would be the central body of the organised Labour Movement in the UK. The GFTU continued in existence and remains to this day as a federation of (smaller, often craft-based) trade unions providing common services and facilities to its members (especially education and training services).

As the TUC expanded and formalised its role as the "General Staff of the Labour Movement" it incorporated the Trades Councils who had given birth to it, eventually becoming the body which authorised these local arms of the TUC to speak on behalf of the wider Trade Union Movement at local and County level. Also, as the TUC became increasingly bureaucratised, the Trades Councils (often led by militant and communist-influenced lay activists) found themselves being subject to political restrictions and purges (particularly during various anti-communist witch-hunts) and to having their role downplayed and marginalised. In some areas (especially in London and the South East) the Regional Councils of the TUC (dominated by paid officials of the unions) effectively took over the role of the County Associations of Trades Councils and these paid officials replaced elected lay-members as the spokespersons for the Trade Union Movement at County and Regional level. By the end of the 20th century local Trades Councils and County Associations of Trades Councils had become so ineffective and weak that many had simply faded into effective dissolution.

The 1899 Congress saw a motion "calling for a special conference to establish a voice for working people within parliament. Within the year the conference had been held and the Labour Representation Committee established (the forerunner of the Labour Party)." The major TUC affiliated unions still make up the great bulk of the British Labour Party affiliated membership, but there is no formal/organisational link between the TUC and the party.

The Scottish Trades Union Congress, which was formed in 1897, is a separate and autonomous organisation.

=== 20th century ===
The Parliamentary Committee grew slowly, confining itself to legal matters, and ignored industrial disputes. In 1916 Harry Gosling proposed that organised labour needed an administrative machine. Following the railway strike of 1919, Ernest Bevin and G. D. H. Cole proposed a new system. The Parliamentary Committee became the General Council, representing thirty groups of workers. The General Secretary of the Trades Union Congress became chief permanent officer of the TUC, and a major figure in the British trade union movement. The system was successfully implemented by Fred Bramley and Walter Citrine. By 1927 the TUC had the making of a trade union bureaucracy similar to the civil service.

During the First World War, the Trades Union Congress generally supported the aims of the British Empire. However, in 1915, national conference voted against the introduction of military conscription.

The TUC played a major role in the General Strike of 1926, initially supporting it but then calling it off unconditionally, without input from those striking or winning any guarantees or improvements, leading to criticism and feelings of betrayal from workers and weakened unions with reduced membership numbers, as well as victimization of the strikers as they returned to work.

The TUC became increasingly affiliated with the Labour Party in the 1930s, securing seven of the thirteen available seats on the newly created National Council of Labour in 1934. The TUC pressured the Labour Party into rejecting Ramsay MacDonald's National Government formed to implement spending cuts, and no major trade unions joined his breakaway National Labour Organisation.

A TUC survey of local trades councils who were approached by unemployed marchers for support in 1936 shows widespread support for unemployed workers' protest marches among the local trade union activists. The TUC leadership subsequently tried to distort the result of the survey to justify its own opposition toward unauthorised marches.

In 1945, the World Trade Union Conference took place in February at County Hall, London, before the first World Trade Union Congress was convened in Paris, October of the same year.

In 1958, the TUC's current headquarters, Congress House, was built. It was proposed at the 1944 Congress in Blackpool as a tribute to the lives of trade unionists that were lost in World War II. The idea was quickly expanded on to include conference and meeting facilities now known as Congress Centre. The building was also seen as an opportunity to raise interest in arts and culture, architecture in particular and the chance to design the building was left open to the public as a competition, which David Du R Aberdeen won. From 1979 to the end of the 20th century, the TUC's membership declined from about 12 million to about 6.6 million. This took place during and after the Premiership of Margaret Thatcher, among other contributing factors.

=== 21st century ===
Frances O'Grady was elected leader of the TUC in 2012. The TUC endorsed a remain vote at the 2016 European Union membership referendum, and O'Grady participated in a televised debate.

In August 2022, the TUC declared its support for a £15-an-hour minimum wage.

== See also ==
- Scottish Trades Union Congress
- Irish Congress of Trade Unions
- List of trade unions in the United Kingdom
- Labour Research Department
- Unity Trust Bank
- Durham Miners' Gala
- Congress House

== Bibliography ==
- Allen, V L. "The Re-Organization of the Trades Union Congress, 1918–1927," British Journal of Sociology (1960) 11#1 pp 14–43. in JSTOR
- Clegg, Hugh Armstrong, Alan Fox, and A.F. Thompson. A History of British Trade Unions since 1889, vol. 1, 1889–1910 (Clarendon Press, 1964)
- Clegg, H.A. et al. A History of British Trade Unions Since 1889 (1964); A History of British Trade Unions Since 1889: vol. 2 1911–1933. (1985); A History of British Trade Unionism Since 1889, vol. 3: 1934–51 (1994), The major scholarly history; highly detailed. vol 1 online also vol 2 online; also vol 3 online
- Davis, W J. The British Trades Union Congress: History and Recollections (2 vols, 1910–16; reprint Garland, 1984) online
- Dorfman, Gerald A. British Trade Unionism against the Trades Union Congress (London: Macmillan, 1983) online
- Lovell, John, and B C. Roberts. A Short History of the T.U.C. (London: Macmillan, 1968) online
- Martin, Ross M. TUC: The Growth of a Pressure Group 1868–1976 (Oxford: Clarendon Press, 1980) online
- Musson, A. E. Trade Union and Social History (London: Cass, 1974)
- Renshaw, Patrick. "The Origins of The Trades Union Congress" History Today (July 1968), Vol. 18 Issue 7, pp 456–463; online' covers 1840 to 1868.
- Roberts, B C. The Trades Union Congress 1868–1921 (Harvard UP, 1958). online
- Taylor, R. The TUC: From the General Strike to New Unionism (2000). online
- Wrigley, Chris, ed. British Trade Unions, 1945–1995 (Manchester UP, 1997) online
- The History of the TUC (Trades Union Congress) 1868–1968: A pictorial Survey of a Social Revolution — Illustrated with Contemporary Prints, Documents and Photographs edited by Lionel Birch; published in large paperback by Hamlyn/General Council of Trade Union Congress in 1968 with a foreword by George Woodcock
