= Nesta Wyn Ellis =

- Born: November 1940
- Died: 25 November 2025 (aged 84–85); Cardiff
- Occupations: Author, Journalist, Singer
- Spouse: Edward Moss

Nesta Myfanwy Wyn Ellis (1940-25 November 2025) was a journalist and author of Welsh origin whose books included a biography of the former prime minister Sir John Major.

She was also a radical Liberal politician who stood a number of times for Parliament.

== Background ==
Nesta Wyn Ellis was born in the Hiraethog Rural District, Denbighshire, and brought up in Snowdonia, North Wales, where her extracurricular training in the performing arts began. She was educated at Llanrwst Grammar School in Llanrwst, Denbighshire, and at the University of Liverpool, where she graduated B.Sc. She travelled widely in Africa in the 1970s when she launched her career in journalism interviewing dissidents in South Africa and subsequently lived partly over three years at the Mount Kenya Safari Club, then part-time in the US in Washington DC for over a decade and more recently in Paris. Musical and dramatic arts have formed the basis of the work in which she is currently involved; film and music production, direction and performance. In April 2000 she moved from London to Paris where she continued her musical development, singing French favourites as well as her own compositions in French and English. Her accomplishments were noted by some UK TV companies who filmed documentaries of her life in Paris.

== Professional career ==
Much of Nesta Wyn Ellis's early writing was about political issues, such as African political and human rights articles in The Guardian to the Snowdonia National Park in The Illustrated London News. She became the political correspondent for the magazine Harpers and Queen. She was a frequent contributor of articles to the UK quality newspapers such as The Times and magazines, including Punch and well known for her two biographies (of John Major and of the 7th Marquess of Bath) and several novels, each different in their style of storytelling and material. Her exclusive articles sent from Africa's troubled zones in the 1970s appeared in The Guardian. Later she became a contributor to the humorous weekly, Punch, and political correspondent of Harper's & Queen.

During the 1980s, her often controversial profiles of well known people, including many leading politicians appeared in the weekend magazines of The Sunday Times, The Telegraph, The Mail on Sunday, The Sunday Mirror and The People, and in Woman's Journal and were syndicated worldwide.

== Political career ==
She was attracted to the Liberal party, her native North Wales being strongly identified with Lloyd George. She was a ward secretary and Young Liberal Chairman of St. Marylebone Association from 1964 to 1966. At the age of 25 she stood for Parliament as Liberal candidate for the Spelthorne Division of Surrey at the General Election of March 1966. Her career as author, journalist and commentator was preceded by an emphasis on her political activities: these included standing four times in Westminster Parliamentary elections, as a Liberal including one bye-election in Brighton Pavilion and in the first European Parliamentary election of 1979. After the latter she withdrew from political life to pursue her writing career but her books, especially the novel 'The Banker's Daughter' (Sidgwick and Jackson 1989, Blake 1994, Lioness Books on Amazon Kindle 2014) and her biography of John Major, (Macdonald 1991, Futura 1992, Dynasty Press on Kindle 2015) benefited from her political experience, the latter especially on the hustings upon which she was able to write with personal empathy of John Major's early political career. Her critical commentaries on political events and personalities continued in her blogs from Paris and London.

General Election 1966: Spelthorne Electorate 60,676
Party	Candidate	Votes	%	±%
Conservative	Sir George Beresford Craddock	22,473	45.79	−1.23
Labour	Ronald G Wallace	19,986	40.72	+5.19
Liberal	Nesta Wyn Ellis	6,624	13.50	−3.95
Majority		2,487	5.07	−6.42
Turnout		49,083	80.89	+0.76
Conservative hold		Swing	-4.03	

In 1967 she was adopted as Liberal prospective parliamentary candidate for the Folkestone and Hythe division of Kent. In 1968 she campaigned for the Liberal Party Leader to be elected by the party membership rather than just the Liberal MPs. She did not contest the Folkestone seat as she was selected as Liberal candidate for the Brighton Pavilion Division of Sussex at the 1969 Brighton Pavilion by-election. During the campaign, she called for the UK government to recognise the Republic of Biafra a secessionist state in south-eastern Nigeria that existed from 30 May 1967 to 15 January 1970.

1969 Brighton Pavilion by-election Electorate
Party	Candidate	Votes	%	±%
Conservative	Julian Amery	17,636	70.54	+12.40
Labour	Thomas Skeffington-Lodge	4,654	18.62	−23.24
Liberal	Nesta Wyn Ellis	2,711	10.84	N/A
Majority		12,982	51.9	+35.7
Turnout		25,001		
Conservative hold		Swing		

In 1969 she published a 4-page pamphlet 'Nesta Wyn Ellis, Liberal, Says Together We Can'. Although she did not contest the 1970 General Election she remained active in the Liberal party. She was a representative of the Hampstead Liberal Association at the 1970 Liberal Assembly speaking in debate on British foreign policy in Africa. She was Liberal candidate for the Chipping Barnet Division of Greater London at the February 1974 General Election.

General Election February 1974: Chipping Barnet Electorate 56,007
Party	Candidate	Votes	%	±%
Conservative	Reginald Maudling	22,094	48.0	n/a
Labour	John Angus Donald Mills	12,183	26.5	n/a
Liberal	Nesta Wyn Ellis	11,714	25.5	n/a
Majority		9,911	21.5	n/a
Turnout			82.1	n/a
Conservative win (new seat)				

In 1974 she published 'Dear Elector: The Truth about MPs' based partly on her own first hand experience as a UK Parliamentary candidate and also on interviews with politicians and their wives. She was again Liberal candidate for the Chipping Barnet Division of Greater London at the October 1974 General Election.

General Election October 1974: Chipping Barnet Electorate 56,473
Party	Candidate	Votes	%	±%
Conservative	Reginald Maudling	19,661	47.3	−0.7
Labour	John Angus Donald Mills	11,795	28.4	+1.9
Liberal	Nesta Wyn Ellis	8,884	21.4	−4.1
National Front	Ronald Arthur Cole	1,207	2.9	n/a
Majority		7,866	18.9	
Turnout			73.6	
Conservative hold		Swing		

In 1977 she became concerned at the increase in support for the far right fascist parties in Britain, writing an article in The Times on the subject. In 1978 when the Liberal party leader David Steel proposed the Lib-Lab Pact to prop up the Labour government, Wyn Ellis, along with the likes of former party leader Jo Grimond opposed the idea. For her final public election, she stood for the first time in her native part of Britain, as Liberal candidate for the North Wales constituency at the first European Parliament elections in 1979.

European Parliament election, 1979: North Wales Electorate 493,181
Party	Candidate	Votes	%	±%
Conservative	Beata Brookes	71,473	41.9	N/A
Labour	T. A. Dillon	46,627	26.4	N/A
Plaid Cymru	Ieuan Wyn Jones	34,171	19.3	N/A
Liberal	Nesta Wyn Ellis	21,989	12.4	N/A
Majority		27,546	15.5	N/A
Turnout		176,960	35.9	N/A
Conservative win (new seat)				

== Creative life ==
Her books and journalism led to frequent TV appearances and documentaries were built around her books and other artistic work, including stage performances in London, Paris and the Edinburgh Festival Fringe. In 1989, her first novel, The Banker's Daughter a story set in the worlds of politics, banking and crime brought her public acclaim in the field of fiction writing. In 1991 she published a biography of British Prime Minister John Major to the accompaniment of year long daily press coverage and tabloid sensation. A light hearted anthology of brief biographies, "Britain's Top 100 Eligible Bachelors," led to frequent TV appearances on studio programmes and documentaries throughout the 1990s. In 2010 Dynasty Press published her biography of Alexander Thynn, 7th Marquess of Bath.

She was a singer and composer who hand wrote her piano scores to accompany her lyrics in English and French. Her stage performances led to film appearances in long and short features. She was also a producer with her service to foreign production companies, 'Paris Production Services' and produced with her British company Lioness Films Ltd (UK) her first feature, currently in development, is "Three Days In September", the story of a singer who follows her love to Paris, which she would also direct. She also wrote songs and music to form the basis of the score.

In 1995, after singing on a BBC Arena pilot documentary about Jimi Hendrix, she began composing songs and in October 2007 launched her work with an album "Experience of Love" at a cocktail concert sponsored by Camelot at the Pizza on the Park, a premier London jazz venue. Other dinner and cocktail concerts followed at prime London venues including St James's Church, Piccadilly with a concert to heal the nation after the death of Diana, Princess of Wales. A dinner concert on 14 February 1999 at The Poet's House also launched her collection of poems 'Love Notes." In August 1999 she took an all French one woman show, "Saisons d'Amour" to The Edinburgh Fringe. She performed this again at Le Pibar in Paris in October 2000. She also wrote a further three novels, The Mistress, A Love Is Like a Day, Three Days in September (film in development) recently published by Lioness Books on Amazon Kindle.

== Film career ==
In Paris she developed a new career working with music and film. She continued composing and performed her songs and French Repertoire classics at cafe concerts. In 2001, she recorded an all-French album, "Les Rivages de Paradis". She played the star role in an award-winning short film "Bolsa de Huesos y Recuerdos" written and directed by Venezuelan film maker Beatriz Ciliberto, for which she also composed and performed the song "Tes Yeux" (see IMDb). She played small roles in a number of French film productions, notably the award-winning "Venus Noire" and "Coco" that were released internationally, and in numerous other French productions. In 2007, she launched her facilities service, Paris Production Services, now an arm of her UK based film production company Lioness Films Ltd. She supported international film companies by providing on the ground facilities for their productions based in Paris and the rest of France.

== Death ==
In June 2026 it was reported by her long time friend and piano tuner David Hamilton that Nesta died in Cardiff on 25 November 2025.

== Selected publications ==
- Nesta Wyn Ellis, Liberal, Says Together We Can (1969)
- Dear Elector: The Truth about MPs (1974)
- John Major (1991, 1992, 2015)
- The Banker's Daughter (1989, 1994, 2014)
- Britain's Top 100 Eligible Bachelors (1994)
- The Marquess of Bath, Lord of Love (2010, 2012)
- The Mistress (2014)
- A Love is Like a Day (2014)
- Three Days in September (2014)
