= Dave Hill (politician) =

British Marxist politician and academic (born 1945)

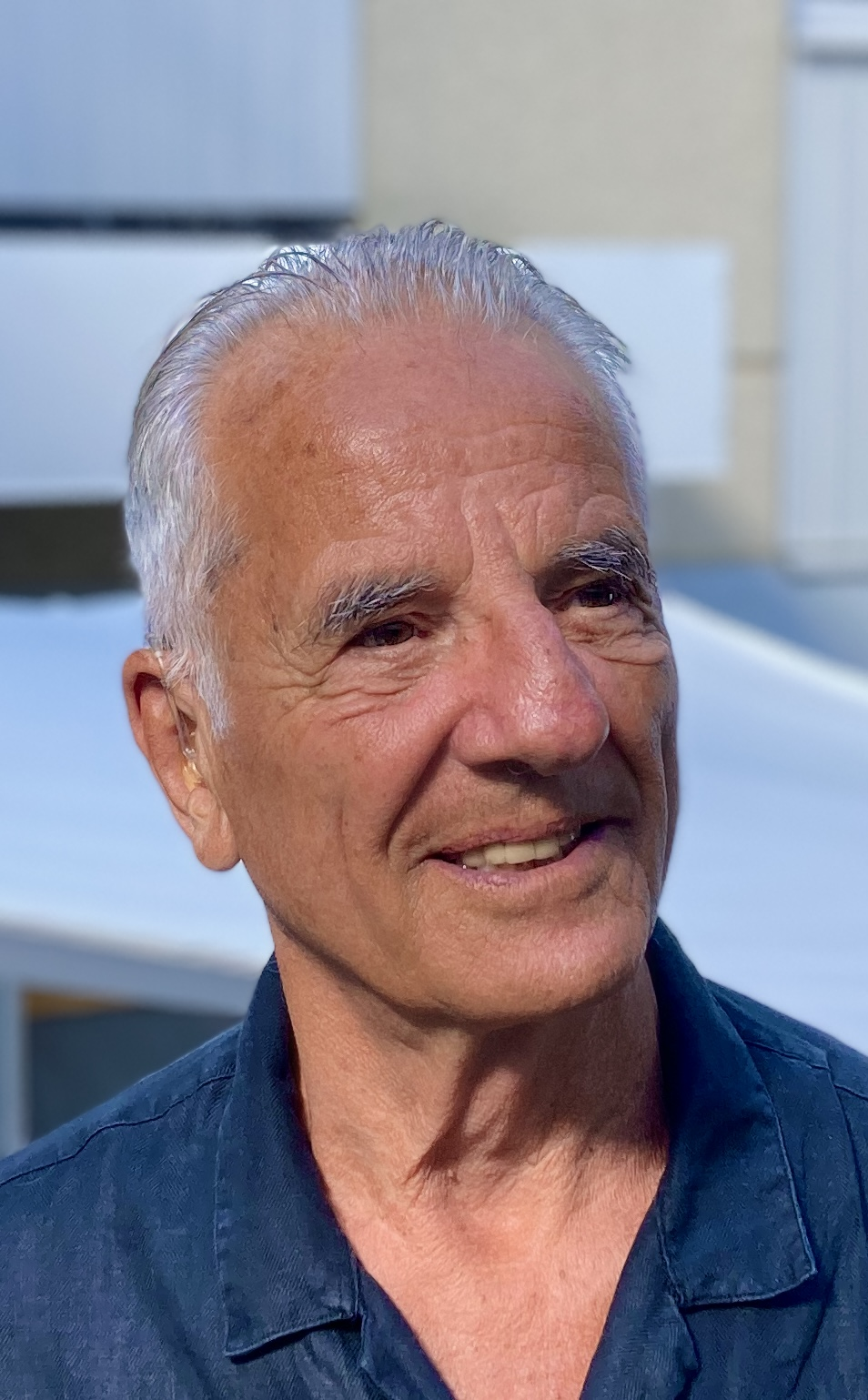

Brighton Borough Councillor
- In office 1974–1976
- In office 1979–1983

East Sussex County Councillor
- In office 1981–1989

Personal details
- Born: 10 October 1945 (age 80) London, England
- Party: Labour (1961–2005; 2018–2020)
- Other political affiliations: Socialist Resistance (2005–2021), Anti-Capitalist Resistance (2021-); Respect (2005–2013); No2EU (2009); Trade Unionist and Socialist Coalition (2010, 2015), Labour Left Alliance (2019-) Socialist Labour Network (2022-)
- Occupation: Academic

David Stanley Hill (born 10 October 1945) is a British Marxist politician, academic and educational activist. He is Research Professor (Emeritus) in Education at Anglia Ruskin University, Chelmsford, England, and also visiting professor at the National and Kapodistrian University of Athens, Greece, and in the Social Policy Research Centre at Middlesex University, London. He was an elected Labour Party councillor for East Sussex County Council and Brighton Borough Council in the 1970s and 1980s and has been a candidate in thirteen local, national and European elections since 1972, most recently as Parliamentary Candidate in Hove and Portslade in the 2015 general election for the Trade Unionist and Socialist Coalition (TUSC). In Britain, he is currently a member of the Labour Left Alliance, the Socialist Labour Network, and the Campaign for a New Workers Party.

== Early life ==
Dave Hill was brought up in a working-class family from the East End of London. His mother was a dressmaker and his father, a cabinet maker and carpenter. Hill became the first in his family to go to a grammar school; he attended Westlain Grammar School in Brighton.

Hill studied Politics and Modern History at Manchester University and subsequently gained master's degrees, one in politics and another in Education at the University of Sussex and a PhD at the London University Institute of Education under the supervision of Geoff Whitty. During the late 1970s and the early 1980s, he worked as a part-time photo-journalist for some of the Left Press in Britain, covering elections in Portugal, Spain, and France for New Socialist, Labour Weekly and Tribune.

== Politics ==
In 1961, Dave Hill joined the Labour Party and became Chair of Brighton Young Socialists. In 2005, after 44 years of active membership, he left the Labour Party and joined the International Socialist Group (which later merged into Socialist Resistance), and the Respect Party. He left Socialist Resistance in 2014 and joined the Independent Socialist Network, an organisation within the Trade Unionist and Socialist Coalition (TUSC), for whom he has fought local and parliamentary elections, and was a member of Left Unity. He unsuccessfully applied to rejoin the Labour Party in July 2016 as part of the influx of socialists into the Labour Party to support the left-wing leadership of Jeremy Corbyn and, after an appeal, was re-admitted to Labour in 2018. He is now a member of the National Organising Group of the Labour Left Alliance, of the Socialist Labour Network, and the Campaign for a Mass Workers Party. Following the suspension of Jeremy Corbyn from the Labour Party in October 2020, Dave Hill once again resigned from the Labour Party.

=== Local politics ===
As a Labour Party member, Hill was an elected East Sussex County Councillor between 1981–1989 and in the mid-1980s, became Labour Group Leader on East Sussex County Council. He was also a Brighton Borough Councillor during 1975–76 and again during 1979–83. From the beginning of the Thatcher years, Hill became more radicalized and opposed what he saw as the increasingly rightward drift in the local and national Labour Party. In 1988, Hill announced he was leaving Labour electoral politics. He briefly rejoined from 2018 to 2020 to support Jeremy Corbyn's leadership of the Labour Party.

=== National and European elections ===
In the 1979 and 1987 parliamentary elections, he was the Labour parliamentary candidate for Brighton Pavilion, but was defeated both times by Julian Amery, the Conservative Member of Parliament. During the 1979 local elections he scored the highest vote ever recorded for a Labour candidate in Brighton. Hill contested the 2010 General Election as the candidate for the Trade Unionist and Socialist Coalition in the Brighton Kemptown Constituency, and in the 2015 General Election he fought the Hove and Portslade Constituency again for the Trade Union and Socialist Coalition. Hill contested the 2009 European election for the left-wing electoral alliance, No to EU – Yes to Democracy as lead candidate for the South East Region of England.

== Teaching and scholarship ==
Between 1967 and 1969, Hill taught at Stockwell Manor Comprehensive School. From 1972, he taught in higher education, Bognor Regis College of Education which became part of West Sussex Institute of Higher Education (now the University of Chichester), mainly part-time because of his responsibilities as trade union representative and as an elected councillor. He also taught prisoners, adult education tutors, youth workers, and in Thorney Island Refugee Camp for Vietnamese boat people. He subsequently developed and led for five years the Crawley Bachelor of Education Degree for mature and nonstandard entry students.

In his long career he has taught in London's East End, at Tower Hamlets College in 1996–1997, and after that at the University of Northampton in between 1997 and 2010, where he was Professor of Education Policy. He taught at Middlesex University between 2010 and 2012. Between 2012 and 2016 he was research professor of education at Anglia Ruskin University, Chelmsford, England, and pays regular visits to Athens, Greece, and Ankara, Turkey. While on trade union and Left demonstrations he has been teargassed in Athens and Ankara. He is visiting professor of education at the National and the Kapodistrian University of Athens, and has held visiting professor positions at Middlesex University and the University of Limerick, Ireland He was made redundant from Anglia Ruskin University in April 2016 and is now emeritus Professor of Education Research there. From March 2017, he was visiting professor with the Social Policy Research Centre at Middlesex University for a three-year term. In November 2020, he was awarded an Honorary Doctorate from the Centro de Estudios Latinoamericanos de Educación Inclusiva | CELEI |, Santiago, Chile. He is also a Research Fellow of the Research Center of Contemporary China at Wuhan University, Hubei, China; Fellow of the International Institute for Research and Education (IIRE), Amsterdam, the Netherlands

=== Educational activism ===
In 1989, Hill set up the independent-left research unit, the Institute for Education Policy Studies and co-founded and chaired the Hillcole Group of Radical Left Educators between 1989 and 2001. Affiliated writers and academics sustained Marxist and socialist educational analysis and policy formulation in Britain, through its publications of two books and thirteen booklets, published by Tufnell Press between 1990 and 2002. It included Caroline Benn Mike Cole, Glenn Rikowski and for the first few years, Gaby Weiner and Stephen Ball. It also included some activists from the Socialist Teachers Alliance.

In March 2003, Hill founded the Journal of Critical Education Policy Studies a free online refereed international journal, which he manages and chief edits. It has become one of the widest circulation English language online refereed education policy journals, with more than two million free downloads since 2003. He is also series editor for Routledge Studies in Education, Neoliberalism, and Marxism. He has cowritten or co-edited a number of books and articles with Mike Cole, Glenn Rikowski, Peter McLaren, Deb Kelsh, Sheila Macrine, and Kostas Skordoulis and was chair and then Program Chair of the Marxist Analysis of Schools and Society (MASSES) Special Interest Group of the American Educational Research Association between 2006 and 2010.

In 2010 Hill set up the annual ICCE conference, the International Conference on Critical Education, with Kostas Skordoulis of the Kapodistrian and National University of Athens University. These have been held at the University of Athens in 2011 and 2012, Ankara University, Turkey in 2013, the University of Thessaloniki, Greece in 2014, the University of Lower Silesia, Wrocław, Poland, in 2015, Middlesex University, London, in 2016, the National and Kapodistrian University of Athens, in 2017, the university of East London, London, in 2018. The 9th ICCE Conference was held at the Universita Federico II in Naples, Italy, 3–6 June 2019. The 10th ICCE Conference was held in Thessaloniki, Greece, 4–8 July 2022., the 11th at the University of Malta, and the 12th ICCE Conference will be held at the University of Ankara, Turkiye, 3–6 July 2024.

Hill lectures worldwide to academic, trade union and activist groups and conferences on the politics of education, and locations of his speaking engagements have included China, Greece, Turkey, Portugal, Finland, Germany, France, Italy, Sweden, Canada, the US, the United Arab Emirates, Israel, Hong Kong, Taiwan, Australia, India and elsewhere. His writing has been translated into Chinese (Mandarin), Greek, Portuguese, Spanish, and Turkish.

In his writing Hill writes from a classical Marxist perspective, focusing on issues of social class, the relationship between social class and 'race', neoliberalism, socialist education, and Marxist critiques of New Labour policy on schooling and teacher education. Videos of some of his interviews are online, and some of his many articles and chapters are online.

== Family life ==
Hill has been married twice, first with Marylyn Berry (married 1967, divorced 1991), with whom he has two daughters, Rachel and Naomi, and four grandchildren, Josh, Hannah, James and Ella. His second wife is Leena Helavaara Robertson (married 2009), with whom he has two stepsons and five step-grandchildren.

== Selected publications ==
- Vittoria, P., and Hill, D. with Accioly, I. (eds.) (2019), O Bella Ciao; Critical Education as Resistance against Populism, Sexism and Racism. Brighton: Educazione Aperta.
- Rasinski, L., Hill, D. and Skordoulis, C. (eds.) (2018), Marxism and Education: International Perspectives on Theory and Action. New York and London: Routledge.
- Hill, D. (2017), Class, Race and Education Under Neoliberal Capitalism. New Delhi: Aakar Books.
- Hill, D. (2016), Eleştirel Eğitim ve Marksizm (Critical Education and Marxism). Istanbul: Kalkedon Yayınevi.
- Gezgin, U. B., İnal K. and Hill, D. (eds.) (2014), The Gezi Revolt: People's Revolutionary Resistance against Neoliberal Capitalism in Turkey. Brighton: Institute for Education Policy Studies.
- Hill, D. (2013), Marxist Essays on Education: Class and `Race’, Neoliberalism and Capitalism. Brighton: The Institute for Education Policy Studies.
- Hill, D. (ed.) (2013), Immiseration Capitalism and Education: Austerity, Resistance and Revolt. Brighton: Institute for Education Policy Studies.
- Kelsh, D., Hill, D. and Macrine, S. (eds.) (2010), Class in Education: Knowledge, Pedagogy, Subjectivity. London: Routledge.
- Macrine, S., McLaren, P. and Hill, D. (eds.) (2010), Revolutionizing Pedagogy: Education for Social Justice Within and Beyond Global Neo-Liberalism. London: Palgrave Macmillan.
- Hill, D. and Robertson, L. Helavaara (eds.) (2009), Equality in the Primary School: Promoting good practice across the curriculum. London: Continuum.
- Hill, D. (ed.) (2009), Contesting Neoliberal Education: Public Resistance and Collective Advance. New York: Routledge.
- Hill, D. (ed.) (2009), The Rich World and the Impoverishment of Education: Diminishing Democracy, Equity and Workers' Rights. New York: Routledge.
- Hill, D. and Kumar, R. (eds.) (2009), Global Neoliberalism and Education and its Consequences. New York: Routledge.
- Hill, D. and Rosskam, E. (eds.) (2009), The Developing World and State Education: Neoliberal Depredation and Egalitarian Alternatives. New York: Routledge.
- Hill, D; McLaren, P., Cole, M., and Rikowski, G. (eds.) (2002), Marxism Against Postmodernism in Educational Theory, Lanham, Maryland, USA: Lexington Books. American Education Studies Association (AESA) Critics Choice Award-Winner.
- Hill, D. and Cole, M. (eds.) (2001), Schooling and Equality: Fact, Concept and Policy. London: Kogan Page.
- Cole, M., Hill, D.; McLaren, P., and Rikowski G. (2001), Red Chalk: On Schooling, Capitalism and Politics, Brighton: Institute for Education Policy Studies. (84pp.)
- Hessari, R. and Hill, D. (1989), Practical Ideas for Multi-cultural Learning and Teaching in the Primary Classroom, London: Routledge.

His recent articles include:

- Hill, D. (2020), "The Good, The Bad and The Ugly: Coronavirus, Capitalism and Socialism: A Marxist Response". Insurgent Scripts, 29 May. New Delhi: Insurgent Scripts. Online at: https://www.academia.edu/95248715/The_Good_the_Bad_and_the_Ugly_Coronavirus_Capitalism_and_Socialism_a_Marxist_Response
- Hill, D. (2021), "Neo-Fascism, Capitalism and Marxist Educators". Educação & Realidade, 46(3) Porto Alegre, Brazil, UFRGS (Universidade do Rio Grande do Sul), Brazil. Online in Portuguese at: https://doi.org/10.1590/2175-6236117660 and at: https://www.academia.edu/95425783/CITATION_Hill_D_2021_English_Translation_of_Neo_Fascism_Capitalism_and_Marxist_Educators_Educa%C3%A7%C3%A3o_and_Realidade_46_3
- Hill, D. (2022), "Classical Marxism, Ideology and Education Policy". Critical Education, 13(1) Canada. Online at: https://ices.library.ubc.ca/index.php/criticaled/article/view/186658
- Hill, D. (2022), "Excluding/ Including the Raced and Gendered Working Class: neo-liberal, neo-conservative and neo-fascist schooling and education in Covid times: a Classical Marxist critical analysis and activist programme". Journal for Critical Education Policy Studies 19(3). Online at http://www.jceps.com/wp-content/uploads/2022/02/19-3-3i.pdf
