= 1969 Brighton Pavilion by-election =

UK Parliamentary by-election

The 1969 Brighton Pavilion by-election of 27 March 1969 was held after Conservative Member of Parliament (MP) William Teeling resigned from the House of Commons due to health problems. The seat was retained by the Conservatives. The successful Conservative candidate was Julian Amery, a former government minister who had lost his seat at Preston North at the last general election.

== Result ==
Brighton Pavilion by-election, 1969
Party	Candidate	Votes	%	±%
Conservative	Julian Amery	17,636	70.54	+12.40
Labour	Thomas Skeffington-Lodge	4,654	18.62	−23.24
Liberal	Nesta Wyn Ellis	2,711	10.84	New
Majority		12,982	51.92	+35.64
Turnout		25,001		
Conservative hold		Swing	+17.8	

== Previous result ==
General election 1966: Brighton Pavilion
Party	Candidate	Votes	%	±%
Conservative	William Teeling	22,687	58.14	+5.0
Labour	J.A. Graham	16,333	41.86	+13.6
Majority		6,354	16.28	−8.6
Turnout		39,020	70.27	+0.3
Conservative hold		Swing	-4.3	

== Aftermath ==
The result was one of three Conservative wins in by-elections held that day, with the party also retaining Weston-super-Mare and gaining Walthamstow East from Labour. Across these three contests there was an average swing of 16% from Labour to Conservative. Conservative Shadow Home Secretary Quintin Hogg noted this would give his party a comfortable majority in the House of Commons if it were repeated at the next general election. His colleague, Anthony Barber, the Chairman of the Conservative Party, reacting to the results, called on the Labour Government to "throw in the towel." The next day's Glasgow Herald reported that the "dispiriting performance" by Labour in these first by-elections of 1969 raised questions as to when the tide would turn for the party and noted that "some Labour MPS feel in their bones" that the party could not recover to win the next general election which would have to be held sometime in the next two years. However the same article also noted that the low turnouts in Brighton and Walthamstow East had distorted the results and allowed Labour to claim that as its supporters had stayed at home and were reserving their judgement on the Government.

Amery easily held the seat at the next year's general election with a majority of over 10,000 votes.
