= Welsh Socialist Republican Movement =

1979–1982 Welsh political organisation

Welsh Socialist Republican Movement Mudiad Sosialaidd Gweriniaethol Cymru
- Abbreviation: WSRM
- General Secretary: Robert Griffiths
- Chairman: Tim Richards
- Vice-Chairman: Gareth Miles
- Founded: 1979
- Dissolved: 1982
- Split from: Plaid Cymru
- Merged into: Communist Party of Britain
- Headquarters: Cardiff
- Newspaper: Y Faner Goch; Welsh Republic
- Ideology: Welsh nationalism Welsh republicanism Marxism-Leninism
- Political position: Far-left

The Welsh Tricolour with Star

The Welsh Socialist Republican Movement (WSRM; Welsh: Mudiad Sosialaidd Gweriniaethol Cymru) was a short-lived nationalist political movement that operated in Wales from 1979 to 1982. The organisation was established as a Marxist alternative to Plaid Cymru, arising from frustration with that party's perceived failure to take a strong stance on Welsh independence and socialist principles.

== Background and formation ==
=== Political context ===
The WSRM emerged in the aftermath of the devastating defeat of Welsh devolution in the 1979 Welsh devolution referendum. On 1 March 1979, the people of Wales rejected devolution by a ratio of almost 4 to 1, with only 20.3% voting in favour of the Wales Act 1978. This crushing defeat was seen by many Welsh nationalists as a catastrophic failure, compounded by the Conservative victory in the 1979 general election under Margaret Thatcher, which brought threats to Wales's steel and coal industries.

=== Founding and early development ===
The WSRM was founded by former Plaid Cymru activists, most notably Robert Griffiths, who served as Plaid Cymru's Research Officer, and Gareth Miles, a prominent Welsh-language author and activist. Griffiths was appointed the movement's general secretary, Tim Richards its chairman, and Miles its vice-chairman. The movement initially operated as a pressure group within Plaid Cymru before declaring a separate existence. Griffiths's employment with Plaid Cymru was terminated; there were suspicions that this was because the WSRM had criticised the party's failure to oppose the devolution referendum strongly enough.

The founding statement of the WSRM clearly expressed the intention of creating a revolutionary Marxist organisation, though it was described as having a heterodox ideological composition—less a centralist Leninist machine and more a radical collective of Welsh socialists.

== Organisation and ideology ==
=== Political philosophy ===
The WSRM combined Welsh nationalism with Marxist-Leninist ideology, arguing for a Welsh Socialist Republic. The organisation contained "a variety of Marxisms" ranging from non-aligned traditional Communist Party supporters to those aligned with the International Marxist Group and Maoist tendencies.

The movement attracted attention from English-based leftist groups and expressed solidarity with the republican struggle in Northern Ireland, which later drew the attention of British security services.

=== Publications ===
The WSRM initially continued the publication of Y Faner Goch (The Red Flag), a newspaper originally started by Plaid Cymru activists to promote Welsh socialist republicanism. This publication was later replaced by Welsh Republic, which maintained a radical working-class orientation. The movement also produced pamphlets (including Neil Kinnock and the Anti-Taffy League in 1979) and published For Socialism and National Liberation: Resolutions and Reports of the First Congress of the Welsh Socialist Republican Movement in 1981.

== Police operations and arrests ==
=== Operation Tân ===
Between October 1979 and September 1980, a series of police raids targeted left-wing and nationalist activists across Wales as part of Operation Tân ('fire'), ostensibly aimed at finding those responsible for the Meibion Glyndŵr (Sons of Glyndŵr) arson campaign against English-owned holiday homes. The largest series of dawn raids coincided with Palm Sunday on 30 March 1980, in which around fifty individuals were arrested across Wales. Among those detained during the operation were WSRM activists and thirty members of Cofiwn (lit. 'we remember'), with masses of political material confiscated in the search for the arsonists. John Barnard Jenkins, the former leader of Mudiad Amddiffyn Cymru (MAC), was a member of the WSRM at the time and was among those arrested. Shortly prior to Palm Sunday, both Jenkins and Robert Griffiths had been interviewed regarding the arson campaign for the BBC programme Nationwide on 12 March 1980, during which they outlined the motivations behind the campaign and expressed sympathy for it. The police operation also included arrests of Sinn Féin members who were subsequently charged with offences unrelated to the Welsh arson campaign. The WSRM's public support for the republican struggle in Northern Ireland had raised alarm bells with the authorities.

=== The conspiracy trial ===
In May 1982, five people connected to the WSRM were arrested on charges related to explosives allegedly intended for use during the visit of the Prince and Princess of Wales to Wales in October 1981. The charges included:

- Nicholas Hodges and Adrian Stone – charged with intent to cause explosions at British Steel's premises in Gabalfa, Cardiff
- Gareth Westacott and David Burns – charged with similar offences relating to an army recruiting office in Pontypridd

The subsequent conspiracy trial took place in Cardiff between September and November 1983. Eight defendants were accused of conspiracy to cause explosions between March 1980 and March 1982. Of these, one failed to surrender to bail, one was acquitted with the agreement of the prosecution, one pleaded guilty to possession of detonators, one was found guilty by the jury of possession of detonators, and four were entirely acquitted by the jury of all charges against them.

Many WSRM members spent 11 months on remand only to be released when found innocent of any violent actions.

=== Welsh Political Prisoners' Defence Campaign ===
A support organisation called the Welsh Political Prisoners' Defence Campaign was established in May 1982 to coordinate defence strategy and publicise the circumstances of police involvement in the arrests. The campaign argued that the prosecutions represented political policing and harassment of legitimate political activists.

== Dissolution and aftermath ==
=== Collapse of the movement ===
The experience of arrests, pre-trial detention, police interviews, and surveillance severely damaged the cohesion of the WSRM, which failed to survive the disruption. The combination of state pressure and internal ideological contradictions led to the movement's dissolution around 1982.

=== Successor organisations and dispersal ===
After the WSRM's collapse, its members dispersed in several directions. Around six members, including founding figures Gareth Miles and Robert Griffiths, joined what became the Communist Party of Britain. Some members returned to Plaid Cymru, whilst others became active in single-issue campaign movements. The socialist remnants published a few more copies of Y Faner Goch before reforming in 1986 to create Cymru Goch (Red Wales), a small socialist political party that lasted another 20 years and continued publishing Y Faner Goch until 2003.

== Historical assessments ==
John Osmond, founder of the Institute of Welsh Affairs, wrote a detailed account of the conspiracy trial in his book Police Conspiracy? (1984), which examined the police investigation methods and raised questions about political policing in Wales. The book was not without controversy, with some defendants criticising Osmond's account.

A public enquiry into "Political policing in Wales" was held at South Glamorgan County Council headquarters in March 1984, organised by the Welsh Campaign for Civil and Political Liberties in the aftermath of the conspiracy trial.

Modern assessments suggest that while the WSRM represented "the best of the so-called Welsh Republicanism failures," it was ultimately "shut down by the state in 1982" through police operations and prosecutions that disrupted its organisation beyond recovery.
