= Communist Party of Britain =

Political party in the United Kingdom

Communist Party of Britain Plaid Gomiwnyddol Prydain (Welsh)
- Abbreviation: CPB
- General Secretary: Alex Gordon
- Chair: Lorraine Douglas
- Vice-Chair: Tony Conway; Mollie Brown
- Founded: 1985 as the Communist Campaign Group; 23 April 1988; 38 years ago as the Communist Party of Britain
- Split from: Communist Party of Great Britain
- Preceded by: Communist Party of Great Britain (majority); Welsh Socialist Republican Movement; Straight Left; Communist Campaign Group
- Headquarters: Ruskin House, Croydon, London
- Newspaper: Communist Review; Communist Women; Unity!
- Youth wing: Young Communist League
- Membership (2025): ▼1,153
- Ideology: Communism; Marxism–Leninism; Euroscepticism
- Political position: Far-left
- National affiliation: Co-ordinating Committee of Communist Parties in Britain; No2EU (2009–2014)
- International affiliation: IMCWP
- Colours: Red and gold

Election symbol

Party flag

Website
- www.communistparty.org.uk

The Communist Party of Britain (CPB) is a Marxist-Leninist party in Great Britain which emerged from a dispute between Eurocommunists and Marxist-Leninists in the Communist Party of Great Britain in 1988. It follows Marxist-Leninist theory and supports what it regards as existing socialist states. The party has fraternal relationships with the ruling parties in Cuba, China, Laos, and Vietnam. It is affiliated nationally to the Cuba Solidarity Campaign and the Venezuela Solidarity Campaign. It is a member of the International Meeting of Communist and Workers' Parties, together with 117 other political parties. After the fall of the Soviet Union, the party was one of two original British signatories to the Pyongyang Declaration.

== History ==
=== Origins ===
The origins of the CPB go back to the pro-Soviet opposition during in the 1960s, whom criticised the CPGB leadership for not supporting socialist countries, focusing on trade unions too much, and wasting resources on elections which was hurting relations with the Labour left.

In the period leading up to 1988, the Communist Party of Great Britain was in turmoil as the leadership fought the Marxist–Leninist tendencies inside the party.

In September 1982, controversy came from the feature article in the CPGB's theoretical journal, Marxism Today which was controlled by Eurocommunists and Martin Jacques. The feature, written by party member Tony Lane, was critical of the labour movement and trade unions. This caused a public response from Mick Costello and Tony Chater whom published their response in the form of an attack on the front page of the Morning Star newspaper. The executive committee backed the editor of Marxism Today, Martin Jacques due to the comments made by the two men posing a risk to their authority.

The CPGB's executive committee was flooded with communication from party branches over the affair, and the controversy had made the internal divisions of the party clearer. After this, the editorial board of Marxism Today introduced a disclaimer from the February 1983 issue onwards that said: "the views expressed by authors are personal and not necessarily those of the editor or editorial board".

While the Eurocommunists grouped more around Marxism Today and away from a focus on social class, members who wished for the involvement of class-based politics in the British Road to Socialism grouped more around the Morning Star. These early signs of trouble attracted international attention, notably from the East German SED which was concerned about the Eurocommunist tendency in the CPGB.

At the CPGB's 38th congress in November 1983, Tony Chater the editor of the Morning Star, as well as the assistant editor David Whitfield, were both removed from their positions on the party's executive. However, they were able to keep their positions at the paper, as it is owned and managed separately by the People's Press Printing Society co-operative. Prior to the controversy around Chater the PPPS had not been considered or treated independent of the CPGB, despite it being legally so, and Chater had used this technicality to keep his position.

The following year at the PPPS Annual General Meeting in June 1984, a majority of delegates re-elected Chater and Whitfield to the management committee of the newspaper, against the wishes of the CPGB leadership. In November 1984, the North-West District Congress elected an opposition majority to its District Committee, to which the leadership responded by declaring the district election illegitimate.

A similar movement was brewing in London, where the CPGB General Secretary Gordon McLennan pre-emptively dissolved the London District Congress and 11 members of the District Committee were suspended. In Scotland, 20 branches were brought under disciplinary sanctions. The CPGB Executive Committee then brought the dispute to a special congress on 18–20 May 1985, with a draft resolution condemning the Morning Star and the group around it. Over 650 amendments were submitted to the resolution, which was eventually passed after a long debate, and followed up by the expulsion of eighteen members.

=== Communist Campaign Group ===
In June 1985, dissident and expelled members of the CPGB formed the Communist Campaign Group (CCG). The CCG explained the crisis of the CPGB as the fault of the Eurocommunists and Gordon McLennan. The CCG explained its role as to organise and execute mass resistance against the "Eurocommunist-controlled Executive Committee" using the party membership whilst dissuading and condemning actions that utilise party channels, courts of law or international assistance. Finally the CCG declared its main aims, which principally includes reinstating members, upholding the British Road to Socialism, and upholding "the rules and constitution of the Communist Party".

The Campaign Group was provided an office within the premises of the Morning Star. The first post-congress meeting of the new CPGB Executive Committee in July 1985 dropped the commitment for party members to support the Morning Star; it concluded with the dissolution of more branches and further disciplinary measures, such as the expulsion of Ken Gill.

Prospective supporters like Bert Ramelson were turned away from the CCG, mainly due to the Chater claiming in June 1983 that the CPGB was an "outside body" attempting to influence its own paper the Morning Star. Treatment of the CPGB as such meant that the CCG could not portray itself as the saviour of the party's principles.

From 1987, the CCG believed that the CPGB existed to promote reformism and class collaboration, while still defending Gorbachev's actions in the Soviet Union. Kevin Halpin was invited to Moscow to discuss the possibility that the CPGB would break apart, he was advised by the CPSU that the Campaign Group should continue working within the existing party structures.

Following their failure to challenge the CPGB's leadership, the Campaign Group called a press conference on 8 January 1988 to announce the formation of the Communist Party.

=== Formation ===
The Communist Party of Britain was established in April 1988 at a conference called to re-establish the national branch of the Third International. The event, attended by 150 delegates as representatives of a total of 1591 members, took place on 23–24 April, where one of the prominent leaders of the Campaign Group, Mike Hicks, was elected to the position of General Secretary. The CPB's control over the Morning Star and the adoption of the British Road to Socialism are cited as reasons why the CPB is the refounded CPGB. Chater emphasised this continuity at the congress, explaining at the time:

We are not creating a new Party. We are re-establishing the Party on the basis of its' [sic] rules and programme.

The first party card was issued to Andrew Rothstein, who had also been one of the founding members of the CPGB. The following year the leaders of the CPGB formally declared that they had abandoned its programme, The British Road to Socialism. Many members perceived this as the party turning its back on socialism. The CPGB dissolved itself in 1991 and reformed as the Democratic Left. Many members of the Straight Left faction who had stayed in the CPGB formed a group called "Communist Liaison" which later opted to join the CPB. Others remained in the Democratic Left or joined the Labour Party.

The party still has members who were active in the CPGB, some of whom were active in the Anti-Apartheid Movement and trade union disputes such as the Upper Clyde work-in or the miners' strike of 1984–1985.

In reaction to the Revolutions of 1989, the party initially denied that the uprising in the GDR was linked to socialism or German reunification. By Summer 1990, however, after the party's reporting of events in Romania and Czechoslovakia, they acknowledged that the people and communists in those areas had rejected socialism and the ruling communist parties. This had mixed reactions within the party.

=== Since 1998 ===
In 1998, Hicks was ousted as such in a 17–13 vote moved by John Haylett (who was also editor of the Morning Star) at a meeting of the party's executive committee. Hicks' supporters on the Management Committee of the Morning Star responded by suspending and then sacking Haylett, which led to a prolonged strike at the Morning Star, ending in victory for Haylett and his reinstatement. Some of Hicks' supporters were expelled and others resigned in protest. They formed a discussion group called Marxist Forum.

Andrew Murray was a Communist Party member until late 2016. Prior to the formation of the Respect – The Unity Coalition, with the support of the Socialist Workers Party, the party engaged in a debate about whether to join an electoral alliance with Respect and George Galloway. Those in favour, including general secretary Rob Griffiths, Andrew Murray and Morning Star editor John Haylett, were, however, defeated at a Special Congress in 2004.

In 2009, the party was one of the founder organisations of the No2EU electoral alliance alongside the RMT and a number of other left parties. The alliance stood in the 2009 and 2014 European Parliament elections on a platform of opposition to the European Union, which it considers undemocratic and neo-liberal. In 2010, the party was part of "Unity for Peace and Socialism". Later the party went on to lead a Left Leave Campaign (which was chaired by the party's General Secretary Robert Griffiths) along with the Socialist Workers Party, advocating the progressive case for a leave vote in the 2016 referendum on EU membership.

The party was a founding member of the People's Assembly Against Austerity in 2013, along with a number of other political and campaign groups, to create a broad organisation in opposition to austerity policies of the major political parties of Britain and of the European Union. The People's Charter, which the Communist Party had helped create several years earlier, was subsequently voted to be incorporated into the People's Assembly.

At the 2017 general election, the party fielded no candidates and gave its support to the Labour Party under the leadership of Jeremy Corbyn. The CPB said it was the first election at which neither it nor the CPGB had fielded any candidates. In March 2018, Susan Michie, a leading member of the CPB, said that the party would no longer stand against Labour in general elections. CPB members should be "working full tilt" for the election of Corbyn as prime minister, she said. In the 2019 general election, the party again fielded no candidates and gave its support to the Labour Party.

However following the resignation of Corbyn as leader of the Labour Party and the election of Keir Starmer as his successor, the CPB again decided to field candidates in elections. In February 2021, the party's executive committee decided to mount one of the biggest electoral campaigns since the early 1980s.

In 2021, the party contested parliamentary seats in the Scottish parliamentary election, all regional lists in the Welsh Senedd election and seats across England in the May local elections.

The party briefly had a Councillor on Barrow Borough Council, after he left the Labour Party in February 2023, until the council was abolished in April the same year.

In 2024, the party contested 14 parliamentary seats at the general election, the most it has fought since its formation in 1988. In the 1987 election the CPGB, its predecessor, fielded candidates in 19 seats, and the CPB split from it the year after. It won none of the 14 seats fought in 2024 but won 2,622 votes, its best result at a general election.

== Ideology ==
The party's ideology is Marxism–Leninism. It is anti-imperialist, anti-capitalist, pro-trade union and supports "progressive federalism". Its programme is called Britain's Road to Socialism.

=== Attitudes towards capitalism ===
The party takes the traditional Marxist approach to capitalism, saying that it is at fault for wars, climate change, and corruption. It claims that 'capitalism must be overthrown in the interests of the working class and humanity.'

==== Attitudes towards imperialism ====
The party believes that the First World War was a war between imperialists, caused by competition between monopolies.

As monopolisation and the over-accumulation of capital began to depress profitability, the finance capitalists increasingly turned to potential sources of super-profits abroad. Thus, capitalism expanded into its imperialist stage in the late 19th and early 20th centuries. As competition intensified between rival monopolies backed by their respective states, so the scene was set for the inter-imperialist 'Great War' of 1914–18.

— The development of capitalism and imperialism

They criticise US imperialism, and US involvement in regime change. They also hold that the World Trade Organization, World Bank, International Monetary Fund and European Union work to push a neoliberal, imperialist agenda.

New and existing international agencies and mechanisms such as the World Trade Organisation (WTO), GATT, the IMF, the World Bank and bilateral so called free trade and investment agreements are utilised to enforce neoliberal policies. The European Union (EU) has played a leading role in this process, confirming its character as an alliance led by the most powerful state-monopoly capitalist powers. It strives to overcome internal contradictions and transform itself into an imperialist 'United States of Europe', complete with its own foreign and military policies aligned with NATO.

— The development of capitalism and imperialism

==== Capitalism and inequality ====
The party claims that inequality in the UK can be traced back to capitalism, with workers providing the country with goods and not being properly paid for it, with workers' pay coming under pressure in the recent decades.

As exploitation intensified, so the gap between working people and the superrich has widened enormously. In Britain today, the richest 10 per cent of the population own around half of all declared personal wealth, while the poorer 50 per cent of the population own less than one-tenth of it. Moreover, capitalism has always utilised differences of sex, ethnicity, education, skill, employment status and mental and physical disability to divide the labour force and drive down wage levels.

— Social inequality and oppression

=== Attitudes towards socialist states ===
==== Soviet Union ====
The party's attitude towards the Soviet Union is positive, with criticism of Nikolai Yezhov's actions during the late 1930s as 'violations of socialist democracy'. Both the party and the Morning Star approved of perestroika and processes of reform in the late 1980s, believing that these would pave the way to a more humane socialism. The final assessment of the Soviet Union is summed up in Britain's Road to Socialism:

Russia and the other countries of the Soviet Union were transformed from semi-feudal, semi-capitalist monarchist dictatorships into modern societies with near-full employment, universally free education and healthcare, affordable housing for all, extensive and cheap public transport, impressive scientific and cultural facilities, rights for women and degrees of self-government for formerly oppressed nationalities. This was achieved through a world historic break with capitalist ownership and social relations, on the basis of social ownership of industry and centralised economic planning.

— Socialism – the lessons so far

==== North Korea ====
The Communist Party of Britain and Workers' Party of Korea are both members of the International Meeting of Communist and Workers' Parties, and so have positive relations. Thus, the Young Communist League has fraternal relations with the Socialist Patriotic Youth League. Challenge, the magazine of the YCL, have published articles in support of the DPRK.

=== Attitudes towards social issues ===
==== Transgender rights ====
The party states that it supports transgender rights, stating that, "The Communist Party supports the right of trans people to live free from discrimination and prejudice", and that "Communists are clear that efforts must continue to improve the resourcing of the current system for transgender people to access services and to transition legally, not just in Scotland, but across Britain. Together with the defence and improvement of women's sex-based services and facilities, this is part of the broader struggle for democratic rights, social justice, and socialism."

In a March 2023 statement opposing the Scottish Gender Recognition Reform Bill, the party stated that

"The Communist Party is the only political party with a coherent political analysis of sex and gender. Gender as an ideological construct should not be confused or conflated with the material reality of biological sex. Gender is the vehicle through which misogyny is enacted and normalised. Gender identity ideology is well-suited to the needs of the capitalist class, focusing as it does on individual, as opposed to collective, rights, enabling and supporting the super-exploitation of women."

During the 2024 United Kingdom general election, J. K. Rowling endorsed the party for its views on transgender issues. The Communist Party of Britain affirmed support for transgender rights in response.

In April 2025, the party and the Young Communist League both stated support for the Supreme Court ruling that a woman was defined by "biological sex", and affirmed the ruling's importance in creating safe spaces for women.

=== Attitudes towards current events ===
==== Russo-Ukrainian War ====
The party has described the Russo-Ukrainian War as an "ongoing capitalist conflict". It is strongly opposed to the "20-year long eastwards march of NATO", and decries the organisation for having "bombed or invaded Afghanistan, Serbia, Kosovo, Iraq, Libya, Yemen and Syria in the name of peace, democracy and Western values” whilst "also aiding and abetting the Israeli mass extermination of defenseless Palestinian civilians in Gaza”. It believes the United Kingdom should:

- Withdraw from NATO
- Refuse to increase military spending
- Spend aid to Ukraine on social programmes

It criticises the banning of the Ukrainian Communist Party and demands the restoration of "democratic rights" in Ukraine, whilst also being critical of "US and Russian attempts to carve up Ukraine's rich natural resources".

== Organisation ==
The Communist Party describes itself as a "disciplined and democratic organisation" and operates on a model of democratic centralism.

When initially established, the group adopted the constitution originally used by the CPGB.

The basic party body is the branch. These are normally localities (towns or counties, for example), although workplace branches also exist. In England, branches are grouped into coherent geographical areas and send delegates to a biennial District Congress which elects a District Committee for its area. Similarly, the Welsh and Scottish branches send delegates to their own national congresses where each elects an executive committee. These congresses also decide the broad perspectives for party activity within their districts and nations.

The all-Britain national congress is also held biennially. Delegates from districts, nations and branches themselves decide the party's policy as a whole and elect an executive committee (EC) that carries out a presidium-like function, including decision-making and policy-formation whilst congress is not in session.

The EC also elects a Political Committee (PC) to provide leadership when the EC is not meeting. Advisory Committees also exist to provide in-depth information on an array of subjects, including committees dedicated to women, industrial workers, pensions, public services, education workers, economics, housing, rails, science technology and the environment, transport, Marxist–Leninist education, LGBT rights, anti-racism, anti-fascism, civil service and international affairs.

=== Young Communist League ===
Logo of the Young Communist League

The YCL is the autonomous youth group of the Communist Party, with its own internal organisation. It carries out work alongside the party, while maintaining its own branches, activities, and events such as an annual summer camp. Young members of the party are automatically enrolled into the youth wing, however membership of both organisations is not synonymous, as it is possible to independently join the YCL without joining the party. The league, like its party, operates on a model of democratic centralism.

=== Coordinating Committee of Communist Parties in Britain ===
The Coordinating Committee is a bureau within the Communist Party which meets with communist parties that have significant memberships in Britain. These include parties from Bangladesh, Britain, Chile, Cyprus, Greece, Guyana, India, Iran, Iraq, Palestine and Sudan.

== Electoral information ==
=== General election results ===
House of Commons of the United Kingdom
Election year	Leader	# of candidates	% of overall vote	# of total votes	# of seats won
1997	Mike Hicks	5	0.0%	911	0
2001	Robert Griffiths	6	0.0%	▲1,003	0
2005	Robert Griffiths	6	0.0%	▲1,124	0
2010	Robert Griffiths	6	0.0%	▼947	0
2015	Robert Griffiths	9	0.0%	▲1,229	0
2017	Robert Griffiths	Supported Labour			
2019	Robert Griffiths	Supported Labour			
2024	Robert Griffiths	14	0.0%	▲2,622	0

=== Symbolism on ballot slips ===
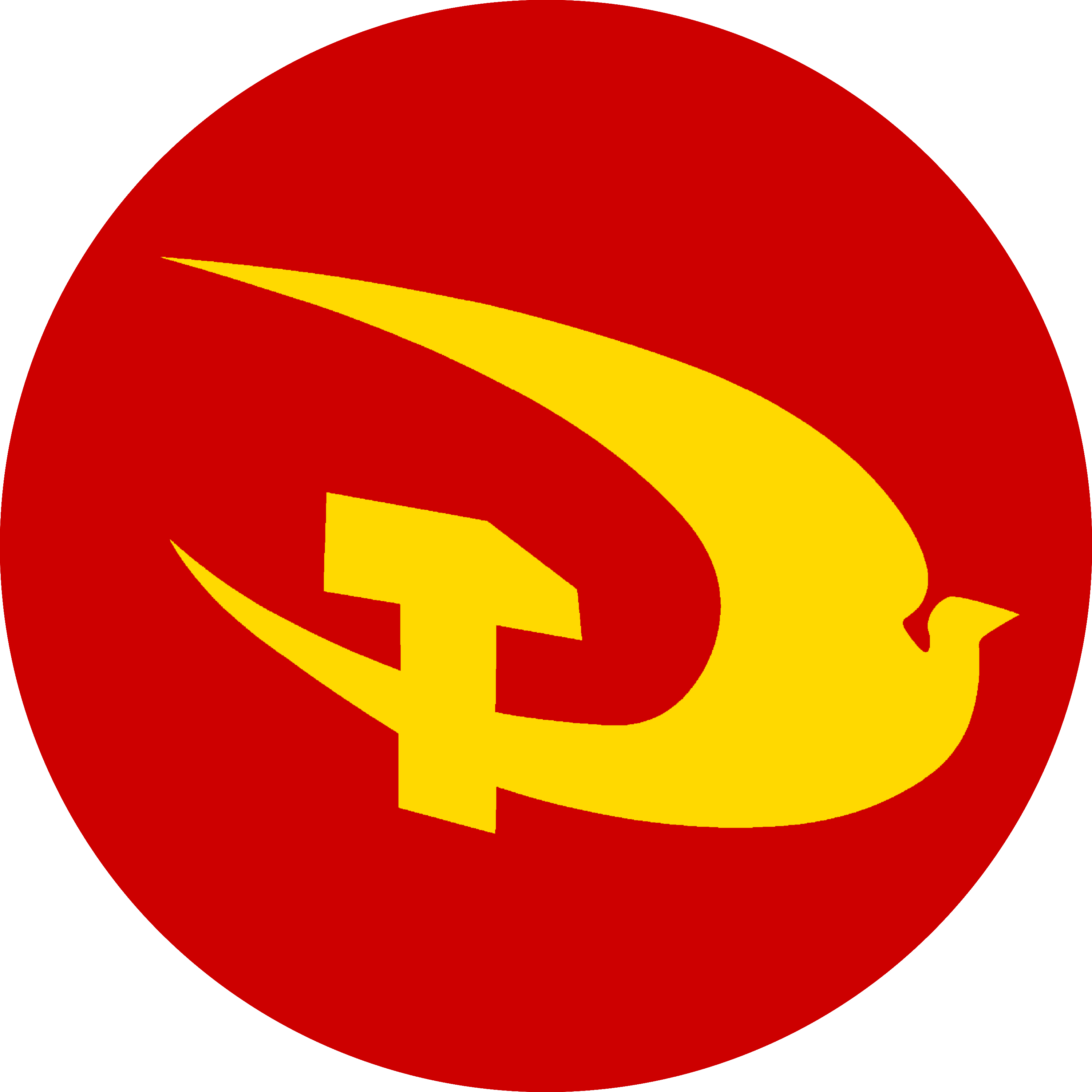
Hammer and Dove emblem used since 1988

Under the Registration of Political Parties Act 1998, which regulated the use of symbols on ballot slips and electoral material, the Communist Party is the only British political party entitled to use a stand-alone hammer and sickle in such cases. The party tends to use the hammer and dove (adopted when the party was re-established in 1988) in conjunction with the hammer and sickle in publications and on other material, with the hammer and dove normally taking primacy.

== Membership ==
Former members include Bob Crow of the RMT union, Ken Gill of the Manufacturing, Science and Finance (MSF) union, and Kate Hudson of the Campaign for Nuclear Disarmament (CND). Current members include Susan Michie, a member of the UK Government's Scientific Advisory Group for Emergencies and Independent SAGE advising on behavioural science measures during the COVID-19 pandemic.

=== Size ===
From 2006 to 2014, the party held a membership of over 900 members. In 2015, this figure dropped to below 800 members, although it has since recovered with growth in the Young Communist League. In 2018, there were 915 members of the CPB and YCL combined, and by 2019 it had increased to 1,011 members, At the 56th party congress in 2021 it was reported that the party had grown to over 1,200 members. As of 2022, the party maintains branches in most major cities. General Secretary, Robert Griffiths said in 2017 that CPB is organised in "just about every part of Britain".

By December 2023 the party had grown to 1,308 members, along with 500 members of the YCL (some of whom also hold party membership). In July 2023, the party claimed via Twitter that it had a membership number not seen since the 1980s.

The statement of accounts submitted to the Electoral Commission in 2023 reported a total annual income of £171,755.

=== Application ===
In order to join the party, applicants must pay a registration fee of £6. After this they will be contacted by the membership officer of their local branch to arrange an interview. Applicants must be 16 or over.

== Publications ==
The party publishes a wide variety of literature and material.

Communist Review
A theoretical and discussion journal published on a quarterly basis. It takes its name from the old journal published by the CPGB and is edited by Martin Levy. The content of the journal covers book reviews, feature articles, letters and sometimes poetry.

Communist Review Number 106 Winter 2022/23

Challenge
The magazine of the Young Communist League. It mainly covers news, feature articles and political reports. Each issue typically features 'Back 2 Basics', a series which explains the basic foundations of Marxism-Leninism in an accessible way. Occasionally it publishes music, film or video game reviews alongside other light content such as comic strips. It is aimed at young people and so is intended to be easier to read than Communist Review.

Communist Women
The bulletin of the Women's Commission, edited by the Women's Officer of the party. It features some content from SISTERS – the quarterly journal of the National Assembly of Women.

Communist News & Views
An irregular email bulletin which summarises the party's recent statements, resolutions, reports and policies. It also brings attention to campaigns and events being promoted by the party. The name is a reference to World News & Views – the internal newsletter of the CPGB.

Country Standard
A newspaper for rural communities, produced since March 1936. It is run by an editorial collective of Communist and Labour members, environmentalists and trade unionists. The paper supports the Countryside Charter. It is published annually, often to coincide with distribution at the Tolpuddle Martyrs' Festival. Otherwise it appears as an insert in the Morning Star.

Manifesto Press
The party publishes books under the Manifesto Press imprint. As of June 2019, it has a total catalogue of 25 titles and also sells 2 titles which are published separately by Hetherington Press. The books cover historical, political and social topics and are edited by Nick Wright. The party maintains another book publisher in Scotland called Praxis Press, which operates out of the Unity Books office in Glasgow.

Unity! and Solidarity
Unity! is a short booklet focused around labour issues and often distributed for free at trade union events. Solidarity is a bulletin published by the international department of the party, it covers the party's foreign policy and the activities of the Co-ordinating Committee of Communist Parties in Britain. The editor is Anita Halpin.

In addition to this the party publishes many pamphlets under its own name. The Classics of Communism series are reprints of classic works such as The Communist Manifesto or "Left-Wing" Communism: An Infantile Disorder. The Our History series aims to re-tell 'history from below' and covers historical events from a working class perspective. This series is a continuation of the work of the Communist Party Historians Group The party also publishes congress reports, the party programme, briefing notes and other documents.

== Headquarters ==
At the beginning of November 2004, the party and its youth organisation, the YCL, moved out of its temporary headquarters in Camden, North London after receiving notice to quit because of redevelopment. The building was owned by AKEL, the Cypriot communist party. Ruskin House in Croydon was chosen as the new party headquarters, with its long history in the progressive movement as centre of the Anti-Apartheid Movement and also local Labour Party and co-operative groups. The party rents the top floor of four offices at Ruskin House which also allows it plenty of room to hold its congresses and other important meetings, including an annual industrial cadre school and the Communist University of Britain. In Scotland, the party also makes use of an office in Glasgow.

== Conferences and festivals ==
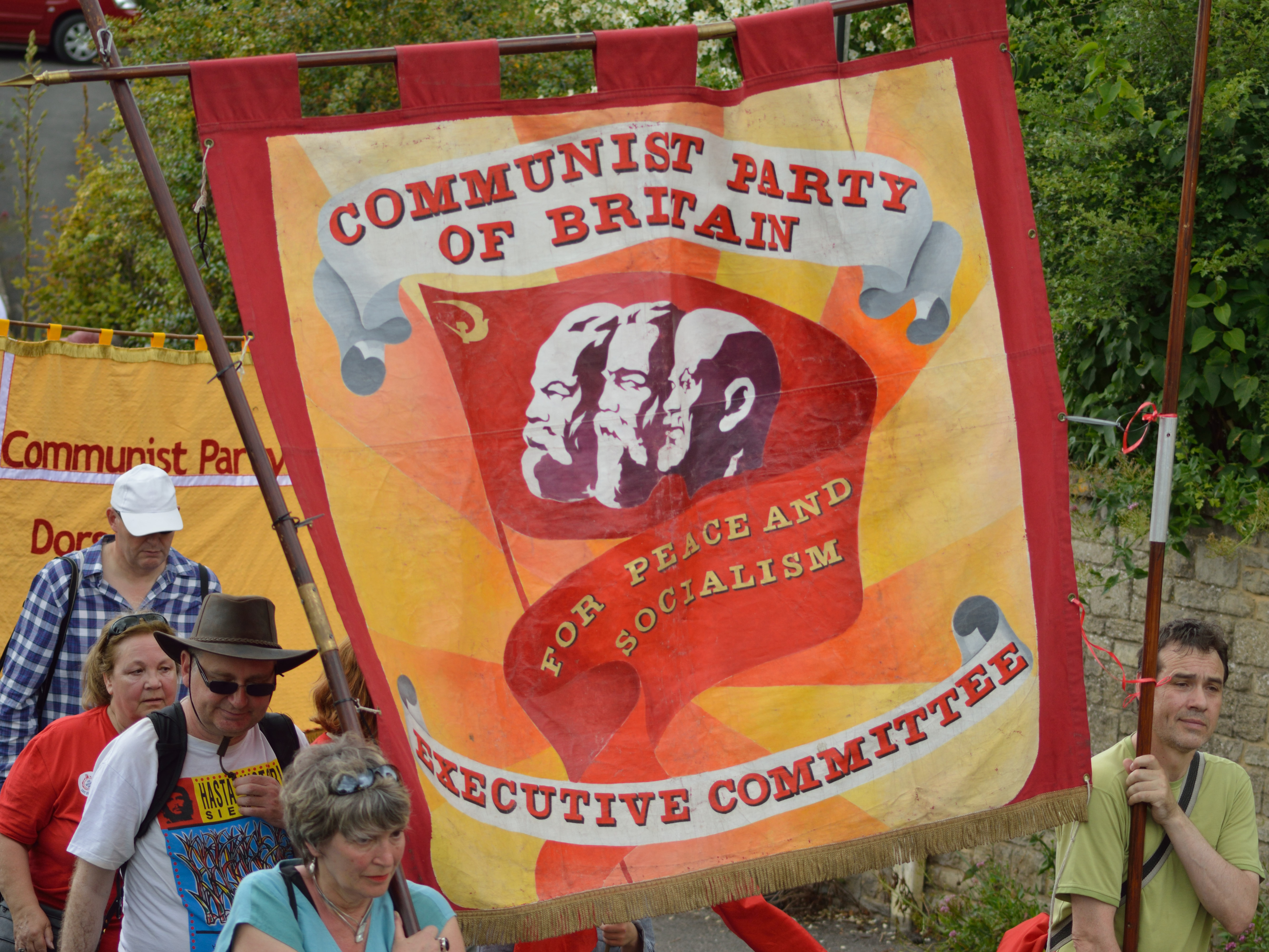
Executive Committee group in the 2016 Tolpuddle Martyrs' Rally

=== Congress ===
The party holds a biennial congress with delegates from districts, nations and branches. The last congress as the Communist Party of Great Britain was the 43rd congress and was held in 1991. The 44th congress, as the Communist Party of Britain, was held in 1997. Since 2000 the congress has been held every two years apart from a special congress held in February 2004. The 29 member governing Executive Committee (EC) of the party is elected at congress.

=== Events ===
In November 2004 the party organised Communist University events in Wales and England, these were further developed to form a national three-day event which ran annually from 2005 to 2010. This was accompanied by regional weekend universities in Wales, Scotland and the Midlands. Among the speakers at the Communist University at Ruskin House in November 2006 were Labour MP John McDonnell, RMT general secretary Bob Crow, CND chair Kate Hudson, Communist Party USA vice-president Jarvis Tyner, French Communist Party economist Paul Boccara and Palestine Liberation Organization ambassador Dr Noha Khalef.

=== 21st Century Marxism ===
In 2011, the national Communist University event was renamed to "21st Century Marxism" and the format was changed slightly from a festival to a conference. The style of the event has changed widely over the years as the organisers experiment with different venues and speakers.

Date	Venue
26 to 27 November 2011	Bishopsgate Institute
21 to 22 July 2012	Bishopsgate Institute
2 to 3 November 2013	Marx Memorial Library
26 to 27 July 2014	Marx Memorial Library

The party's political education strategy also includes trade union and political cadre schools, party-building schools and dayschools.

== General secretaries ==
General Secretary	Took office	Left office
Mike Hicks	1988	1998
Robert Griffiths	1998	2026
Alex Gordon	2026	

== Notable current and former members ==
- Susan Michie (1955), clinical psychologist, and professor of health psychology
- Bob Crow (1961–2014), former General Secretary of the National Union of Rail, Maritime and Transport Workers (RMT)
- Anita Halpin (1944), former President of the National Union of Journalists
- Graham Stevenson (1950–2020), former National secretary of the Transport and General Workers' Union
- Gawain Little (1980), current General-Secretary of the General Federation of Trade Unions
- Paul Cockshott (1952), economist
