= 1992 Special Honours =

British government recognitions

As part of the British honours system, Special Honours are issued at the Monarch's pleasure at any given time. The Special Honours refer to the awards made within royal prerogative, operational honours and other honours awarded outside the New Years Honours and Birthday Honours.

== Life Peer ==
=== Baronesses ===
- The Right Honourable Lynda Chalker.
- Margaret, Mrs. Jay, Director, The National Aids Trust.

=== Barons ===
- Jeffrey Howard Archer, Conservative M.P. for Louth, 1969-74. Deputy Chairman, Conservative Party, 1985-86.
- The Right Honourable Sir William Gibson Clark, former member, Conservative Backbench Finance Committee and formerly joint Deputy Chairman, Conservative Party Organisation.
- Victor Alexander Cooke, O.B.E., Chairman and Managing Director, Springvale EPS Ltd.
- John Leonard Eatwell, Economic Advisor to the Right Honourable Neil Kinnock, M.P., Leader of the Labour Party. Fellow, Trinity College, Cambridge.
- Sir Geoffrey Finsberg, M.B.E., former M.P. for Hampstead and Highgate. Member, Parliamentary Assembly of Council of Europe and W.E.U. Member, S.E. Regional Board, Trustee Savings Bank.
- The Right Honourable Sir Bernard John Barney Hayhoe, Member, Select Committee on Defence and Member, House of Commons Commission. Chairman Hansard Society.
- Professor Raymond Plant, Professor of Politics, University of Southampton.
- Alan Ferguson Rodger, QC
- The Right Honourable Sir Bernard Harold Ian Halley Stewart, lately M.P. for North Hertfordshire. Director, Seccombe Marshall & Campion Holdings Ltd. Director, Diploma pic. Director, Standard Chartered pic. Chairman, Throgmorton Trust.
- The Right Honourable John Wakeham
- Gareth Wyn Williams, Q.C., Recorder, Deputy High Court Judge. Chairman of The Bar Council.

== Privy Counsellor ==
- Virginia Hilda Brunette Maxwell, Mrs. Bottomley, MP
- Sir Simon Denis Brown
- Sir Anthony Howell Meurig Evans
- Sir David Cozens-Hardy Hirst
- Sir Leonard Hubert Hoffmann
- The Honourable Douglas Martin Hogg, QC, MP
- Michael Denzil Xavier Portillo, MP
- Alan Ferguson Rodger, QC
- Sir Christopher Dudley Roger Rose
- Gillian Patricia, Mrs. Shephard, MP
- Jean Alys Barker, Baroness Trumpington.

== Knight Bachelor ==
- Derek Harold Spencer, QC, MP

== Companion of Honour ==
- The Right Honourable Kenneth Wilfred Baker, MP
- The Right Honourable Peter Leonard Brooke, MP
- The Right Honourable Thomas Jeremy King, MP

== Royal Victorian Order ==
=== Knight Commander of the Royal Victorian Order (KCVO) ===
- Michael David Tims, C.V.O.

=== Commander of the Royal Victorian Order (CVO) ===
- Stanley William Frederick Martin, L.V.O.

=== Lieutenant of the Royal Victorian Order (LVO) ===
- Marcus Ernest Bishop, M.V.O.

== Most Excellent Order of the British Empire ==
Ribbon bar of the Order of the British Empire (Civil)

=== Dame Commander of the Order of the British Empire (DBE) ===
- The Right Honourable Angela Claire Rosemary, Mrs. Rumbold, CBE, MP

=== Commander of the Order of the British Empire (CBE) ===
Military Division

Royal Navy

- Brigadier Andrew Myles Keeling, O.B.E.

=== Officer of the Order of the British Empire (OBE) ===
Royal Navy

- Lieutenant Colonel Christopher Graham Harrison Dunlop, Royal Marines.
- Lieutenant Colonel Andrew John Wentworth Higginson, M.B.E., Royal Marines.

Army

- Lieutenant Colonel Graham Leslie Kerr (4884SS), Royal Regiment of Artillery.
