= No2EU =

Left-wing Eurosceptic electoral alliance in the United Kingdom

- Leader: Bob Crow
- Founded: 19 March 2009
- Ideology: Euroscepticism; Socialism
- Political position: Left-wing
- Colours: Dark grey
- Slogan: Yes to Workers' Rights
- Members: National Union of Rail, Maritime and Transport Workers; Alliance for Green Socialism; Communist Party of Britain; Indian Workers' Association; Liberal Party; Socialist Party; Solidarity

Website
- www.tuaeu.co.uk

No2EU is a left-wing Eurosceptic electoral alliance (Note: For legal reasons the No2EU alliance is registered as a political party in its own right.) in the United Kingdom. It was founded in 2009 when it campaigned under the campaign slogan No2EU — Yes to Democracy; it was led by Bob Crow and backed by the National Union of Rail, Maritime and Transport Workers (RMT), who provided most of its funding, the Communist Party of Britain and Solidarity among others. It participated in the 2009 European Parliament elections and the European elections in 2014 with the party name "No2EU" and the campaign slogan No2EU — Yes to Workers' Rights.

The organisation is now known as Trade Unionists Against the EU.

== Summary of main policies ==
No2EU's declared position is for a Europe of "democratic states that value public services and does not offer them to profiteers; a Europe that guarantees the rights of workers and does not put the interests of big business above that of ordinary people". This, it contested, is impossible within the current European Union structure and it calls for a withdrawal from the EU. In keeping with its socialist position it campaigns for public ownership of some national industries and investment in public services.

It is hostile to fascist politics, acting as an 'internationalist alternative' to the perceived xenophobic positions of existing far-right eurosceptic parties. Tensions arising from the free movement of labour are explained as an economic issue, for example Bob Crow stated that he was against "two workers from different countries competing against each other on different rates of pay".

== History ==
No2EU – Yes to Democracy was initiated by the RMT to contest the June 2009 European Parliament elections. In addition to the RMT, the coalition included:

- Alliance for Green Socialism
- Communist Party of Britain
- Indian Workers' Association
- Liberal Party
- Socialist Party
- Solidarity

This was notable as the first instance in recent history of a British trade union officially putting its support behind a national electoral presence other than the Labour Party, though the RMT had set some precedent in Scotland when it backed the Scottish Socialist Party.

=== 2009 European Parliament election ===
No2EU received 153,236 votes or 1% of the national vote, winning no seats and finishing in 11th place behind Arthur Scargill's Socialist Labour Party. The alliance only fielded candidates in Great Britain, none in Northern Ireland. The regional breakdown of the vote was as follows:

Constituency	Candidates	Votes	%
East Midlands	John McEwan, Avtar Sadiq, Jean Thorpe, Shangara Singh Gahonia, Laurence Platt	11,375	0.9
East of England	Brian Denny, Frank Jepson, Steve Glennon, Phil Katz, Eleanor Donne, Pete Relph, Ron Rodwell	13,939	0.9
London	Bob Crow, John Hendy, Mary Davis, Kevin Nolan, Syed Islam, Onay Kasab, John Rowe, Nick Wrack	17,758	1.0
North East England	Martin Levy, Hannah Walter, Peter Pinkney	8,066	1.4
North West England	Roger Bannister, Les Skarrot, Craig Johnston, Alec McFadden, Steve Radford, Lynn Worthington, John Metcalfe, Harry Smith	23,580	1.4
South East England	Dave Hill, Garry Hassell, Kevin Hayes, Owen Morris, Gawain Little, Robert Wilkinson, Jacqui Berry, Nick Wright, Nick Chaffey, Sarah Wrack	21,455	0.9
South West England	Alex Gordon, Roger Davey, Rachel Lynch, Nick Quirk, John Chambers, Paul Dyer	9,741	0.6
West Midlands	David Nellist, Dyal Singh Bagri, Malcolm Gribbin, Jo Stevenson, Peter MacLaren, Andy Chaffer	13,415	1.0
Yorkshire and the Humber	Keith Gibson, Celia Foote, Jackie Grunsell, Peter March, Mike Davies, Juliet Marie Boddington	15,614	1.3
Scotland	John Foster, Tommy Sheridan, Leah Ganley, Stuart Hyslop, Ajit Singh Uppal, Tom Morrison	9,693	0.9
Wales	Robert Griffiths, Rob Williams, Laura Picand, Trevor Jones	8,600	1.3
Total		153,236	1.0

After the election, activity dwindled and the campaign was statutorily de-registered by the Electoral Commission on 2 November 2010.

=== 2014 European Parliament election ===
On 16 October 2013, the campaign re-registered with the Electoral Commission, consisting of an alliance of the RMT, the Socialist Party and the Communist Party of Britain, ready to contest the 2014 European Parliament election. For 2014, the slate used the party name of "No2EU" and the campaign slogan No2EU – Yes to workers' rights.

No2EU – Yes to Workers' Rights stood 46 candidates in seven regions in the 22 May euro election including London, North West, Eastern, Wales, Scotland, Yorks and Humber and West Midlands.

The candidates were as follows:

Constituency	Candidates	Votes	%
East of England	Brian Denny, Eleanor Donne, Steve Glennon, David Goode, Leonardo Impett, Teresa MacKay, Emily Thompson-Golding	4,870	0.3
London	Edward Dempsey, Alex Gordon, April Ashley, Annie Ngemi, Mary Davis, Paula Mitchell, Natasha Hoarau, Michael Carty	3,804	0.2
North West England	Roger Bannister, George Waterhouse, Jacqueline Grunsell, John Metcalfe, George Tapp, Mark Rowe, James Healy, Kevin Morrison	5,402	0.3
West Midlands	Dave Nellist, Pat Collins, Joanne Stevenson, Sophia Hussain, Paul Reilly, Andy Chaffer, Amanda Marfleet	4,653	0.3
Yorkshire and the Humber	Trevor Howard, Mary Jackson, Carrie Hedderwick, Adrian O'Malley, Steven Andrew, Iain Dalton	3,807	0.3
Scotland	John Foster, Andrew Elliot, Murdo Maclean, Gail Morrow, Brian Smith, Ritchie Veitch	6,418	0.5
Wales	Robert Griffiths, Claire Job, Steve Skelly, Laura Picand	2,803	0.4
Total		31,757	0.2

No2EU deregistered as a political party on 1 November 2014. It did not contest the 2019 European Parliament elections.

=== European Parliament ===
European Parliament
Election year	# of total votes	% of overall vote	# of seats won	Rank
2009	153,236 ▲	1.0% ▲	0 / 72	13 ▲
2014	31,757 ▼	0.19% ▼	0 / 73	18 ▼
