= Alex Gordon (communist) =

British political activist and trade unionist

3rd General Secretary of the Communist Party of Britain
- Incumbent
- Assumed office 17 January 2026
- Preceded by: Robert Griffiths

President of RMT
- In office 2010–2013
- Preceded by: John Leach
- Succeeded by: Peter Pinkney

Personal details
- Born: September 1966 (age 60)
- Party: Communist Party of Britain

Alexander Gordon (born September 1966) is a British political activist and trade unionist.

Gordon worked as a train driver based at Paddington railway station. He joined the RMT trade union, becoming secretary of its Paddington No.1 branch. He was elected as president of the union in 2010, serving until 2012, and was elected in 2021 for a second term.

Gordon stood unsuccessfully in South West England in the 2009 European Parliament election for No2EU. He was also unsuccessful when he topped the list for the Trade Union and Socialist Coalition in the 2012 London Assembly election.

Gordon joined the Communist Party of Britain, and in 2026 was elected as its general secretary. He is also a member of the steering committee of the Stop the War Coalition, and a former chair of the Marx Memorial Library.

Party political offices
| Preceded by Robert Griffiths | General Secretary of the Communist Party of Britain; 2026–present | Incumbent |
Trade union offices
| Preceded by John Leach | President of the National Union of Rail, Maritime and Transport Workers; 2010–2012 | Succeeded by Peter Pinkney |
| Preceded by Michelle Rodgers | President of the National Union of Rail, Maritime and Transport Workers; 2022–2024 | Succeeded by George Welch |
