= Mike Hicks (trade unionist) =

British trade unionist and communist politician (1937–2017)

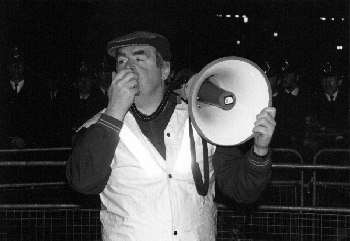
- Mike Hicks in 1986

1st General Secretary of the Communist Party of Britain
- In office 1 January 1988 – 1 January 1998
- Succeeded by: Robert Griffiths

Personal details
- Born: Michael Joseph Hicks; 1 August 1937
- Died: 7 September 2017 (aged 80) Bournemouth, Dorset, England
- Party: Labour
- Other political affiliations: Communist Party of Britain (1988–1998); Communist Party of Great Britain (1953–1988)
- Spouse(s): Rosemary Hicks (divorced), Mary Rosser-Hicks (1989–2010, deceased)
- Relations: Pat Hicks (brother) (1934-2011)
- Children: 2

Michael Joseph Hicks (1 August 1937 – 7 September 2017) was a British politician, executive member of printers’ union SOGAT, and general secretary of the Communist Party of Britain.

== Career ==
Hicks joined the Young Communist League in 1953 and later the Communist Party of Great Britain. He worked as a printer and was a member of the Society of Graphical and Allied Trades (SOGAT). A full-time branch official for the union in 1986, Hicks was arrested and convicted of actual bodily harm during the Wapping dispute. His conviction and sentencing to 12 months in prison were controversial, with the national executive committee of the Labour Party voting unanimously to call for his release. He was expelled from the CPGB in 1984 "for allowing Rule 3(d) to be applied" as the chair of the London District Congress, i.e. continuing with the congress proceedings in defiance of a demand from CPGB General Secretary Gordon McLennan to close it down.

He subsequently joined the Communist Campaign Group, mainly composed of those expelled from the CPGB for their opposition to revisionism and, in 1988, was a founding member of the Communist Party of Britain. Hicks served as its general secretary until his replacement by Robert Griffiths in 1998, which led to an industrial dispute at the Morning Star, and subsequently left the party and helped to form the Marxist Forum group. He served as the trade union officer of the London-based Marx Memorial Library from 2005 to 2010. He joined the Labour Party, and unsuccessfully stood, as a council election candidate in the Boscombe East ward of Bournemouth on 5 May 2011, gaining 514 votes.

== Family ==
Hicks's second wife, Mary Rosser-Hicks (8 May 1937 – 3 November 2010) was Chief Executive of the Morning Star between 1975 and 1998, and Chair of the Marx Memorial Library for most of 1977 to 2010. A former catholic, she challenged the monopolisation of newspaper distribution, and helped to establish a diversity and pluralism campaign alongside supporters such as Ken Livingstone and Peter Bottomley.

His elder brother, Patrick John Hicks (1 November 1934 - 29 September 2011), was the former Chairman of the Poole Labour Party. A former taxi driver and unionist, he stood in both the 2007 and 2011 borough council elections, gaining 223 and 349 votes respectively.

== Death ==
Hicks died at age 80 on the evening of 7 September 2017 after collapsing while accepting the position of Honorary President of Bournemouth Labour Party at its annual general meeting.

Party political offices
Preceded by New position	General Secretary of the Communist Party of Britain; 1988–1998	Succeeded by Robert Griffiths
