= David Lepper =

British politician (born 1945)

Member of Parliament for Brighton Pavilion
- In office 1 May 1997 – 12 April 2010
- Preceded by: Derek Spencer
- Succeeded by: Caroline Lucas

Personal details
- Born: 15 September 1945 (age 81) Richmond, Surrey, London, United Kingdom
- Party: Labour Co-op
- Education: University of Kent; University of Sussex; University of Westminster

David Lepper (born 15 September 1945) is a British Labour and Co-operative politician who was the Member of Parliament (MP) for Brighton Pavilion from 1997 to 2010.

== Non-political life ==
Lepper was educated at the University of Kent where he took a degree in English and American literature. He also has a PGCE qualification from the University of Sussex and a Postgraduate Diploma in Film from the Polytechnic of Central London. Prior to his election to parliament Lepper worked as a secondary school English and Media Studies teacher at Westlain Grammar School and Falmer High School, both in Brighton. Lepper is married to Jeane (born Jeane Stroud); they have one son and one daughter.

On 24 July 2012, David Lepper was conferred the honorary degree of Master of Laws from the University of Brighton.

== Politics ==
Lepper was the first Labour leader of Brighton Borough Council, and Mayor in 1993–94. His wife Jeane is a former mayor and councillor within the Labour group on Brighton and Hove Council. In parliament, Lepper chaired the Broadcasting select committee. Lepper supported the building of the new stadium for Brighton & Hove Albion FC.

In 2006, he announced that he would be standing down at the next general election.

Parliament of the United Kingdom
Preceded by Derek Spencer	Member of Parliament for Brighton Pavilion; 1997–2010	Succeeded by Caroline Lucas
