= Peter Pinkney =

British trade unionist (born 1956)

Peter Pinkney (born 1956) is a British trade unionist, who served as President of the National Union of Rail, Maritime and Transport Workers (RMT) from December 2012 until 2015.

Born in Saltburn, Pinkney completed an apprenticeship as a welder and joined the Amalgamated Society of Boilermakers. He found employment at a steelworks in Middlesbrough, and became a junior shop steward. However, when the works closed in 1978, he was unable to find a new job in the industry and instead joined the Royal Navy, serving as a submariner.

Following a five-year stint in the Navy, Pinkney studied at a polytechnic, and joined the Communist Party of Great Britain. He found work as a railway signalman, working in the world's oldest signal box, in Stockton-on-Tees. He also joined the National Union of Railwaymen, which later became part of the RMT. Pinkney became first a union representative, then branch secretary and regional secretary.

Pinkney's union involvement further increased following the election of Bob Crow as general secretary, and culminated with Pinkney's election as president in 2012; the highest lay official of the union. As President, Pinkney pledged that the RMT "will fight for the abolition of capitalism and replace it with a socialist system". During Pinkney's time as president, Crow died unexpectedly, and Pinkney took his place on the General Council of the Trades Union Congress.

In February 2015, Pinkney confirmed that he would be standing as a Green Party candidate in Redcar in the 2015 general election. In the election he came fifth of six candidates with 2.2% of the vote.

In February 2016, Pinkney signed a letter in The Guardian alongside Sean Hoyle, Paul McDonnell and John Reid from the National Union of Rail, Maritime and Transport Workers (RMT), in which they voiced their opposition to the Electoral Commission choosing Leave.EU, Vote Leave or Grassroots Out as the official group advocating for the UK's withdrawal from the European Union in the 2016 referendum on the subject. The letter said that:

We call on the commission not to give taxpayers' money to the Tory and Ukip-dominated Vote Leave, Leave.EU or Grassroots Out campaigns, or any amalgam of them ... We believe there are millions of trade unionists, young people, anti-austerity campaigners and working-class voters, whose opposition to the big business-dominated EU would not be represented by these organisations. ... We call on the Electoral Commission to recognise that a significant proportion of those who will vote against the EU do so because they support basic socialist policies of workers' rights, public ownership, and opposition to austerity and racism.

Trade union offices
Preceded by Alex Gordon	President of the National Union of Rail, Maritime and Transport Workers; 2012 – 2015	Succeeded by Sean Hoyle
