= Robert Griffiths (politician) =

Leader of the Communist Party of Britain

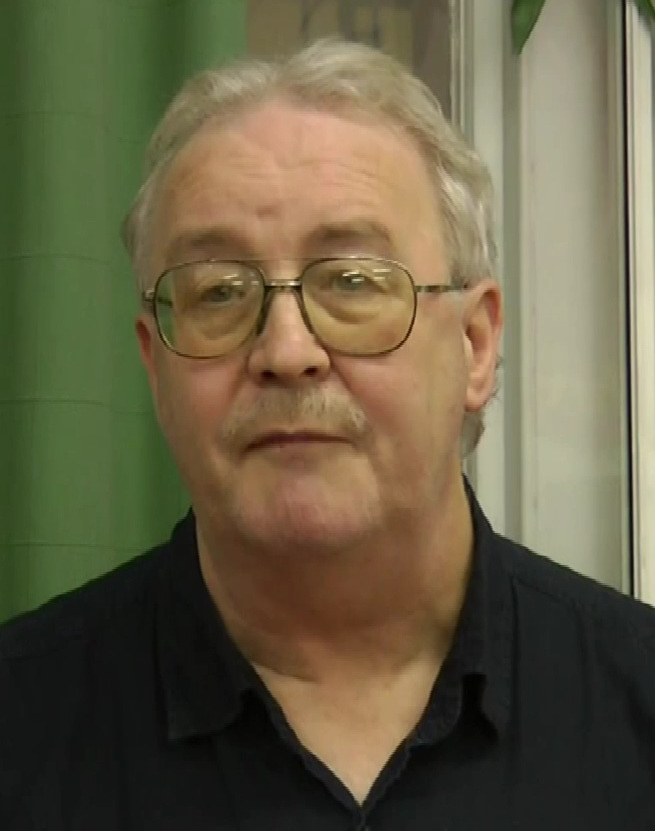
- Griffiths in 2011

2nd General Secretary of the Communist Party of Britain
- In office 1 January 1998 – 17 January 2026
- Preceded by: Mike Hicks
- Succeeded by: Alex Gordon

Leader of the Welsh Socialist Republican Movement
- In office 1979–1982

Personal details
- Born: Robert David Griffiths; 21 April 1952 (age 74) Cardiff, Wales
- Party: Communist Party of Britain
- Other political affiliations: Plaid Cymru (1974–1978); Welsh Socialist Republican Movement (1979–1982); Communist Party of Great Britain (until 1988)

Robert David Griffiths (born 21 April 1952) is a Welsh communist activist and the former general secretary of the Communist Party of Britain. He was elected by the party's executive committee in January 1998 to replace Mike Hicks.

== Personal life ==
Griffiths was born in Cardiff and grew up in the suburb of Llanrumney, where he attended Bryn Hafod primary school. Afterwards he attended Cardiff High School, and later went to the University of Bath to study economics. While at university he competed in boxing tournaments.

His home in Caerleon was flooded during Storm Bert in November 2024, forcing him into temporary accommodation for several months.

== Career ==
Griffiths joined Plaid Cymru in 1973, after being impressed by Emrys Roberts' campaign in the Merthyr Tydfil by-election. The following year in 1974, he began to work for Plaid Cymru as a parliamentary research officer. He stayed in the post until December 1979; it was a difficult year for the party, which had faced defeat in the Welsh devolution referendum and the loss of Gwynfor Evans' seat in the general election. With a reduced presence in Westminster (going from three seats to two) Griffiths was made redundant.

In July 1979 he collaborated with Gareth Miles to publish Socialism for the Welsh People, a pamphlet which was critical of Plaid Cymru for its "opportunism" and alleged subservience to the British state. The pamphlet called for the creation of a Welsh Socialist Republican Movement, which was founded by Griffiths, Miles and others in January 1980. Griffiths served as the organisation's secretary and wrote for its magazine 'the Arrow' (Welsh: Y Saeth).

During George Galloway's attempt to be selected as the Labour candidate for Rhondda in the 1983 general election, Griffiths brought him along to events and introduced him to local people. However, Galloway failed to win the selection, and instead Allan Rogers stood as the Labour candidate. Rogers became the seat's MP.

The WSRM was investigated by the police in relation to a bombing campaign and several of its members were arrested, including Robert Griffiths. However, when the case was brought to trial in November 1983, Griffiths was found not guilty of all charges. Partly as a result of these events, the Welsh Socialist Republican Movement dissolved. Griffiths joined the Communist Party of Great Britain shortly afterwards.

He has also previously served as Welsh president of the AUEW-TASS union.

Griffiths was a speaker at the first Communist University in Wales, and he speaks regularly at national events of the Communist Party of Britain. He has also taken part in debates at the Oxford Union, Cambridge Union Society and Manchester Debating Union. In February 2013, Griffiths was among those who gave their support to the People's Assembly in a letter published by The Guardian newspaper. He continues to be an active supporter of the People's Assembly nationally and is also active in his local People's Assembly in Cardiff.

In 2016, Griffiths was unveiled as the chair of Left Leave, a campaign for the United Kingdom's withdrawal from the European Union. The group was a coalition of political parties and organisations such as the Communist Party of Britain, the National Union of Rail, Maritime and Transport Workers and the Respect Party.

At the 58th Communist Party congress in November 2025, Griffiths announced his intention to step down from the General Secretary role. In January 2026, former RMT president Alex Gordon was elected to the position as Griffiths' replacement.

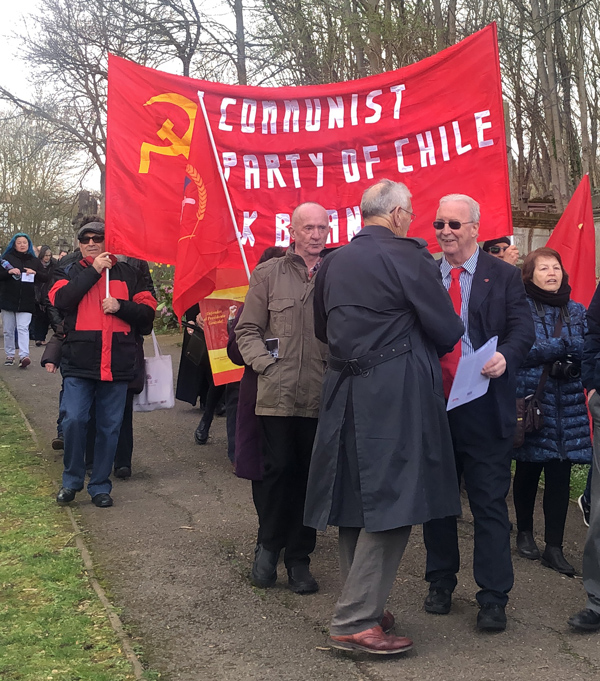
Robert Griffiths (right) at the annual Marx Oration at Highgate Cemetery

== Elections contested ==
=== European Parliament ===
In the 1994 election, he stood on behalf of the Communist Party in the single-member South Wales Central constituency, winning 1,073 votes or 0.6% of the total. Later on, in the 2009 and 2014 elections, he stood as part of the No2EU electoral list in the multi-member Wales constituency.

=== UK Parliament ===
All these elections were contested on behalf of the Communist Party.

Election	Constituency	Votes	%
1997	Pontypridd	178	0.4
2001	Newport East	173	0.6
2005	Pontypridd	233	0.6
2010	Cardiff South & Penarth	196	0.4
2012	Cardiff South & Penarth	213	1.1
2015	Merthyr Tydfil & Rhymney	186	0.6
2024	Blaenau Gwent & Rhymney	309	1.0

=== Senedd ===
Griffiths was a candidate on behalf of the Communist Party in the new Caerdydd Penarth super-constituency for the 2026 Senedd election.

=== Local elections ===
In 2008, he stood for the Splott ward of Cardiff council, winning 127 votes, or 3.4% of the total.

== Selected publications ==
- Socialism for the Welsh People [Sosialaeth i'r Cymry] (PDF). Cardiff: Y Faner Goch. 1979. ASIN B0018TWNI4. OCLC 656712405. Archived (PDF) from the original on 22 September 2019.
- Turning to London: Labour's Attitude to Wales 1898–1956 (PDF). Abertridwr: Y Faner Goch. c. 1980. OCLC 940163761.
- S.O. Davies – a socialist faith. Llandysul: Gomer. 1983. ISBN 0850888875. OL 3242844M.
- Was Gramsci a Eurocommunist?. Cardiff Marxist Forum. 1985.
- Streic! Streic! Streic!. Gwasg Taf. 1986. ISBN 0948469021. OL 4826101W.
- Driven by ideals – a history of ASLEF. 2005. ASIN B001C72MGU.
- Killing no murder: South Wales and the Great Railway Strike of 1911. Manifesto Press. 2009. ISBN 978190746401-0.
- Which Road for China?. Communist Party of Great Britain. 2011. ISBN 9781908315076.
- Britain Needs Public Ownership. Morning Star. 2012.
- Granite and Honey. Manifesto Press. 2012. ISBN 9781907464096.
- The EU, Brexit and class politics. Communist Party of Britain. February 2018.

Party political offices
Preceded by Mike Hicks	General Secretary of the Communist Party of Britain; 1998–2026	Succeeded by Alex Gordon
New post	Leader of the WSRM	Post abolished
