= Derek Spencer =

British politician (1936–2023)

Sir Derek Spencer KC

Solicitor General for England and Wales
- In office 15 April 1992 – 2 May 1997
- Prime Minister: John Major
- Preceded by: Nicholas Lyell
- Succeeded by: Lord Falconer of Thoroton

Member of Parliament for Brighton Pavilion
- In office 9 April 1992 – 8 April 1997
- Preceded by: Julian Amery
- Succeeded by: David Lepper

Member of Parliament for Leicester South
- In office 9 June 1983 – 18 May 1987
- Preceded by: Jim Marshall
- Succeeded by: Jim Marshall

Personal details
- Born: 31 March 1936 Clitheroe, England
- Died: 19 May 2023 (aged 87)
- Party: Conservative
- Spouses: Joan Nutter (m. 1960, divorced); Caroline Pärn (m. 1988; died 2003)
- Children: 4
- Education: Keble College, Oxford

Sir Derek Harold Spencer KC (31 March 1936 – 19 May 2023) was a British barrister and Conservative politician. He was Member of Parliament for Leicester South from 1983 to 1987 and for Brighton Pavilion from 1992 to 1997. During his latter term in Parliament, he was also Solicitor General for England and Wales.

== Education and career ==
Born in Clitheroe, Lancashire, on 31 March 1936, he was educated at Clitheroe Royal Grammar School and Keble College, Oxford. He served as a lieutenant in the King's Own Royal Regiment from 1954 to 1956. He became a barrister in 1961 and took silk as a QC in 1980.

Spencer was a Master of the Bench, Gray's Inn. He became a bencher in 1991. After joining the chambers of Michael Havers, he was a barrister in the South Eastern Circuit.

== Political career ==
Spencer was elected councillor for the Highgate ward on Camden London Borough Council in 1978 and was re-elected in 1982, this time for Swiss Cottage. Spencer resigned from Camden council after he was elected as the Member of Parliament (MP) for the Leicester South constituency in the Conservative landslide of 1983, by just 7 votes — the smallest margin in the country. He lost the seat back to Labour in 1987.

Spencer was elected for the marginal Brighton Pavilion seat in 1992, when he was appointed Solicitor-General, and knighted in the 1992 Special Honours. The Daily Telegraph described his politics as "robustly right-wing".

As Solicitor General, he represented the government in several significant cases including Wingrove v UK (1997) about the application of blasphemy law under the Human Rights Act 1998.

In 1997, however, he was defeated by Labour's David Lepper by 13,181 votes on a 13.5% swing. He returned to his previous career.

== Memberships ==
- Ex officio Bar Council, 1992–1997
- Criminal Bar Association
- Northern Ireland Bar
- South Eastern Circuit

== Personal life and death ==
Spencer married Joan Nutter in 1960; they had three children and later divorced. He was then married to Caroline Pärn from 1988 until her death in 2003. They had one son.

Spencer died on 19 May 2023, at the age of 87.

Parliament of the United Kingdom
Preceded by Jim Marshall	Member of Parliament for Leicester South; 1983–1987	Succeeded by Jim Marshall
Preceded by Julian Amery	Member of Parliament for Brighton Pavilion; 1992–1997	Succeeded by David Lepper
Legal offices
Preceded by Nicholas Lyell	Solicitor General for England and Wales; 1992–1997	Succeeded by Charles Falconer
