= Thomas Skeffington-Lodge =

British politician

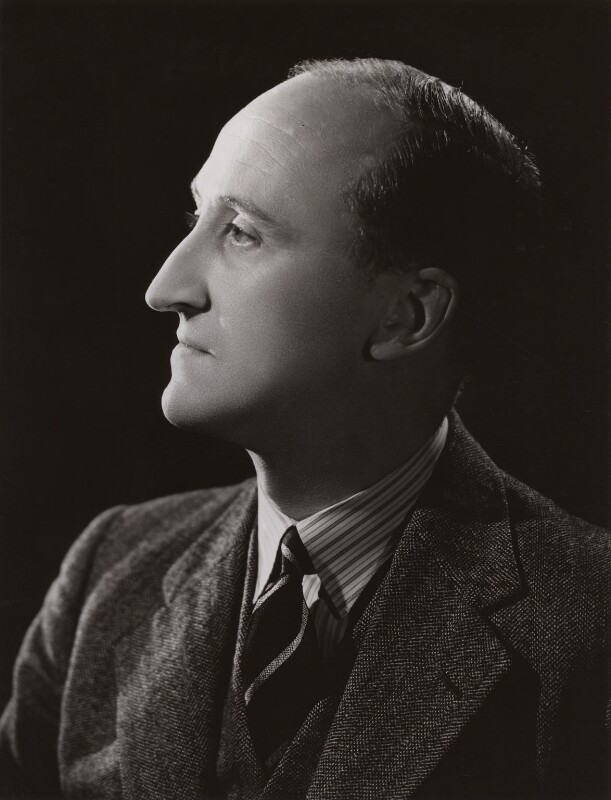
- Lodge

Member of Parliament for Bedford
- In office 1945-1950

Personal details
- Born: 15 January 1905
- Died: 23 February 1994
- Party: Labour

Thomas Cecil Skeffington-Lodge (15 January 1905 – 23 February 1994) was a British Labour Party politician. He was Member of Parliament (MP) for Bedford from 1945 to 1950.

== Family ==
Skeffington-Lodge was from a Yorkshire farming family which owned 2,000 acres. His mother, Winifred Skeffington, was a suffragette and his father, Thomas Lodge, from the famous Lodge family, American and British.

== Political career ==
Skeffington-Lodge fought Bedford at the 1945 general election and unexpectedly defeated the Conservative incumbent Richard Wells, by just 268 votes. He only served one term, however, before being beaten in 1950 by Winston Churchill's son-in-law Christopher Soames by 2108 votes.

Despite never gaining election to Parliament again, Skeffington-Lodge fought a number of other elections across the country in the Labour cause. At the 1951 general election he was beaten at York by just 921 votes. He went on to fight Mid Bedfordshire in 1955, Grantham in 1959 and Brighton Pavilion in a 1969 by-election.

== Outside politics ==
In 1969, he successfully sued novelist Francis King for libel, claiming that he had been caricatured as a female character in King's novel A Domestic Animal, which King was subsequently forced to re-edit with Skeffington-Lodge's involvement before publication.

== Sources ==
- Leigh Rayment's Historical List of MPs

Parliament of the United Kingdom
Preceded by Sir Richard Wells, Bt	Member of Parliament for Bedford; 1945 – 1950	Succeeded by Christopher Soames
