= Brighton Pavilion (constituency) =

Parliamentary constituency in the United Kingdom, 1950 onwards

Coordinates: 50.84°N 0.14°W

- Borough constituency for the House of Commons
- Boundaries since 2024
- Boundary of Brighton Pavilion in South East England
- County: East Sussex
- Population: 103,593 (2011 UK Census)
- Electorate: 75,722 (2023)
- Major settlements: Brighton

Current constituency
- Created: 1950
- Member of Parliament: Siân Berry (Green)
- Created from: Brighton

Brighton Pavilion is a constituency (Note: A borough constituency (for the purposes of election expenses and type of returning officer).) in East Sussex represented in the House of Commons of the UK Parliament since 2024 by Siân Berry of the Green Party. (Note: As with all constituencies, the constituency elects one Member of Parliament (MP) by the first past the post system of election at least every five years.)

At 11.9% of the population, Brighton Pavilion has the highest proportion of LGBTQ people in the country.

== Constituency profile ==
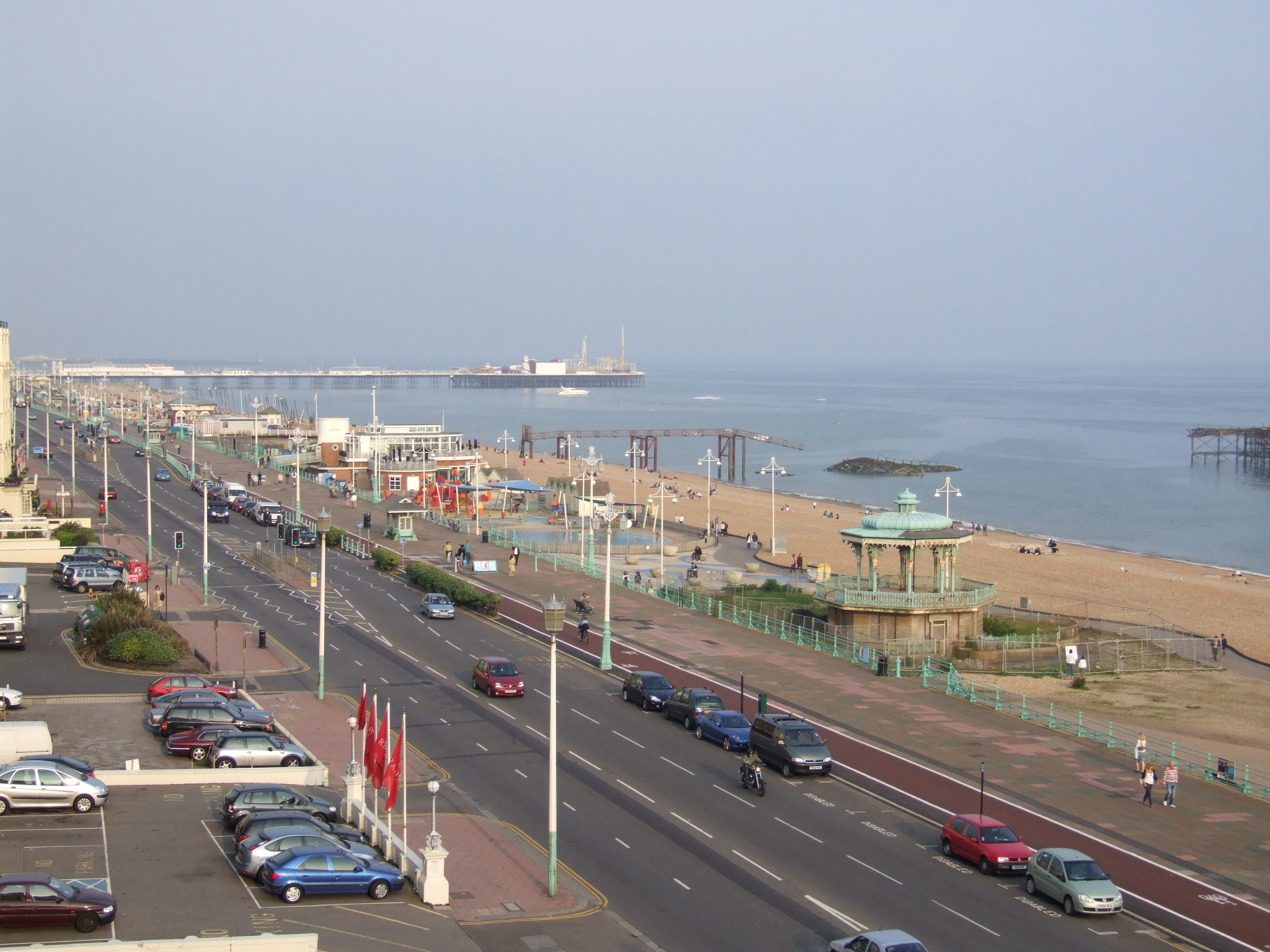
Brighton Pavilion beach and seafront with Brighton Pier, the border of Brighton Kemptown in distance

The Brighton Pavilion constituency is located in East Sussex on England's south coast. It includes the city centre of Brighton and the suburban areas to its north, including Patcham, Hollingdean and Coldean. The constituency is named after the Royal Pavilion, a royal residence built for the future King George IV located within the constituency. Brighton is a popular seaside resort and the Brighton Pavilion constituency contains the highest proportion of lesbian, gay or bisexual residents (11.9%) of any constituency in England and Wales.

Compared to national averages, residents are considerably younger and less religious and have high levels of education and professional employment. House prices and household income are generally higher than average, although there are some areas of high deprivation like Hollingdean, which has a large amount of social housing. The ethnic makeup of the constituency is similar to the country as a whole, with White people forming 85% of the population.

Local politics are mixed; at the city council, residents in city centre wards are represented by Green Party councillors, the more deprived areas around Hollingdean elected Labour Party councillors and Conservatives represent the outskirts near Patcham. In the 2016 referendum on European Union membership, voters in the constituency overwhelmingly supported remaining in the European Union with an estimated 83% voting for this option. This made Brighton Pavilion the second-most remain-supporting constituency in the United Kingdom.

== Boundaries ==
=== Historic ===
1950–1955: The County Borough of Brighton wards of Hollingbury, Montpelier, Patcham, Pavilion, Preston, Preston Park, Regency, St Nicholas, St Peters, and West.

1955–1983: The County Borough of Brighton wards of Hollingbury, Montpelier, Patcham, Preston, Preston Park, Regency, Stanmer, St Nicholas, and St Peter's.

1983–1997: The Borough of Brighton wards of Hollingbury, Patcham, Preston, Regency, St Peter's, Seven Dials, Stanmer, and Westdene.

1997–2010: The Borough of Brighton wards of Hanover, Hollingbury, Patcham, Preston, Regency, St Peter's, Seven Dials, Stanmer, and Westdene.

2010–2024: The City of Brighton and Hove wards of Hanover and Elm Grove, Hollingdean and Stanmer (called Hollingbury and Stanmer before 2011), Patcham, Preston Park, Regency, St Peter's and North Laine, and Withdean.

=== Current ===
Further to the 2023 review of Westminster constituencies which came into effect for the 2024 general election, the composition of the renamed constituency (based on the ward structure in place at 1 December 2020) was reduced slightly by transferring to Brighton Kemptown and Peacehaven part of the Hanover and Elm Grove ward – namely polling district PHEA, and that part of polling district PHEF to the east of Queen's Park Road.

Following a local government boundary review in Brighton and Hove which came into effect in May 2023, the constituency now comprises the following from the 2024 general election:

- Coldean & Stanmer (majority); Hanover & Elm Grove (most – see above); Hollingdean & Fiveways; Moulsecoomb & Bevendean (small part); Patcham & Hollingbury; Preston Park; Regency (nearly all); Round Hill; West Hill & North Laine; Westdene & Hove Park (part).

== Electoral history ==
The constituency was created in 1950 from the former two-member constituency of Brighton (one of the last remaining multi-member constituencies), for which Brighton Pavilion's first Member of Parliament, Sir William Teeling, had previously been the joint representative.

From 1950 to 1997, the seat elected Conservative MPs. In 1997, David Lepper of the Labour Party, aided by somewhat notionally favourable minor boundary changes before the 1997 general election, began service as MP for thirteen years by winning the two subsequent elections. The Conservatives' share of the vote has declined at every election there since 1979.

In July 2007, the Green Party selected Caroline Lucas to contest the seat, at which point she was a Member of the European Parliament for the South East England constituency. In November 2009, Charlotte Vere was selected as the Conservative Party candidate at an open primary attended by local Conservative Party members and residents. In January 2010, the Liberal Democrats also selected a female candidate, Bernadette Millam. Labour had selected Nancy Platts, a local campaigner and former union worker, as their candidate in June 2007. This meant that, distinctively, all of the four leading parties in the constituency had female candidates. In 2010, Labour's share of the vote fell by 6.5%, and Lucas, then leading the Green Party, won the seat. In contrast to national results, the Conservative and Liberal Democrat share of the vote fell.

Lucas retained the seat for the Green Party at the 2015 general election with an increased majority. Purna Sen, who held senior roles at the Commonwealth, LSE, and Amnesty International, was selected to contest the seat for Labour. Clarence Mitchell, a former BBC News reporter and spokesman for the family of Madeleine McCann, was selected as the Conservative Party candidate.

For the 2017 general election and the 2019 general election, the local Liberal Democrat party chose not to field a candidate in the seat, endorsing Lucas instead due to their shared pro-EU stance. Lucas retained Brighton Pavilion for the Green Party, which was returned with the biggest numerical majority for any candidate in the seat since 1959. In the 2019 election, the seat had the largest winning margin and the highest winning vote share of any seat not held by the Conservatives or Labour. Lucas announced on 8 June 2023, that she would not be standing in the subsequent UK general election. On 19 July 2023, the Green Party picked Siân Berry to replace her. Berry was elected as the MP for Brighton Pavilion at the 2024 election with a slightly reduced majority of 27%.

== Members of Parliament ==
Brighton prior to 1950

Election	Member	Party
1950	William Teeling	Conservative
1969 by-election	Julian Amery	Conservative
1992	Derek Spencer	Conservative
1997	David Lepper	Labour Co-op
2010	Caroline Lucas	Green
2024	Siân Berry	Green

== Election results ==

=== Elections in the 2020s ===
General election 2024: Brighton Pavilion
Party	Candidate	Votes	%	±%
Green	Siân Berry	28,809	55.0	−2.0
Labour	Tom Gray	14,519	27.7	+5.1
Conservative	Sarah Webster	3,975	7.6	−10.1
Reform	Mark Mulvihill	2,836	5.4	+4.1
Liberal Democrats	Ashley Ridley	1,604	3.1	N/A
Monster Raving Loony	Citizen Skwith	257	0.5	±0.0
SDP	Carl Buckfield	184	0.4	N/A
Independent	AI Steve	179	0.3	N/A
Rejected ballots		209		
Majority		14,290	27.3	−7.2
Turnout		52,363	70.0	−5.4
Registered electors		74,786		
Green hold		Swing	−3.5	

=== Elections in the 2010s ===
2019 notional result
Party	Vote	%
Green	32,575	57.0
Labour	12,945	22.7
Conservative	10,129	17.7
Brexit Party	762	1.3
Others	690	1.2
Turnout	57,101	75.4
Electorate	75,722	

General election 2019: Brighton Pavilion
Party	Candidate	Votes	%	±%
Green	Caroline Lucas	33,151	57.2	+4.9
Labour	Adam Imanpour	13,211	22.8	−4.0
Conservative	Emma Hogan	10,176	17.5	−1.7
Brexit Party	Richard Milton	770	1.3	N/A
Monster Raving Loony	Citizen Skwith	301	0.5	N/A
Independent	Bob Dobbs	212	0.4	N/A
UKIP	Nigel Furness	177	0.3	−0.8
Majority		19,940	34.4	+8.9
Turnout		57,998	73.4	−3.1
Registered electors		79,057		
Green hold		Swing	+4.5	

General election 2017: Brighton Pavilion
Party	Candidate	Votes	%	±%
Green	Caroline Lucas	30,149	52.3	+10.4
Labour	Solomon Curtis	15,450	26.8	−0.5
Conservative	Emma Warman	11,082	19.2	−3.6
UKIP	Ian Buchanan	630	1.1	−3.9
Independent	Nick Yeomans	376	0.7	+0.4
Majority		14,699	25.5	+10.9
Turnout		57,687	76.4	+5.0
Registered electors		75,486		
Green hold		Swing	+5.5	

General election 2015: Brighton Pavilion
Party	Candidate	Votes	%	±%
Green	Caroline Lucas	22,871	41.8	+10.5
Labour	Purna Sen	14,904	27.3	−1.7
Conservative	Clarence Mitchell	12,448	22.8	−0.9
UKIP	Nigel Carter	2,724	5.0	+3.2
Liberal Democrats	Chris Bowers	1,525	2.8	−11.0
Independent	Nick Yeomans	116	0.2	N/A
Socialist (GB)	Howard Pilott	88	0.2	N/A
Rejected ballots		194		
Majority		7,967	14.6	+12.2
Turnout		54,676	71.4	+1.4
Registered electors		76,557		
Green hold		Swing	+6.1	

General election 2010: Brighton Pavilion
Party	Candidate	Votes	%	±%
Green	Caroline Lucas	16,238	31.3	+10.5
Labour	Nancy Platts	14,986	28.9	−7.0
Conservative	Charlotte Vere	12,275	23.7	+0.4
Liberal Democrats	Berni Millam	7,159	13.8	−2.1
UKIP	Nigel Carter	948	1.8	+0.6
Socialist Labour	Ian Fyvie	148	0.3	−0.0
Citizens for Undead Rights and Equality	Soraya Kara	61	0.1	N/A
Independent	Leo Atreides	19	0.0	N/A
Rejected ballots		81	0.1	
Majority		1,252	2.4	N/A
Turnout		51,834	70.0	+6.3
Registered electors		74,009		
Green gain from Labour Co-op		Swing	+8.8	

=== Elections in the 2000s ===
2005 notional result
Party	Vote	%
Labour	15,955	35.9
Conservative	10,343	23.3
Green	9,252	20.8
Liberal Democrats	7,070	15.9
Others	1,799	4.1
Turnout	44,419	63.7
Electorate	69,699	

General election 2005: Brighton Pavilion
Party	Candidate	Votes	%	±%
Labour Co-op	David Lepper	15,427	35.4	−13.3
Conservative	Mike Weatherley	10,397	23.9	−1.2
Green	Keith Taylor	9,530	21.9	+12.5
Liberal Democrats	Hazel Thorpe	7,171	16.5	+3.3
UKIP	Kimberley Crisp-Comotto	508	1.2	+0.3
Alliance for Green Socialism	Tony Greenstein	188	0.4	N/A
Socialist Labour	Ian Fyvie	152	0.3	−1.1
Independent	Christopher Rooke	122	0.3	N/A
Independent	Keith Jago	44	0.1	N/A
Majority		5,030	11.5	−12.1
Turnout		43,580	63.9	+5.3
Registered electors		68,182		
Labour Co-op hold		Swing	−6.1	

General election 2001: Brighton Pavilion
Party	Candidate	Votes	%	±%
Labour Co-op	David Lepper	19,846	48.7	−5.9
Conservative	David Gold	10,203	25.1	−2.6
Liberal Democrats	Ruth Berry	5,348	13.1	+3.6
Green	Keith Taylor	3,806	9.3	+6.8
Socialist Labour	Ian Fyvie	573	1.4	N/A
Free Party	Bob Dobbs	409	1.0	+0.7
UKIP	Stuart Hutchin	361	0.9	+0.5
ProLife Alliance	Marie Paragallo	177	0.4	N/A
Majority		9,643	23.6	−3.2
Turnout		40,723	58.5	−14.8
Registered electors		69,568		
Labour Co-op hold		Swing	−1.6	

=== Elections in the 1990s ===
General election 1997: Brighton Pavilion
Party	Candidate	Votes	%	±%
Labour Co-op	David Lepper	26,737	54.6	+14.4
Conservative	Derek Spencer	13,556	27.7	−17.6
Liberal Democrats	Kenneth Blanshard	4,644	9.5	−2.9
Referendum	Peter Stocken	1,304	2.7	N/A
Green	Peter West	1,249	2.6	+0.4
Ind. Conservative	Richard Huggett	1,098	2.2	N/A
UKIP	Frank Stevens	179	0.4	N/A
Independent	Bob Dobbs	125	0.3	N/A
Rainbow Dream Ticket	Alan Card	59	0.1	N/A
Majority		13,181	26.9	N/A
Turnout		48,951	73.4	−2.3
Registered electors		66,720		
Labour Co-op gain from Conservative		Swing	+16.0	

1992 notional result
Party	Vote	%
Conservative	22,619	45.3
Labour	20,089	40.2
Liberal Democrats	6,169	12.3
Others	1,098	2.2
Turnout	49,975	75.7
Electorate	66,008	

General election 1992: Brighton Pavilion
Party	Candidate	Votes	%	±%
Conservative	Derek Spencer	20,630	46.6	−4.2
Labour Co-op	David Lepper	16,955	38.3	+8.6
Liberal Democrats	Tom Pearce	5,606	12.7	−6.8
Green	Iain Brodie	963	2.2	N/A
Natural Law	Eileen Turner	103	0.2	N/A
Majority		3,675	8.3	−12.8
Turnout		44,257	76.8	+3.1
Registered electors		57,616		
Conservative hold		Swing	−6.4	

=== Elections in the 1980s ===
General election 1987: Brighton Pavilion
Party	Candidate	Votes	%	±%
Conservative	Julian Amery	22,056	50.8	−0.7
Labour	Dave Hill	12,914	29.7	+5.9
SDP	Kevin Carey	8,459	19.5	−5.1
Majority		9,142	21.1	−5.8
Turnout		43,416	73.7	+4.4
Registered electors		58,910		
Conservative hold		Swing	−3.3	

General election 1983: Brighton Pavilion
Party	Candidate	Votes	%	±%
Conservative	Julian Amery	21,323	51.5	−1.9
SDP	Michael Neves	10,191	24.6	+10.2
Labour	Harold Spillman	9,879	23.9	−5.8
Majority		11,132	26.9	+3.1
Turnout		41,393	69.3	−3.3
Registered electors		59,769		
Conservative hold		Swing	−6.1	

=== Elections in the 1970s ===
1979 notional result
Party	Vote	%
Conservative	23,239	53.5
Labour	12,893	29.7
Liberal	6,253	14.4
Others	1,092	2.5
Turnout	43,477	
Electorate		

General election 1979: Brighton Pavilion
Party	Candidate	Votes	%	±%
Conservative	Julian Amery	22,218	53.7	+5.3
Labour	Dave Hill	12,099	29.3	−0.3
Liberal	D. Venables	5,965	14.4	−7.6
Ecology	J Beale	638	1.5	N/A
National Front	H Jones	436	1.1	N/A
Majority		10,119	24.5	+5.6
Turnout		41,355	72.6	+4.0
Registered electors		57,003		
Conservative hold		Swing	+2.8	

General election October 1974: Brighton Pavilion
Party	Candidate	Votes	%	±%
Conservative	Julian Amery	19,041	48.4	−2.1
Labour	G W Humphrey	11,624	29.6	+3.5
Liberal	D Venables	8,648	22.0	−0.5
Majority		7,417	18.9	−5.6
Turnout		39,313	68.5	−7.6
Registered electors		57,351		
Conservative hold		Swing	−2.8	

General election February 1974: Brighton Pavilion
Party	Candidate	Votes	%	±%
Conservative	Julian Amery	21,910	50.5	−11.4
Labour	Francis Tonks	11,292	26.0	−9.0
Liberal	K Hooper	9,764	22.5	N/A
Independent	Harvey Holford	428	1.0	N/A
Majority		10,618	24.5	−2.5
Turnout		43,394	76.2	+9.4
Registered electors		56,982		
Conservative hold		Swing	−1.2	

General election 1970: Brighton Pavilion
Party	Candidate	Votes	%	±%
Conservative	Julian Amery	24,365	61.9	+3.8
Labour	Francis Tonks	13,771	35.0	−6.9
Independent	George Thomas	1,205	3.1	N/A
Majority		10,594	26.9	+10.6
Turnout		39,341	66.5	−3.8
Registered electors		59,150		
Conservative hold		Swing	+5.3	

=== Elections in the 1960s ===
1969 Brighton Pavilion by-election
Party	Candidate	Votes	%	±%
Conservative	Julian Amery	17,636	70.5	+12.5
Labour	Thomas Skeffington-Lodge	4,654	18.6	−23.2
Liberal	Nesta Ellis	2,711	10.8	N/A
Majority		12,982	51.9	+35.6
Turnout		25,001		
Conservative hold		Swing	+17.8	

General election 1966: Brighton Pavilion
Party	Candidate	Votes	%	±%
Conservative	William Teeling	22,687	58.1	+5.0
Labour	Alistair Graham	16,333	41.9	+13.6
Majority		6,354	16.3	−8.6
Turnout		39,020	70.3	+0.3
Registered electors		55,532		
Conservative hold		Swing	−4.3	

General election 1964: Brighton Pavilion
Party	Candidate	Votes	%	±%
Conservative	William Teeling	20,998	53.1	−16.8
Labour	Peter Nurse	11,148	28.2	−1.8
Liberal	David Randall Sinnatt	7,362	18.6	N/A
Majority		9,850	24.9	−15.0
Turnout		39,508	70.1	+0.2
Registered electors		56,391		
Conservative hold		Swing	−7.5	

=== Elections in the 1950s ===
General election 1959: Brighton Pavilion
Party	Candidate	Votes	%	±%
Conservative	William Teeling	27,972	70.0	+1.9
Labour	Reginald G White	11,998	30.0	−1.9
Majority		15,974	40.0	+3.9
Turnout		39,970	69.8	+2.3
Registered electors		57,238		
Conservative hold		Swing	+1.9	

General election 1955: Brighton Pavilion
Party	Candidate	Votes	%	±%
Conservative	William Teeling	27,128	68.0	−0.5
Labour	Leonard Knowles	12,742	32.0	+0.5
Majority		14,386	36.0	−0.9
Turnout		39,870	67.5	−8.0
Registered electors		59,053		
Conservative hold		Swing	−0.5	

General election 1951: Brighton Pavilion
Party	Candidate	Votes	%	±%
Conservative	William Teeling	29,167	68.5	+7.0
Labour	Elisabeth Littlejohn	13,410	31.5	+3.5
Majority		15,757	37.0	+3.5
Turnout		42,577	75.5	−3.4
Registered electors		56,361		
Conservative hold		Swing	+1.8	

General election 1950: Brighton Pavilion
Party	Candidate	Votes	%	±%
Conservative	William Teeling	26,917	61.5	
Labour	Leonard Knowles	12,264	28.0	
Liberal	John Choate	4,555	10.4	
Majority		14,653	33.5	
Turnout		43,736	78.9	
Registered electors		55,401		
Conservative win (new seat)				

== See also ==
- parliamentary constituencies in East Sussex
- List of parliamentary constituencies in the South East England (region)

== Sources ==
- Election result, 2005 (BBC)
- Election results, 1997 – 2001 (BBC)
- Election results, 1997 – 2001 (Election Demon)
- Election results, 1983 – 1992 (Election Demon)
- Election results, 1992 – 2005 (Guardian)
- Election results, 1951 – 2001 (Keele University)
- By-election result, 1969 (Geocities)
- F. W. S. Craig. British Parliamentary Election Results 1950–1973. (ISBN 0-900178-07-8)
