= Julian Amery =

British politician (1919–1996)

The Right Honourable The Lord Amery of Lustleigh PC
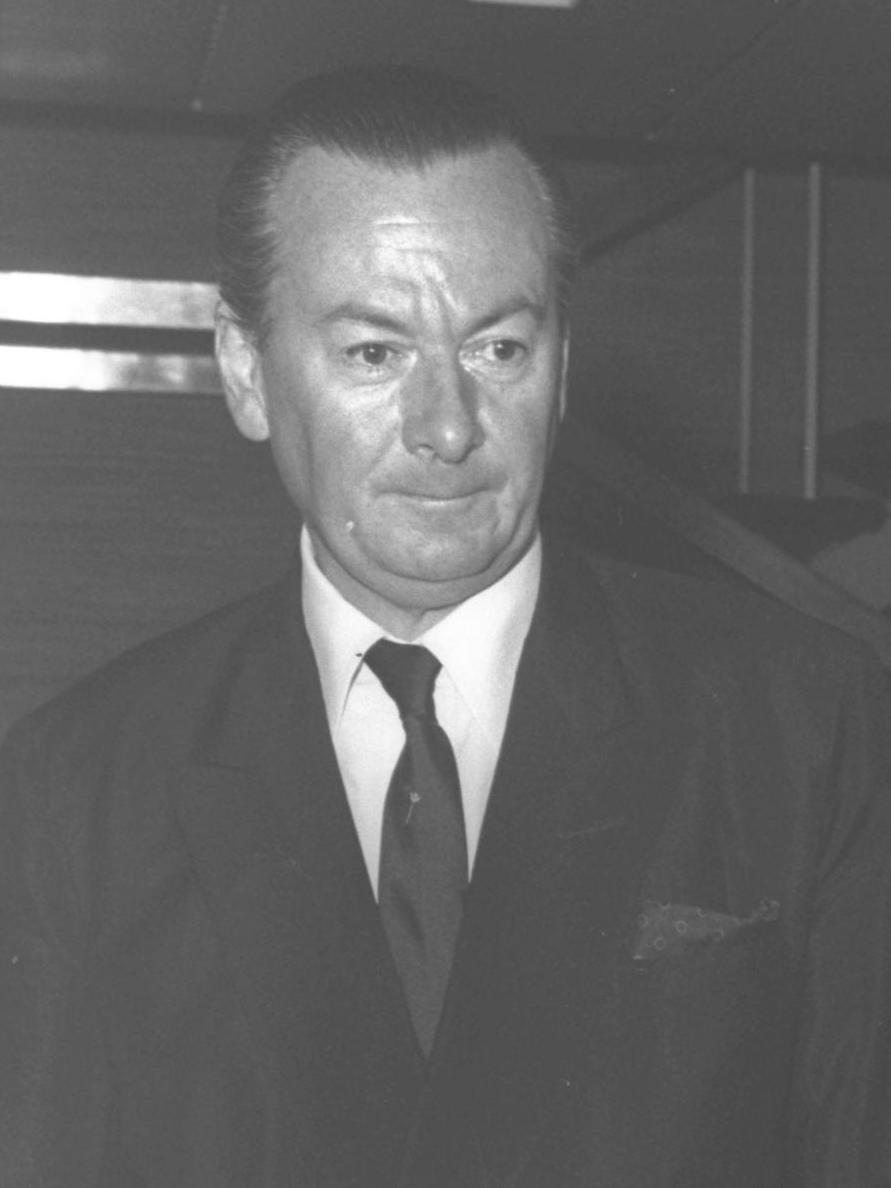
- Julian Amery, 1965

Minister of State for Foreign and Commonwealth Affairs
- In office 5 November 1972 – 4 March 1974
- Prime Minister: Edward Heath
- Sec. of State: Sir Alec Douglas-Home
- Preceded by: Joseph Godber
- Succeeded by: David Ennals; Roy Hattersley

Minister for Housing and Construction
- In office 15 October 1970 – 5 November 1972
- Prime Minister: Edward Heath
- Preceded by: Office established
- Succeeded by: Paul Channon

Minister of Public Buildings and Works
- In office 23 June 1970 – 14 October 1970
- Preceded by: John Silkin
- Succeeded by: Office abolished

Member of Parliament for Preston North
- In office 23 February 1950 – 10 March 1966
- Preceded by: Constituency created
- Succeeded by: Ronald Atkins

Member of Parliament for Brighton Pavilion
- In office 27 March 1969 – 16 March 1992
- Preceded by: Sir William Teeling
- Succeeded by: Derek Spencer

Personal details
- Born: Harold Julian Amery; 27 March 1919 London, England
- Died: 3 September 1996 (aged 77) London, England
- Party: Conservative
- Spouse: Catherine Macmillan (m. 1950; died 1991)
- Children: 4
- Education: Balliol College, Oxford

Military service
- Allegiance: United Kingdom
- Branch/service: British Army
- Rank: Captain
- Battles/wars: Second World War

Harold Julian Amery, Baron Amery of Lustleigh, PC (27 March 1919 – 3 September 1996) was a British Conservative Party politician, who served as a Member of Parliament (MP) for 39 of the 42 years between 1950 and 1992. He was appointed to the Privy Council in 1960.

Amery was created a life peer upon his retirement from the House of Commons in 1992. For three decades, he was a leading figure in the Conservative Monday Club. He was the son-in-law of Conservative prime minister Harold Macmillan. In 1945, his brother John was hanged for high treason during the Second World War.

== Early and family life ==
Amery was born in Chelsea, London, on 27 March 1919. His father was Leo Amery, a British statesman and Conservative politician. He was educated at Eaton House, Summer Fields School, Eton College and Balliol College, Oxford. While an undergraduate, he had a brief romance with the future novelist Barbara Pym, who was six years his senior.

== Military service ==
Before the Second World War started, Amery was a war correspondent in the Spanish Civil War and later an attaché for the British Foreign Office in Belgrade. After the war began he joined the RAF as a sergeant in 1940, then was commissioned and transferred to the British Army on the General List in 1941, reaching the rank of captain.

He spent 1941–42 in the eastern Mediterranean (the Middle East, Malta, Yugoslavia) and served as liaison officer to the Albanian Resistance Movement in 1943–44 ("The Musketeers": Captain Julian Amery, Major David Smiley and Lieutenant-Colonel Neil McLean). The following year, Amery went to China to work with General Carton de Wiart, then Prime Minister's personal representative to Generalissimo Chiang Kai-shek. Amery became a close friend of King Zog of Albania and described him as "the cleverest man I have ever met".

== Political career ==
Amery won a parliamentary seat in the first general election held after he returned to civilian life, in 1950. He was elected as Conservative MP for Preston North, going on to hold a number of government offices, all in governments led by his father-in-law, now the Prime Minister. He began with two Under-Secretaryships of State: for War (1957–58) and for the Colonies (1958–60). He was promoted to Secretary of State for Air (1960–62), followed by a promotion to the post of Minister of Aviation (1962–64). In this role and during this two-year period, Amery was involved in the planning stages of what would become the supersonic passenger service known as Concorde.

Amery lost his Preston North seat in 1966, but was re-elected to the Commons in 1969 representing Brighton Pavilion, a seat he would hold until 1992 when he retired. On 8 July 1992, he was created a life peer as Baron Amery of Lustleigh, of Preston in the County of Lancashire and of Brighton in the County of East Sussex.

Under the Heath administration, Amery held three ministerial posts: Minister for Public Building and Works (1970), Minister for Housing and Construction (1970–72) and Minister of State, Foreign and Commonwealth Affairs (1972–74).

=== Monday Club ===
For 30 years, Amery was an active member and later a patron of the Conservative Monday Club, where he became friendly with General Sir Walter Walker, subsequently writing the foreword for Walker's anti-Soviet book, The Next Domino.

He was guest of honour at the club's annual dinner at the Cutlers' Hall in 1963. In 1965, he wrote the foreword for club activist Geoffrey Stewart-Smith's book, No Vision Here. On May Day 1970, he was one of the club's principal speakers at its Law and Liberty rally in Trafalgar Square, held in answer to the Stop the Seventy Tour campaign, designed to stop the South African cricket tour.

Amery was the Monday Club's guest of honour at its annual dinner held at the Savoy Hotel, London, in January 1974 and again at the dinner at the end of the club's two-day conference in Birmingham in March 1975.

=== Political views ===
Amery was in favour of entry to the European Common Market and also of the nuclear deterrent. Both caused some discord between himself and his old friend Enoch Powell but for many, he was seen as an archetypal Conservative from the "God and Empire" school. In 1948, Amery opposed GATT, arguing that it limited imperial preference.

In late 1962 Amery made these comments after Egypt sent troops to Yemen to prevent an insurrection:

"The prosperity of our people rests really on the oil in the Persian Gulf, the rubber and tin of Malaya, and the gold, copper and precious metals of South- and Central Africa. As long as we have access to these; as long as we can realize the investments we have there; as long as we trade with this part of the world, we shall be prosperous. If the communists [or anyone else] were to take them over, we would lose the lot. Governments like Colonel Nasser's in Egypt are just as dangerous."

In 1963, Amery took charge of Quintin Hogg's campaign for leadership of the Conservative Party.

In early 1975, he took part in a House of Commons debate on the Trades Unions Congress's invitation to Alexander Shelepin, the former Soviet KGB chief, to visit Britain. He stated that "more and more people are beginning to look upon the TUC as a Communist-penetrated show and this invitation must strengthen that view."

According to Margaret Thatcher's 1995 memoir, The Path to Power, when Harold Wilson's Labour government proposed devolution for Scotland in 1976, "Julian Amery and Maurice Macmillan proved effective leaders of the anti-devolution Tory camp."

Although he was Harold Macmillan's son-in-law, he did not defend him when Count Nikolai Tolstoy published The Minister and the Massacres in 1986, focusing the ultimate burden of blame sharply on Macmillan for the 1945 Bleiburg repatriations and the Cossack repatriations. Amery stated that the repatriations were "one of the few blots on Harold that I can think of".

== Personal life ==
On 26 January 1950, he married Catherine Macmillan (19 November 1926 – 27 May 1991), daughter of Harold Macmillan. The couple had one son and three daughters.

Amery died from heart failure on 3 September 1996, aged 77, at his home in Eaton Square, Westminster, London. He is buried with his wife (who predeceased him) at the Church of St John the Baptist in Lustleigh, Devon, along with his father Leo Amery.

== Notes ==
Citations

Bibliography

- Amery, Julian, PC, MP et al., Rhodesia and the Threat to the West, London, Monday Club, 1976.
- Amery, Julian, PC, MP, The Next Four Years, in the Primrose League Gazette, vol. 87, no. 4, October 1983, London.
- Amery, Julian, MP, The Rt. Hon., Facing up to Soviet Imperialism, in the Monday Club's October 1985 Conservative Party Conference issue of their newspaper, Right Ahead.
- Amery, Julian, ALBANIA IN WW II by Julian Amery, from Oxford Companion to the Second World War (1995), pp. 24–26
- Byrne, Paula, The Adventures of Miss Barbara Pym, London, William Collins, 2021, ISBN 978-0-00-832224-3
- Clark, Alan, The Tories – Conservatives and The Nation State, London, 1998, p 324–5, ISBN 0-297-81849-X
- Copping, Robert, The Story of The Monday Club – The First Decade, April 1972; and The Monday Club – Crisis and After (Foreword by John Biggs‑Davison, MP), May 1975, pp. 12, 24, published by the Current Affairs Information Service.
- Dod's Parliamentary Companion 1991, London, Vacher Dod Publishing Ltd, p. 394, ISBN 0-905702-17-4
- Dorril, Stephen, MI6: Inside the Covert World of Her Majesty's Secret Intelligence Service, New York, The Free Press, 2000 (ISBN 0-7432-0379-8)
- Faber, David, Speaking for England: Leo, Julian and John Amery - The Tragedy of a Political Family, London, Free Press, 2005, ISBN 0-7432-5688-3
- Gash, Norman, with Donald Southgate, David Dilks, and John Ramsden; introduction by Lord Butler, KG, PC, The Conservatives – A History of their Origins to 1965, London, 1977, pp. 268–9. ISBN 0-04-942157-3
- Heffer, Simon, Like the Roman: The Life of Enoch Powell, London, Weidenfeld & Nicolson, 1998, ISBN 0-297-84286-2
- Horne, Alistair, Macmillan, 1894–1956, (volume 1 of the official biography), London, Macmillan, 1988, ISBN 0-333-27691-4, pp. 81, 253, 275, 326, 388, 441.
- The London Gazette, https://www.thegazette.co.uk
- Messina, Anthony M, Race and Party Competition in Britain, Oxford, Clarendon Press, 1989, p. 138, ISBN 0-19-827534-X
- Smiley, Colonel David Arabian Assignment London, Cooper, 1975. MI6 – Oman and Yemen.
- Smiley, Colonel David Albanian Assignment, London, Chatto & Windus, 1984. Foreword by Sir Patrick Leigh Fermor. SOE in Albania (1943–44).
- Smiley, Colonel David Irregular Regular, Norwich, Michael Russell, 1994 (ISBN 0 85955 202 0). Translated into French as Au cœur de l'action clandestine, des commandos au MI6, L'Esprit du Livre Editions, 2008. The Memoirs of an SOE officer (Albania, Asia) and MI6 agent (Poland, Malta, Oman, Yemen), brother‑in‑arms of Julian Amery.
- Weale, Adrian, Patriot Traitors – Roger Casement, John Amery and the Real Meaning of Treason, London, Viking, 2001, ISBN 0-670-88498-7

== Primary sources ==
- Amery, Julian, The Life of Joseph Chamberlain, Vol, Four, 1901–1903, At the Height of His Power, London: MacMillan, 1951.
- Amery, Julian, The Life of Joseph Chamberlain, Vol. Five, 1901–1903, And the Tariff Reform Campaign, London: MacMillan, 1969.
- Amery, Julian, The Life of Joseph Chamberlain, Vol. Six, 1903–1968, And the Tariff Reform Campaign, London: MacMillan, 1969.

Parliament of the United Kingdom
New constituency	Member of Parliament for Preston North; 1950 – 1966	Succeeded by Ronald Atkins
Preceded by Sir William Teeling	Member of Parliament for Brighton Pavilion; 1969 – 1992	Succeeded by Sir Derek Spencer
Political offices
Preceded by John Profumo	Under-Secretary of State for the Colonies; 1958–1960	Succeeded by Hugh Fraser
Preceded by George Ward	Secretary of State for Air; 1960–1962	Succeeded by Hugh Fraser
Preceded by Peter Thorneycroft	Minister of Aviation; 1962–1964	Succeeded by Roy Jenkins
