= Parliamentary constituencies in Nottinghamshire =

The location of Nottinghamshire relative to England.

The ceremonial county of Nottinghamshire (which includes the unitary authority of Nottingham) is divided into 11 parliamentary constituencies: three borough constituencies and eight county constituencies.

== Constituencies ==
‡ Labour ¤ Reform UK

Constituency (Note: BC denotes borough constituency, CC denotes county constituency.)	Electorate	Majority (Note: The majority is the number of votes the winning candidate receives more than their nearest rival.)	Member of Parliament	Nearest opposition	Map
Ashfield CC	68,095	5,509	Lee Anderson¤	Rhea Keehn‡	
Bassetlaw CC	78,161	5,768	Jo White‡	Brendan Clarke-Smith†	
Broxtowe CC	70,440	8,403	Juliet Campbell‡	Darren Henry†	
Gedling CC	75,795	11,881	Michael Payne‡	Tom Randall†	
Mansfield CC	74,535	3,485	Steve Yemm‡	Ben Bradley†	
Newark CC	79,783	3,572	Robert Jenrick¤ (Note: Jenrick defected from the Conservative Party in January 2026, after losing the whip the same day.)	Saj Ahmad‡	
Nottingham East BC	69,395	15,162	Nadia Whittome‡	Rosey Palmer (Green)	
Nottingham North and Kimberley BC	73,768	9,427	Alex Norris‡	Golam Kadiri¤	
Nottingham South BC	64,255	10,294	Lilian Greenwood‡	Zarmeena Quraishi†	
Rushcliffe CC	79,160	7,426	James Naish‡	Ruth Edwards†	
Sherwood Forest CC	76,543	5,443	Michelle Welsh‡	Mark Spencer†	

== Boundary changes ==
=== 2024 ===
See 2023 Periodic Review of Westminster constituencies for further details.

Former name	Boundaries 2010–2024	Current name	Boundaries 2024–present
1. Ashfield CC; 2. Bassetlaw CC; 3. Broxtowe CC; 4. Gedling CC; 5. Mansfield CC; 6. Newark CC; 7. Nottingham East BC; 8. Nottingham North BC; 9. Nottingham South BC; 10. Rushcliffe CC; 11. Sherwood CC	Proposed Revision	1. Ashfield CC; 2. Bassetlaw CC; 3. Broxtowe CC; 4. Gedling CC; 5. Mansfield CC; 6. Newark CC; 7. Nottingham East BC; 8. Nottingham North and Kimberley BC; 9. Nottingham South BC; 10. Rushcliffe CC; 11. Sherwood Forest CC	Boundaries 2024–present

For the 2023 review of Westminster constituencies, which redrew the constituency map ahead of the 2024 United Kingdom general election, the Boundary Commission for England opted to retain the eleven constituencies in Nottinghamshire, as detailed below, with minor boundary changes to reflect changes to electoral wards within the county and to bring the electorates within the statutory range. As Nottingham North now contains wards in the Borough of Broxtowe, it was renamed Nottingham North and Kimberley. Sherwood was renamed Sherwood Forest. These changes came into effect for the 2024 general election.

The following constituencies were proposed:

Containing electoral wards in Ashfield

- Ashfield (part)
- Sherwood Forest (part)

Containing electoral wards in Bassetlaw

- Newark (part)
- Bassetlaw

Containing electoral wards in Broxtowe

- Broxtowe
- Nottingham North and Kimberley (part)

Containing electoral wards in Gedling

- Gedling
- Sherwood Forest (part)

Containing electoral wards in Mansfield

- Ashfield (part)
- Mansfield

Containing electoral wards in Newark and Sherwood

- Newark (part)
- Sherwood Forest (part)

Containing electoral wards in Nottingham

- Nottingham East
- Nottingham North and Kimberley (part)
- Nottingham South

Containing electoral wards in Rushcliffe

- Newark (part)
- Rushcliffe

=== 2010 ===
In the Fifth Review the Boundary Commission for England recommended that Nottinghamshire retained its current constituencies, with changes only to reflect revisions to local authority ward boundaries and to reduce the electoral disparity between constituencies..

Name	Boundaries 1997-2010	Boundaries 2010–2024
1. Ashfield CC; 2. Bassetlaw CC; 3. Broxtowe CC; 4. Gedling CC; 5. Mansfield CC; 6. Newark CC; 7. Nottingham East BC; 8. Nottingham North BC; 9. Nottingham South BC; 10. Rushcliffe CC; 11. Sherwood CC	Parliamentary constituencies in Nottinghamshire	Proposed Revision

== Results history ==
Primary data source: House of Commons research briefing - General election results from 1918 to 2019

=== 2024 ===
The number of votes cast for each political party who fielded candidates in constituencies comprising Nottinghamshire in the 2019 general election were as follows:

Party	Votes	%	Change from 2019	Seats	Change from 2019
Labour	201,997	41.5%	▲4.1%	9	▲6
Conservative	119,325	24.5%	▼22.9%	1	▼7
Reform	94,331	19.4%	▲16.5%	1	▲1
Green	30,517	6.3%	▲4.4	0	Steady
Liberal Democrat	22,827	4.7%	▼1.5%	0	Steady
Workers	4,459	0.9%	New	0	Steady
Others	13,060	2.7%	▼1.5	0	Steady
Total	486,516	100.0		11	

=== Percentage votes ===
Election year	1974 (Feb)	1974 (Oct)	1979	1983	1987	1992	1997	2001	2005	2010	2015	2017	2019	2024
Labour	46.9	47.3	42.8	32.2	34.7	44.4	54.3	50.9	44.5	37.0	39.7	48.0	37.4	41.5
Conservative	39.6	35.6	45.0	45.1	46.0	42.7	30.5	34.0	33.1	35.9	36.7	43.9	47.4	24.5
Reform^{1}	-	-	-	-	-	-	-	-	-	-	-	-	2.9	19.4
Green Party	-	-	-	-	*	*	*	*	*	0.6	3.7	1.0	1.9	6.3
Liberal Democrat^{2}	13.0	16.3	11.5	21.9	18.6	12.1	10.9	13.1	16.2	19.2	4.7	2.9	6.2	4.7
UKIP	-	-	-	-	-	-	*	*	*	3.4	14.9	2.9	*	-
Other	0.5	0.8	0.8	0.7	0.6	0.7	4.3	2.0	6.3	3.8	0.4	1.2	4.3	3.6

^{1}As the Brexit Party in 2019

^{2}1974 & 1979 - Liberal Party; 1983 & 1987 - SDP–Liberal Alliance

* Included in Other

=== Seats ===
Election year	1974 (Feb)	1974 (Oct)	1979	1983	1987	1992	1997	2001	2005	2010	2015	2017	2019	2024
Labour	7	7	6	3	4	7	10	9	9	7	7	6	3	9
Conservative	3	3	4	8	7	4	1	2	2	4	4	5	8	1
Reform UK	0	0	0	0	0	0	0	0	0	0	0	0	0	1
Total	10	10	10	11	11	11	11	11	11	11	11	11	11	11

=== Maps ===
==== 1885-1910 ====
1885

1886

1892

1895

1900

1906

Jan 1910

Dec 1910

==== 1918-1945 ====
1918

1922

1923

1924

1929

1931

1935

1945

==== 1950-1979 ====
1950

1951

1955

1959

1964

1966

1970

1974 Feb

1974 Oct

1979

==== 1983-present ====
1983

1987

1992

1997

2001

2005

2010

2015

2017

2019

2024

== Historical representation by party ==
A cell marked → (with a different colour background to the preceding cell) indicates that the previous MP continued to sit under a new party name.

=== 1885 to 1918 ===
Conservative Liberal Liberal-Labour Liberal Unionist

Constituency	1885	1886	90	1892	1895	98	00	1900	1906	Jan 1910	Dec 1910	12	16
Bassetlaw	Beckett-Denison		Milner						Newnes	Hume-Williams			
Mansfield	Foljambe			Williams				Markham					C. H. Seely
Newark	Pierrepont				Finch-Hatton	Pierrepont	Welby		Starkey				
Nottingham East	Morley				Bond				Cotton	Morrison		Rees	
Nottingham South	Williams	Wright			Cavendish-Bentinck				Richardson	Cavendish-Bentinck			
Nottingham West	C. Seely	Broadhurst		C. Seely	Yoxall								
Rushcliffe	Ellis										Jones		

=== 1918 to 1950 ===
Conservative Labour Liberal National Labour

Constituency	1918	22	1922	1923	1924	27	1929	30	31	1931	34	1935	40	41	43	1945
Bassetlaw	Hume-Williams						MacDonald		→			Bellenger				
Broxtowe	Spencer					→	Cocks									
Mansfield	Carter		Bennett	Varley			Brown							Taylor		
Newark	Starkey		W. Cavendish-Bentinck												Shephard	
Nottingham Central	Atkey		Berkeley		Bennett			O'Connor					Sykes			de Freitas
Nottingham East	Rees	Houfton		Birkett	Brocklebank		Birkett			Gluckstein						Harrison
Nottingham South	H. Cavendish-Bentinck						Knight		→			Markham				Smith
Nottingham West	Hayday									Caporn		Hayday				O'Brien
Rushcliffe	Betterton										Assheton					Paton

=== 1950 to 1983 ===
Conservative Labour

Constituency	1950	1951	53	1955	1959	1964	1966	68	1970	Feb 1974	Oct 1974	77	1979
Nottingham South	Smith			Keegan	Clark		Perry		Fowler				
Bassetlaw	Bellenger							Ashton					
Broxtowe / Ashfield (1955)	Cocks		Warbey				Marquand					Smith	Haynes
Carlton	Pickthorn						Holland						
Mansfield	Taylor						Concannon						
Newark	Deer					Bishop							Alexander
Nottingham Central / N'ham E (1974)	Winterbottom			Cordeaux		Dunnett							
Nottingham E / Nottingham N (1955)	Harrison				Whitlock								
Nottingham NW / Nottingham W (1955)	O'Brien				Tapsell	English							
Rushcliffe	Redmayne						Gardner		Clarke				
Beeston										Lester			

=== 1983 to present ===
Change UK Conservative Independent Labour Reform UK

Constituency	1983	1987	1992	1997	2001	2005	2010	13	14	2015	2017	19	2019	24	2024	26
Ashfield	Haynes		Hoon				De Piero						Anderson	→		
Bassetlaw	Ashton				Mann								Clarke-Smith		White	
Broxtowe	Lester			Palmer			Soubry					→	Henry		Campbell	
Gedling	Holland	Mitchell		Coaker									Randall		Payne	
Mansfield	Concannon	Meale									Bradley				Yemm	
Newark	Alexander			Jones	Mercer			→	Jenrick							→
Nottingham East	Knowles		Heppell				Leslie					→	Whittome			
Nottingham North / & Kimberley ('24)	Ottaway	Allen									Norris					
Nottingham South	Brandon-Bravo		Simpson				Greenwood									
Rushcliffe	Clarke											→	Edwards		Naish	
Sherwood / Sherwood Forest (2024)	Stewart		Tipping				Spencer								Welsh	

== See also ==
- Parliamentary constituencies in the East Midlands
