= Yoxall (disambiguation) =

Yoxall is a large village in Staffordshire, England.

Yoxall may also refer to:

- Harry Yoxall (1896–1984), British publisher
- James Yoxall (1857–1925), British Liberal Party politician and trade unionist
- Leslie Yoxall (1914–2005), British codebreaker at Bletchley Park during World War II
