= Quiviger =

Quiviger or Kivijer is a surname, and may refer to:

Quiviger derives from kivijer which means 'tanner' in Breton.

- Pascale Quiviger (born 1969), Canadian writer
- Pierre-Yves Quiviger, French philosopher
