= Nottingham South =

UK Parliament constituency (since 1983)

Coordinates: 52.92°N 1.17°W

- Borough constituency for the House of Commons
- Interactive map of boundaries from 2024
- Location within the East Midlands
- County: Nottinghamshire
- Electorate: 76,076 (March 2020)
- Major settlements: Nottingham, Clifton, Wollaton

Current constituency
- Created: 1983
- Member of Parliament: Lilian Greenwood (Labour)
- Seats: One
- Created from: Nottingham East and Nottingham West

1885–1974
- Seats: One
- Type of constituency: Borough constituency
- Created from: Nottingham
- Replaced by: Nottingham East, Nottingham West, Rushcliffe

Nottingham South is a constituency of the Parliament of the United Kingdom, represented since 2010 by Lilian Greenwood of the Labour Party. (Note: A county constituency (for the purposes of election expenses and type of returning officer)) (Note: As with all constituencies, the constituency elects one Member of Parliament (MP) by the first past the post system of election at least every five years)

== Constituency profile ==
Nottingham South is a constituency in Nottinghamshire in the East Midlands of England. It covers the southern and western neighbourhoods of the city of Nottingham, including Clifton, Wilford, the Meadows, Dunkirk, Lenton, Radford, Wollaton, Beechdale and Bilborough.

Nottingham is a historic city of medieval origin. During the industrial era, the manufacturing of bicycles and textiles, particularly lace, were significant industries in the city. Today, Nottingham is a major centre for sports and is recognised as a City of Literature by UNESCO. This constituency contains neighbourhoods of varying character. Radford, Lenton and Dunkirk are densely-populated, inner-city residential neighbourhoods with large student populations due to their location close to the University of Nottingham, which has around 36,000 students. The Meadows, Clifton, Bilborough and Beechdale were developed as planned council estates in the post-war period and have high levels of deprivation. Wollaton and Wilford are affluent and suburban, with both areas falling within the top 10% least-deprived areas in England. This constituency contains the Queen's Medical Centre, once the largest hospital in the UK, and the headquarters of health retailer Boots, both of which are significant local employers. Nottingham South has overall below-average levels of wealth and house prices are generally lower than the regional and UK averages.

Nottingham South has a low proportion of older adults and a very high percentage of young adults and students; people between the ages of 18 and 24 make up 28% of the population, more than three times the UK-wide rate. In general, residents have low levels of income and homeownership and the child poverty rate is high. They are well-educated and a high proportion work in the health, education and public sectors. The percentage of residents claiming unemployment benefits is above-average. White people made up 69% of the population at the 2021 census. Asians were the largest ethnic minority group at 14% and Black people were 8%.

Most of Nottingham South is represented by the Labour Party at the local city council, although some localists were elected in Clifton. An estimated 51% of voters in the constituency supported leaving the European Union in the 2016 referendum, similar to the UK-wide rate of 52%.

== History ==
Since as early as 1295, Nottingham was represented by one large constituency which elected two members of parliament to the House of Commons. Under the Redistribution of Seats Act 1885 three single-member subdivisions were created: Nottingham East, Nottingham West and Nottingham South.

Nine year absence of the seat

Nottingham South was abolished in the election of February 1974 but was re-formed with altered boundaries nine years later in 1983 from parts of Nottingham East and Nottingham West.

Modern demography

Nottingham South is the most diverse of the three constituencies in terms of economic demographics. It includes areas of higher incomes than average in the form of Wollaton and The Park Estate and areas of relative poverty, both suburban and inner city. The council estate built next to and within the bounds of the village/parish of Clifton was once the largest in Europe.

Results to date excluding under the Blair Ministry when it was quite firmly Labour have produced the most marginal majorities of Nottingham City's three constituencies. The Conservative Martin Brandon-Bravo held the seat from 1983 to 1992. Since 1992, Nottingham South has been held by Labour MPs; Alan Simpson until retiring from the House of Commons in 2010 and Lilian Greenwood from 2010.

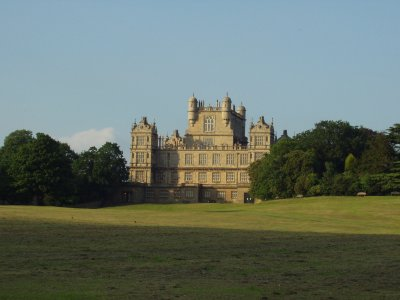
Wollaton Hall in Wollaton, one of the constituency's more affluent areas.

Communities or localities in Nottingham South include:

- Clifton
- Dunkirk
- Hockley Village
- Lace Market
- Leen Valley
- Lenton Abbey
- Lenton
- Parts of Nottingham City Centre
- Radford
- The Meadows
- The Park Estate
- Wollaton

== Boundaries ==
=== Historic ===
1885–1918: The Municipal Borough of Nottingham wards of Bridge, Castle, Market, Meadow, St Mary, and Trent.

1918–1955: The County Borough of Nottingham wards of Bridge, Castle, Meadows, and Trent.

1955–1974: The County Borough of Nottingham wards of Bridge, Clifton, Lenton, and Trent, and the Urban District of West Bridgford.

1983–2010: The City of Nottingham wards of Abbey, Bridge, Clifton East, Clifton West, Lenton, Park, Robin Hood, Wilford, and Wollaton.

2010–2024: The City of Nottingham wards of Bridge, Clifton North, Clifton South, Dunkirk and Lenton, Leen Valley, Radford and Park, Wollaton East and Lenton Abbey, and Wollaton West.

=== Current ===
Further to the 2023 review of Westminster constituencies, which came into effect for the 2024 general election, the composition of the constituency is as follows (as they existed on 1 December 2020):

- The City of Nottingham wards of Bilborough, Clifton East, Clifton West, Lenton & Wollaton East, Meadows, Radford, and Wollaton West.

Nottingham city centre was transferred to Nottingham East and Leen Valley to the newly created seat of Nottingham North and Kimberley, with the Bilborough ward being transferred from the abolished Nottingham North constituency.

Nottingham South contains at least parts of both of the city's universities. The University of Nottingham's University Park Campus and Jubilee Campus are both in the constituency, as is the Clifton Campus of Nottingham Trent University. Many of these students are based in rows of terraced housing in the Lenton and Radford wards of this seat. A minority of students and much of the universities' staff are based in neighbouring Beeston, but this falls within the Broxtowe constituency.

== Members of Parliament ==
Since 2010, the seat has been represented by Lilian Greenwood, who succeeded Labour's Alan Simpson on his retirement. Simpson had held the seat since 1992, when he unseated the Conservative Martin Brandon-Bravo.

=== MPs 1885–1974 ===
Nottingham prior to 1885

Election	Member	Party
1885	John Williams	Liberal
1886	Henry Smith Wright	Conservative
1895	Lord Henry Cavendish-Bentinck	Conservative
1906	Arthur Richardson	Liberal-Labour
January 1910	Lord Henry Cavendish-Bentinck	Conservative
1929	Holford Knight	Labour
1931	Holford Knight	National Labour
1935	Frank Markham	National Labour
1945	Norman Smith	Labour Co-operative
1955	Denis Keegan	Conservative
1959	William Clark	Conservative
1966	George Perry	Labour
1970	Norman Fowler	Conservative
February 1974	constituency abolished	

=== MPs since 1983 ===
Nottingham East and Nottingham West prior to 1983

Election	Member	Party
1983	Martin Brandon-Bravo	Conservative
1992	Alan Simpson	Labour
2010	Lilian Greenwood	Labour

== Elections ==
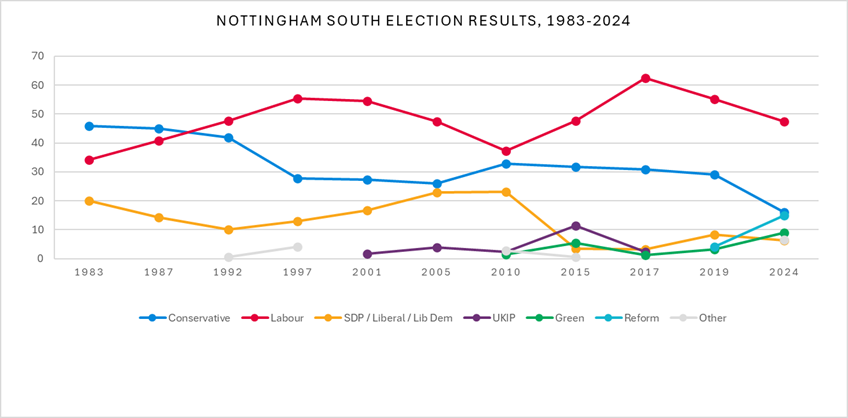
Nottingham South election results 1983-2024

=== Elections in the 2020s ===
General election 2024: Nottingham South
Party	Candidate	Votes	%	±%
Labour	Lilian Greenwood	15,579	47.4	−6.4
Conservative	Zarmeena Quraishi	5,285	16.1	−15.5
Reform	Mykel Hedge	4,936	15.0	+10.4
Green	Cath Sutherland	2,923	8.9	+5.6
Liberal Democrats	Christina Morgan-Danvers	2,059	6.3	−0.4
Workers Party	Paras Ghazni	1,496	4.6	N/A
Independent	Shaghofta Akhtar	449	1.4	N/A
Independent	Mohammed Sayeed	152	0.5	N/A
Majority		10,294	31.3	+5.2
Turnout		32,879	51.2	−9.4
Registered electors		64,255		
Labour hold		Swing	+4.5	

=== Elections in the 2010s ===
General election 2019: Nottingham South
Party	Candidate	Votes	%	±%
Labour	Lilian Greenwood	26,586	55.2	−7.2
Conservative	Marc Nykolyszyn	14,018	29.1	−1.8
Liberal Democrats	Barry Holliday	3,935	8.2	+5.0
Brexit Party	John Lawson	2,012	4.2	New
Green	Cath Sutherland	1,583	3.3	+2.1
Majority		12,568	26.1	−5.4
Turnout		48,134	60.6	−7.0
Labour hold		Swing	−2.7	

General election 2017: Nottingham South
Party	Candidate	Votes	%	±%
Labour	Lilian Greenwood	30,013	62.4	+14.8
Conservative	Jane Hunt	14,851	30.9	−0.8
Liberal Democrats	Tony Sutton	1,564	3.2	−0.3
UKIP	David Hollas	1,103	2.3	−9.0
Green	Adam McGregor	598	1.2	−4.2
Majority		15,162	31.5	+15.6
Turnout		48,129	67.6	+4.6
Labour hold		Swing	+7.7	

General election 2015: Nottingham South
Party	Candidate	Votes	%	±%
Labour	Lilian Greenwood	20,697	47.6	+10.3
Conservative	Jane Hunt	13,761	31.7	−1.2
UKIP	David Hollas	4,900	11.3	+8.9
Green	Adam McGregor	2,345	5.4	+3.9
Liberal Democrats	Deborah Newton-Cook	1,532	3.5	−19.6
TUSC	Andrew Clayworth	230	0.5	New
Majority		6,936	15.9	+11.5
Turnout		43,465	63.0	+2.5
Labour hold		Swing	+5.8	

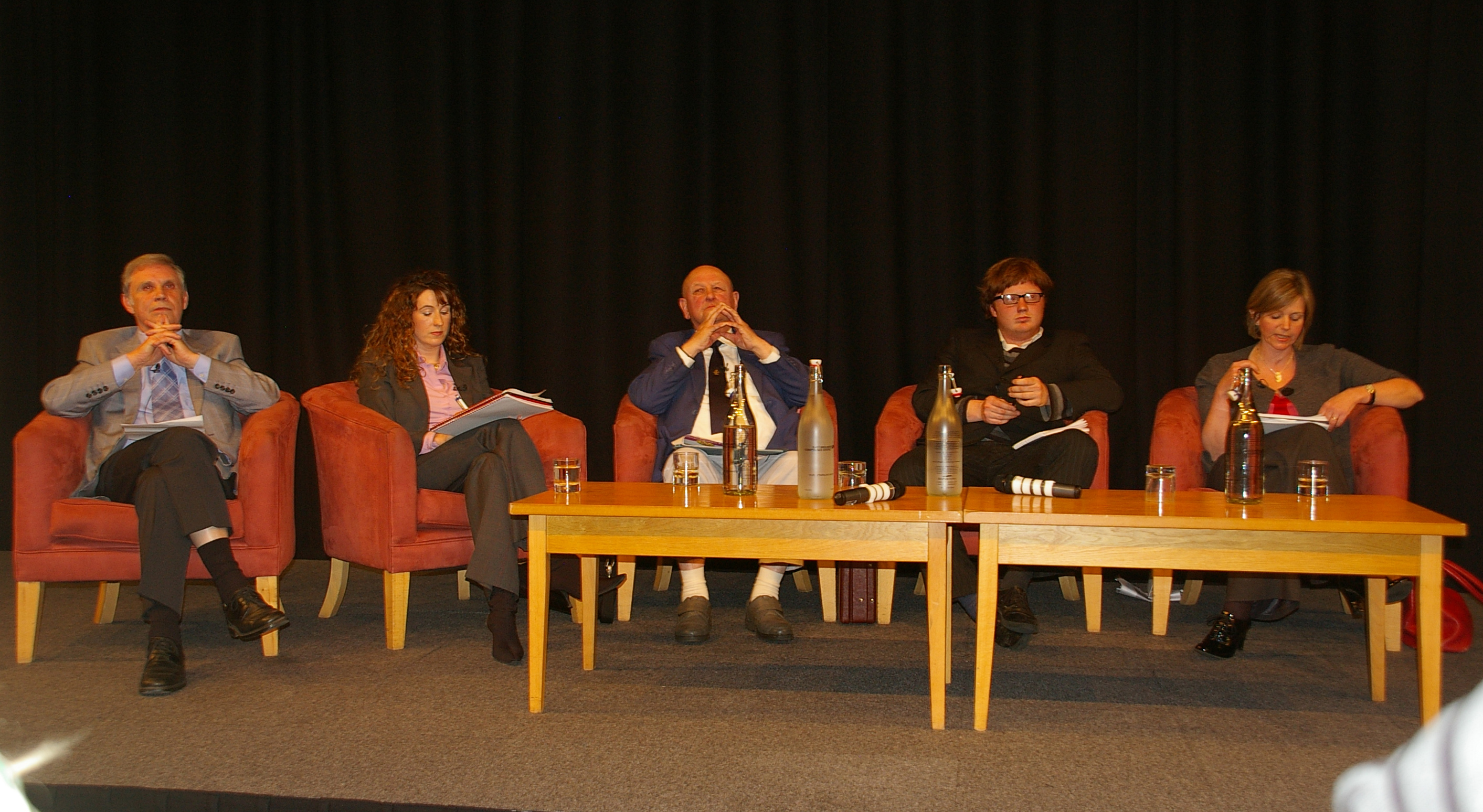
The prospective candidates for the 2010 election at the University of Nottingham Students' Union's Big Debate at the East Midlands Conference Centre. From left to right: Tony Sutton (Liberal Democrats), Rowena Holland (Conservative Party), Ken Browne (UK Independence Party), Matthew Butcher (Green Party), Lilian Greenwood (Labour Party)

General election 2010: Nottingham South
Party	Candidate	Votes	%	±%
Labour	Lilian Greenwood	15,209	37.3	−10.1
Conservative	Rowena Holland	13,437	32.9	+7.0
Liberal Democrats	Tony Sutton	9,406	23.1	+0.2
BNP	Tony Woodward	1,140	2.8	New
UKIP	Ken Browne	967	2.4	−1.5
Green	Matthew Butcher	630	1.5	New
Majority		1,772	4.4	−17.1
Turnout		40,789	60.5	+9.9
Labour hold		Swing	−7.2	

=== Elections in the 2000s ===
General election 2005: Nottingham South
Party	Candidate	Votes	%	±%
Labour	Alan Simpson	16,506	47.4	−7.1
Conservative	Sudesh Mattu	9,020	25.9	−1.3
Liberal Democrats	Tony Sutton	7,961	22.9	+6.3
UKIP	Ken Browne	1,353	3.9	+2.2
Majority		7,486	21.5	−5.8
Turnout		34,840	50.6	+0.5
Labour hold		Swing	−2.9	

General election 2001: Nottingham South
Party	Candidate	Votes	%	±%
Labour	Alan Simpson	19,949	54.5	−0.8
Conservative	Wendy Manning	9,960	27.2	−0.5
Liberal Democrats	Kevin Mulloy	6,064	16.6	+3.7
UKIP	David Bartrop	632	1.7	New
Majority		9,989	27.3	−0.3
Turnout		36,605	50.1	−16.9
Labour hold		Swing		

=== Elections in the 1990s ===
General election 1997: Nottingham South
Party	Candidate	Votes	%	±%
Labour	Alan Simpson	26,825	55.3	+7.6
Conservative	Brian Kirsch	13,461	27.7	−14.1
Liberal Democrats	Gary Long	6,265	12.9	+2.9
Referendum	Ken Thompson	1,523	3.1	New
National Democrats	Sharron Edwards	446	0.9	New
Majority		13,364	27.6	+21.7
Turnout		48,520	67.0	−7.2
Labour hold		Swing	+10.8	

General election 1992: Nottingham South
Party	Candidate	Votes	%	±%
Labour	Alan Simpson	25,771	47.7	+6.9
Conservative	Martin Brandon-Bravo	22,590	41.8	−3.2
Liberal Democrats	Gareth Long	5,408	10.0	−4.2
Natural Law	Julianne Christou	263	0.5	New
Majority		3,181	5.9	N/A
Turnout		54,032	74.2	+1.2
Labour gain from Conservative		Swing	+5.0	

=== Elections in the 1980s ===
General election 1987: Nottingham South
Party	Candidate	Votes	%	±%
Conservative	Martin Brandon-Bravo	23,921	45.0	−0.9
Labour	Alan Simpson	21,687	40.8	+6.7
SDP	Leighton Williams	7,517	14.2	−5.8
Majority		2,234	4.2	−7.6
Turnout		53,125	73.0	+2.8
Conservative hold		Swing		

General election 1983: Nottingham South
Party	Candidate	Votes	%	±%
Conservative	Martin Brandon-Bravo	22,238	45.9	
Labour	Ken Coates	16,523	34.1	
Liberal	Raymond Poynter	9,697	20.0	
Majority		5,715	11.8	
Turnout		48,458	70.2	
Conservative win (new seat)				

=== Elections in the 1970s ===
General election 1970: Nottingham South
Party	Candidate	Votes	%	±%
Conservative	Norman Fowler	26,726	53.75	
Labour	George Perry	23,031	46.25	
Majority		3,731	7.50	N/A
Turnout		49,793	70.03	
Conservative gain from Labour		Swing		

=== Elections in the 1960s ===
General election 1966: Nottingham South
Party	Candidate	Votes	%	±%
Labour	George Perry	24,580	50.32	
Conservative	William Clark	24,268	49.68	
Majority		316	0.64	N/A
Turnout		48,848	75.61	
Labour gain from Conservative		Swing		

General election 1964: Nottingham South
Party	Candidate	Votes	%	±%
Conservative	William Clark	23,594	45.97	
Labour	William Frederick Back	21,046	41.00	
Liberal	Brian S Stratford	6,690	13.03	New
Majority		2,548	4.97	
Turnout		51,329	78.17	
Conservative hold		Swing		

=== Elections in the 1950s ===
General election 1959: Nottingham South
Party	Candidate	Votes	%	±%
Conservative	William Clark	29,607	57.11	
Labour	John Silkin	22,235	42.89	
Majority		7,372	14.22	
Turnout		51,845	72.49	
Conservative hold		Swing		

General election 1955: Nottingham South
Party	Candidate	Votes	%	±%
Conservative	Denis Keegan	29,145	56.88	
Labour Co-op	Norman Smith	22,092	43.12	
Majority		7,053	13.76	N/A
Turnout		51,240	78.29	
Conservative gain from Labour Co-op		Swing		

General election 1951: Nottingham South
Party	Candidate	Votes	%	±%
Labour Co-op	Norman Smith	19,844	50.61	
Conservative	William Rees-Davies	19,362	49.39	
Majority		482	1.22	
Turnout		39,206	84.47	
Labour Co-op hold		Swing		

General election 1950: Nottingham South
Party	Candidate	Votes	%	±%
Labour Co-op	Norman Smith	18,806	48.03	
Conservative	William Rees-Davies	17,165	43.82	N/A
Liberal	Ernest Gwynne Watkins	3,182	8.13	
Majority		1,641	4.19	
Turnout		39,153	85.37	
Labour Co-op hold		Swing		

=== Elections in the 1940s ===
General election 1945: Nottingham South
Party	Candidate	Votes	%	±%
Labour Co-op	Norman Smith	15,316	50.46	
National	Frank Markham	10,766	35.47	N/A
Liberal	Ronald James Rae Blindell	4,272	14.07	
Majority		4,550	14.99	
Turnout		30,354	75.91	
Labour Co-op gain from National Labour		Swing		

=== Elections in the 1930s ===
General election 1935: Nottingham South
Party	Candidate	Votes	%	±%
National Labour	Frank Markham	15,559	52.24	
Labour	T. J. May	10,963	36.81	
Liberal	Joseph Mawdesley	3,260	10.95	New
Majority		4,596	15.43	
Turnout		29,782	70.95	
National Labour hold		Swing		

General election 1931: Nottingham South
Party	Candidate	Votes	%	±%
National Labour	Holford Knight	22,852	68.35	N/A
Labour	Alonzo Ralph Ellis	10,583	31.65	
Majority		12,269	36.70	
Turnout		33,435	77.57	
National Labour hold		Swing		

=== Elections in the 1920s ===
General election 1929: Nottingham South
Party	Candidate	Votes	%	±%
Labour	Holford Knight	14,800	42.9	+3.6
Unionist	Henry Cavendish-Bentinck	14,252	41.3	−19.4
Liberal	Leslie Hale	5,445	15.8	New
Majority		548	1.6	N/A
Turnout		34,497	80.4	+8.1
Registered electors		42,920		
Labour gain from Unionist		Swing	+11.5	

General election 1924: Nottingham South
Party	Candidate	Votes	%	±%
Unionist	Henry Cavendish-Bentinck	13,725	60.7	+9.3
Labour	Henry Mills	8,897	39.3	New
Majority		4,828	21.4	−5.2
Turnout		22,622	72.3	+4.7
Registered electors		31,271		
Unionist hold		Swing		

General election 1923: Nottingham South
Party	Candidate	Votes	%	±%
Unionist	Henry Cavendish-Bentinck	10,724	51.4	−24.9
Independent Labour	Henry Mills	5,176	24.8	+1.1
Liberal	Victor Deidorichs Duval	4,966	23.8	New
Majority		5,548	26.6	−26.0
Turnout		20,866	67.6	+1.3
Registered electors		30,847		
Unionist hold		Swing	−13.0	

General election 1922: Nottingham South
Party	Candidate	Votes	%	±%
Unionist	Henry Cavendish-Bentinck	15,158	76.3	+1.9
Independent Labour	Henry Mills	4,706	23.7	−1.9
Majority		10,452	52.6	+3.8
Turnout		19,864	66.3	+15.4
Registered electors		29,951		
Unionist hold		Swing	+1.9	

=== Elections in the 1910s ===
General election 1918: Nottingham South
Party		Candidate	Votes	%	±%
C	Unionist	Henry Cavendish-Bentinck	10,881	74.4	+22.8
	Independent Labour	Henry Mills	3,738	25.6	New
Majority			7,143	48.8	+45.6
Turnout			14,619	47.9	−47.0
Registered electors			30,528		
	Unionist hold		Swing		
C indicates candidate endorsed by the coalition government.

General election December 1910: Nottingham South
Party	Candidate	Votes	%	±%
Conservative	Henry Cavendish-Bentinck	6,151	51.6	+0.1
Lib-Lab	Arthur Richardson	5,766	48.4	−0.1
Majority		385	3.2	+2.0
Turnout		11,917	84.9	−4.1
Registered electors		14,031		
Conservative hold		Swing	+0.1	

General election January 1910: Nottingham South
Party	Candidate	Votes	%	±%
Conservative	Henry Cavendish-Bentinck	6,434	51.5	+4.9
Lib-Lab	Arthur Richardson	6,052	48.5	−4.9
Majority		382	3.0	N/A
Turnout		12,486	89.0	+2.4
Registered electors		14,031		
Conservative gain from Lib-Lab		Swing	+4.9	

=== Elections in the 1900s ===
General election 1906: Nottingham South
Party	Candidate	Votes	%	±%
Lib-Lab	Arthur Richardson	6,314	53.4	+10.9
Conservative	Henry Cavendish-Bentinck	5,514	46.6	−10.9
Majority		800	6.8	N/A
Turnout		11,828	86.6	+12.6
Registered electors		13,656		
Lib-Lab gain from Conservative		Swing	+10.9	

General election 1900: Nottingham South
Party	Candidate	Votes	%	±%
Conservative	Henry Cavendish-Bentinck	5,298	57.5	+5.1
Liberal	Henry Yorke Stanger	3,914	42.5	−5.1
Majority		1,384	15.0	+10.2
Turnout		9,212	74.0	−6.6
Registered electors		12,442		
Conservative hold		Swing	+5.1	

=== Elections in the 1890s ===
General election 1895: Nottingham South
Party	Candidate	Votes	%	±%
Conservative	Henry Cavendish-Bentinck	4,802	52.4	+1.9
Liberal	Frederick William Maude	4,369	47.6	−1.9
Majority		433	4.8	+3.8
Turnout		9,171	80.6	−1.7
Registered electors		11,377		
Conservative hold		Swing	+1.9	

General election 1892: Nottingham South
Party	Candidate	Votes	%	±%
Conservative	Henry Smith Wright	4,570	50.5	−1.0
Liberal	John Fletcher Moulton	4,487	49.5	+1.0
Majority		83	1.0	−2.0
Turnout		9,057	82.3	+12.5
Registered electors		11,010		
Conservative hold		Swing	−1.0	

=== Elections in the 1880s ===
General election 1886: Nottingham South
Party	Candidate	Votes	%	±%
Conservative	Henry Smith Wright	4,586	51.5	+3.4
Liberal	John Williams	4,317	48.5	−3.4
Majority		269	3.0	N/A
Turnout		8,903	69.8	−5.5
Registered electors		12,751		
Conservative gain from Liberal		Swing	+3.4	

General election 1885: Nottingham South
Party	Candidate	Votes	%	±%
Liberal	John Williams	4,983	51.9	
Conservative	Henry Smith Wright	4,620	48.1	
Majority		363	3.8	
Turnout		9,603	75.3	
Registered electors		12,751		
Liberal win (new seat)				

== See also ==
- List of parliamentary constituencies in Nottinghamshire
