= Harry Yoxall =

British publisher

Capt Harry Waldo Yoxall OBE MC JP (4 June 1896 – 5 May 1984) was a British publisher, chairman of Condé Nast and founder of British Vogue.

== Life ==
Harry Yoxall was the son of James Yoxall, Liberal MP for Nottingham West. He was educated at St Paul's School and Balliol College, Oxford. He saw active service in the First World War on the Western Front as a junior officer in the 18th Battalion King's Royal Rifle Corps (41st Division) from May 1916 up to the attack at Flers during the Somme offensive in September 1916; in various staff appointments in the Division and its component infantry brigades, mainly in the Ypres Salient, from October 1916 to July 1917; including preparations for the Battles of Messines Ridge and 3rd Ypres; as adjutant to the 18th KRRC during their heavy involvement in 3rd Ypres August – September 1917; and as an instructor in trench mortars with the British Military Mission to the United States November 1917 – April 1918. Yoxall joined Condé Nast Publications in 1921. Appointed managing director of Condé Nast in 1934, he was chairman from 1957 to 1964.

Yoxall started the English edition of Vogue. He was described as an "imaginative gourmet", and a "great Burgundy connoisseur".

== Works ==
- Modern Love, 1927
- All Abroad, 1928
- A Respectable Man, 1935
- Journey into Faith, 1963
- Forty Years in Management, 1964
- A Fashion of Life, New York: Taplinger Publishing, 1966.
- The Wines of Burgundy, 1968, rev. edn 1978
- Retirement a Pleasure, 1971
- The Enjoyment of Wine, 1972
