= Nottingham East =

UK Parliament constituency (1885–1955, 1974 onwards)

Coordinates: 52.96°N 1.13°W

- Borough constituency for the House of Commons
- Interactive map of boundaries from 2024
- Location within the East Midlands
- County: Nottinghamshire
- Electorate: 75,327 (March 2020)
- Major settlements: Nottingham

Current constituency
- Created: 1974
- Member of Parliament: Nadia Whittome (Labour)
- Seats: One
- Created from: Nottingham Central and Nottingham South

1885–1955
- Seats: One
- Type of constituency: Borough constituency
- Created from: Nottingham
- Replaced by: Nottingham Central and Nottingham North

Nottingham East is a constituency (Note: A borough constituency (for the purposes of election expenses and type of returning officer)) represented in the House of Commons of the UK Parliament since 2019 by Nadia Whittome of the Labour Party. (Note: As with all constituencies, the constituency elects one member of parliament (MP) by the first past the post system of election at least every five years.)

== Constituency profile ==
Nottingham East is a constituency in Nottinghamshire in the East Midlands of England. It covers the city centre of Nottingham and the neighbourhoods to its north and east, including Sneinton, Bakersfield, St Ann's, Sherwood, Hyson Green and part of Mapperley.

Nottingham is a historic city of medieval origin. During the industrial era, the manufacturing of bicycles and textiles, particularly lace, were significant industries in the city. Today, Nottingham is a major centre for sports and is recognised as a City of Literature by UNESCO. Many of this constituency's neighbourhoods were developed during the Victorian era and the early 20th century; Sneinton and Hyson Green feature dense terraced housing, St Ann's was developed as a planned council estate and the outer neighbourhoods are more suburban in character with detached and semi-detached properties. This constituency contains the main campus of Nottingham Trent University, which has around 35,000 students in total. Nottingham East has high levels of deprivation, particularly in Sneinton, St Ann's and Hyson Green which fall within the top 10% most-deprived areas in England. House prices across the constituency are generally lower than the rest of the East Midlands and considerably lower than the national average.

Nottingham East has a very low proportion of retirees and a very high young adult and student population; 23% of residents are between the ages of 18 and 24, nearly three times the UK-wide percentage. Residents have low rates of income and homeownership and the child poverty rate is nearly double the nationwide rate. Residents are generally well-educated and a high proportion work in the health and technology sectors. The percentage claiming unemployment benefits is almost double the overall UK proportion. White people made up 60% of the population at the 2021 census, around one-sixth of whom were of non-British origin, including large Italian and Polish communities. Asians, primarily Pakistanis, made up 19% of residents and were mostly concentrated in Hyson Green. Black people were 11% and were the largest ethnic minority group in St Ann's.

At the local city council, all seats in this constituency are represented by Labour Party councillors. Voters in Nottingham East strongly supported remaining in the European Union in the 2016 referendum; an estimated 60% voted to remain compared to the UK-wide figure of 48%.

== History ==
The present Nottingham East constituency was created in 1974, and first elected Jack Dunnett who had been Labour MP for the abolished Nottingham Central seat. Michael Knowles regained it for the Conservative Party in 1983, when some of the seat was transferred to the new Nottingham South constituency in boundary changes. Knowles held the seat with a reduced majority in 1987, but John Heppell gained it for Labour in 1992, and held the seat until he retired in 2010. Until 2019 it was held by Chris Leslie, initially for Labour Co-operative and later for Change UK. Leslie previously represented his hometown constituency of Shipley in West Yorkshire, from 1997 until losing his seat to Philip Davies in 2005. During his first term he joined the front benches serving as a junior minister as part of the Tony Blair Government and was briefly Shadow Chancellor after the 2015 general election. The incumbent MP, Nadia Whittome, was Baby of the House upon her election at the 2019 when she was 23 years old.

== Boundaries ==
=== Historic ===
1885–1918: The Borough of Nottingham wards of Byron, Manvers, Mapperley, Robin Hood, and St Ann's.

1918–1950: The County Borough of Nottingham wards of Byron, Manvers, Mapperley, and St Mary's.

1950–1955: The County Borough of Nottingham wards of Byron, Manvers, Mapperley, and St Ann's.

1974–1983: The County Borough of Nottingham wards of Bridge, Lenton, Manvers, Market, St Ann's, and Trent.

1983–2010: The City of Nottingham wards of Basford, Forest, Greenwood, Manvers, Mapperley, Radford, St Ann's, Sherwood, and Trent.

2010–2024: The City of Nottingham wards of Arboretum, Berridge, Dales, Mapperley, St Ann's, and Sherwood.

=== Current ===
Further to the 2023 review of Westminster constituencies, which came into effect for the 2024 general election, the composition of the constituency is as follows (as they existed on 1 December 2020):

- The City of Nottingham wards of Berridge, Castle, Dales, Hyson Green & Arboretum, Mapperley, St Ann's, and Sherwood.

The Castle ward, which incorporates Nottingham city centre was transferred from Nottingham South.

The constituency covers the north-eastern part of the City of Nottingham. It includes the suburbs of Mapperley, Carrington and Sherwood, and the inner city areas of Hyson Green, St Ann's, Bakersfield and Sneinton.

== Members of Parliament ==
=== MPs 1885–1955 ===
Nottingham prior to 1885

Event	Member	Party
1885	Arnold Morley	Liberal
1895	Edward Bond	Conservative
1906	Sir Henry Cotton	Liberal
1910	James Morrison	Conservative
1912 by-election	Sir John Rees	Conservative
1922 by-election	John Houfton	Coalition Conservative
1923	Norman Birkett	Liberal
1924	Edmund Brocklebank	Conservative
1929	Norman Birkett	Liberal
1931	Louis Gluckstein	Conservative
1945	James Harrison	Labour
1955	constituency abolished	

=== MPs since February 1974 ===
Nottingham Central and Nottingham South prior to 1974

Event	Member	Party
February 1974	Jack Dunnett	Labour
1983	Michael Knowles	Conservative
1992	John Heppell	Labour
2010	Chris Leslie	Labour Co-op
February 2019	Chris Leslie	Change UK
2019	Nadia Whittome	Labour

== Elections ==
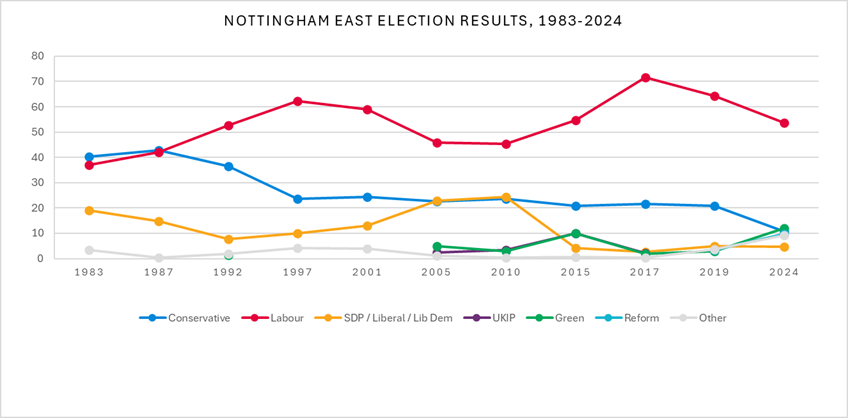
Nottingham east election results 1983-2024

=== Elections in the 2020s ===
General election 2024: Nottingham East
Party	Candidate	Votes	%	±%
Labour	Nadia Whittome	19,494	53.6	–9.5
Green	Rosey Palmer	4,332	11.9	+8.8
Conservative	Johno Lee	3,925	10.8	–10.0
Reform	Debbie Stephens	3,578	9.8	+6.4
Workers Party	Issan Ghazni	2,465	6.8	N/A
Liberal Democrats	Anita Prabhaker	1,741	4.8	–1.5
Independent	Naveed Rashid	494	1.4	N/A
Independent	Ali Khan	372	1.0	N/A
Majority		15,162	41.7	−1.8
Turnout		36,401	52.5	−7.9
Registered electors		69,395		
Labour hold		Swing	-9.2	

=== Elections in the 2010s ===
General election 2019: Nottingham East
Party	Candidate	Votes	%	±%
Labour	Nadia Whittome	25,735	64.3	−7.2
Conservative	Victoria Stapleton	8,342	20.8	−0.8
Liberal Democrats	Robert Swift	1,954	4.9	+2.3
The Independent Group for Change	Chris Leslie	1,447	3.6	New
Brexit Party	Damian Smith	1,343	3.4	New
Green	Michelle Vacciana	1,183	3.0	+1.2
Majority		17,393	43.5	−6.4
Turnout		40,004	60.4	−3.3
Labour hold		Swing	−3.15	

General election 2017: Nottingham East
Party	Candidate	Votes	%	±%
Labour Co-op	Chris Leslie	28,102	71.5	+16.9
Conservative	Simon Murray	8,512	21.6	+0.8
Liberal Democrats	Barry Holliday	1,003	2.6	−1.6
UKIP	Robert Hall-Palmer	817	2.1	−7.8
Green	Kat Boettge	698	1.8	−8.1
Elvis and the Yeti Himalayan Preservation Party	David Bishop	195	0.5	New
Majority		19,590	49.9	+16.1
Turnout		39,327	63.7	+5.5
Labour Co-op hold		Swing	+8.0	

General election 2015: Nottingham East
Party	Candidate	Votes	%	±%
Labour Co-op	Chris Leslie	19,208	54.6	+9.2
Conservative	Garry Hickton	7,314	20.8	−2.9
UKIP	Fran Loi	3,501	9.9	+6.5
Green	Antonia Zenkevitch	3,473	9.9	+7.1
Liberal Democrats	Tad Jones	1,475	4.2	−20.1
Independent	Seb Soar	141	0.4	New
Independent	James Stephenson	97	0.3	New
Majority		11,894	33.8	+12.7
Turnout		35,209	58.2	+1.8
Labour Co-op hold		Swing	+6.1	

General election 2010: Nottingham East
Party	Candidate	Votes	%	±%
Labour Co-op	Chris Leslie	15,022	45.4	
Liberal Democrats	Sam Boote	8,053	24.3	
Conservative	Ewan Lamont	7,846	23.7	
UKIP	Pat Wolfe	1,138	3.4	
Green	Benjamin Hoare	928	2.8	
Christian	Parvaiz Sardar	125	0.4	
Majority		6,969	21.1	
Turnout		33,112	56.4	
Labour Co-op win (new boundaries)				

=== Elections in the 2000s ===
General election 2005: Nottingham East
Party	Candidate	Votes	%	±%
Labour	John Heppell	13,787	45.8	−13.2
Liberal Democrats	Issan Ghazni	6,848	22.8	+9.8
Conservative	Jim Thornton	6,826	22.7	−1.6
Green	Ashley Baxter	1,517	5.0	New
UKIP	Anthony Ellwood	740	2.5	New
Socialist Unity	Pete Radcliff	373	1.2	New
Majority		6,939	23.0	−11.7
Turnout		30,091	49.6	+4.1
Labour hold		Swing	-11.5	

General election 2001: Nottingham East
Party	Candidate	Votes	%	±%
Labour	John Heppell	17,530	59.0	−3.3
Conservative	Richard Allan	7,210	24.3	+0.8
Liberal Democrats	Tim Ball	3,874	13.0	+2.9
Socialist Alliance	Pete Radcliff	1,117	3.8	New
Majority		10,320	34.7	−4.1
Turnout		29,731	45.5	−15.0
Labour hold		Swing	-2.0	

=== Elections in the 1990s ===
General election 1997: Nottingham East
Party	Candidate	Votes	%	±%
Labour	John Heppell	24,755	62.3	+9.7
Conservative	Andrew Raca	9,336	23.5	−12.9
Liberal Democrats	Kevin Mulloy	4,008	10.1	+2.3
Referendum	Ben Brown	1,645	4.1	New
Majority		15,419	38.8	+22.6
Turnout		39,744	60.5	−9.6
Labour hold		Swing		

General election 1992: Nottingham East
Party	Candidate	Votes	%	±%
Labour	John Heppell	25,026	52.6	+10.6
Conservative	Michael Knowles	17,346	36.4	−6.5
Liberal Democrats	Timothy Ball	3,695	7.8	−6.9
Green	Andrew Jones	667	1.4	New
Liberal	Charles Roylance	598	1.3	New
Natural Law	John Ashforth	283	0.6	New
Majority		7,680	16.2	+15.2
Turnout		47,615	70.1	+1.3
Labour gain from Conservative		Swing	+8.6	

=== Elections in the 1980s ===
General election 1987: Nottingham East
Party	Candidate	Votes	%	±%
Conservative	Michael Knowles	20,162	42.9	+2.5
Labour	Mohammed Aslam	19,706	42.0	+4.9
Liberal	Stephen Parkhouse	6,887	14.7	New
Red Front	Kenan Malik	212	0.4	New
Majority		456	0.9	
Turnout		46,967	68.8	+5.2
Conservative hold		Swing	-1.2	

General election 1983: Nottingham East
Party	Candidate	Votes	%	±%
Conservative	Michael Knowles	17,641	40.4	
Labour Co-op	Martyn Sloman	16,177	37.1	
SDP	Michael Bird	8,385	19.2	
Ind. Conservative	David Merrick	1,421	3.3	
Majority		1,464	3.3	
Turnout		43,624	63.6	−0.3
Conservative win (new boundaries)				

=== Elections in the 1970s ===
General election 1979: Nottingham East
Party	Candidate	Votes	%	±%
Labour	Jack Dunnett	15,433	50.5	−0.7
Conservative	Martin Brandon-Bravo	12,199	39.9	+7.1
Liberal	JD Hiley	2,270	7.4	−6.3
National Front	MA Cole	426	1.4	New
Socialist Unity	IB Juniper	252	0.8	New
Majority		3,234	10.6	
Turnout		30,580	63.9	+3.9
Labour hold		Swing	-3.9	

General election October 1974: Nottingham East
Party	Candidate	Votes	%	±%
Labour	Jack Dunnett	16,530	51.2	+4.3
Conservative	SM Swerling	10,574	32.8	−3.3
Liberal	EJ Rowan	4,442	13.8	−3.2
Ind. Labour Party	DW Peetz	736	2.3	New
Majority		5,956	18.4	+7.6
Turnout		32,282	60.0	−9.1
Labour hold		Swing	+3.8	

General election February 1974: Nottingham East
Party	Candidate	Votes	%	±%
Labour	Jack Dunnett	17,324	46.9	
Conservative	Richard Shepherd	13,346	36.1	
Liberal	EJ Rowan	6,294	17.0	
Majority		3,978	10.8	
Turnout		36,964	69.1	
Labour win (new seat)				

=== Elections in the 1950s ===
General election 1951: Nottingham East
Party	Candidate	Votes	%	±%
Labour	James Harrison	20,865	47.77	
Conservative	Sidney Shephard	20,601	47.17	
Liberal	Ruth Abrahams	2,209	5.06	
Majority		264	0.60	
Turnout		43,675	83.34	
Labour hold		Swing		

General election 1950: Nottingham East
Party	Candidate	Votes	%	±%
Labour	James Harrison	20,404	46.5	
Conservative	Louis Gluckstein	18,079	41.2	
Liberal	Edward Anthony Brooke Fletcher	5,368	12.2	
Majority		2,325	5.3	
Turnout		43,851	84.3	
Labour win (new boundaries)				

=== Elections in the 1940s ===
General election 1945: Nottingham East
Party	Candidate	Votes	%	±%
Labour	James Harrison	12,075	40.2	+14.5
Conservative	Louis Gluckstein	11,227	37.4	−20.3
Liberal	Patrick Seely	5,658	18.8	+2.2
Independent Labour	George Twells	1,072	3.6	New
Majority		848	2.8	N/A
Turnout		30,032	72.0	+3.9
Labour gain from Conservative		Swing		

Harrison's election necessitated the passing of an Act of Parliament to validate his election, as he held office as a member of a Pensions Appeal Tribunal and was therefore incapable of being elected.

General Election 1939–40: Another general election was required to take place before the end of 1940. The political parties had been making preparations for an election to take place from 1939 and by the end of this year, the following candidates had been selected;

- Conservative: Louis Gluckstein
- Labour: George Twells

=== Elections in the 1930s ===
General election 1935: Nottingham East
Party	Candidate	Votes	%	±%
Conservative	Louis Gluckstein	16,726	57.7	+7.4
Labour	M. Leon Freedman	7,435	25.7	+10.3
Liberal	Arthur Comyns Carr	4,819	16.6	−17.7
Majority		9,291	32.0	+16.0
Turnout		28,980	68.1	−10.7
Conservative hold		Swing		

General election 1931: Nottingham East
Party	Candidate	Votes	%	±%
Conservative	Louis Gluckstein	17,484	50.3	+18.5
Liberal	Norman Birkett	11,901	34.3	−5.9
Labour	Walter Windsor	5,339	15.4	−12.6
Majority		5,583	16.0	N/A
Turnout		34,724	78.8	−0.1
Conservative gain from Liberal		Swing		

=== Elections in the 1920s ===
General election 1929: Nottingham East
Party	Candidate	Votes	%	±%
Liberal	Norman Birkett	14,049	40.2	−1.4
Unionist	Louis Gluckstein	11,110	31.8	−15.8
Labour	James Baum	9,787	28.0	New
Majority		2,939	8.4	N/A
Turnout		34,946	78.9	+4.2
Liberal gain from Unionist		Swing	+7.2	

General election 1924: Nottingham East
Party	Candidate	Votes	%	±%
Unionist	Edmund Brocklebank	11,524	47.6	+1.0
Liberal	Norman Birkett	10,078	41.6	−11.8
Communist	Tom Mann	2,606	10.8	New
Majority		1,446	6.0	N/A
Turnout		24,208	74.7	+6.9
Unionist gain from Liberal		Swing		

General election 1923: Nottingham East
Party	Candidate	Votes	%	±%
Liberal	Norman Birkett	11,355	53.4	+13.1
Unionist	John Houfton	9,919	46.6	−13.1
Majority		1,436	6.8	N/A
Turnout		21,274	67.8	+1.6
Liberal gain from Unionist		Swing	+13.1	

General election 1922: Nottingham East
Party	Candidate	Votes	%	±%
Unionist	John Houfton	12,082	59.7	−6.0
Liberal	Edward Ernest Henry Atkin	8,170	40.3	N/A
Majority		3,912	19.4	−26.9
Turnout		20,252	66.2	+16.7
Unionist hold		Swing		

1922 Nottingham East by-election
Party		Candidate	Votes	%	±%
C	Unionist	John Houfton	10,404	52.3	−13.4
	Labour Co-op	A.H. Jones	5,431	27.3	+7.9
	Liberal	Thomas George Graham	4,065	20.4	New
Majority			4,973	25.0	−21.3
Turnout			19,900	66.3	+16.8
	Unionist hold		Swing	-10.6	
C indicates candidate endorsed by the coalition government.

=== Elections in the 1910s ===
General election 1918: Nottingham East
Party		Candidate	Votes	%	±%
C	Unionist	John Rees	9,549	65.7	
	Labour	Thomas Proctor	2,817	19.4	New
	NFDDSS	Joseph Nathaniel Dennis Brookes	2,166	14.9	New
Majority			6,732	46.3	
Turnout			14,532	49.5	
	Unionist win (new boundaries)				
C indicates candidate endorsed by the coalition government.

General Election 1914–15: Another General Election was required to take place before the end of 1915. The political parties had been making preparations for an election to take place and by July 1914, the following candidates had been selected;

- Unionist: John Rees
- Labour: Thomas Proctor

Dobson

Nottingham East by-election, 1912
Party	Candidate	Votes	%	±%
Unionist	John Rees	6,482	55.7	−0.9
Liberal	Thomas Dobson	5,158	44.3	+0.9
Majority		1,324	11.4	−1.8
Turnout		11,640	83.9	+0.1
Registered electors		13,866		
Unionist hold		Swing	−0.9	

Stewart-Smith

General election December 1910: Nottingham East
Party	Candidate	Votes	%	±%
Conservative	James Morrison	6,274	56.6	+5.9
Liberal	Dudley Stewart-Smith	4,804	43.4	−5.9
Majority		1,470	13.2	+11.8
Turnout		11,078	83.8	−4.0
Registered electors		13,218		
Conservative hold		Swing	+5.9	

General election January 1910: Nottingham East
Party	Candidate	Votes	%	±%
Conservative	James Morrison	5,877	50.7	+9.1
Liberal	Henry Cotton	5,725	49.3	−9.1
Majority		152	1.4	N/A
Turnout		11,602	87.8	+5.0
Registered electors		13,218		
Conservative gain from Liberal		Swing	+9.1	

=== Elections in the 1900s ===
General election 1906: Nottingham East
Party	Candidate	Votes	%	±%
Liberal	Henry Cotton	6,020	58.4	+12.7
Conservative	Edward Bond	4,290	41.6	−12.7
Majority		1,730	16.8	N/A
Turnout		10,310	82.8	+7.9
Registered electors		12,451		
Liberal gain from Conservative		Swing	+12.7	

Bond

General election 1900: Nottingham East
Party	Candidate	Votes	%	±%
Conservative	Edward Bond	4,927	54.3	+3.4
Liberal	Edward Hervey Fraser	4,148	45.7	−3.4
Majority		779	8.6	+6.8
Turnout		9,075	74.9	−7.9
Registered electors		12,109		
Conservative hold		Swing	+3.4	

=== Elections in the 1890s ===
General election 1895: Nottingham East
Party	Candidate	Votes	%	±%
Conservative	Edward Bond	4,900	50.9	+4.1
Liberal	Arnold Morley	4,735	49.1	−4.1
Majority		165	1.8	N/A
Turnout		9,635	82.8	+7.8
Registered electors		12,451		
Conservative gain from Liberal		Swing	+4.1	

By-election, 24 Aug 1892: Nottingham East
Party	Candidate	Votes	%	±%
Liberal	Arnold Morley	Unopposed		
Liberal hold				

- Morley was appointed Postmaster General, requiring a by-election.

General election 1892: Nottingham East
Party	Candidate	Votes	%	±%
Liberal	Arnold Morley	4,861	53.2	+2.3
Conservative	Harold Finch-Hatton	4,284	46.8	−2.3
Majority		577	6.4	+4.6
Turnout		9,145	81.6	+11.0
Registered electors		11,204		
Liberal hold		Swing	+2.3	

=== Elections in the 1880s ===
General election 1886: Nottingham East
Party	Candidate	Votes	%	±%
Liberal	Arnold Morley	4,584	50.9	−4.3
Conservative	Harold Finch-Hatton	4,418	49.1	+4.3
Majority		166	1.8	−8.6
Turnout		9,002	70.6	−3.8
Registered electors		12,749		
Liberal hold		Swing	−4.3	

General election 1885: Nottingham East
Party	Candidate	Votes	%	±%
Liberal	Arnold Morley	5,239	55.2	
Conservative	Harold Finch-Hatton	4,248	44.8	
Majority		991	10.4	
Turnout		9,487	74.4	
Registered electors		12,749		
Liberal win (new seat)				

== See also ==
- List of parliamentary constituencies in Nottinghamshire
