= Lilian Greenwood =

British Labour politician (born 1966)

Lilian Greenwood MP
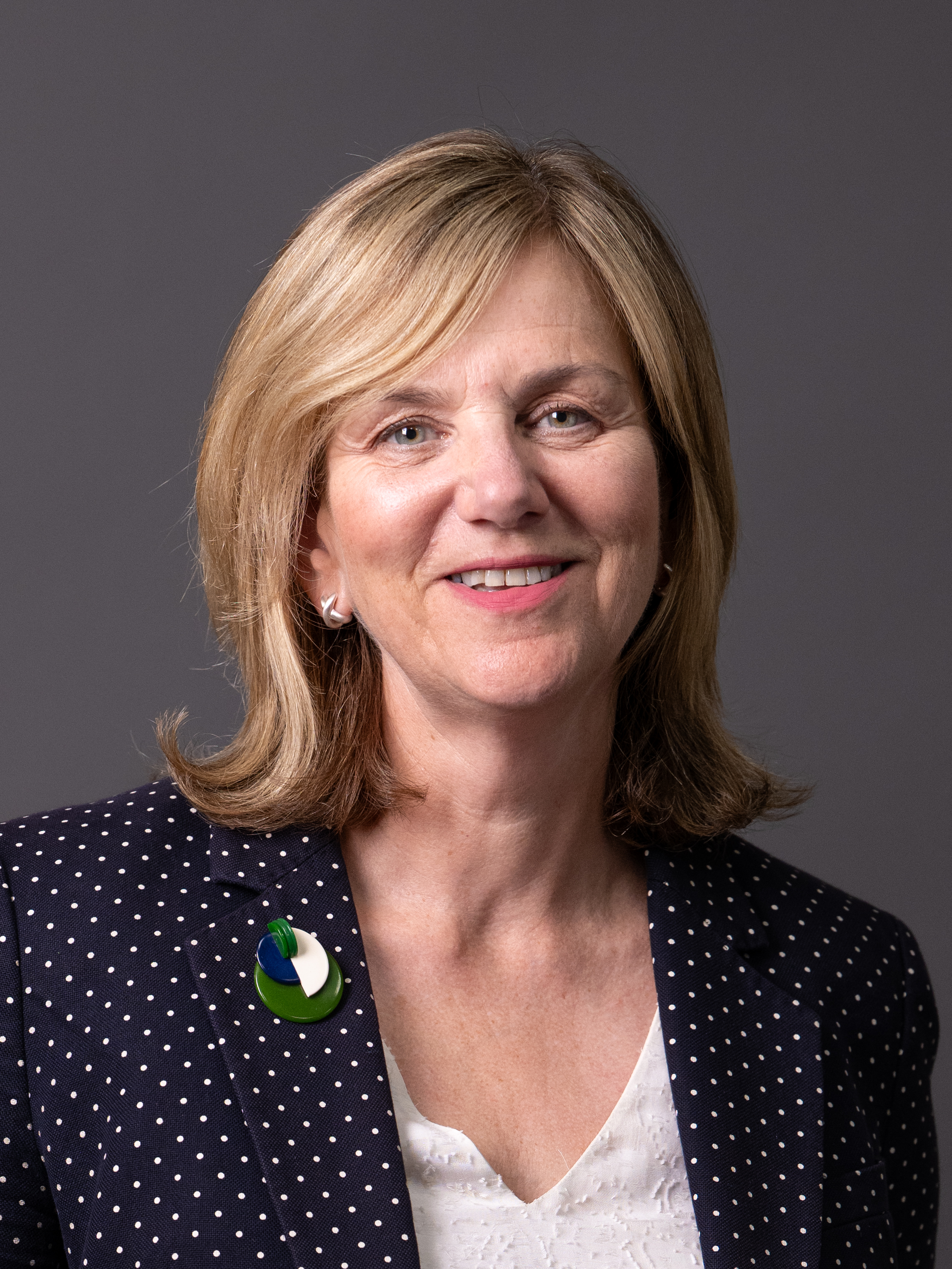
- Official portrait, 2026

Parliamentary Under-Secretary of State for Innovation, Fraud and Data
- Incumbent
- Assumed office 22 July 2026
- Prime Minister: Andy Burnham
- Preceded by: Andrew Western

Parliamentary Under-Secretary of State for Local Transport
- In office 16 September 2025 – 22 July 2026
- Prime Minister: Keir Starmer
- Preceded by: Simon Lightwood
- Succeeded by: Simon Lightwood

Lord Commissioner of the Treasury
- In office 16 September 2025 – 22 July 2026
- Prime Minister: Keir Starmer

Vice-Chamberlain of the Household
- In office 7 September 2025 – 16 September 2025
- Prime Minister: Keir Starmer
- Preceded by: Samantha Dixon
- Succeeded by: Nic Dakin

Parliamentary Under-Secretary of State for Future of Roads
- In office 5 July 2024 – 7 September 2025
- Prime Minister: Keir Starmer
- Preceded by: Guy Opperman
- Succeeded by: Simon Lightwood

Chair of the Finance Committee
- In office 29 January 2020 – 25 May 2021
- Preceded by: Chris Bryant
- Succeeded by: Nick Brown

Chair of the Transport Committee
- In office 13 July 2017 – 29 January 2020
- Preceded by: Louise Ellman
- Succeeded by: Huw Merriman

Member of Parliament for Nottingham South
- Incumbent
- Assumed office 6 May 2010
- Preceded by: Alan Simpson
- Majority: 10,294 (31.3%)
Shadow portfolios
Shadow Cabinet
| 2015–2016 | Transport |
Shadow Frontbench
| 2023–2024 | Arts, Heritage and Civil Society |
| 2021–2023 | Deputy Chief Whip |
| 2011–2015 | Rail |
| 2010–2011 | Assistant Whip |

Personal details
- Born: Lilian Rachel Greenwood; 26 March 1966 (age 60) Bolton, Lancashire, England
- Party: Labour
- Children: 3
- Education: St Catharine's College, Cambridge (BA)
- Website: www.liliangreenwood.co.uk

Lilian Rachel Greenwood (born 26 March 1966) is a British politician who has served as Member of Parliament (MP) for Nottingham South since 2010. A member of the Labour Party, she has served as a Parliamentary Under-Secretary of State at the Department for Work and Pensions since July 2026 and was Parliamentary Under-Secretary of State for Local Transport from September 2025 to July 2026.

A former union official, she served as the Shadow Secretary of State for Transport in Jeremy Corbyn's shadow cabinet from 2015 until her resignation in 2016, and as a shadow transport minister under opposition leader Ed Miliband from 2011 to 2015. On the back benches, Greenwood chaired the Transport Select Committee from 2017 to 2020, and the Commons Finance Committee from 2020 to 2021. She served as the Opposition Deputy Chief Whip of the House of Commons between 2021 and 2023, the Shadow Minister for Arts, Heritage and Civil Society from 2023 until 2024, and in Keir Starmer's government, the Parliamentary Under-Secretary of State for Future of Roads from 2024 to 2025.

== Early life and career ==
Greenwood was born on 26 March 1966 in Bolton, Lancashire. She attended Canon Slade School, a local Church of England state secondary school, before attending St. Catharine's College, Cambridge.

Moving to Southwell, Nottinghamshire in 1999, Greenwood worked in the county for Unison, the public sector trade union, for 17 years.

== Parliamentary career ==
Greenwood was selected as the Labour Party candidate for the 2010 general election after the incumbent Labour MP, Alan Simpson, announced in 2007 that he would not stand for re-election. She was elected as the MP with 37.3% of the vote, a margin of 4.4% over her closest rival.

Shortly after her election, she joined the Transport Select Committee, and was subsequently appointed as an assistant opposition whip. In late September 2011, she was promoted by Labour leader Ed Miliband to the role of Shadow Minister for Rail, a position she held until her re-election in the 2015 general election.

Following the election of Jeremy Corbyn as Leader of the Labour Party, on 14 September 2015 she was promoted to the Shadow cabinet as the Shadow Secretary of State for Transport.

Greenwood resigned from the Shadow Cabinet in the aftermath of the 2016 EU referendum, along with dozens of her colleagues, in protest against what she saw as Jeremy Corbyn's weak leadership. She supported Owen Smith in the failed attempt to replace Jeremy Corbyn in the 2016 Labour Party leadership election.

As a backbencher, Greenwood has chaired the Transport Select Committee and the Commons Finance Committee, and sat on the Liaison Committee, Education Select Committee and Regulatory Reform Committee.

She was re-elected at the 2017 and 2019 General Elections, and backed Lisa Nandy in the 2020 Labour Party leadership election.

Greenwood returned to the opposition front bench in May 2021, when she was appointed by Labour leader Keir Starmer as the Opposition Deputy Chief Whip of the House of Commons for legislation, succeeding Alan Campbell following his promotion to Chief Whip.

Greenwood is a member of Labour Friends of Israel.

== Personal life ==
Greenwood is married with three children.

Parliament of the United Kingdom
| Preceded by Alan Simpson | Member of Parliament for Nottingham South; 2010–present | Incumbent |
Political offices
| Preceded by Michael Dugher | Shadow Secretary of State for Transport; 2015–2016 | Succeeded by Andy McDonald |
Party political offices
| Preceded by Alan Campbell | Labour Deputy Chief Whip in the House of Commons; 2021–2023 | Succeeded by Mark Tami |
