= Pascale Quiviger =

Canadian writer and artist

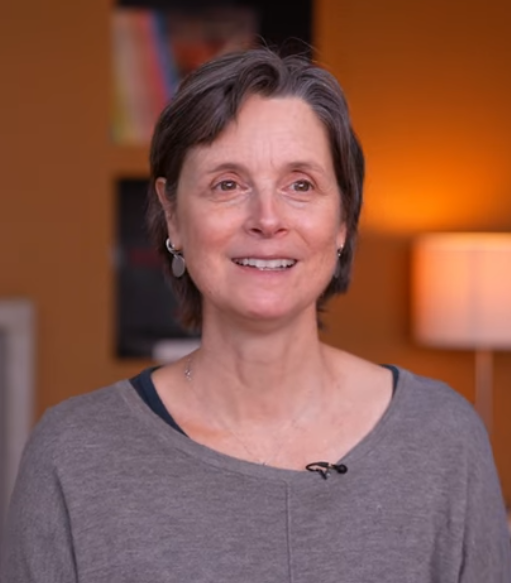
- In a 2026 interview
- Born: 1969 (age 56–57)
- Occupations: Writer, artist
- Spouse: Alan Simpson
- Awards: Governor General's Literary Award

Pascale Quiviger (born 1969) is a Canadian writer and artist. Raised and educated in Quebec, she is currently based in the United Kingdom, where she writes, paints, teaches visual arts and practices hypnotherapy. Quiviger is married to former British Labour MP Alan Simpson and lives in Nottingham.

Quiviger published her first volume of short stories, Ni sols ni ciels (Instant même), in 2001, and her first novel, Le Cercle parfait, in 2004. Le Cercle parfait won the 2004 Governor General's Award for French Fiction; its English translation by Sheila Fischman, The Perfect Circle, was shortlisted for the 2006 Scotiabank Giller Prize. She followed this with an essay, Un point de chute, in 2006, and two novels, La Maison des temps rompus in 2008 and Pages à brûler in 2010. She is also the author of an artist book, Below Zero, published in 2005. In 2020, Lazer Lederhendler's English translation of Quiviger's novel If You Hear Me, won the Governor General's Literary Award.

== Sources ==
- "ER doctor's debut work wins Giller Prize". CTV.
- "Toews, Dallaire win Governor General's Awards". CBC. November 17, 2004.
- Debby Waldman (April 30, 2010). "Uneven sophomore effort ignores basic writing rule: show, don't tell". Edmonton Journal.
