= George Perry (British politician) =

George Henry Perry (24 August 1920 – June 1998) was a Labour Party politician in the United Kingdom.

Perry unsuccessfully contested Harborough at the 1964 general election.

He was Member of Parliament for the marginal Nottingham South constituency from 1966 until his defeat at the 1970 general election by the Conservative Party candidate Norman Fowler, who was later a cabinet minister.

Parliament of the United Kingdom
Preceded by William Clark	Member of Parliament for Nottingham South; 1966–1970	Succeeded by Norman Fowler
