= Michael Knowles (politician) =

Politician from England

Councillor, Royal Borough of Kingston upon Thames
- In office 13 May 1971 – 1983

Leader of the Council, Royal Borough of Kingston upon Thames
- In office 1974–1983

Member of Parliament for Nottingham East
- In office 9 June 1983 – 16 March 1992
- Preceded by: Jack Dunnett
- Succeeded by: John Heppell

Personal details
- Born: 21 May 1942 (age 84)
- Party: Conservative

Michael Knowles (born 21 May 1942) is a British Conservative politician and former Member of Parliament.

== Political career ==
From 1971–1983 he was a member of the Council of the Royal Borough of Kingston upon Thames and Leader of the Council from 1974–1983.

Knowles first stood for Parliament for the Labour Welsh stronghold of Merthyr Tydfil at the February 1974 General Election, coming third. In the October election of that year he fought the London seat of Brent East, again being defeated.

He was elected MP for Nottingham East from 1983 until he lost the seat at the 1992 general election to Labour's John Heppell.

Parliament of the United Kingdom
Preceded by Jack Dunnett	Member of Parliament for Nottingham East; 1983–1992	Succeeded by John Heppell
