= Frank Markham =

British politician (1897–1975)

Sir Sydney Markham
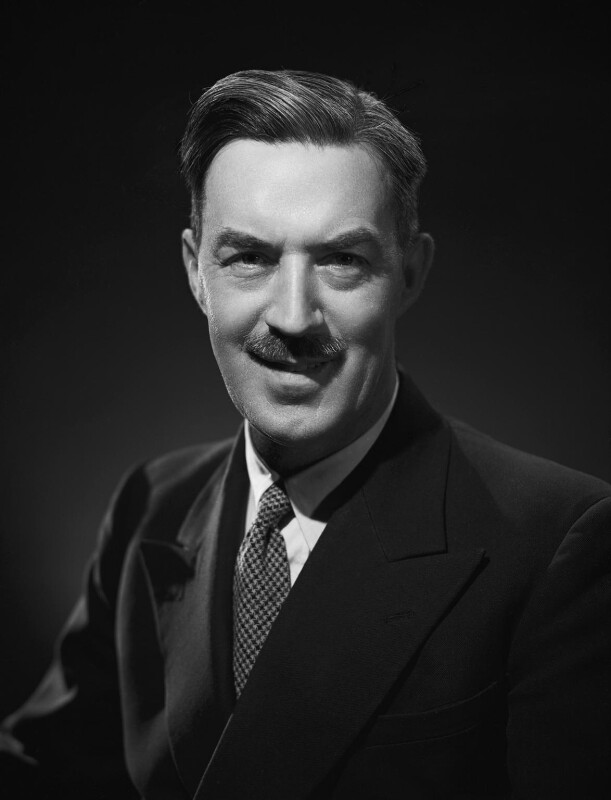
- Frank Markham in April 1948

Member of Parliament for Buckingham
- In office 15 October 1951 – 25 September 1964
- Preceded by: Aidan Crawley
- Succeeded by: Robert Maxwell

Member of Parliament for Nottingham South
- In office 14 November 1935 – 15 June 1945
- Preceded by: Holford Knight
- Succeeded by: Norman Smith

Member of Parliament for Chatham
- In office 30 May 1929 – 7 October 1931
- Preceded by: John Moore-Brabazon
- Succeeded by: Park Goff

Parliamentary Private Secretary to the Prime Minister
- In office 1931–1932 Serving with John Worthington & Ralph Glyn
- Prime Minister: Ramsay McDonald
- Preceded by: Robert Morrison
- Succeeded by: John Worthington & Ralph Glyn

Personal details
- Born: Sydney Frank Markham; 19 October 1897 Stony Stratford, England
- Died: 13 October 1975 (aged 77) Leighton Buzzard, England
- Party: Conservative (after c. 1950)
- Other political affiliations: Labour (until 1931); National Labour (1931–1945)
- Spouse: Frances Lowman (m. 1928)
- Children: 5
- Education: Wadham College, Oxford

Military service
- Branch/service: British Army
- Years of service: until 1921
- Battles/wars: First World War

Sir Sydney Frank Markham (19 October 1897 – 13 October 1975) was a British politician who represented three constituencies, each on behalf of a different party, in Parliament. He was elected as the Labour member for Chatham from 1929, and defected to the National Labour Organisation by the 1931 election, at which he was returned as the member for Nottingham South. He served until his defeat in 1945. He then joined the Conservative Party, and was the MP for Buckingham from 1951 to 1964.

== Background ==
Born in Stony Stratford, he left school at the age of fourteen. Following service in France, Greece and Mesopotamia during the First World War, he was awarded a commission, and left the Army in 1921. He studied at Wadham College, Oxford and then became an assistant to Sir Sidney Lee with his work on Shakespeare. He later became Secretary, then President, of the Museums Association.

== Political career ==
Having fought Guildford for Labour in 1924, he was elected for that party at the 1929 general election as MP for Chatham, and defected with Ramsay MacDonald to become a National Labour MP just before standing down at the 1931 general election. It was under these colours that he was elected for Nottingham South in 1935. He lost this seat standing as a 'National Independent' in the 1945 general election, following the official dissolution of National Labour.

At the 1950 general election, he stood as the Conservative candidate in the Buckingham constituency, but failed to unseat the sitting Labour Member of Parliament, Aidan Crawley. However, at the 1951 general election, he beat Crawley by a majority of only 54 votes. He held the seat with narrow majorities at the 1955 election and at the 1959 election and stood down before the 1964 general election.

== Personal life ==
In 1928, Markham married Frances Lawman from Newport Pagnel, and they had five children Three boys and two girls.

He was conferred the honour of Knighthood by Queen Elizabeth II on 30 June 1953 in the 1953 Coronation Honours. He was a Fellow of the Royal Historical Society, the Royal Meteorological Society and the Royal Geographical Society.

In retirement, he was best noted for his A History of Milton Keynes and District (two volumes) ISBN 0-900804-29-7 (see History of Milton Keynes). A secondary school in Milton Keynes, Buckinghamshire - now replaced - was named after him. He died at his home in Leighton Buzzard, Bedfordshire, on 13 October 1975, and is buried in Calverton Road cemetery, Stony Stratford in Milton Keynes, along with his wife Frances.

Parliament of the United Kingdom
Preceded by John Moore-Brabazon	Member of Parliament for Chatham; 1929–1931	Succeeded by Sir Park Goff
Preceded by Holford Knight	Member of Parliament for Nottingham South; 1935–1945	Succeeded by Norman Smith
Preceded by Aidan Crawley	Member of Parliament for Buckingham; 1951–1964	Succeeded by Robert Maxwell
Government offices
Preceded by Robert Morrison	Parliamentary Private Secretary to the Prime Minister; 1931–1932 serving alongside John Worthington and Ralph Glyn	Succeeded by John Worthington and Ralph Glyn
