= Henry Smith Wright =

British barrister, banker, politician and rower (1839–1910)

Henry Smith Wright (27 June 1839 – 19 March 1910) was an English barrister, banker and Conservative Party politician who sat in the House of Commons from 1885 to 1895.

Wright was born at Quarndon, Derbyshire the third son of Ichabod Charles Wright of Watnall Hall, Nottinghamshire. He was educated at Brighton College and admitted to Trinity College, Cambridge on 29 January 1858. He was a scholar in 1861 and also that year rowed in the winning First Trinity Boat Club coxed four which won the Stewards' Challenge Cup at Henley Royal Regatta. He was admitted at the Inner Temple on 20 August 1862 and called to the bar on 30 April 1866.

Wright was a member of his father's banking firm in Nottingham from 1867 to 1878. With his father he published a selection of psalms in verse. He translated the Iliad, I-IV into English hexameters, and the Aeneid, I-VI into blank verse.

Wright stood unsuccessfully for Nottingham South in 1885 but was elected Member of Parliament (MP) for South Nottingham at the 1886 general election. He held the seat until he stood down in 1895.

Wright lived at Mapperley Hall, Nottinghamshire and died at the age of 70.

Wright married Mary Jane Cartledge, only daughter of William Cartledge, of Woodthorpe in 1865. He married secondly in 1869, Josephine Henrietta Wright, his first cousin, daughter of the Rev. John Adolphus Wright, rector of Ickham, Kent, and had four sons and one daughter.

Parliament of the United Kingdom
Preceded by John Williams	Member of Parliament for Nottingham South; 1886–1895	Succeeded by Lord Henry Cavendish-Bentinck
