= Cecil Caporn =

British Politician

Arthur Cecil Caporn (16 April 1884 – 25 November 1953) was a British judge and Conservative Party politician.

Born in Radcliffe-on-Trent, Nottinghamshire, he was the son of Arthur Leeson Caporn, owner of a Nottingham lace-making business. His father also had business interests in South Africa, and the family spent some years in the Cape Town area. He was educated at South African College School and Trinity Hall, Cambridge. He took a second in the Law Tripos in 1905. He was called to the bar at the Middle Temple in 1907, and practised as a barrister in Sheffield. He also lectured in common law at the University of Sheffield.

During the First World War Caporn served as an officer in the Royal Field Artillery. He was invalided home in 1916, spending the rest of the war as an intelligence officer in the United Kingdom. He remained on the reserve of officers until 1934, reaching the rank of major.

At the 1931 general election he was chosen by the Conservatives to contest Nottingham West, which was held by Arthur Hayday of the Labour Party. Caporn won the seat in a bitterly fought contest, but only served a single term in Commons with Hayday regaining the constituency in 1935.

Returning to his legal career, in 1939 Caporn was appointed a county court judge. He remained on the bench until his death.

He married Dorothy Frances Marriott of Nottingham in Q2, 1912 at Bingham, and the couple had a daughter and two sons.

- Year Quarter Surname First name(s) District
- 1915 4 Caporn Dorothy Ecclesall B
- 1917 1 Caporn Peter M Ecclesall B.
- 1924 1 Caporn Derek C Wandsworth

He died in Saxondale Hospital in November 1953 aged 69.

Parliament of the United Kingdom
| Preceded by Arthur Hayday | Member of Parliament for Nottingham West; 1931–1935 | Succeeded by Arthur Hayday |
