= Holford Knight =

British politician (1877–1936)

George Wilfrid Holford Knight (23 April 1877 – 26 April 1936) was Liberal parliamentary candidate and later Labour Party then National Labour MP for Nottingham South.

Knight was educated at the University of London before becoming a barrister with Middle Temple. He was attached to the Central Criminal Court from 1911 to 1930, and then served as Recorder of West Ham from 1930 to 1937.

He first fought Wokingham in January 1910, and Bromley in 1918, both as a Liberal. He then moved to the Labour Party, contesting Hackney South twice in 1922, and Plymouth Devonport in 1924. He won Nottingham South for Labour from the Conservatives in 1929, held the seat as a National Labour candidate in 1931, but stood down in 1935.

Parliament of the United Kingdom
Preceded by Lord Henry Cavendish-Bentinck	Member of Parliament for Nottingham South; 1929 – 1935	Succeeded by Frank Markham
