= Michael English (politician) =

British politician (1930–2019)

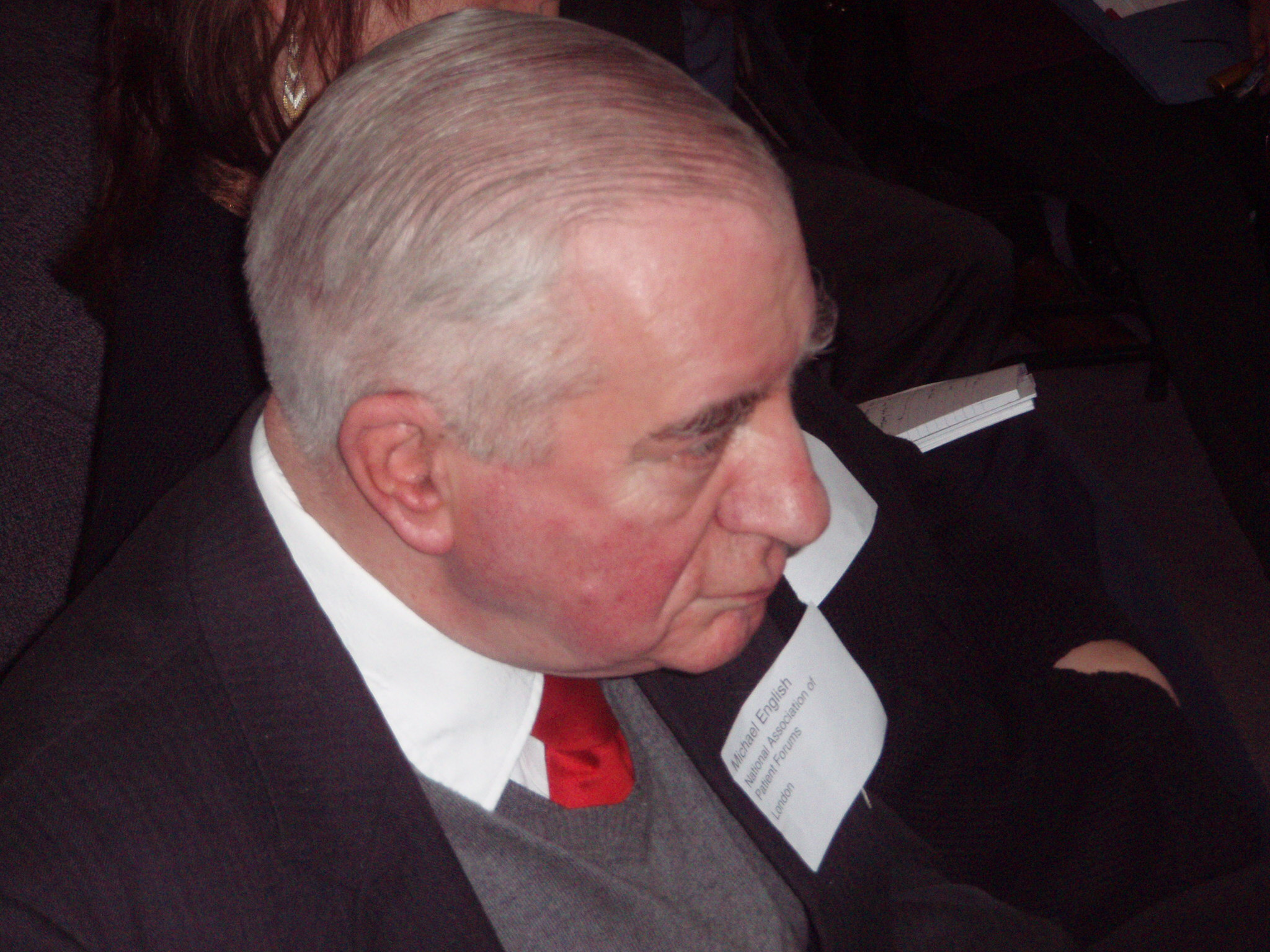
- English in 2008

Member of Parliament for Nottingham West
- In office 15 October 1964 – 13 May 1983
- Preceded by: Peter Tapsell
- Succeeded by: constituency abolished

Personal details
- Born: 24 December 1930
- Died: 16 July 2019 (aged 88)
- Party: Labour
- Education: Liverpool University

Michael English (24 December 1930 – 16 July 2019) was a British Labour Party politician.

== Early life ==
English was educated at King George V Grammar School, Southport and Liverpool University. He was a councillor on Rochdale Borough Council 1953–65.

== Parliamentary career ==
English contested Shipley in 1959. He was Member of Parliament for Nottingham West from 1964 to 1983, when the seat was abolished by boundary changes. Following his retirement from Parliament, he served as a councillor in the London Borough of Lambeth. He was an opponent of Britain's membership of the EEC.

He was subsequently Chairman of the London Local Involvement Network.

English was interviewed in 2012 as part of The History of Parliament's oral history project.

== Subsequent ==
He was later active in the National Association of LINks Members, the Healthwatch network, Community Health Councils and Public and Patient Involvement Forums. He was a leading figure in the Patients' Forum for the London Ambulance Service.

== Personal life ==
He married Carol Christine Owen on 11 September 1976 at Burton Coggles in south Lincolnshire. They had a daughter, born in 1978, and a son, born in 1980. They met in 1969 in Chelsea, London, where they both lived. In 1978 they moved to the London Borough of Lambeth, where English served as a local councillor. English died in July 2019 at the age of 88.

== Notes ==
Parliament of the United Kingdom
Preceded by Peter Tapsell	Member of Parliament for Nottingham West; 1964–1983	Constituency abolished
