= Louis Gluckstein =

British lawyer and politician (1897–1979)

Portrait by Walter Stoneman, 1937

Sir Louis Halle Gluckstein GBE TD KC DL (23 February 1897 – 27 October 1979) was a British lawyer and Conservative Party politician.

== Family ==
Gluckstein was born in Hampstead, London, the son of Joseph Gluckstein, whose brothers (Isidore and Montague) founded the J. Lyons and Co. coffee house and catering empire in London. His mother, Francesca Halle, was an American opera singer, and his elder sibling Gluck (born Hannah Gluckstein) was a painter.

== Career ==
Gluckstein was educated at St Paul's School and Lincoln College, Oxford. He was commissioned into the Suffolk Regiment during the First World War and also saw action as a captain in the Second World War, being mentioned in dispatches in the early part of the war. He remained in the Territorial Army until his retirement in 1948, and was awarded the Territorial Decoration in 1947.

Gluckstein was elected as Member of Parliament (MP) for Nottingham East at the 1931 general election, having contested the seat unsuccessfully in 1929. He held the seat until his defeat at the 1945 general election by the Labour candidate James Harrison. Gluckstein stood again in 1950, losing again to Harrison. At 2.02 m (6 ft 8 in), he is believed to have been the tallest Member of Parliament until the election of Daniel Kawczynski in 2005.

He was a Conservative councillor on the London County Council for St Marylebone from 1950 until its abolition in 1964, then on the Greater London Council for Westminster and the City of London from 1964 to 1967, and as an Alderman from 1967 to 1973.

He was appointed as a King's Counsel on 29 June 1945. He was appointed a Deputy Lieutenant of the County of London in 1952, knighted in the Coronation Honours of 1953, was made a Commander of the Order of the British Empire (CBE) in the 1964 New Year Honours, and was promoted to Knight Grand Cross (GBE) in the 1969 Birthday Honours.

== Arms ==
Coat of arms of Louis Gluckstein
Motto L'Union Fait La Force

Parliament of the United Kingdom
Preceded by Norman Birkett	Member of Parliament for Nottingham East; 1931–1945	Succeeded by James Harrison
Civic offices
Preceded by Percy Rugg	Chairman of the Greater London Council; 1968–1969	Succeeded by Leslie Freeman
Political offices
Preceded by Reg Goodwin	Chairman of the Finance Committee of London County Council; 1967–1968	Succeeded by Roland Freeman
