= Alan Simpson (British politician) =

British politician

Member of Parliament for Nottingham South
- In office 10 April 1992 – 12 April 2010
- Preceded by: Martin Brandon-Bravo
- Succeeded by: Lilian Greenwood

Personal details
- Born: 20 September 1948 (age 78) Bootle, Lancashire, England
- Party: Labour
- Spouse: Pascale Quiviger
- Education: Trent Polytechnic

Alan John Simpson (born 20 September 1948) is a British former Labour Party politician who was the Member of Parliament (MP) for Nottingham South from 1992 to 2010.

== Early life ==
Simpson attended Bootle Grammar School for Boys and studied economics at Trent Polytechnic before graduating in 1972.

During his time at the University, he was the President of the Student Union from 1969 to 1970.

After graduating in 1972, he became a community worker, holding the post of Assistant General Secretary at the Nottingham Council of Voluntary Service from 1970 to 1974, and working on an anti-vandalism project from 1974 to 1978. He later became a research officer for the city's Racial Equality Council from 1979 to 1992.

Simpson joined the Labour Party in 1973, and was then elected as a county councillor in 1985.

== Parliamentary career ==
Simpson contested the Nottingham South seat in the 1987 general election, before being elected as MP for the area in the 1992 election.

During his career, Simpson was on the left wing of the Labour Party, Simpson was the Secretary of the Socialist Campaign Group of MPs between 1995–2001 and Treasurer from 2001–2002.

Simpson also established Labour Against the War in 2001 which opposed the Afghan war and occupation of Iraq and was on the board of the left-wing Tribune magazine. Simpson led the campaign to retain the original wording of Clause IV.

Simpson was a member of the Environment, Food and Rural Affairs Committee from May 2004 until April 2005.

On 31 October 2006, Simpson was among the 12 Labour MPs to back Plaid Cymru and the Scottish National Party's call for an inquiry into the Iraq War.

On 18 February 2007, Simpson announced his intention to stand down at the next general election. The reasons for this included his belief that campaigning would be better done outside of parliament, alongside disapproval for the Parliamentary Labour Party, of which he said: "There are good people in the Parliamentary Labour Party but not enough of them. At times, I feel that colleagues would vote for the slaughter of the first born if asked to." Simpson also cited the birth of his daughter the previous year as a reason.

== Expenses controversy ==
Simpson was asked to pay back £500 that he was accused of over-claiming in cleaning bills by the auditor of MPs' expenses, Thomas Legg. Legg has been openly challenged by Simpson who refuses to return the money. Simpson threatened to take Legg to court over this matter.

== Personal life ==
Simpson married Pascale Quiviger, a French-Canadian author and painter, in July 2005 at Newstead Abbey, the ancestral home of Lord Byron. They have a daughter born in January 2006. He has two sons and a daughter from a previous marriage.

Alan Simpson plays tennis and cricket, along with supporting Everton F.C.

== Notes ==
Parliament of the United Kingdom
Preceded by Martin Brandon-Bravo	Member of Parliament for Nottingham South; 1992 – 2010	Succeeded by Lilian Greenwood
