= William Clark, Baron Clark of Kempston =

British politician and peer (1917–2004)

The Right Honourable The Lord Clark of Kempston PC
- Clark in 1966

Member of Parliament for Croydon South East Surrey (1970–74)
- In office 18 June 1970 – 16 March 1992
- Preceded by: Charles Doughty
- Succeeded by: Richard Ottaway

Member of Parliament for Nottingham South
- In office 8 October 1959 – 10 March 1966
- Preceded by: Denis Keegan
- Succeeded by: George Perry

Member of the House of Lords
- Lord Temporal
- Life peerage 21 July 1992 – 6 October 2004

Personal details
- Born: William Gibson Haig Clark; 18 October 1917
- Died: 6 October 2004 (aged 86)
- Party: Conservative
- Spouse: Irene Rands
- Children: 4
- Education: Battersea Polytechnic
- Awards: Knight Bachelor (1980)

Military service
- Allegiance: United Kingdom
- Branch/service: British Army
- Years of service: 1941–1946
- Rank: Major
- Unit: Royal Army Ordnance Corps
- Battles/wars: Second World War

William Gibson Haig Clark, Baron Clark of Kempston, PC (18 October 1917 – 6 October 2004) was a British Conservative politician who sat for a total of 28 years as a member of Parliament for three constituencies. He was also a Member of the House of Lords.

== Early life ==
Clark was educated at Battersea Polytechnic, qualifying in accountancy in 1941. From 1941 to 1946 he served in World War II in Britain and India in the Royal Army Ordnance Corps, gaining the rank of major. He became involved in business, particularly investing in cane sugar production, with interests in St Kitts and Belize, and in property in the UK. He was also a consultant to Tate&Lyle.

== Political career ==
In 1949, Clark was elected to Wandsworth Borough Council, serving until 1953. He was unsuccessful in his attempt to win a seat on the London County Council and stood without success in the 1955 general election in Northampton.

Clark was elected to Parliament for Nottingham South in 1959, serving on the opposition front bench from 1964 to 1966, the only period in his career. He lost his seat in 1966. He returned to Parliament as the MP for East Surrey in 1970, and from 1974 until he retired in 1992 for its largely successor seat after boundary changes, Croydon South. Geoffrey Howe succeeded him in the East Surrey seat when boundary changes meant he was transferred from the Reigate seat close by. He was active in the 1970s in restoring Conservative Party finances to a sustainable levels. He identified with the right wing of the party and voted against British membership of the European Community in 1971. He chaired the Conservative backbench Finance Committee from 1979 until 1992, encouraging Margaret Thatcher to pursue financial stability and free enterprise and defending her policies on television and radio. He was knighted in 1980 and in 1990 was made a Privy Counsellor.

Following his retirement Clark received a life peerage on 21 July 1992 as Baron Clark of Kempston, of Kempston in the County of Bedfordshire, and was an active contributor to House of Lords debates.

== Personal life ==
Clark was married to Irene Rands and had three sons and a daughter.

== Arms ==
Coat of arms of William Clark, Baron Clark of Kempston
Crest A demi-unicorn Azure winged armed crined and unguled Or collared chequy Argent and Azure and supporting with the forelegs a thistle plant flowered Proper. Escutcheon Erminois on a pile Azure between two quills pilewise points in roundels in pile of the last. Supporters Dexter a lion Gules gorged with a collar chequy Argent and Azure pendent therefrom by a cord Or an escallop Argent and resting the interior hid paw on a portcullis Gold sinister a unicorn Azure winged horned unguled and crined Or gorged with a collar chequy Argent and Azure pendent therefrom by a cord Gold an escallop Argent and resting the interior hoof on a bezant. Motto Perseverantia Cum Perceptione

Parliament of the United Kingdom
Preceded by Denis Keegan	Member of Parliament for Nottingham South; 1959–1966	Succeeded by George Perry
Preceded by Charles Doughty	Member of Parliament for East Surrey; 1970–1974	Succeeded by Himself as MP for Croydon South
Preceded by Charles Doughty	Member of Parliament for East Surrey; 1970–1974	Succeeded by Geoffrey Howe as MP for East Surrey (Redrawn)
Preceded by Himself as MP for East Surrey	Member of Parliament for Croydon South; 1974–1992	Succeeded by Richard Ottaway
