= Martin Brandon-Bravo =

British politician (1932–2018)

Member of Parliament for Nottingham South
- In office 9 June 1983 – 16 March 1992
- Preceded by: new constituency
- Succeeded by: Alan Simpson

Personal details
- Born: 25 March 1932 Stoke Newington, England
- Died: 15 August 2018 (aged 86) Nottingham, England
- Party: Conservative

Martin Maurice Brandon-Bravo OBE (25 March 1932 – 15 August 2018) was a British Conservative politician who was Member of Parliament (MP) for Nottingham South from 1983 to 1992.

== Career ==
Born into a Jewish family, he served as a Conservative councillor for the City of Nottingham 1968–1970 and 1976–1987. Having stood unsuccessfully for Nottingham East in the 1979 general election, he was Member of Parliament (MP) for Nottingham South from 1983 to 1992 when he was defeated by Labour's Alan Simpson. In his time in Parliament he became Parliamentary Private Secretary to the Home Secretary, David Waddington (1989–1990), and subsequently to the Leader of the Lords (1990–1992).

After leaving Parliament, he became Councillor for West Bridgford West division of Nottinghamshire County Council (NCC) from 1993, serving as Deputy Leader of the party group, until retiring at the 2009 elections. Reflecting his economic and political contributions, he was appointed as an alderman of NCC in July 2009 and of the City of Nottingham in January 2012.

== Sport ==
Brandon-Bravo was a successful club oarsman before becoming president of the forerunner to the present body in the sport of rowing, the Amateur Rowing Association, in 1993. He was a life Vice President of British Rowing, which has combined professionals and amateurs in one organisation. As an International Umpire he officiated at World and Olympic Championships, and was a founding member of the National Watersports Centre at Holme Pierrepont, Nottingham.

== Personal life ==
He married Sally in 1964 and they had two sons, Paul and Joel.

Brandon-Bravo died in August 2018 at the age of 86.

== Bibliography ==
- Brandon-Bravo, Martin (2013). Rowing Against the Tide. Bretwalda. ISBN 9781909698031.

Parliament of the United Kingdom
New constituency	Member of Parliament for Nottingham South; 1983–1992	Succeeded by Alan Simpson
