= James Harrison (Labour politician) =

James Harrison (30 August 1899 – 2 May 1959) was a Labour Party politician in the United Kingdom.

He was elected as Member of Parliament (MP) for Nottingham East at the 1945 general election, and held the seat until its abolition for the 1955 general election. He was then returned for the new Nottingham North constituency, and died in office in May 1959, aged 59. Harrison's election in 1945 necessitated the passing of an Act of Parliament to validate his election, as he held office as a member of a Pensions Appeal Tribunal and was therefore incapable of being elected.

No by-election was called after his death, and the Nottingham North seat remained vacant until Parliament was dissolved on 18 September for the 1959 general election.

Parliament of the United Kingdom
Preceded by Louis Halle Gluckstein	Member of Parliament for Nottingham East; 1945 – 1955	Constituency abolished
New constituency	Member of Parliament for Nottingham North; 1955 – 1959	Succeeded by William Whitlock
