= John Heppell =

Politician from England

Vice-Chamberlain of the Household
- In office 6 May 2005 – 28 June 2007
- Prime Minister: Tony Blair
- Preceded by: Jim Fitzpatrick
- Succeeded by: Liz Blackman

Lord Commissioner of the Treasury
- In office 12 June 2001 – 11 May 2005
- Prime Minister: Tony Blair
- Chancellor: Gordon Brown
- Preceded by: Clive Betts
- Succeeded by: David Watts

Member of Parliament for Nottingham East
- In office 9 April 1992 – 12 April 2010
- Preceded by: Michael Knowles
- Succeeded by: Chris Leslie

Personal details
- Born: 3 November 1948 (age 77) Newcastle upon Tyne, England
- Party: Labour
- Spouse: Eileen Golding

John Heppell (born 3 November 1948) is a former British Labour Party politician who was the Member of Parliament (MP) for Nottingham East from 1992 until he stepped down at the 2010 general election. He was Vice-Chamberlain of the Household from 2005 to 2007.

== Early life ==
Heppell was born in Newcastle upon Tyne, Tyneside and was educated locally at the Rutherford Grammar School (now the Westgate Community School) in Fenham, then the South East Northumberland Technical College (became North Tyneside College and now called Tyne Metropolitan College) in Wallsend, and he completed his education at the Ashington Technical College (now called Northumberland College) on College Road in Ashington. He worked for the National Coal Board from 1964 as a fitter until he left in 1970 to work as a fitter in Nottingham. He joined British Rail in 1975, originally as a diesel fitter, becoming a workshop supervisor in 1978 until he left in 1989.

== Parliamentary career ==
Heppell was elected as a councillor to Nottinghamshire County Council in 1981, serving as the deputy leader for three years from 1989, stepping down from the council in 1993. He was elected to the House of Commons at the 1992 general election for Nottingham East by defeating the sitting Conservative MP Michael Knowles by 7,680 votes and remained the MP there until 2010. He made his maiden speech on 11 May 1992, in which he recalled that it was in his constituency at Sneinton that the founder of the Salvation Army William Booth launched his crusade against poverty in the early 19th century.

In Parliament, Heppell was appointed as the Parliamentary Private Secretary (PPS) to the Leader of the House of Lords Ivor Richard in 1997 and became the PPS to the Deputy Prime Minister John Prescott in 1998. He became a member of the Tony Blair government following the 2001 general election when he was appointed as a Lord Commissioner to the Treasury and Government Whip and was promoted within the Whips Office becoming the Vice-Chamberlain of the Household following the 2005 general election. He held this office until June 2007. He was a member of the selection select committee from 2001.

Heppell has been married to Eileen Golding since 1974 and they have two sons, a daughter and two grandchildren. He used to have knuckle tattoos with the words 'love' and 'hate', but they have since been removed. He is a member of the General, Municipal, Boilermakers and Allied Trade Union having resigned from the National Union of Rail, Maritime and Transport Workers in 2002. He is a keen ornithologist.

On 26 March 2010, Heppell announced that he would stand down at the 2010 general election due to his wife suffering from breast cancer.

Political offices
| Preceded by Jim Fitzpatrick | Vice-Chamberlain of the Household; 2005–2007 | Succeeded by Liz Blackman |
Parliament of the United Kingdom
| Preceded by Michael Knowles | Member of Parliament for Nottingham East; 1992–2010 | Succeeded by Chris Leslie |
