= Lord Henry Cavendish-Bentinck =

British politician

Lord Henry in 1895.

Lord Henry Cavendish-Bentinck (28 May 1863 – 6 October 1931), known as Henry Cavendish-Bentinck until 1880, was a British Conservative politician.

== Biography ==
Cavendish-Bentinck was the eldest son of Lieutenant-General Arthur Cavendish-Bentinck from his second marriage to Augusta Mary Elizabeth, 1st Baroness Bolsover. His paternal grandfather Lord William Charles Augustus Cavendish-Bentinck was the third son of William Cavendish-Bentinck, 3rd Duke of Portland, while William Cavendish-Bentinck, 6th Duke of Portland, was his elder half-brother. In 1880 he was granted the rank of a younger son of a duke on his half-brother's succession to the dukedom.

He entered Parliament for Norfolk North-West in 1886, defeating Joseph Arch, a seat he lost in 1892, when Arch reclaimed the seat. He returned to the House of Commons in 1895 when he was elected for Nottingham South, a seat he held until 1906 and again from 1910 to 1929.

Cavendish-Bentinck was commissioned into the part-time 3rd (2nd Derbyshire Militia) Battalion, Sherwood Foresters, as a lieutenant on 1 July 1881, and later transferred to the Derbyshire Yeomanry, in which he was promoted to captain on 7 April 1897. He served in South Africa during the Second Boer War in 1899–1900, where he was appointed to the Staff on 20 February 1900 as a major. He was promoted to lieutenant-colonel and commanding officer of the Derbyshire Yeomanry on 22 August 1912, and was awarded the Territorial Decoration (TD). He served in World War I, and postwar became honorary colonel of 24th (Derby Yeomanry) Armoured Car Company, Royal Tank Corps. He had been appointed Hon Col of the 4th (Cumberland and Westmorland) Battalion of the Border Regiment on 8 July 1893.

== Family ==
Cavendish-Bentinck married, in 1882, Lady Olivia Caroline Amelia, daughter of Thomas Taylour, Earl of Bective, and granddaughter of the 3rd Marquess of Headfort. She was known as Lady Henry Bentick, and was mentioned in despatches (29 November 1900) by Lord Roberts, Commander-in-Chief, for civilian services during the Second Boer War.

Lord Henry died in October 1931, aged 68. Lady Henry died in November 1939, aged 70.

== Notes ==
Parliament of the United Kingdom
| Preceded by Joseph Arch | Member of Parliament for Norfolk North-West; 1886–1892 | Succeeded by Joseph Arch |
| Preceded by Henry Smith Wright | Member of Parliament for Nottingham South; 1895–1906 | Succeeded by Arthur Richardson |
| Preceded by Arthur Richardson | Member of Parliament for Nottingham South; 1910–1929 | Succeeded by Holford Knight |
Honorary titles
| Preceded by The Lord Hothfield | Lord Lieutenant of Westmorland; 1926–1931 | Succeeded by Stanley Hughes le Fleming |
