= John Williams (Nottinghamshire politician) =

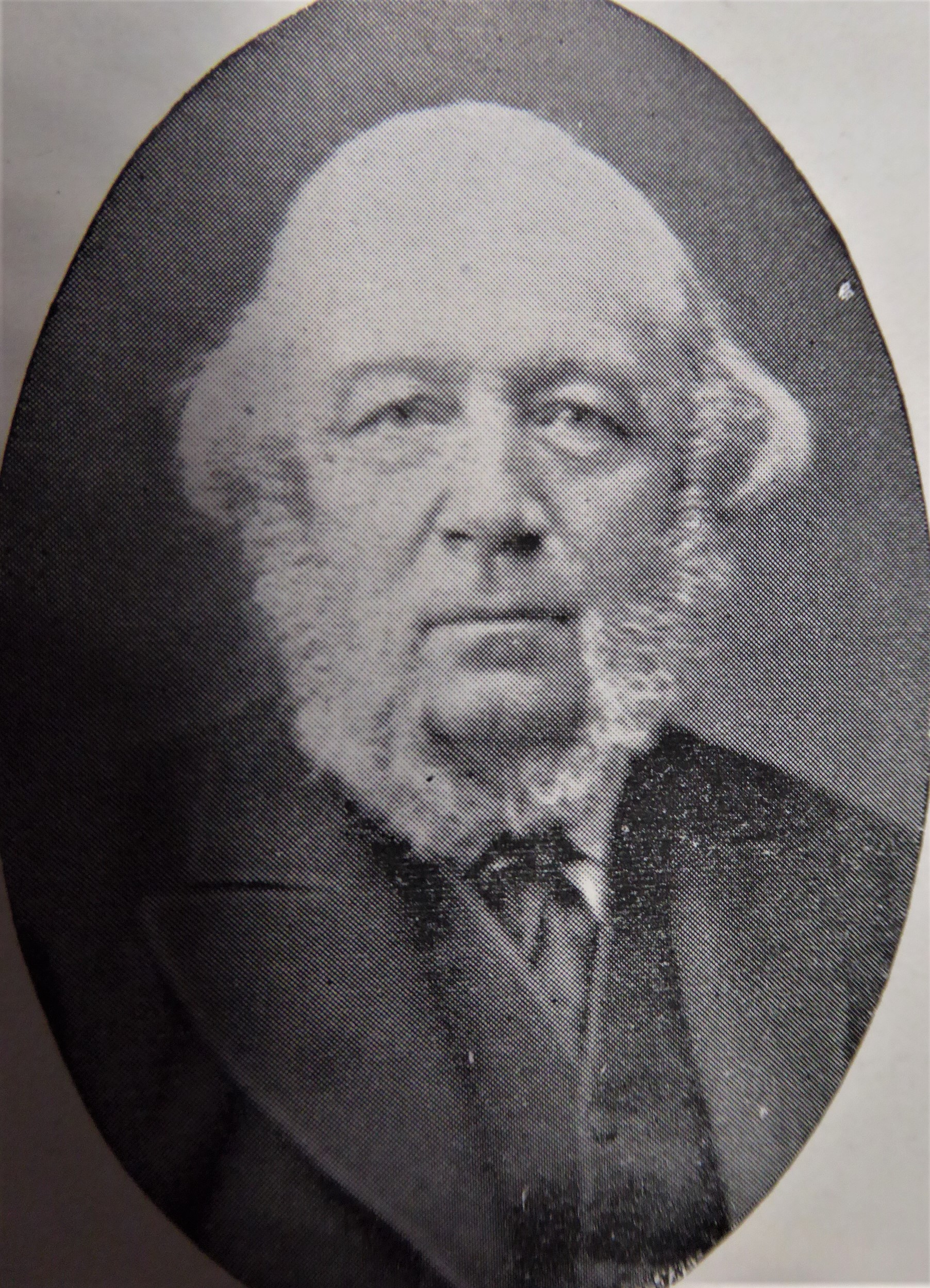
John Carvell Williams

John Carvell Williams (20 September 1821 – 8 October 1907) was an English Nonconformist campaigner and a Liberal Party politician.

Williams was the son of John Allen Williams of Stepney and his wife Mary Carvell, and was educated privately. He was a Nonconformist and campaigned against the privileged status of the Church of England. From 1847 to 1877, he was secretary to the Liberation Society and was Parliamentary chairman to the society. He authored works on disestablishment and other ecclesiastical subjects. He was a Director of Whittlington Life Insurance Company.

In the 1885 general election, Williams was elected as the Member of Parliament (MP) for Nottingham South but lost the seat in the 1886 general election. He was elected MP for Mansfield In the 1892 general election and held the seat until the 1900 general election.

Williams married Anne Goodman, daughter of Ricard Goodman, of Hornsey. She died on 21 December 1902.

Williams lived at Crouch End and died at the age of 86.

== Publications ==
- A Plea for a Free Churchyard 1870
- Religious Liberty in the Churchyard 1876
- The Demand for Freedom in the Church of England
- Disestablishment 1885

Parliament of the United Kingdom
New constituency	Member of Parliament for Nottingham South; 1885 – 1886	Succeeded by Henry Smith Wright
Preceded by Cecil Foljambe	Member of Parliament for Mansfield; 1892 – 1900	Succeeded by Arthur Markham
