= Arthur Hayday =

British politician

Hayday (second from left) as part of a Trades Union Congress delegation to Downing Street in 1925

Arthur Hayday (24 October 1869 in London – 28 February 1956) was an English Labour Party politician.

After learning his chemical trimmer and stoker trade, Hayday became involved in the National Union of General Workers, of which he was an official for many years. He served as President of the Trades Union Congress from 1930 to 1931.

In December 1918, Hayday was elected Member of Parliament (MP) for Nottingham West. Despite a large majority, he lost his seat in a notable loss for Labour in the 1931 general election, and in November, 1935, he regained his seat. He served as Parliamentary Private Secretary to the Lord Privy Seal, John Robert Clynes. Hayday retired from Parliament in 1945. He appeared in the newspapers for his work on numerous occasions.

Hayday died in Nottingham on 28 February 1956.

Parliament of the United Kingdom
Preceded by James Henry Yoxall	Member of Parliament for Nottingham West; 1918–1931	Succeeded by Arthur Cecil Caporn
Preceded by Arthur Cecil Caporn	Member of Parliament for Nottingham West; 1935–1945	Succeeded by Tom O'Brien
Trade union offices
Preceded by Harry Gosling and William Whitefield	Trades Union Congress representative to the American Federation of Labour; 1917; With: John Hill	Succeeded by Margaret Bondfield and Frederick Hall
Preceded by John Beard	President of the Trades Union Congress; 1931	Succeeded by John Bromley
