= Norman Smith (MP for Nottingham South) =

British Labour Party politician (1890–1962)

Henry Norman Smith (31 January 1890 – 21 December 1962) was a British Labour Party politician. He unsuccessfully contested the Faversham constituency in 1931 and 1935, and was elected at the 1945 general election as Member of Parliament (MP) for Nottingham South. He held that seat for ten years, until his defeat at the 1955 election by the Conservative Party candidate Denis Keegan.

An outspoken MP, he was known for not always following the Government brief:

"Mr. Smith has the engaging quality of hitting hard without making personal charges against the integrity and motives of those who think differently. He said many things that made the House gasp, and many that made it laugh..."

With Robert Boothby he was almost alone in condemnation of the Bretton Woods system. He also found Keynesian economics wanting. In his book Politics of Plenty (published 1944) he warned his readers of the dangers of Keynes:

"In due course the Keynes plan for an irresponsible world financial government came to maturity and, by hole and corner methods for which Britain's third Labour Government must share responsibility, was thrust on an unsuspecting world."

He complained that British politics regarded financial policy as being something over and above party strife; to accept the rules of orthodox financial practice as being conventions to which all political parties must defer.

He was a supporter of Social Credit – believing that it could solve the problems of modern banking, highlighted by the 1930s depression. He wrote many articles supporting Social credit.

Parliament of the United Kingdom
Preceded by Frank Markham	Member of Parliament for Nottingham South; 1945–1955	Succeeded by Denis Keegan
