= Nadia Whittome =

British politician (born 1996)

Nadia Whittome MP
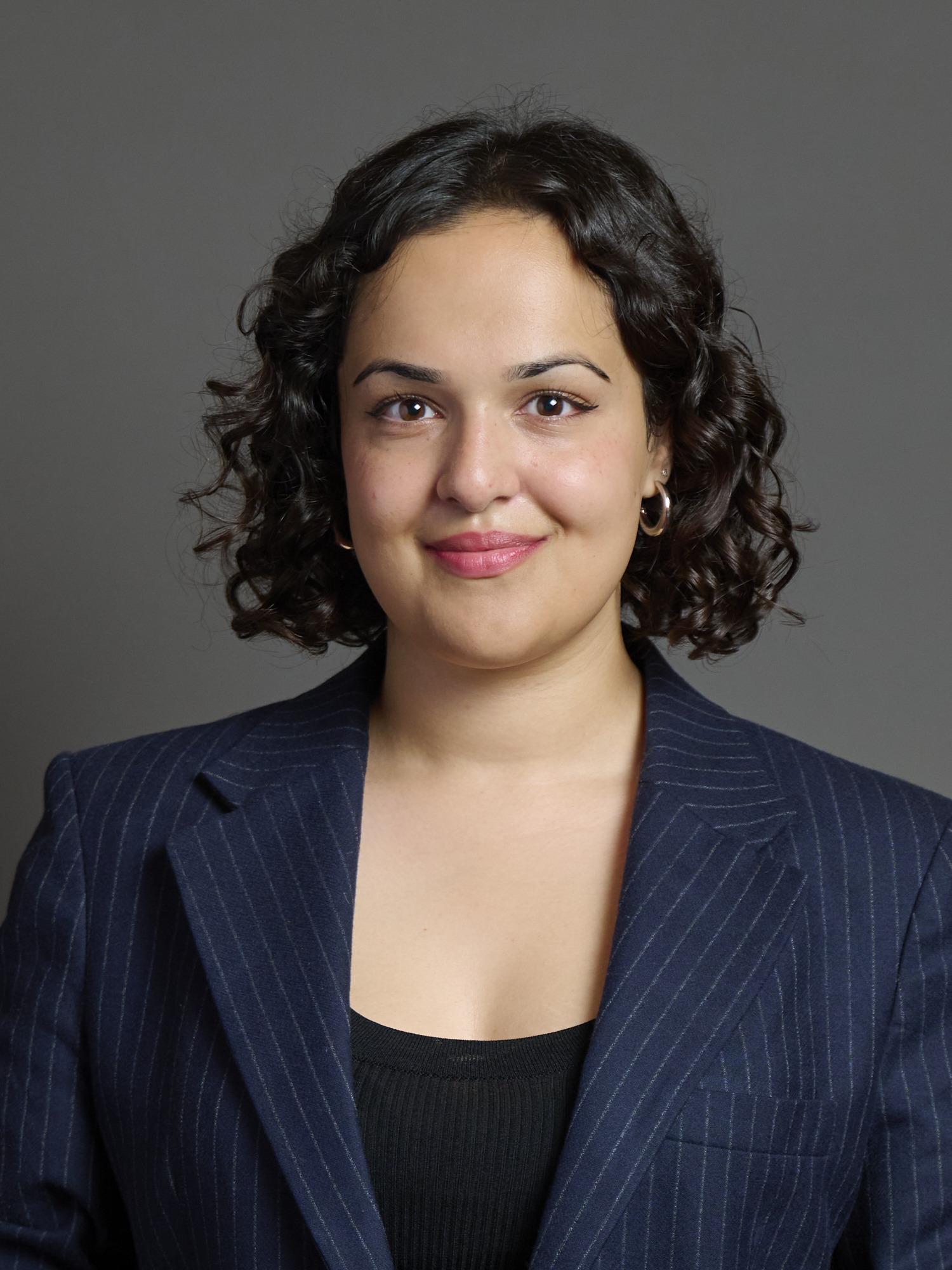
- Official portrait, 2024

Member of Parliament for Nottingham East
- Incumbent
- Assumed office 12 December 2019
- Preceded by: Chris Leslie
- Majority: 15,162 (41.7%)

Personal details
- Born: Nadia Edith Whittome; 29 August 1996 (age 30) Nottingham, England
- Party: Labour
- Other political affiliations: Socialist Campaign Group
- Education: University of Nottingham (dropped out)
- Website: nadiawhittome.org

Nadia Edith Whittome (/ˈwɪtəm/, born 29 August 1996) is a British politician serving as Member of Parliament (MP) for Nottingham East since 2019. A member of the Labour Party, she was previously the youngest MP upon her election at the age of 23. She is a member of the Socialist Campaign Group.

== Early life and career ==
Nadia Whittome was born on 29 August 1996 in Nottingham. Her Punjabi Sikh father migrated to the UK from Banga, India, at the age of 21. He first worked in factories and as a miner before giving immigration advice and running a shop. Her mother is an Anglo-Indian Catholic solicitor and former member of the Labour Party, who left in protest at the amendment of Clause IV of the constitution in 1995.

Whittome grew up in a single-parent household, with a brother. She attended private schools in Nottingham, between the ages of 7 and 11 and later attended West Bridgford School. She also attended Bilborough Sixth Form College, sitting two A-levels and later completed an access course at Nottingham College.

Whittome began study for a law degree at the University of Nottingham but did not complete it. She was later employed as a crime project worker and a carer. She has lived in The Meadows, Top Valley, and West Bridgford areas of Nottingham.

Whittome says she became interested in politics in 2013 due to the effects of the "bedroom tax" and austerity on her local community. She worked in the constituency office of the Member of Parliament (MP) for North West Durham, Pat Glass, Shadow Minister of State for Europe, during the 2016 European Union referendum campaign.

Whittome contested the 2017 Nottinghamshire County Council election as the Labour candidate for the West Bridgford West ward, coming second. Before her election, she was a national committee member of the pro-Remain organisations Another Europe Is Possible and Labour for a Socialist Europe.

== Parliamentary career ==
=== 2019–24 Parliament ===
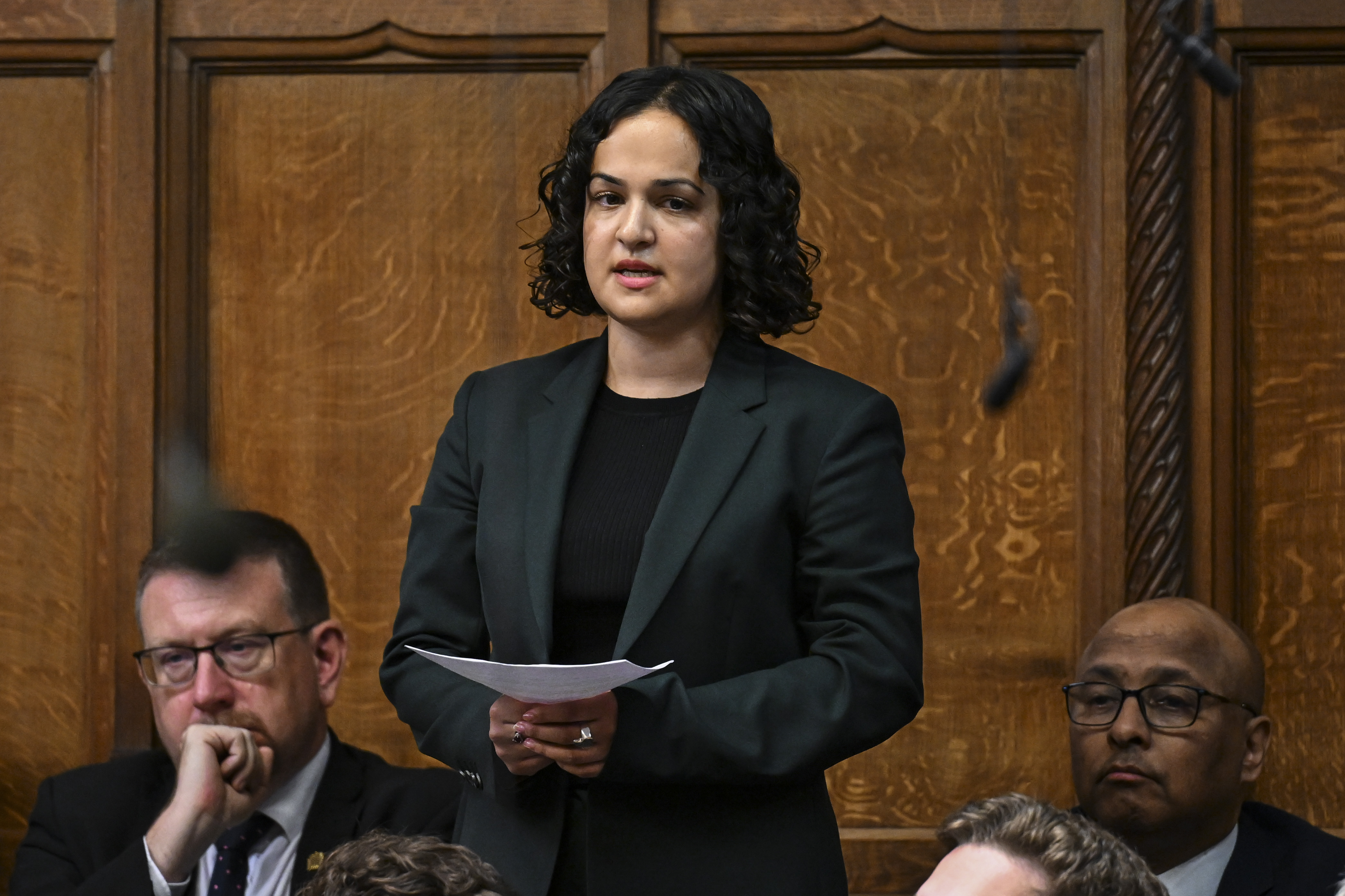
Whittome speaks during a session of Prime Minister's Questions, 2024

Whittome was selected as the Labour candidate for Nottingham East on 28 October 2019. She was elected as the MP for Nottingham East at the 2019 general election with 64.3% of the vote and a majority of 17,393. At the age of 23, she was the youngest MP in the House of Commons, the Baby of the House, until 2023, when Keir Mather was elected. She is also the latest-born MP to have served under the reign of Elizabeth II (the oldest being David Logan, born some 125 years earlier). She identifies ideologically as a democratic socialist.

Following her election, Whittome said that she would keep what she termed "a worker's wage" of £35,000 (after tax), and would donate the remainder of her £79,468 salary as an MP to local charities. Whittome initially supported Clive Lewis in the 2020 Labour leadership election but when Lewis withdrew, she nominated Emily Thornberry. On 28 February 2020, Whittome announced that she would be voting for Rebecca Long-Bailey for leader and Dawn Butler for deputy.

In February 2020, Whittome organised a letter signed by 170 MPs demanding that Jamaican-born offenders not be deported to Jamaica.

During the COVID-19 pandemic, she worked as a part-time carer at a care home. Whittome appeared on Newsnight in April 2020 where she discussed shortages in PPE at her workplace. Shortly after her appearance on the show, she claimed that she had been dismissed from her job as a carer for "spreading misinformation". Her employer ExtraCare denied that there were any shortages in PPE at the care home, and also stated that Whittome had not been dismissed, but that her services were "no longer needed" as their own in-house care team could now meet their needs. In September 2020, ExtraCare issued a statement in which they admitted that there had been shortages of PPE at the care home, and that Whittome had helped to resolve this through public appeals in March and April.

Following election of Keir Starmer as Leader of the Labour Party in April 2020, Whittome was appointed as the parliamentary private secretary to Jonathan Ashworth, the Shadow Secretary of State for Health and Social Care. In response to the toppling of the statue of Edward Colston on 7 June 2020, Whittome tweeted "I celebrate these acts of resistance" and called for "a movement that will tear down systemic racism and the slave owner statues that symbolise it".

In September 2020, Whittome was one of 18 Labour MPs who defied the whip and voted against the Overseas Operations Bill. She said the bill was "anti-veteran, anti-human rights, and would effectively decriminalise torture". In response, she was dismissed from her role as a parliamentary private secretary. In November, she signed an open letter condemning violence and discrimination against transgender people.

Whittome was critical of the Police, Crime, Sentencing and Courts Bill, calling it "the next step in our descent to authoritarianism" and claiming the Bill was "born out of Priti Patel's fury at Black Lives Matter". In May 2021, alongside celebrities and other public figures, she was a signatory to an open letter from Stylist magazine which called on the government to address what it described as an "epidemic of male violence" by funding an "ongoing, high-profile, expert-informed awareness campaign on men's violence against women and girls".

During the 2022 United Kingdom railway strike, she donated £2,000 of her parliamentary salary to the National Union of Rail, Maritime and Transport Workers strike fund, and also joined strikers at Nottingham station. Following the October 2022 Conservative Party leadership election, she tweeted that Rishi Sunak becoming Britain's first British-Asian Prime Minister was not "a win for Asian representation". She later deleted the tweet after being instructed by her party's whips to do so.

=== 2024–present Parliament ===
At the 2024 general election, Whittome was re-elected to Parliament as MP for Nottingham East with a decreased vote share of 53.6% and a decreased majority of 15,162.

Whittome has led calls for Georgia to be removed from the Home Office's list of 'safe' states to return asylum seekers to, saying that it is 'vital that Georgia is now removed from the safe states designation to ensure that the claims of LGBTQIA refugees are properly assessed'.

== Personal life ==
Whittome is queer and bisexual. She speaks fluent French and German. In May 2021, Whittome announced that she had been suffering from post-traumatic stress disorder and would be taking a leave of absence. On 6 September 2021, she returned to her duties in the House of Commons.

Whittome has described herself as a baptised Catholic who does not follow any religion, and has affirmed rather than taking an oath of office. She is a vegan.

Parliament of the United Kingdom
Preceded by Chris Leslie	Member of Parliament for Nottingham East; 2019–present	Incumbent
Honorary titles
Preceded by Mhairi Black	Baby of the House of Commons; 2019–2023	Succeeded by Keir Mather
