= Denis Keegan =

British politician (1924–1993)

Denis Michael Keegan (26 January 1924 – 9 October 1993) was a British barrister and company manager who served a single term as a Conservative Party Member of Parliament. He became known as a moderate politician who opposed capital punishment and restrictions on immigration. He left Parliament to represent small retailers who sold television and radio sets.

== Early life ==
Keegan was the only son of Denis Francis Keegan, a member of the Indian Civil Service born in London (although both father and son would identify themselves as Irish). His mother, born in Newfoundland as Armine Gosling, was a Bermudian (a member of the family famous for the company Gosling Brothers Ltd, Bermuda's best-known wines and spirits importer, distributor and retailer), and he spent most of his childhood in Bermuda.

== Education ==
Keegan was sent to Oundle School in Northamptonshire; When he finished at school, instead of a British university Keegan went to Queen's University at Kingston, Ontario. His permanent residence at the time was Paget, Bermuda. In 1944 he travelled to the UK from Canada to join the Fleet Air Arm as a pilot, with a petty officer rank. He returned to Bermuda and his studies after the war, taking up residence at Stowe Hill, in Paget.

== Legal career ==
After leaving the Fleet Air Arm, Keegan trained in the law and in 1950 was called to the Bar by Gray's Inn. He practised mainly in Nottingham, where he became politically active in the Conservative Party. Keegan was elected as a Conservative to Nottingham City Council in 1953. Keegan's responsibilities on the council included serving on the National Council of Social Service. He also became a member of the Home Office advisory panel on juvenile delinquency.

== 1955 general election ==
For the 1955 general election, Keegan was chosen as Conservative candidate for Nottingham South. This division, which Labour had won with a slender 482 majority in the previous election, had been subject to boundary changes which were thought to make it easier for Labour in the long run as the Clifton housing estate had been added. However Keegan was optimistic, pointing to Conservative successes in municipal elections in which they had been only two votes behind Labour across the division. In fact, Keegan went on to record a surprising victory with a majority of 7,053.

== Capital punishment ==
Keegan made his maiden speech in a debate on capital punishment in March 1956, supporting Sydney Silverman's attempt to abolish hanging. He argued that abolition was not "a lot of sentimental ninnies who did not know what they were doing", but that instead supporters of hanging allowed sentiment to deter them from examining statistics in a proper frame of mind. However, he did want some assurance that with the abolition of hanging, there was no danger to public safety. Keegan was in a minority in the Conservative Party in supporting abolition. Silverman's Bill was passed but rejected by the House of Lords; when the Government then brought in the compromise Homicide Bill restricting the use of capital punishment, Keegan felt he could support it.

== Immigration ==
He remained an active barrister, often appearing for the defence in criminal cases while serving as a Member of Parliament. He specialised in criminal justice issues in Parliament and In May 1957 he took up the case of a life-sentence prisoner who was allowed to attend the funeral of a close relation but chose not to out of fear of the press; Keegan urged Home Secretary R.A. Butler to prevent the press from behaving in this way. Keegan also spoke to oppose restrictions on Commonwealth immigration in principle.

== Television retailers ==
Keegan also became involved in business, and was made Director of the Radio and Television Retailers' Association while serving as an MP. He led a delegation on behalf of the association to call on the Board of Trade to remove restrictions on hire purchase agreements. He found that this job took up an increasing amount of his time, but it was profitable work with the increase in television production during the 1950s. Keegan eventually decided to leave Parliament to concentrate on his business career.

== Colour television ==
After leaving Parliament, Keegan pressed the Government for an early decision on which line standards to adopt for colour television. He criticised Sidney Bernstein of Granada Television for arguing against 625 line colour television because ITA stations were restricted to 405 lines, arguing that Bernstein should instead campaign for an early changeover of ITA programmes to 625 lines so that television did not become obsolete. In 1967 he speculated that constant expansion of the BBC would lead to the corporation applying for permission to run advertising.

== Later life ==
In 1975, Keegan became general manager of the Mercantile Credit Company, a post he held for eight years. He also set up a public relations firm dealing with hire purchase called HP Information. He became chairman of this company in 1984. In later life he returned to the Bar. He suffered from ill health in retirement and died from cancer. He married three times and had two children.

In 2017 his son's wife Gillian Keegan was elected Conservative MP for Chichester.

Parliament of the United Kingdom
Preceded by Norman Smith	Member of Parliament for Nottingham South; 1955 – 1959	Succeeded by William Clark
