= Edward Bond (politician) =

British politician

Bond in 1895.

Edward Bond (October 1844 – 18 August 1920) was a Conservative Party politician in England.

He unsuccessfully contested the 1892 general election in Southwark West, and at the 1895 general election he was elected as member of parliament (MP) for Nottingham East. He was re-elected in 1900, but at the 1906 general election he was defeated by the Liberal Party candidate, Henry John Stedman Cotton.

Parliament of the United Kingdom
Preceded by Arnold Morley	Member of Parliament for Nottingham East; 1895 – 1906	Succeeded by Henry Cotton
