= James Yoxall =

British politician

James Yoxall circa 1895

James Yoxall circa 1910

Sir James Henry Yoxall (15 July 1857 – 2 February 1925) was a British Liberal Party politician and trade unionist. He was the member of parliament (MP) for Nottingham West from 1895 to 1918. He was General Secretary of the National Union of Teachers from 1892 to 1924. He was knighted in 1909.

== Background ==
Yoxall was the eldest son of Henry Houghton Yoxall and Elizabeth Smallwood of Redditch. He was educated at the Wesleyan School, Redditch and Westminster Training College. In 1886, he married Elizabeth Coles. The couple had one son, Harry Yoxall, and two daughters.

== Professional career ==
Yoxall qualified as a certificated teacher at Westminster Training College in 1878. He was president of the National Union of Teachers in 1891 before taking over as general secretary. He served as Royal Commissioner on Secondary Education from 1894 to 1895. He was also the editor of The Schoolmaster from 1909 to 1924, and was a member of the Committee on Modern Language Teaching from 1916 to 1918. He was awarded an honorary MA by the University of Cambridge in 1899 and an honorary MA by Oxford in 1907. He was also an Officier d'Académie, France.

== Political career ==
Yoxall was Liberal candidate for the Bassetlaw Division of Nottinghamshire at the 1892 General Election. He was Liberal candidate for the Nottingham West at the 1895 General Election, when he gained the seat from the Unionists. He was returned at a further four general elections. In 1918 he retired from parliament just before the general election. He served as a justice of the peace.

== Author ==
Yoxall wrote The Doings of Dick and Dan: A book for Boys and Tomboys, published by S. W. Partridge & Co. Ltd, in 1911.

Parliament of the United Kingdom
Preceded by Sir Charles Seely	Member of Parliament for Nottingham West; 1895–1918	Succeeded by Arthur Hayday
Trade union offices
Preceded by G. Collins	President of the National Union of Teachers; 1892	Succeeded by Charles Bowden
Preceded by Thomas Heller	General Secretary of the National Union of Teachers; 1892–1924	Succeeded by Frank Walter Goldstone
