= Nottingham West (UK Parliament constituency) =

Parliamentary constituency in the United Kingdom, 1955–1983

- Former borough constituency for the House of Commons

1955–1983
- Seats: one
- Created from: Nottingham Central and Nottingham North West
- Replaced by: Nottingham South and Nottingham North

1885–1950
- Seats: one

Nottingham West was a borough constituency in the city of Nottingham. It returned one Member of Parliament (MP) to the House of Commons of the Parliament of the United Kingdom.

The constituency was created for the 1885 general election, and abolished for the 1950 general election. However, a new Nottingham West constituency was created for the 1955 general election, and was in turn abolished for the 1983 general election.

== Boundaries ==
1885–1918: The Borough of Nottingham wards of Broxtowe, Forest, St Albans, Sherwood, and Wollaton.

1918–1955: The County Borough of Nottingham wards of Broxtowe, St Albans, and Wollaton.

The constituency was renamed Nottingham North West from 1950 to 1955, but its boundaries remained unchanged.

1955–1974: The County Borough of Nottingham wards of Abbey, Broxtowe, Robin Hood, and Wollaton.

1974–1983: The County Borough of Nottingham wards of Abbey, Broxtowe, Clifton, Robin Hood, University, and Wollaton.

== Members of Parliament ==
=== MPs 1885-1950 ===
Year	Member	Party
1885	Charles Seely	Liberal
1886	Henry Broadhurst	Liberal
1892	Charles Seely	Liberal Unionist
1895	James Yoxall	Liberal
1918	Arthur Hayday	Labour
1931	Arthur Caporn	Conservative
1935	Arthur Hayday	Labour
1945	Tom O'Brien	Labour
1950	constituency abolished	

=== MPs 1955-1983 ===
Election	Member	Party
1955	constituency re-established	
1955	Tom O'Brien	Labour
1959	Peter Tapsell	Conservative
1964	Michael English	Labour
1983	constituency abolished	

== Elections ==
=== Elections in the 1880s ===
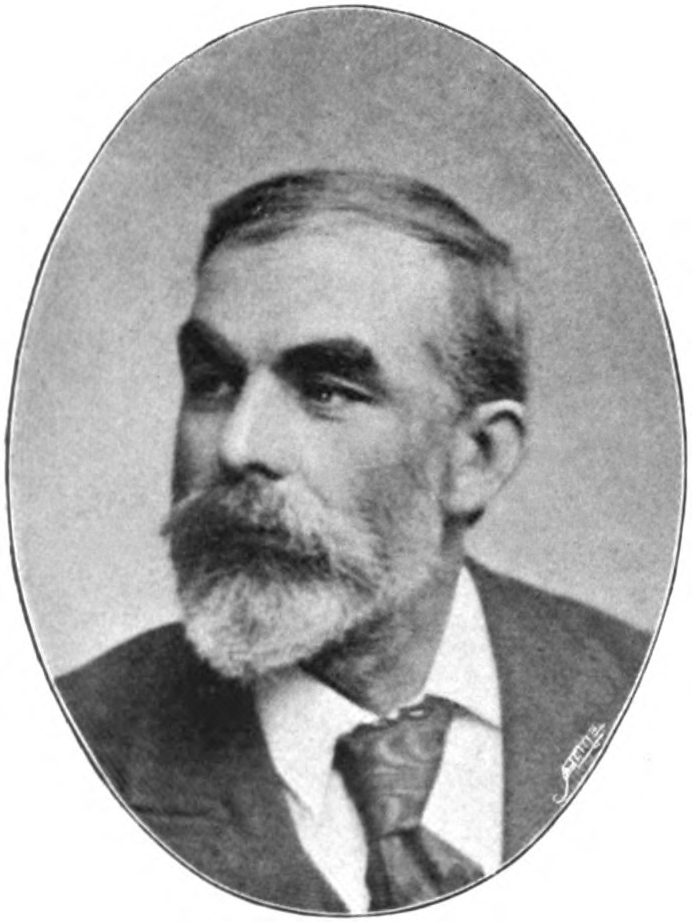
John Burns

General election 1885: Nottingham West
Party	Candidate	Votes	%	±%
Liberal	Charles Seely	6,669	60.3	
Conservative	Edward Cope	3,797	34.3	
Social Democratic Federation	John Burns	598	5.4	
Majority		2,872	26.0	
Turnout		11,064	74.1	
Registered electors		14,929		
Liberal win (new seat)				

Henry Broadhurst

General election 1886: Nottingham West
Party	Candidate	Votes	%	±%
Lib-Lab	Henry Broadhurst	5,458	54.2	−6.1
Liberal Unionist	Charles Seely	4,609	45.8	+11.5
Majority		849	8.4	−17.6
Turnout		10,067	67.4	−6.7
Registered electors		14,929		
Lib-Lab hold		Swing	−8.8	

=== Elections in the 1890s ===
General election 1892: Nottingham West
Party	Candidate	Votes	%	±%
Liberal Unionist	Charles Seely	5,610	51.4	+5.6
Lib-Lab	Henry Broadhurst	5,309	48.6	−5.6
Majority		301	2.8	N/A
Turnout		10,919	81.4	+14.0
Registered electors		13,411		
Liberal Unionist gain from Lib-Lab		Swing	+5.6	

James Yoxall

General election 1895: Nottingham West
Party	Candidate	Votes	%	±%
Liberal	James Yoxall	6,088	52.2	+3.6
Liberal Unionist	Arthur Goldsmith Sparrow	5,575	47.8	−3.6
Majority		513	4.4	N/A
Turnout		11,663	80.4	−1.0
Registered electors		14,510		
Liberal gain from Liberal Unionist		Swing	+3.6	

=== Elections in the 1900s ===
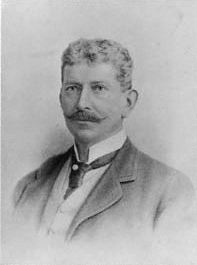
Sir Lepel Griffin

General election 1900: Nottingham West
Party	Candidate	Votes	%	±%
Liberal	James Yoxall	6,023	51.6	−0.6
Liberal Unionist	Lepel Griffin	5,639	48.4	+0.6
Majority		384	3.2	−1.2
Turnout		11,662	78.4	−2.0
Registered electors		14,873		
Liberal hold		Swing	−0.6	

General election 1906: Nottingham West
Party	Candidate	Votes	%	±%
Liberal	James Yoxall	8,107	60.6	+9.0
Liberal Unionist	William Laurence Pemberton Rowley	5,262	39.4	−9.0
Majority		2,845	21.2	+18.0
Turnout		13,369	81.0	+2.6
Registered electors		16,506		
Liberal hold		Swing	+9.0	

=== Elections in the 1910s ===
Sir James Yoxall

General election January 1910: Nottingham West
Party	Candidate	Votes	%	±%
Liberal	James Yoxall	8,955	57.4	−3.2
Liberal Unionist	Henry Lygon	6,652	42.6	+3.2
Majority		2,303	14.8	−6.4
Turnout		15,607	89.3	+8.3
Registered electors		17,476		
Liberal hold		Swing	−3.2	

General election December 1910: Nottingham West
Party	Candidate	Votes	%	±%
Liberal	James Yoxall	8,141	57.8	+0.4
Conservative	Bernard Swanwick Wright	5,949	42.2	−0.4
Majority		2,192	15.6	+0.8
Turnout		14,090	80.6	−8.7
Registered electors		17,476		
Liberal hold		Swing	+0.4	

General election 1918: Nottingham West
Party	Candidate	Votes	%	±%
Labour	Arthur Hayday	7,286	56.8	New
Liberal	Arthur Richardson	5,552	43.2	−14.6
Majority		1,734	13.6	N/A
Turnout		12,838	42.6	−38.0
Registered electors		30,105		
Labour gain from Liberal		Swing		

=== Elections in the 1920s ===
General election 1922: Nottingham West
Party	Candidate	Votes	%	±%
Labour	Arthur Hayday	10,787	49.0	−7.8
Unionist	George Herbert Powell	6,050	27.5	New
Liberal	Alec Lionel Rea	5,163	23.4	−19.8
Majority		4,737	21.5	+7.9
Turnout		22,000	72.5	+29.9
Registered electors		30,332		
Labour hold		Swing	+6.0	

General election 1923: Nottingham West
Party	Candidate	Votes	%	±%
Labour	Arthur Hayday	12,366	62.7	+13.7
Unionist	James Langham Litchfield	7,370	37.3	+9.8
Majority		4,996	25.4	+3.9
Turnout		19,736	63.5	−9.0
Registered electors		31,093		
Labour hold		Swing	+2.0	

General election 1924: Nottingham West
Party	Candidate	Votes	%	±%
Labour	Arthur Hayday	12,782	56.6	−6.1
Constitutionalist	Charles Loseby	9,790	43.4	+6.1
Majority		2,992	13.2	−12.2
Turnout		22,572	71.5	+8.0
Registered electors		31,574		
Labour hold		Swing	−6.1	

General election 1929: Nottingham West
Party	Candidate	Votes	%	±%
Labour	Arthur Hayday	18,593	55.1	−1.5
Liberal	Walter Edward Barron	8,276	24.5	New
Unionist	Charles Loseby	6,893	20.4	−23.0
Majority		10,317	30.6	+17.4
Turnout		33,762	79.8	+8.3
Registered electors		42,314		
Labour hold		Swing	+10.8	

=== Elections in the 1930s ===
General election 1931: Nottingham West
Party	Candidate	Votes	%	±%
Conservative	Arthur Caporn	20,596	57.9	+37.5
Labour	Arthur Hayday	14,963	42.1	−13.0
Majority		5,633	15.8	−14.8
Turnout		35,559	76.4	−3.4
Conservative gain from Labour		Swing		

General election 1935: Nottingham West
Party	Candidate	Votes	%	±%
Labour	Arthur Hayday	19,697	53.7	+11.6
Conservative	Arthur Caporn	16,987	46.3	−11.6
Majority		2,710	7.4	N/A
Turnout		36,684	71.4	−5.0
Labour gain from Conservative		Swing		

=== Elections in the 1940s ===
General election 1945: Nottingham West
Party	Candidate	Votes	%	±%
Labour	Tom O'Brien	24,887	59.6	+5.9
Conservative	Bernard Stephen Townroe	9,711	23.2	−23.1
Liberal	Samuel Arthur John Young	7,184	17.2	New
Majority		15,176	36.4	+29.0
Turnout		41,782	76.3	+4.9
Labour hold		Swing		

=== Elections in the 1950s ===
General election 1955: Nottingham West
Party	Candidate	Votes	%	±%
Labour	Tom O'Brien	25,539	54.14	
Conservative	Francis Michael Richardson	21,631	45.86	
Majority		3,908	8.28	
Turnout		47,170	76.12	
Registered electors		61,969		
Labour win (new seat)				

General election 1959: Nottingham West
Party	Candidate	Votes	%	±%
Conservative	Peter Tapsell	22,052	50.19	+4.33
Labour	Tom O'Brien	21,888	49.81	−4.33
Majority		164	0.38	N/A
Turnout		43,940	70.84	−5.28
Registered electors		62,030		
Conservative gain from Labour		Swing	+4.33	

=== Elections in the 1960s ===
General election 1964: Nottingham West
Party	Candidate	Votes	%	±%
Labour	Michael English	23,035	52.59	+2.78
Conservative	Peter Tapsell	20,763	47.41	−2.78
Majority		2,272	5.18	N/A
Turnout		43,798	81.80	+10.96
Registered electors		53,542		
Labour gain from Conservative		Swing	+2.78	

General election 1966: Nottingham West
Party	Candidate	Votes	%	±%
Labour	Michael English	23,859	57.95	+5.36
Conservative	David J Penfold	17,311	42.05	−5.36
Majority		6,548	15.90	+10.72
Turnout		41,170	78.33	−3.47
Registered electors		52,561		
Labour hold		Swing	+5.36	

=== Elections in the 1970s ===
General election 1970: Nottingham West
Party	Candidate	Votes	%	±%
Labour	Michael English	21,255	52.80	−5.15
Conservative	Martin W Suthers	19,003	47.20	+5.15
Majority		2,252	5.60	−10.30
Turnout		40,258	70.92	
Labour hold		Swing		

General election February 1974: Nottingham West
Party	Candidate	Votes	%	±%
Labour	Michael English	27,592	45.50	−7.30
Conservative	Peter Lloyd	21,795	35.94	−11.26
Liberal	Andrew Marshall Johnson	11,260	18.57	New
Majority		5,797	9.56	+3.96
Turnout		60,647	78.84	+7.92
Labour hold		Swing		

General election October 1974: Nottingham West
Party	Candidate	Votes	%	±%
Labour	Michael English	27,373	49.70	+4.20
Conservative	Peter Lloyd	18,108	32.88	−3.06
Liberal	Andrew Marshall Johnson	9,598	17.43	−1.14
Majority		9,265	16.82	+7.26
Turnout		55,079	70.93	−7.91
Labour hold		Swing	+3.63	

General election 1979: Nottingham West
Party	Candidate	Votes	%	±%
Labour	Michael English	26,301	46.54	−3.15
Conservative	Margaret Ethel Stoneman	23,801	42.12	+9.24
Liberal	Michael John Willis	5,497	9.73	−7.70
National Front	Terence John Wilkinson	718	1.27	New
Workers Revolutionary	Arthur Ufton James	192	0.34	New
Majority		2,500	4.42	−12.40
Turnout		56,509	73.24	+2.31
Labour hold		Swing	−6.20	
