= Shipley by-election =

Shipley by-election may refer to three elections in Shipley, West Yorkshire, England:

- 1910 Shipley by-election
- 1915 Shipley by-election
- 1930 Shipley by-election
