= Philip Davies =

British politician (born 1972)

Sir Philip Davies
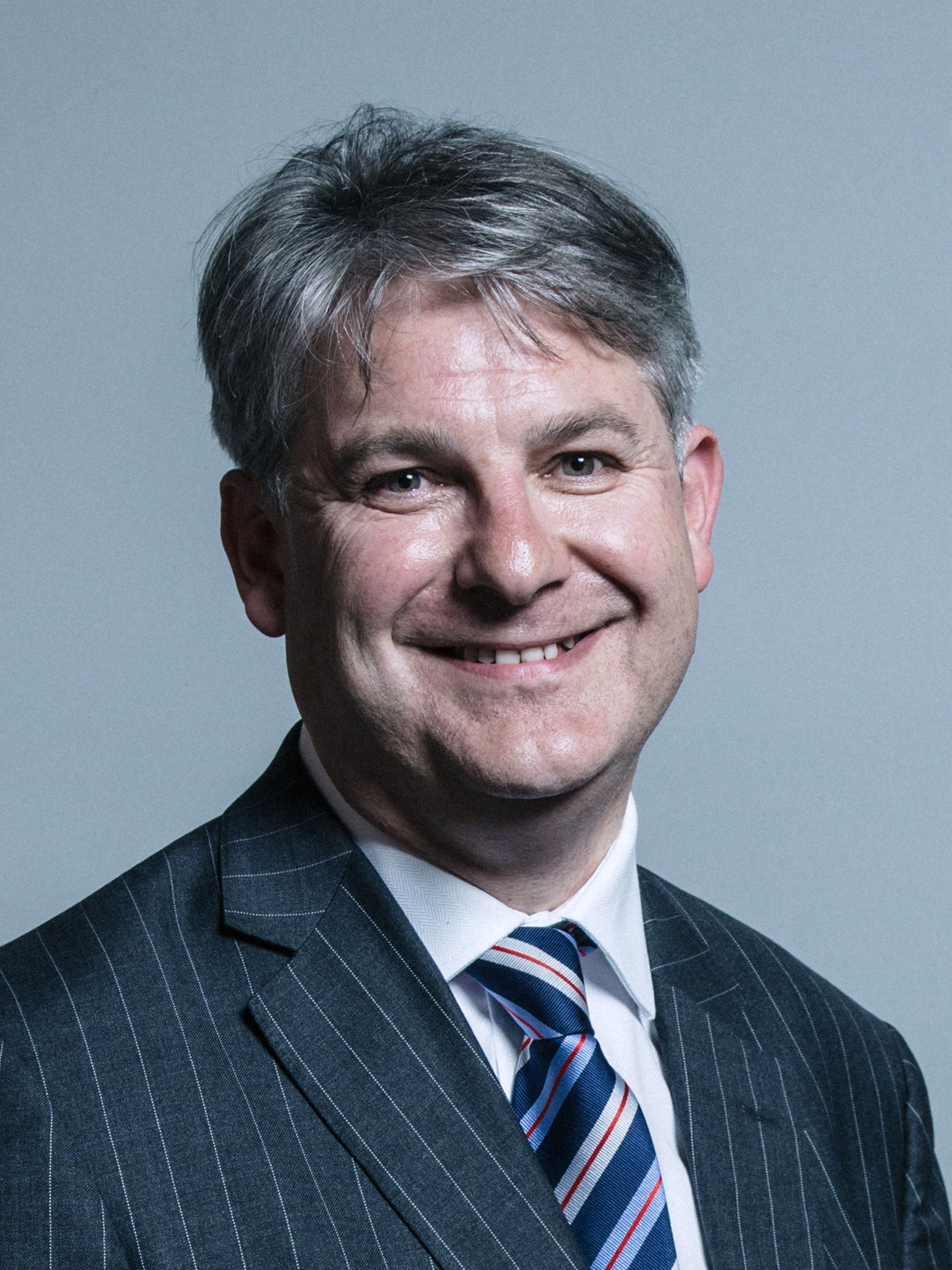
- Official portrait, 2017

Member of Parliament for Shipley
- In office 5 May 2005 – 30 May 2024
- Preceded by: Chris Leslie
- Succeeded by: Anna Dixon

Personal details
- Born: Philip Andrew Davies; 5 January 1972 (age 54) Doncaster, West Riding of Yorkshire, England
- Party: Conservative
- Spouses: Deborah Helmsley (m. 1994; div. 2012) Esther McVey (m. 2020)
- Children: 2
- Parent: Peter Davies (father)
- Education: University of Huddersfield
- Website: www.philip-davies.org.uk

Sir Philip Andrew Davies (born 5 January 1972) is a British politician who served as the Member of Parliament (MP) for Shipley in West Yorkshire from 2005 to 2024. He is a member of the Conservative Party.

Davies voted against the Conservative Party whip over 250 times in the course of his parliamentary career. He was criticised for filibustering parliamentary bills not supported by the government and "killing off legislation he doesn't like".

Davies has been an advocate for the abolition of tuition fees and is a campaigner for the men's rights movement and is known for campaigns against political correctness and feminism. He played a lead role in securing the first International Men's Day debate in Parliament in 2015, which now takes place annually.

He is also an organiser for the TaxPayers' Alliance. Davies has regularly been criticised by other politicians and prominent public figures for comments he has made on gender equality and women, homosexuality, ethnic minorities, as well as people with disabilities. He has stated that people with disabilities should have the option of working for less than the minimum wage. Davies has said that white, male ministers risk being "hoofed out" of the government to make way for women or minority ethnic MPs.

== Early life and education ==
Davies was born in Doncaster; his father is Peter Davies, a former elected Mayor of Doncaster. He was educated at the state-sector boarding school, Old Swinford Hospital School in Stourbridge, before studying at Huddersfield Polytechnic (which became Huddersfield University in his third year), where he was awarded a 2:1 BA Hons degree in history and political studies in 1993. Originally he wanted to be a journalist, but in a January 2017 Spectator interview he said, "It was my ambition in life but I just realised I was too shy. You've got to have a confidence that I think I probably never had".

Following his graduation, Davies worked at supermarket business Asda from September 1993 to May 2005, first as a customer services manager and later as a marketing manager. He has also worked at Marilyn Davies Bookmakers and Mark Jarvis Bookmakers.

== Parliamentary career ==
At the 2001 general election, Davies unsuccessfully contested Colne Valley as the Conservative candidate, where he came second with 30.5% of the vote behind the incumbent Labour MP Kali Mountford.

At the 2005 general election Davies was elected as MP for Shipley, winning the seat with 39% of the vote and a majority of 422. He received donations toward his successful campaign from Bearwood Corporate Services, a company set up by non-domicile Lord Ashcroft to give out donations to marginal seats such as Davies'.

Davies made his maiden speech on 7 June 2005. He recalled Titus Salt and then mentioned the UNESCO World Heritage Site in Saltaire. He also announced that he wanted to remain a backbencher and not to be a shadow spokesman or a minister, and that he wanted to feel able to speak for his constituents.

At the 2010 general election, Davies was re-elected as MP for Shipley with an increased vote share of 48.6% and an increased majority of 9,944. He was re-elected onto the executive committee of the 1922 Committee of backbench Conservative MPs after the general election and became a member of the Culture, Media and Sport Select Committee. He also became a member of the newly established backbench business committee and a member of the Speaker's Panel, chairing Westminster Hall debates.

In November 2012, Davies wrote to the Metropolitan Police requesting it to open a second investigation into ex-Labour MP Denis MacShane's expenses claims.

At the 2015 general election, Davies was again re-elected, with an increased vote share of 50% and a decreased majority of 9,624. He was again re-elected at the snap 2017 general election, with an increased vote share of 51.3% and a decreased majority of 4,681 votes. At the 2019 general election, Davies was again re-elected, with a decreased vote share of 50.8% and an increased majority of 6.242 votes.

In 2020, Davies became one of four Vice-Chairs of the All Party Parliamentary Group on Whistleblowing. This group has been subject to criticism by some campaigners on whistleblowing law reform.

Davies is rated as one of the Conservatives' most rebellious MPs.

Davies was defeated in the 2024 general election losing to Labour candidate Anna Dixon.

=== Filibustering ===
Davies has been repeatedly criticised for his use of the filibuster to block legislation, particularly when private members' bills under the Ten Minute Rule are debated. This happens on Fridays, when attendance is often poor because MPs have returned to their home constituencies, leaving these debates particularly susceptible to filibustering. The practice can be stopped if 100 MPs attend Parliament, and Davies has noted that if "not even 100 MPs out of 650 showed up" then it indicated a bill "did not have full support".

When asked by a journalist whether his tactics were underhand, Davies said:

"When I first got elected to Parliament my mentor was Eric Forth [the former Tory MP] and he really was the past master of talking out bills on a Friday. He did it for fun and he was brilliant at it. After he died I vowed I would do the same kind of work. He taught me that lots of these have all got a worthy sentiment behind them but you can't pass legislation on the whim of a worthy sentiment because it affects people's lives and livelihoods. I agree with him. It is a very unsatisfactory way to pass legislation".

In October 2015, Davies spoke for 93 minutes, thereby successfully blocking a proposed bill that would have given free hospital parking to carers. He had pledged his support for carers four months earlier.

In November 2015, Davies gave the longest speech in a sequence by Conservative MPs that resulted in 'talking out' a bill backed by St. John Ambulance, the British Red Cross, and the British Heart Foundation to provide first-aid training to children. Davies argued that "schools can already teach first aid if they want to. They should make the decision rather than have it forced on them by Whitehall."

=== Gambling industry ===
In February 2013, Davies was investigated by the Parliamentary Commissioner for Standards following a complaint claiming he received more than £10,000 in benefits from companies with links to the gambling industry which he did not fully declare in the register of members' interests during a year-long investigation into the betting industry. The commissioner required Davies to apologise for breaching the parliamentary code after not declaring an interest in a debate and at the Culture, Media and Sport Committee, namely £870 of hospitality from the bookmaker Ladbrokes, rather than the larger amount complained about. Davies told Parliament the omission was not "due to a desire to conceal it ... but to an oversight" and he was "very grateful to [the rest of the committee] for accepting that mine had been a genuine error".

In December 2016, Davies was cleared of wrongdoing over claims alleging "extremely favourable" treatment he had received from Ladbrokes – the lifting of restrictions on his betting account. The investigation was dropped on the basis of "insufficient evidence" that Davies had broken the rules and the complainant had refused to drop his anonymity out of a fear of losing his job. Davies defended hospitality and his meetings with the racing industry, stating: "I am the elected chairman of the All Party Parliamentary Group for Betting and Gaming – and a former bookmaker – so of course I meet with bookmakers. It would be rather extraordinary if I didn't".

In November 2018, Tracey Crouch resigned as sports minister since she believed Philip Davies successfully went above her and secured a delay to curbs on fixed odds betting terminals. Davies received hospitality worth £3,204.44 from betting companies and bookmakers including Ladbrokes, William Hill and SkyBet in the year to 2018. In 2020, Davies received total payments of £49,800 from GVC Holdings for providing advice to the global betting company. In June 2021, Davies received hospitality worth £3,687.60, and his wife Esther McVey received £2,287.60, from companies linked to the betting industry.

From June 2021 through to March 2022, Davies received a variety of hospitality gifts from the gambling and horse racing industry worth £11,830.60. Additionally, he received a lifetime free entry badge from Arena Racing Company allowing him free entry to any of their 16 racecourses; the estimated value of this is £1000 per year.

In February 2023, having been entertained at Les Ambassadeurs luxury casino in Mayfair, central London, Davies wrote to the culture secretary Lucy Frazer, urging her to introduce a measure that was subsequently included in the UK Government's 'Gambling Act Review White Paper'.

=== Election betting ===
In 2024, during the General Election campaign, Davies placed a bet of £8,000 against himself to lose his seat and subsequently became embroiled in the 2024 United Kingdom general election betting scandal. Davies also placed a bet on his wife, Esther McVey, winning and retaining her current seat in Tatton. When asked about the bets, Davies told the Sun newspaper, "What's it got to do with you whether I did or didn't? It's nobody's business."

=== Political views ===
Davies is on the governing council of The Freedom Association pressure group, and is an organiser for the TaxPayers' Alliance. He has called for government to "scrap the Human Rights Act for foreign nationals and chuck them out of the country" and in 2016, expressed admiration for Donald Trump. Davies was criticised by a Liberal Democrat councillor as being "disgracefully reactionary" for his public comment in 2011 that he wanted to see "an increase in the prison population". Davies believes that prison works and that it reduces the UK crime rate.

In 2009, Davies called for the scrapping of the minimum wage in the UK. In 2014, he called for the abolition of Sunday trading laws.

==== European Union ====
Davies advocated British withdrawal from the European Union, starting the Better Off Out campaign, and campaigning at the Conservative Party Conference in 2005.

The Eurosceptic UK Independence Party (UKIP) did not field a candidate against Davies at the 2010 general election and campaigned for his re-election after being identified as a "committed eurosceptic". In the event, Davies held his seat with an increased majority of just under 10,000 votes.

==== Race and ethnic minorities ====
Davies was the parliamentary spokesman for the inactive Campaign Against Political Correctness and was accused of wasting the Equality and Human Rights Commission's time by sending a stream of correspondence to its chair, Trevor Phillips, between 2008 and 2009. In this correspondence, he asked questions relating to race and sex discrimination such as: "Is it offensive to black up or not, particularly if you are impersonating a black person?" and "Why it is so offensive to black up your face, as I have never understood this?" Some commentators suggested that he was advocating 'blacking up'.

Davies also asked whether it was racist for a policeman to refer to a BMW as "black man's wheels" and whether the Metropolitan Black Police Association breaches discrimination law by restricting its membership to black people. Peter Herbert, the chair of the Society of Black Lawyers, said: "This correspondence seems a complete and utter waste of time... he shouldn't be using the Human Rights Commission as basically a source of legal advice".

A complaint from Davies was sent to the Equality and Human Rights Commission in January 2017 that the Jhalak Prize, a literary prize intended to increase the diversity of published authors, was discriminatory towards white writers. After investigating the issue, the EHRC rejected Davies' complaint the following April. A spokesman for the EHRC said the body had decided the prize did not break the Equality Act 2010. "This award is the type of action which the Commission supports and recommends", he said. Davies rejected "positive discrimination" and said he believed in "true equality".

In May 2018, Davies said that police stop and search numbers had reduced dramatically as a result of "politically correct chatter". He said that black people are "more likely to be murderers". Davies said the evidence showed the community much more likely to be stopped and searched and yet found to have done nothing wrong were white people.

Following an interim report on the connections between colonialism and properties now in the care of the National Trust, including links with historic slavery, Davies was among the signatories of a letter to The Telegraph in November 2020 from the "Common Sense Group" of Conservative Parliamentarians. The letter accused the National Trust of being "coloured by cultural Marxist dogma, colloquially known as the 'woke agenda'".

==== Gender and sexuality issues ====
In March 2007, he voted against the Equality Act (Sexual Orientation) Regulations 2007 which proposed to allow the Secretary of State to make regulations defining discrimination and harassment on grounds of sexual orientation, create criminal offences, and provide for exceptions. He also complained, while calling for a Parliamentary debate on "political correctness", about a school production of Romeo and Julian during LGBT History month. Commons Leader Harriet Harman described his remarks as "cheap shots".

He was called a "troglodyte" in 2009 by the Conservative MP John Bercow for his opposition to debating the Equality Bill, the effect of the recession on women and International Women's Day.

In 2013, Davies voted against same-sex marriage because the bill did not allow for opposite-sex civil partnerships. In an interview with the BBC Two programme Daily Politics, Davies stated his reasoning for voting against it was "You can have civil partnerships and marriage for gay people. You can only have marriage for heterosexuals. It's not equality."

Speaking in Parliament in October 2014, Davies said he believes parents and not schools should take responsibility for the sex education of children. Believing his constituents associate increased sex education with an increase in teenage pregnancies, he thought they would welcome its abandonment.

On 27 October 2015, he presented the case to the Backbench Business Committee for a parliamentary debate in observance of International Men's Day, raising issues such as "men's shorter life expectancy, wider men's health issues [...], the high suicide rate amongst men, the propensity of violence against men [...], the underachievement of boys in education compared to girls" and fathers' custodial rights. This led to a public disagreement with Labour MP Jess Phillips who laughed at his proposal. "As the only woman on this committee, it seems like every day to me is International Men’s Day", Phillips said in response to Davies during the meeting.

The committee originally rejected his case, but a debate in Westminster Hall on 19 November was eventually granted after Labour and Conservative colleagues gave their support. Davies said during the debate: "The problem is virtually everything we do in this House and debate in this House seems to start with the premise that everything is biased against women and something must be done about it – never an appreciation that men’s issues can be just as important and that men can be just as badly treated in certain areas as women". Maria Miller, Conservative chair of the Women and Equalities Select Committee responded to Davies: "Women face discrimination on a daily basis, that’s not a myth. My honourable friend does not do his case much good at all when he tries to belittle that". "One of the most depressing things to happen recently was the introduction of the Select Committee on Women and Equalities", he said during the debate; the select committee had been created earlier in the year.

In July 2016, Davies gave a speech on the justice gender gap at the International Conference of Men's Issues organised by Justice for Men and Boys. He said: "I don’t believe there’s an issue between men and women. The problem is being stirred up by those who can be described as militant feminists and the politically correct males who pander to this nonsense". Objecting to the lower number of men who win in custody cases with their former partners, he said: "Many women use their children as a stick to beat the father with". He rejected a suggestion that his appearance at a J4MB event meant that he subscribed to the party's viewpoint. He did not receive a fee for his participation in the event.

In response to Davies' comments at the July 2016 event, Jeremy Corbyn, the leader of the opposition, said that Davies' "deeply sexist" opinions showed that he had an "utter contempt for women". He called on Theresa May, the Conservative leader, to withdraw the party whip from Davies. The Labour peer Baroness Corston, a barrister who reviewed the issue of women in the justice system for the Home Office, told The Guardian that "There is indisputable evidence that women are treated by the courts more harshly" than men. Davies responded by providing figures from the Ministry of Justice collected by men's-rights lobby group Parity, which he argued suggest that the courts favour women when sentencing. He said that Corston is thus "ill-informed or deliberately lying when she accuses me of lying".

An International Men's Day debate, instigated by Davies, took place for the first time in the House of Commons on 17 November 2016. Davies rejected claims that it is a stunt and hoped it would become an annual event. In an article for The Times published on the same day, Davies wrote: "The aims of International Men’s Day are laudable. They include promoting male role models, celebrating the contribution men make, focusing on men’s health and wellbeing as well as highlighting discrimination against men".

Davies was elected, unopposed, to the women and equalities select committee in December 2016. "Philip Davies doesn't even think that the Women’s and Equalities Committee should exist, yet he's about to join it", commented the Green Party MP Caroline Lucas, "perhaps giving him a chance to rethink his views".

A few days later in December 2016, Davies talked for 78 minutes in an unsuccessful attempt to derail a Bill designed to bring Britain in line with the Istanbul Convention whose purported aim is to protect women against violence. He argued that the Bill was "sexist against men" because of its focus and ignored other victims which if recognised equally would have been "true equality". Thangam Debbonaire, speaking after him, had to cut her own speech short in order to make sure his filibustering did not succeed. The bill was, however, passed by 135 to 2. At the bill's third reading on 24 February 2017, Davies spoke for 91 minutes and proposed amendments (which were defeated), but was unsuccessful in blocking the Preventing and Combating Violence Against Women and Domestic Violence (Ratification of Convention) Bill, which was passed by 138 votes to 1, with Davies being the only MP to vote against. The government supported the bill.

Sophie Walker, the leader of the Women's Equality Party, stood against Davies in his Shipley constituency at the 2017 general election, but was defeated, with Davies noting that she lost her deposit. According to Walker, Davies "is a sexist misogynist who puts his own ego ahead of his constituents" and Walker wished to represent the people of Shipley "rather than using parliament as a stage to play out attention-seeking performances" which she believed was Davies's practice. In response, Davies said he had "consistently asked" his opponent "to quote just one thing I have ever said which has asked for a woman to be treated less favourably than a man".

In June 2018, Davies spoke for 148 minutes on the Mental Health Units (Use of Force) Bill, which had over 100 amendments tabled to it. It has been argued that Davies' lengthy speech had caused the blocking of passage of the upskirting bill; however, due to it being listed as the eighth bill of the day to be debated, it was not likely to have been called for debate that day. Following a point of order on the matter the Speaker of the House of Commons stated that: "It is important, however, in public debate to distinguish between fact and opinion, and simply as a matter of fact – incontrovertible fact – the Hon Gentlemen is in no way whatsoever responsible for the failure of the eighth bill to be debated."

In March 2019, Davies was one of 21 MPs who voted against LGBT inclusive sex and relationship education in English schools.

In May 2021, it was announced that Davies had been re-elected to the Women and Equalities Committee. He stated: "I want to use my time back on the committee to promote true equality – that people’s sex, race, religion and sexuality are irrelevant – and that we should ensure the law applies equally to all, and that jobs should be given to people based on merit and merit alone, and I want to challenge the division of identity politics."

==== Disability ====
Davies said in Parliament in 2011 that some disabled workers were, by definition, not as productive in their work as others and that the minimum wage may be a "hindrance" to some disabled jobseekers. Davies said: "If they feel that for a short period of time, taking a lower rate of pay to help them get on their first rung of the jobs ladder is a good thing, I don't see why we should be standing in their way." Among others, Davies was criticised by Labour's Anne Begg and a member of his own parliamentary party, and the Conservative Party distanced itself from his comments. Representatives from the mental illness charities Mind and Rethink Mental Illness called his suggestion "preposterous" and "seriously misguided". Davies' response was that the furore over his comments was "left-wing hysteria".

As part of his use of the filibuster technique, in October 2015, Davies led a sequence of speeches that resulted in a private members' bill exempting parking charges for hospital carers being 'talked out'. Davies spoke for 90 minutes to "talk out" the bill proposed by Labour MP Julie Cooper. He said he objected to the bill because he was concerned it would cause higher parking charges for disabled people and a reduction in revenue for hospitals. The comedian Russell Howard in his programme Good News, called him an "arsehole", "windbag", "wanker" and a "toad-faced hypocrite" and accused the MP of filibustering. Davies complained on the grounds of "inaccuracy" and "misrepresentation" and the BBC was forced to publish in the Clarifications and Corrections section of the BBC website stating "Davies did not personally use up all the time available for the debate and that almost three hours remained after he sat down". The BBC stated "that the programme did not fully represent his comments, which were, that it would be in the best interests of disabled people, and others, to be allowed to offer to work for less than the minimum wage, if the alternative were no employment at all". The broadcaster also agreed not to air the episode again due to their misrepresentation of Davies' position. The BBC Trust later rejected an escalation of the complaint by Davies.

In 2017, further complaints were upheld on the issue of the BBC again misrepresenting Davies' position on employment of the disabled, with an article in March that year falsely claiming Davies "had told Parliament that disabled people should work for less than minimum wage". The piece was corrected to state: "Mr Davies had said that people with disabilities should have the option of working for less than the minimum wage".

==== Global poverty ====
In March 2010, Davies was criticised by The Guardian, and religious organisations, for using Parliamentary rules to "wreck" the Debt Relief (Developing Countries) Bill, an anti-poverty measure designed to stop "vulture funds" from buying up the debt of third-world countries in order to aggressively pursue repayments through the international courts. The bill was temporarily stopped because an anonymous Conservative MP shouted "object", but was passed into law after intervention by Conservative whips.

==== Reform of parliament ====
Davies is against introducing proportional representation and having an elected House of Lords. The Power 2010 campaign ran a full-page advertisement in The Guardian stating Davies was one of six MPs accused of "failing our democracy" by opposing parliamentary reform. Davies responded in the local press saying that it was "misleading not to put on the poster which issues I am for or against", but had "no complaints about them including things that are correct, but they must be clear on my views on ID cards and English voting". He said he was against proportional representation, in common with "many Tory and Labour MPs", and any change to the House of Lords.

==== Smoking ====
In March 2011, Davies said that there was "no basis in evidence" that restricting branding on cigarette packets would reduce smoking levels, stating: "I believe that the introduction of plain packaging for cigarettes is gesture politics of the worst kind. It would not have any basis in evidence and it would simply be a triumph for the nanny state and an absurd one at that". The physician Ben Goldacre outlined in a column in The Guardian the evidence base that Davies claimed did not exist, concluding that: "If you don't care about this evidence, or you think jobs are more important than people killed by cigarettes, or you think libertarian principles are more important than both, then that’s a different matter. But if you say the evidence doesn't show evidence of harm from branded packaging, you are simply wrong".

Davies objected to banning smoking in cars with children in a 2011 debate on a private members' bill proposed by the Labour MP Alex Cunningham who said the "science was clear" about the risks from passive smoking. According to Davies, it should be a parental decision and there was a "complete lack of evidence" on the benefits. It eventually became an amendment to the Children and Families Bill.

==== COVID-19 restrictions and lockdown ====
Davies was critical of restrictions put in place following the COVID-19 pandemic, such as a 10 pm pub curfew, calling Health Secretary Matt Hancock a "nanny state socialist" for supporting them. In 2020, he rebelled against his party by voting against further restrictions, and asked the Prime Minister, Boris Johnson, how many lost jobs and failed businesses were "a price worth paying to continue pursuing this failed strategy of lockdowns and arbitrary restrictions". In November 2020, he called for the government to give Vitamin D to citizens to help boost their immune systems against COVID-19 (see Vitamin D deficiency).

== Post-parliamentary career ==
On Monday 2 December, it was announced that Davies had been appointed as the Chairman of Star Sports Group of Companies; succeeding Russ Wiseman.

On his appointment, Davies said: “I am delighted to be joining Star Sports at such an exciting time in the company’s history. I have been lucky enough to get to know Ben [Keith] over the last few years and I have huge admiration for the business that he has built."

== Personal life ==
Davies married Deborah Gail Hemsley, whom he met whilst studying at Huddersfield Polytechnic, in July 1994 in Doncaster. The couple have two sons. They separated in 2011, blaming the pressures of his role as an MP, and divorced in November 2012. She was continuing to work for Davies as his part-time secretary in late 2016. He lives in Shipley and also has shared a flat in London with fellow MP Esther McVey, with whom he reportedly had a "long time on-and-off romantic interest". In May 2019, the BBC's Politics Live programme reported that McVey and Davies were engaged. On 19 September 2020, Davies married McVey in a private ceremony.

Davies and McVey present two weekly shows together on GB News; in April 2023, Ofcom announced it was investigating GB News over whether the show broke impartiality rules, following an interview with Jeremy Hunt earlier that year.

In September 2024, Davies announced he had undergone a quadruple heart bypass on the NHS following a heart attack.

Parliament of the United Kingdom
Preceded by Chris Leslie	Member of Parliament for Shipley; 2005–2024	Succeeded by Anna Dixon
