= Joseph Craven (politician) =

Joseph Craven (14 December 1825 – 29 November 1914) was a British worsted manufacturer and a Gladstonian Liberal politician who sat in the House of Commons from 1885 to 1892.

== Early life ==
Born on 14 December 1825, he was the elder son of Joshua and Ann (Briggs) Craven of Close Head in Thornton, near Bradford, Yorkshire. His father was a worsted stuff manufacturer, one of the "old masters" who gave out work to cottage-based weavers and sold their finished pieces on the Bradford market. Joseph was educated at the Manor House Academy, Hartshead Moor, and expected to progress to study medicine but, when he was aged fourteen, his father's ill health obliged him to leave school and take over management of the family business, in which he became his father's partner in 1845.

== Commercial activity ==
Craven persuaded his father that their hand-loom based enterprise could not compete with the economies of power-loom production and the pair commenced weaving with steam power in rented premises at Lower Globe Mill, Bradford. In 1847 they transferred production to Thornton's Prospect Mill, of which Craven had laid the foundation stone on his twenty-first birthday and where 300 looms and 420 employees were busy by 1851. In that year the Cravens displayed examples of their plain-backs and shalloons at the Great Exhibition, and in 1854 they added spinning to their weaving operation, more than doubling the size of Prospect Mill.

Craven was an influential figure in the Bradford textile trade from the early 1850s and supplied Richard Cobden with particulars of the trade in preparation for the Cobden–Chevalier Treaty negotiation. He was instrumental in establishing the Bradford Chamber of Commerce in 1851 and was a member of its council for many years. He was later also a member of the Executive Council of the national Association of Chambers of Commerce.

His father retired in 1862 and died on 2 December 1874 "full of years and honour". Six days later Joseph Craven's only son, who had joined the family business and was "in the bloom of youth and full of promise", also died. The double bereavement sent Craven into temporary decline and in 1875 he sold the business, which was then employing between 500 and 600 people. His wife died in the following year after a long illness, and he remained a widower for nearly four decades, continuing to live at Ashfield, the Italianate villa he had built overlooking Prospect Mill.

== Work in the community ==
Craven took an active part in the development of amenities for the rapidly growing township of Thornton. He facilitated improvements in its water supply and reduction in the local cost of coal, donated the site of the Mechanics’ Institute, funded the nucleus of its library, and paid for the construction and furnishing of the associated lecture-hall and gymnasium. He was Chairman of the Thornton Local Board from 1867 and a member of the Bierley Board of Guardians from 1873. He served as a governor of Thornton Grammar School and endowed the Craven Scholarship Trust which enabled boys and girls to proceed through elementary education to advanced evening classes at the Mechanics’ Institute and then to Bradford Technical College (on the Council of which Craven sat).

== Political beginnings ==
As a Liberal Radical he was active in local politics from the late 1840s, advocating civil and religious liberty, peace, retrenchment and reform. He was, with Titus Salt, one of the two Bradford signatories to the National Address of January 1858 setting out a proposed agenda for Parliamentary Reform, and he supported the objectives of the Liberation Society, acknowledging its founder Edward Miall as "one of his political fathers".

In 1868 he led a public call for amicable resolution of the disputed result of the election for Bradford Borough's two Parliamentary seats. In a three-cornered contest, W. E. Forster and Henry Ripley (Liberals of different stripes) had topped the poll, whereupon the unsuccessful Edward Miall (for whom Craven had spoken during his campaign) petitioned for Ripley's election to be overturned on the ground of corrupt practices.

Commenting on Craven's intervention, the Bradford Review observed he "is a good Liberal, no doubt, but surely has never been identified with the advanced Liberals of Bradford such as to warrant him assuming to represent the party on so grave a matter". The intervention failed to produce an amicable outcome but Craven's initiative in the matter, coupled with his subsequent publication of an appeal for party unity following the success of Miall's petition, served to raise his political profile. By 1877, when he appeared on the same platform as John Bright, he was described as one of the leading Liberals of the Bradford district.

During reform of the Liberals’ local organisation in readiness for implementation of the Redistribution of Seats Act 1885, he was elected a vice-president of the party's Keighley association and was invited to become the Liberal candidate for the new Spen Valley constituency. He accepted the Spen Valley invitation subject to it having the constituency association's unanimous support. This was withheld by the association's teetotal faction when Craven would not endorse the Local Option policy (whereby districts could vote to make abstinence compulsory within their boundaries).

== MP for Shipley ==
In May 1885 the Liberals of the new Shipley constituency adopted as their Parliamentary candidate W. E. Gladstone, who was then Prime Minister but whose government fell in the following month. Gladstone was promised Shipley would give him a secure majority at the forthcoming General Election but, confident of holding his Midlothian seat, he declined Shipley's nomination. In his place the local Liberals selected Joseph Craven, who was reported to have "required a good deal of pressure" to accept the nomination but was ultimately persuaded by its enthusiastic unanimity.

At the 1885 election, he was duly elected Shipley's first Member of Parliament (MP) with a majority of 2,197 and a total number of votes, 7,022, which was the largest cast for any candidate in England's non-borough constituencies. The subsequent split at national level between Home Rule and Unionist Liberals resulted in a further general election in 1886 which condemned the party to six years in opposition but at which Craven, who was described as having kept his seat "warm and cosy", was returned unopposed.

It was his vote rather than his voice that Craven brought to the Commons debating chamber. He almost invariably supported the policies and positions adopted by Gladstone but had the reputation of voting out of conviction rather than simple loyalty, requiring persuasion on every issue. He was always eager to obtain personal insight into matters and in this respect often worked closely with his fellow West Riding MPs Alfred Illingworth and Briggs Priestley: with them he made fact-finding tours of Ireland in 1887 and South Africa in 1889, and with Priestley he had visited India in 1885. He was an attentive constituency member, consulting his association committee on policy issues and regularly reporting on Parliament's proceedings either in person or in writing.

He experienced bouts of ill health, usually from gout or bronchitis, and in early 1891 was confined to London's Hotel Metropole with pleurisy, his condition occasioning "great alarm". On returning to England from Egypt in May 1890 he had advised his constituency executive he did not intend to seek re-election; he attributed this resolve to poor health but, when his decision was made public in 1891, the Shipley Times observed "It is understood that Parliamentary life has never had very great fascination for him".

During Craven's tenure of the Shipley seat, the local consensus between old Liberals and labour-based groups held firm but as the 1892 General Election approached the Liberal association split into factions respectively supporting Alfred Hutton and William Byles to be the party's candidate. Hutton, who had earlier been officially adopted as candidate, resigned and in an attempt to reunite the party his supporters asked Craven to stand for re-election as the Gladstonian candidate if Byles would also withdraw. Craven was amenable, but Byles would not withdraw and narrowly carried the seat against a Conservative Unionist at the subsequent election.

Craven took no active part in politics after 1892 beyond continuing to serve on the West Riding County Council, to which he had been elected in 1889. He briefly retained his directorship of the Bradford Banking Company, was appointed a magistrate in 1894 and regularly sat on the Bradford bench during the next ten years. On the Glorious Twelfth of 1905, aged nearly eighty, he turned out for his fifty-second consecutive season of grouse shooting when he was described as a "wonderful shot for his years".

== Church and charity ==
He was brought up as a Congregationalist, his family having long been associated with Kipping Independent Chapel, Thornton, where his father was a deacon and superintendent and choir-leader of the Sunday School. Craven had himself "filled all the offices it was possible to hold in that department" and was a considerable patron of Sunday Schools from the days when they provided general elementary as well as religious instruction. He subscribed to the costs of building and improving chapels of all Protestant dissenting persuasions, was a liberal donor to Thornton Parish Church, and was particularly supportive of the Congregational central building fund.

He made substantial gifts to all causes that he thought worthwhile. In August 1909 alone, his donations included £5,000 each to Bradford Infirmary and the Congregational Union. The people of Thornton were reported to regard him "as a philanthropist with no equal", there being many villagers to whom he paid weekly allowances that were their only means of subsistence, and at New Year he was in the habit of sending out suitable gifts to those in need, identifying himself only as "AT" (a Thorntonian).

He was a governor of Airedale Independent College and Crossley Orphanage, sat on the Central and Yorkshire Committees of the Royal Albert Institution and was a patron of Bradford's Nutter Orphanage.

== Death and family ==
Despite several bouts of pneumonia, Craven survived until nearly eighty-nine, remaining alert and closely interested in current events until his death, at home, on 29 November 1914. Exactly twelve years earlier he had enjoyed the long obituary tribute to him which the Leeds Mercury published following confusion with a local namesake. Among the friends attending his funeral on "a raw, cold morning" at Kipping was Percy Illingworth, the Liberal Chief Whip; returning to London immediately afterwards, Illingworth took to his bed with a "severe chill" which transpired to be typhoid and resulted in his death a month later.

At the age of nineteen, Craven married Ellen Knowles, a daughter of Jonathan Knowles, proprietor of the Denholme Gate Brewery. Her step-mother, Mary Knowles, was the eldest child of Rev. Thomas Crowther of Cragg Vale. The Cravens’ marriage produced a son and six daughters, including

- Martha (1847–1935), who married Rev. James Gregory (son of the minister at Kipping Chapel) and was the mother of Eric Craven Gregory
- Anne (1852–1934), who married John Hodgson, heir to the 7,000-acre Nocton Hall estate which his father had purchased from the profits of a loom-manufacturing business built on the back of a first order from Joseph Craven
- Ruth (1856–1954), who married Sir William Priestley.

A photographic portrait of Craven was included in the Sachs Studio's Bradford Portraits, published by Beckett, Rudston & Beckett of Bradford in 1892.

Parliament of the United Kingdom
New constituency	Member of Parliament for Shipley; 1885 – 1892	Succeeded by William Byles
