= NLGN =

NLGN may refer to:

- Neuroligin, a protein
- New Local Government Network, a think tank of the United Kingdom
