= Women and Equalities Committee =

UK House of Commons select committee

The Women and Equalities Committee is a select committee of the House of Commons in the Parliament of the United Kingdom. It was established following the 2015 general election to examine the expenditure, administration and policy of the Government Equalities Office on equalities (sex, age, race, sexual orientation, disability and transgender/gender identity) issues.

The committee has faced criticism for its name, and in 2017, Conservative MP Philip Davies said it should be renamed the "Equalities Committee".

== Chairs ==
Committee chairs include those listed below.

Name	Start	End	Party	Constituency
Maria Miller	18 June 2015	6 November 2019	Conservative	Basingstoke
Caroline Nokes	27 January 2020	30 May 2024	Conservative	Romsey and Southampton North
Sarah Owen	11 September 2024	23 July 2026	Labour	Luton North
Liv Bailey	14 September 2026	present	Labour	Reading West and Mid Berkshire

== Membership ==
Membership of the committee is as follows:

Member	Party	Constituency
Olivia Bailey MP (Chair)	Labour	Reading West and Mid Berkshire
Alex Brewer MP	Liberal Democrats	North East Hampshire
Rosie Duffield MP	Independent	Canterbury
Nia Griffith MP	Labour	Llanelli
Christine Jardine MP	Liberal Democrats	Edinburgh West
Kim Leadbeater MP	Labour	Spen Valley
Kevin McKenna MP	Labour	Sittingbourne and Sheppey
Richard Quigley MP	Labour	Isle of Wight West
Shivani Raja MP	Conservative	Leicester East
Rachel Taylor MP	Labour	North Warwickshire and Bedworth
Nadia Whittome MP	Labour	Nottingham East

=== Changes since 2024 ===
Date	Outgoing Member & Party	Constituency	→	New Member & Party	Constituency	Source
2 June 2025	Shivani Raja MP (Conservative)	Leicester East	→	Rebecca Paul MP (Conservative)	Reigate	Hansard
27 October 2025	Kirith Entwistle MP (Labour)	Bolton North East	→	Kevin McKenna MP (Labour)	Sittingbourne and Sheppey	Hansard
27 October 2025	Natalie Fleet MP (Labour)	Bolsover	→	Kim Leadbeater MP (Labour)	Spen Valley	Hansard
27 October 2025	Catherine Fookes MP (Labour)	Monmouthshire	→	Nadia Whittome MP (Labour)	Nottingham East	Hansard
3 November 2025	Samantha Niblett MP (Labour)	South Derbyshire	→	Nia Griffith MP (Labour)	Llanelli	Hansard
22 June 2026	David Burton-Sampson MP (Labour)	Southend West and Leigh	→	Richard Quigley MP (Labour)	Isle of Wight West	Hansard
1 September 2026	Sarah Owen MP (chair, Labour)	Luton North	→	Vacant		Hansard
14 September 2026	Vacant		→	Olivia Bailey MP (Chair, Labour)	Reading West and Mid Berkshire	Hansard
21 October 2026	Rebecca Paul MP (Conservative)	Reigate	→	Shivani Raja MP (Conservative)	Leicester East	Hansard

== 2019-2024 Parliament ==
The chair was elected on 27 January 2020, with the members of the committee being announced on 2 March 2020.

Member	Party	Constituency
Caroline Nokes MP (Chair)	Conservative	Romsey and Southampton North
Nickie Aiken MP	Conservative	Cities of London and Westminster
Sara Britcliffe MP	Conservative	Hyndburn
Angela Crawley MP	Scottish National Party	Lanark and Hamilton East
Virginia Crosbie MP	Conservative	Ynys Môn
Alex Davies-Jones MP	Labour	Pontypridd
Rosie Duffield MP	Labour	Canterbury
Peter Gibson MP	Conservative	Darlington
Kim Johnson MP	Labour	Liverpool Riverside
Kate Osborne MP	Labour	Jarrow
Nicola Richards MP	Conservative	West Bromwich East

=== Changes 2019-2024 ===
Date	Outgoing Member & Party	Constituency	→	New Member & Party	Constituency	Source
11 May 2020	Rosie Duffield MP (Labour)	Canterbury	→	Bell Ribeiro-Addy MP (Labour)	Streatham	Hansard
20 July 2020	Nickie Aiken MP (Conservative)	Cities of London and Westminster	→	Elliot Colburn MP (Conservative)	Carshalton and Wallington	Hansard
7 September 2020	Virginia Crosbie MP (Conservative)	Ynys Môn	→	Theo Clarke MP (Conservative)	Stafford	Hansard
1 March 2021	Sara Britcliffe MP (Conservative)	Hyndburn	→	Ben Bradley MP (Conservative)	Mansfield	Hansard
25 May 2021	Angela Crawley MP (SNP)	Lanark and Hamilton East	→	Anne McLaughlin MP (SNP)	Glasgow North East	Hansard
8 June 2021	Ben Bradley MP (Conservative)	Mansfield	→	Lee Anderson MP (Conservative)	Ashfield	Hansard
8 June 2021	Peter Gibson MP (Conservative)	Darlington	→	Philip Davies MP (Conservative)	Shipley	Hansard
2 November 2021	Nicola Richards MP (Conservative)	West Bromwich East	→	Jackie Doyle-Price MP (Conservative)	Thurrock	Hansard
14 December 2021	Lee Anderson MP (Conservative)	Ashfield	→	Caroline Dinenage MP (Conservative)	Gosport	Hansard
5 January 2022	Anne McLaughlin MP (SNP)	Glasgow North East	→	Anum Qaisar MP (SNP)	Airdrie and Shotts	Hansard
8 February 2022	Alex Davies-Jones MP (Labour)	Pontypridd	→	Carolyn Harris MP (Labour)	Swansea East	Hansard
25 October 2022	Jackie Doyle-Price MP (Conservative)	Thurrock	→	Victoria Atkins MP (Conservative)	Louth and Horncastle	Hansard
15 November 2022	Victoria Atkins MP (Conservative)	Louth and Horncastle	→	Rachel Maclean MP (Conservative)	Redditch	Hansard
29 November 2022	Theo Clarke MP (Conservative)	Stafford	→	Mark Jenkinson MP (Conservative)	Workington	Hansard
29 November 2022	Philip Davies MP (Conservative)	Shipley	→	Dr Jamie Wallis MP (Conservative)	Bridgend	Hansard
22 May 2023	Rachel Maclean MP (Conservative)	Redditch	→	Jackie Doyle-Price MP (Conservative)	Thurrock	Hansard
4 July 2023	Dr Jamie Wallis MP (Conservative)	Bridgend	→	Lia Nici MP (Conservative)	Great Grimsby	Hansard
12 September 2023	Anum Qaisar MP (SNP)	Airdrie and Shotts	→	Kirsten Oswald MP (SNP)	East Renfrewshire	Hansard
27 November 2023	Mark Jenkinson MP (Conservative)	Workington	→	Lisa Cameron MP (Conservative)	East Kilbride, Strathaven and Lesmahagow	Hansard

== 2017-2019 Parliament ==
The chair was elected on 12 July 2017, with members announced on 11 September 2017.

Member	Party	Constituency
Maria Miller MP (Chair)	Conservative	Basingstoke
Angela Crawley MP	SNP	Lanark and Hamilton East
Philip Davies MP	Conservative	Shipley
Rosie Duffield MP	Labour	Canterbury
Kirstene Hair MP	Conservative	Angus
Jared O'Mara MP	Labour	Sheffield Hallam
Jess Phillips MP	Labour	Birmingham Yardley
Gavin Shuker MP	Labour	Luton South
Tulip Siddiq MP	Labour	Hampstead and Kilburn

=== Changes 2017-2019 ===
Date	Outgoing Member & Party	Constituency	→	New Member & Party	Constituency	Source
16 October 2017	New seat		→	Eddie Hughes MP (Conservative)	Walsall North	Hansard
6 November 2017	Jared O'Mara MP (Independent)	Sheffield Hallam	→	Vacant		Hansard
20 November 2017	Vacant		→	Tonia Antoniazzi MP (Labour)	Gower	Hansard
5 March 2018	New seat		→	Vicky Ford MP (Conservative)	Chelmsford	Hansard
4 June 2018	Rosie Duffield MP (Labour)	Canterbury	→	Sarah Champion MP (Labour)	Rotherham	Hansard
4 June 2018	Tulip Siddiq MP (Labour)	Hampstead and Kilburn	→	Teresa Pearce MP (Labour)	Erith and Thamesmead	Hansard
11 June 2018	Teresa Pearce MP (Labour)	Erith and Thamesmead	→	Tulip Siddiq MP (Labour)	Hampstead and Kilburn	Hansard
26 November 2018	Kirstene Hair MP (Conservative)	Angus	→	Anna Soubry MP (Conservative)	Broxtowe	Hansard
8 May 2019	Gavin Shuker MP (Change UK)	Luton South	→	Stephanie Peacock MP (Labour)	Barnsley East	Hansard

== 2015-2017 Parliament ==
The chair was elected on 18 June 2015, with members announced on 6 July 2015.

Member	Party	Constituency
Maria Miller MP (Chair)	Conservative	Basingstoke
Ruth Cadbury MP	Labour	Brentford and Isleworth
Maria Caulfield MP	Conservative	Lewes
Jo Churchill MP	Conservative	Bury St Edmunds
Angela Crawley MP	SNP	Lanark and Hamilton East
Mims Davies MP	Conservative	Eastleigh
Flick Drummond MP	Conservative	Portsmouth South
Ben Howlett MP	Conservative	Bath
Jess Phillips MP	Labour	Birmingham Yardley
Tulip Siddiq MP	Labour	Hampstead and Kilburn
Cat Smith MP	Labour	Lancaster and Fleetwood

=== Changes 2015-2017 ===
Date	Outgoing Member & Party	Constituency	→	New Member & Party	Constituency	Source
26 October 2015	Tulip Siddiq MP (Labour)	Hampstead and Kilburn	→	Siobhain McDonagh MP (Labour)	Mitcham and Morden	Hansard
26 October 2015	Cat Smith MP (Labour)	Lancaster and Fleetwood	→	Gavin Shuker MP (Labour)	Luton South	Hansard
13 June 2016	Siobhain McDonagh MP (Labour)	Mitcham and Morden	→	Gill Furniss MP (Labour)	Sheffield Brightside and Hillsborough	Hansard
5 December 2016	Gill Furniss MP (Labour)	Sheffield Brightside and Hillsborough	→	Tracy Brabin MP (Labour)	Batley and Spen	Hansard
19 December 2016	Mims Davies MP (Conservative)	Eastleigh	→	Philip Davies MP (Conservative)	Shipley	Hansard
23 January 2017	Jo Churchill MP (Conservative)	Bury St Edmunds	→	Lucy Allan MP (Conservative)	Telford	Hansard
28 February 2017	Ruth Cadbury MP (Labour)	Brentford and Isleworth	→	Holly Lynch MP (Labour)	Halifax	Hansard

== See also ==
- Parliamentary committees of the United Kingdom
- Minister for Women and Equalities
