= Oswald Partington, 2nd Baron Doverdale =

British politician (1872-1935)

The Right Honourable The Lord Doverdale
- Oswald Partington

Member of Parliament for High Peak
- In office 1900–1910
- Preceded by: William Sidebottom
- Succeeded by: Sir Samuel Hill-Wood

Member of Parliament for Shipley
- In office 1915–1918
- Preceded by: Percy Illingworth
- Succeeded by: Sir Norman Rae

Personal details
- Born: 4 May 1872 Bury, Greater Manchester, England
- Died: 23 March 1935 (aged 62) Bolney House, Ennismore Gardens, Westminster, England
- Resting place: Hampton Lovett, Worcestershire, England
- Party: Liberal
- Spouse(s): Hon. Clara Isabel Murray (m. 1902; div. 1934) Leslie Tailer (m. 1934)
- Children: 2
- Parent: Edward Partington (father)
- Education: Rossall School

Oswald Partington, 2nd Baron Doverdale (4 May 1872 – 23 March 1935) was a Liberal Party politician in the United Kingdom.

== Career ==
The second but oldest surviving son of mill-owner Edward Partington (who became the 1st Baron Doverdale), Oswald Partington was born in Bury. Educated at Rossall School, he held a commission in the 4th (Militia) Battalion of the Cheshire Regiment. He was a justice of the peace for the counties of Cheshire and Worcestershire, and a Deputy Lieutenant of the latter county.

Partington entered the family business which involved the production and processing of wood pulp for the manufacture of paper. He became a member of the firm of Olive and Partington, with paper mills in Glossop, Derbyshire and a director of the Kellner-Partington Paper Pulp Company.

He was elected at the 1900 general election as Member of Parliament for High Peak constituency in Derbyshire, and held the seat through two further elections before his defeat at the December 1910 general election.

In March 1913 he was appointed an alderman on London County Council as a member of the Liberal-backed Progressive Party. He remained a member of the council until 1920.

He returned to the House of Commons in 1915 at an uncontested by-election for the Shipley constituency in the West Riding of Yorkshire. The vacancy occurred during the First World War, when the sitting MP, Percy Illingworth, died. Under an agreement between the parties vacant seats were to be uncontested for the duration of the conflict, with only a candidate of the party holding the seat being nominated. Partington stood down at the next general election in 1918. He succeeded his father in the peerage upon his death in 1925. He died at his London home, Bolney House in Ennismore Gardens, Westminster in 1935 aged 62. He was buried at Hampton Lovett near Droitwich, close to his country home of Westwood Park.

== Family ==
Partington was twice married. His first wedding took place at St Margaret's, Westminster on 6 August 1902, when he wed Honourable Clara Isabel Murray (1880–1945), daughter of Lord Elibank. The couple had one son and one daughter but were divorced in 1934. In 1934 he married an American widow, Leslie Tailer née Cornell, daughter of George B Cornell, of New York.

Children:

- Edward Alexander Partington (1904–1949), who succeeded as Baron Doverdale
- Honourable Aline Emily Partington (b. 1907), married 1936 Sir Kenneth Weir Hogg, 6th Baronet

== Sources ==
- Leigh Rayment's Peerage Pages
- Leigh Rayment's Historical List of MPs

Parliament of the United Kingdom
Preceded by William Sidebottom	Member of Parliament for High Peak; 1900–1910	Succeeded by Sir Samuel Hill-Wood
Preceded by Percy Illingworth	Member of Parliament for Shipley; 1915–1918	Succeeded by Sir Norman Rae
Peerage of the United Kingdom
Preceded by Edward Partington	Baron Doverdale; 1925–1935	Succeeded by Edward Partington
