= Preventing and Combating Violence Against Women and Domestic Violence (Ratification of Convention) Act 2017 =

United Kingdom law

- Act of Parliament
- Parliament of the United Kingdom
- Long title: An Act to make provision in connection with the ratification by the United Kingdom of the Council of Europe Convention on preventing and combating violence against women and domestic violence (the Istanbul Convention).
- Citation: 2017 c. 18
- Introduced by: Eilidh Whiteford (Commons); Baroness Gale (Lords)
- Territorial extent: England and Wales, Scotland and Northern Ireland

Dates
- Royal assent: 27 April 2017
- Commencement: 27 June 2017

Status: Current legislation

History of passage through Parliament

Text of statute as originally enacted

Revised text of statute as amended

The Preventing and Combating Violence Against Women and Domestic Violence (Ratification of Convention) Act 2017 (c. 18) is an act of the Parliament of the United Kingdom. The act made provisions for the ratification of the Istanbul Convention and set out a reporting process for the Secretary of State.

== Legislative passage ==
It was introduced to Parliament as a private member's bill.

The bill was subject to filibustering by a group of Conservative backbencher MPs including Philip Davies.

== Provisions ==
The provisions of the act include:

- Ensuring that, as soon as reasonably practicable after the Act was passed, the Secretary of State would be required to report to Parliament the steps needed to be taken for and the timescale within which the Istanbul Convention's ratification could be achieved.
- Ensuring that every year until ratification the Secretary of State reports to Parliament any alterations to the timescale of ratification, the measures taken by the government towards ratification and the measures still needed before ratification.
- That such a report should be given to Parliament no later than the 17 November each year.

== Timetable ==
Through the Commons

The Bill had its first reading in the House of Commons on the 29 June 2016 and its second reading on the 16 December 2016. The committee stage started on the 1 February and the committee reported on the 24 February. The Bill passed its third reading the same day with no amendments.

Through the Lords and royal assent

The Bill had its first reading on the 27 February 2017 and its second reading on the 10 March. The committee stage began on 28 March and the Bill had its third reading on the 6 April. The Bill gained royal assent on 27 April 2017.
