= Shipley (constituency) =

Parliamentary constituency in the United Kingdom

Coordinates: 53.85°N 1.82°W

- County constituency for the House of Commons
- Boundaries since 2010
- Boundary of Shipley in Yorkshire and the Humber
- Local government in England: West Yorkshire
- Electorate: 74,522 (December 2019)
- Major settlements: Shipley, Bingley, Baildon, Burley-in-Wharfedale, Menston

Current constituency
- Created: 1885
- Member of Parliament: Anna Dixon (Labour)
- Seats: One
- Created from: Northern West Riding of Yorkshire
- During its existence contributed to new seat(s) of: Bradford North (1918), Bradford South (1918)

Shipley is a constituency (Note: A county constituency (for the purposes of election expenses and type of returning officer)) represented in the House of Commons of the UK Parliament since 2024 by Anna Dixon of the Labour Party. (Note: As with all constituencies, the constituency elects one Member of Parliament (MP) by the first past the post system of election at least every five years.)

== Constituency profile ==
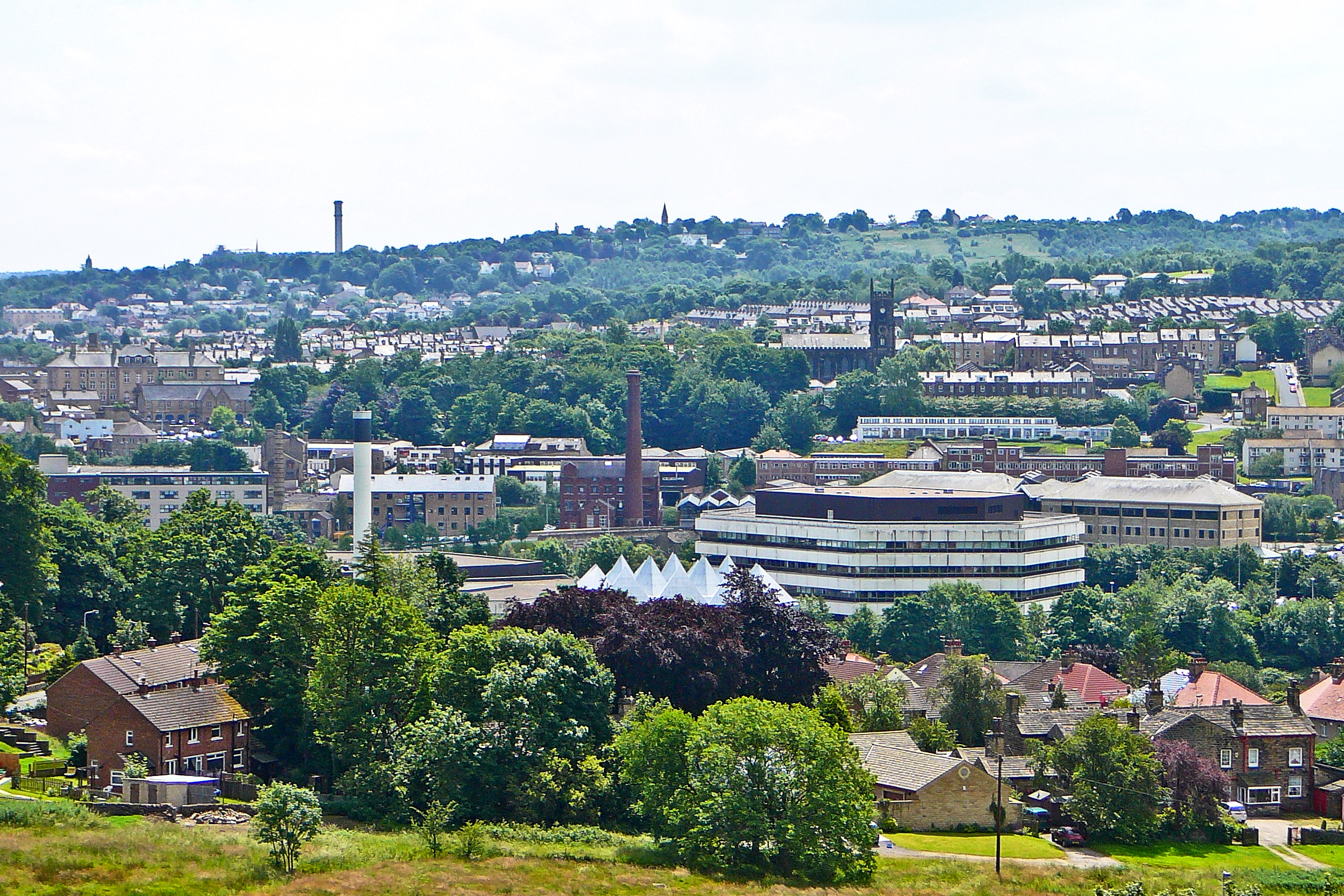
Shipley

Shipley is a constituency in West Yorkshire in England, within the City of Bradford borough. It covers the towns of Shipley, Baildon, Bingley and Denholme and the villages of Menston, Burley in Wharfedale, Wilsden and Cullingworth.

This constituency covers the towns and villages to the north and north-west of the city of Bradford. Most of its residents live in the connected towns of Shipley, Baildon and Bingley which form part of Bradford's contiguous urban area. The towns have an industrial heritage, particularly in textile manufacturing, although the mills in the area have now been demolished or redeveloped. There is some deprivation in Shipley, however Baildon, Bingley and the rural villages are generally affluent with most residents living in semi-detached or larger detached houses. House prices across the constituency are generally higher than the rest of Yorkshire but lower than the UK average.

Shipley has a low proportion of young adults and a large retired population. Residents have high levels of income and homeownership and the child poverty rate is below-average. They have average levels of education and a high proportion work in the health, manufacturing and education sectors. The percentage of residents claiming unemployment benefits is low. White people made up 89% of the population at the 2021 census.

At the local council, the main towns are represented by a mixture of Reform UK, Green Party and Conservative councillors. The rural villages primarily elected Conservatives. An estimated 52% of voters in the Shipley constituency supported remaining in the European Union in the 2016 referendum, higher than the UK-wide figure of 48%.

== Boundaries ==
1885–1918: The Municipal Borough of Bradford, and the civil parishes of Clayton, Eccleshill, Idle, North Bierley, and Shipley.

1918–1950: The Urban Districts of Baildon, Bingley, Guiseley, Shipley, and Yeadon, and in the Rural District of Wharfedale the civil parishes of Esholt, Hawksworth, and Menston.

1950–1983: The Urban Districts of Baildon, Bingley, and Shipley.

1983–2010: The District of Bradford wards of Baildon, Bingley, Bingley Rural, Rombalds, Shipley East, and Shipley West.

2010–present: The District of Bradford wards of Baildon, Bingley, Bingley Rural, Shipley, Wharfedale, and Windhill and Wrose.

The 2023 Periodic Review of Westminster constituencies left the boundaries unchanged.

== History ==
=== 1885–1970 ===
This seat was created in the Redistribution of Seats Act 1885. Until 1923 the seat was almost exclusively represented by elected Liberals and Arthur Creech Jones was Secretary of State for the Colonies (1946–1950) during most of the Attlee Ministry.

=== MPs since 1970 ===
Shipley was for a long time the seat of ex-Chairman of the Conservative 1922 Committee, Sir Marcus Fox. He held the seat for almost 30 years between the 1970 and 1997 general elections.

At the 1997 general election, the Labour candidate Chris Leslie gained the seat from Fox, becoming the youngest MP of that parliament. He held the seat at the 2001 election and became a junior minister. A number of traditional Labour supporters considered Leslie to be an ardent Blairite, though he was in fact equally close to Gordon Brown, one of whose staff he married, and whose campaign for election as Labour leader he helped run (after he had lost this seat).

Leslie narrowly lost the seat in the 2005 election, when the Conservative Party candidate Philip Davies narrowly regained the seat with a majority of 422 votes, which then increased to nearly ten thousand votes at the May 2010 general election. Davies held the seat at the next three elections, but lost it to Labour's Anna Dixon at the 2024 general election.

== Members of Parliament ==
Oswald Partington

Election	Member	Party	Notes
1885	Joseph Craven	Liberal	
1892	William Byles	Lib-Lab	
1895	James Fortescue Flannery	Liberal Unionist	
1906	Percy Illingworth	Liberal	Government Chief Whip (1912–1915), Died January 1915
1915 by-election	Oswald Partington	Liberal	Member for High Peak (1900–Dec 1910)
Constituency split, majority formed parts of Bradford North and Bradford South. Minority joined Elland, remainder merged with the majority of the abolished Otley
1918	Norman Rae	Coalition Liberal	
Jan 1922	Norman Rae	National Liberal	
Nov 1923	Norman Rae	Liberal	
Dec 1923	William Mackinder	Labour	Died September 1930
1930 by-election	James Lockwood	Conservative	
Oct 1935	James Lockwood	Ind. Conservative	
1935	Arthur Creech Jones	Labour	Secretary of State for the Colonies (1946–1950)
1950	Geoffrey Hirst	Conservative	
Jul 1966	Geoffrey Hirst	Ind. Conservative	
1970	Marcus Fox	Conservative	Chair of the 1922 Committee (1992–1997)
1997	Chris Leslie	Labour	Under-Secretary of State for Constitutional Affairs (2003–2005)
2005	Philip Davies	Conservative	
2024	Anna Dixon	Labour	

== Elections ==
=== Elections in the 2020s ===
General election 2024: Shipley
Party	Candidate	Votes	%	±%
Labour	Anna Dixon	21,738	45.0	+5.8
Conservative	Philip Davies	13,135	27.2	−23.6
Reform	Simon Dandy	7,238	15.0	N/A
Green	Kevin Warnes	3,605	7.5	+5.1
Liberal Democrats	Graham Richard Reed	1,341	2.8	−3.1
Yorkshire	Will Grant	447	0.9	−0.7
Independent	Nagbea	297	0.6	N/A
Workers Party	Waqas Ali Khan	269	0.6	N/A
SDP	Paul Shkurka	137	0.3	N/A
CPA	Darryl Neale Morton-Wright	96	0.2	N/A
Majority		8,603	17.8	N/A
Turnout		48,303	65.2	−7.7
Registered electors		74,130		
Labour gain from Conservative		Swing	▲14.7	

=== Elections in the 2010s ===
General election 2019: Shipley
Party	Candidate	Votes	%	±%
Conservative	Philip Davies	27,437	50.8	−0.5
Labour	Jo Pike	21,195	39.2	−3.4
Liberal Democrats	Caroline Jones	3,188	5.9	+1.8
Green	Celia Hickson	1,301	2.4	N/A
Yorkshire	Darren Longhorn	883	1.6	N/A
Majority		6,242	11.6	+2.9
Turnout		54,004	72.9	−0.1
Conservative hold		Swing	+1.4	

General election 2017: Shipley
Party	Candidate	Votes	%	±%
Conservative	Philip Davies	27,417	51.3	+1.3
Labour	Steve Clapcote	22,736	42.6	+11.6
Liberal Democrats	Caroline Jones	2,202	4.1	+0.2
Women's Equality	Sophie Walker	1,040	1.9	N/A
Majority		4,681	8.7	−10.3
Turnout		53,395	73.0	+5.7
Conservative hold		Swing	-5.2	

General election 2015: Shipley
Party	Candidate	Votes	%	±%
Conservative	Philip Davies	25,269	50.0	+1.4
Labour	Steve Clapcote	15,645	31.0	+2.6
UKIP	Waqas Ali Khan	4,479	8.9	N/A
Green	Kevin Warnes	2,657	5.3	+2.3
Liberal Democrats	Andrew Martin	1,949	3.9	−16.1
Yorkshire First	Darren Hill	543	1.1	N/A
Majority		9,624	19.0	−1.1
Turnout		50,542	71.7	−1.3
Conservative hold		Swing	-0.5	

General election 2010: Shipley
Party	Candidate	Votes	%	±%
Conservative	Philip Davies	24,002	48.6	+9.7
Labour	Susan Hinchcliffe	14,058	28.4	−9.4
Liberal Democrats	John Harris	9,890	20.0	+4.8
Green	Kevin Warnes	1,477	3.0	−0.4
Majority		9,944	20.1	+19.1
Turnout		49,427	73.0	+4.9
Conservative hold		Swing	+9.6	

=== Elections in the 2000s ===
Shipley, shown here after the 2005 general election as the only Conservative constituency in West Yorkshire

General election 2005: Shipley
Party	Candidate	Votes	%	±%
Conservative	Philip Davies	18,608	39.0	−1.9
Labour	Chris Leslie	18,186	38.2	−5.8
Liberal Democrats	John Briggs	7,018	14.7	+3.8
BNP	Tom Linden	2,000	4.2	N/A
Green	Quentin Deakin	1,665	3.5	+0.5
Iraq War. Not In My Name	David Crabtree	189	0.4	N/A
Majority		422	0.8	N/A
Turnout		47,666	69.7	+3.5
Conservative gain from Labour		Swing	+2.0	

General election 2001: Shipley
Party	Candidate	Votes	%	±%
Labour	Chris Leslie	20,243	44.0	+0.7
Conservative	David Senior	18,815	40.9	+3.1
Liberal Democrats	Helen Wright	4,996	10.9	−4.2
Green	Martin Love	1,386	3.0	N/A
UKIP	Walter Whitaker	580	1.3	N/A
Majority		1,428	3.1	−1.4
Turnout		46,020	66.2	−10.2
Labour hold		Swing		

=== Elections in the 1990s ===
General election 1997: Shipley
Party	Candidate	Votes	%	±%
Labour	Chris Leslie	22,962	43.3	+14.9
Conservative	Marcus Fox	19,996	37.8	−12.7
Liberal Democrats	John Cole	7,984	15.1	−4.9
Referendum	Stephen Ellams	1,960	3.7	N/A
Majority		2,966	4.5	N/A
Turnout		52,902	76.3	−5.8
Labour gain from Conservative		Swing	+13.8	

General election 1992: Shipley
Party	Candidate	Votes	%	±%
Conservative	Marcus Fox	28,463	50.4	+0.9
Labour	Annie Lockwood	16,081	28.5	+5.2
Liberal Democrats	John Cole	11,288	20.0	−6.3
Green	Colin Harris	680	1.2	+0.3
Majority		12,382	21.9	−0.3
Turnout		56,512	82.1	+2.9
Conservative hold		Swing	-2.2	

=== Elections in the 1980s ===
General election 1987: Shipley
Party	Candidate	Votes	%	±%
Conservative	Marcus Fox	26,941	49.5	−0.2
Liberal	William Wallace	14,311	26.3	−1.4
Labour	Christopher Butler	12,699	23.3	+1.7
Green	Colin Harris	507	0.9	−0.1
Majority		12,630	23.2	+1.2
Turnout		54,428	79.2	+2.2
Conservative hold		Swing	+0.6	

General election 1983: Shipley
Party	Candidate	Votes	%	±%
Conservative	Marcus Fox	25,866	49.7	−2.8
Liberal	William Wallace	14,421	27.7	+14.5
Labour	Martin Leathley	11,218	21.6	−11.6
Ecology	Stanley Shepherd	521	1.0	−0.1
Majority		11,445	22.0	+2.7
Turnout		52,026	77.0	−3.5
Conservative hold		Swing		

=== Elections in the 1970s ===
General election 1979: Shipley
Party	Candidate	Votes	%	±%
Conservative	Marcus Fox	22,641	52.55	+8.56
Labour	Peter R Ward	14,281	33.15	−3.63
Liberal	G G Roberts	5,673	13.17	−6.04
Ecology	D R Pedley	486	1.13	N/A
Majority		8,360	19.40	
Turnout		43,081	80.51	
Conservative hold		Swing		

General election October 1974: Shipley
Party	Candidate	Votes	%	±%
Conservative	Marcus Fox	18,518	43.99	+0.86
Labour	M J Wedgeworth	15,482	36.78	+2.87
Liberal	G G Roberts	8,094	19.23	−3.31
Majority		3,036	7.21	
Turnout		42,094	81.00	
Conservative hold		Swing		

General election February 1974: Shipley
Party	Candidate	Votes	%	±%
Conservative	Marcus Fox	19,439	43.13	−7.3
Labour	M J Wedgeworth	15,284	33.91	−5.0
Liberal	G G Roberts	10,158	22.54	+11.9
Independent Democratic Alliance	C G Campion	192	0.43	N/A
Majority		4,155	9.22	
Turnout		45,073	87.41	
Conservative hold		Swing		

General election 1970: Shipley
Party	Candidate	Votes	%	±%
Conservative	Marcus Fox	20,938	50.37	
Labour	Norman Free	16,161	38.88	
Liberal	A.M. Micklem	4,468	10.75	
Majority		4,777	11.49	
Turnout		41,567	82.42	
Conservative hold		Swing		

=== Elections in the 1960s ===
General election 1966: Shipley
Party	Candidate	Votes	%	±%
Conservative	Geoffrey Hirst	18,466	46.47	
Labour	John Collins	16,966	42.70	
Liberal	James P Heppell	4,304	10.83	
Majority		1,500	3.77	
Turnout		39,736	86.58	
Conservative hold		Swing		

General election 1964: Shipley
Party	Candidate	Votes	%	±%
Conservative	Geoffrey Hirst	19,076	57.95	
Labour	Christopher Price	15,545	39.07	
Liberal	James P Heppell	5,165	12.98	
Majority		3,531	8.88	
Turnout		39,786	86.67	
Conservative hold		Swing		

=== Elections in the 1950s ===
General election 1959: Shipley
Party	Candidate	Votes	%	±%
Conservative	Geoffrey Hirst	22,536	56.97	
Labour	Michael English	17,025	43.03	
Majority		5,511	13.94	
Turnout		39,561	87.02	
Conservative hold		Swing		

General election 1955: Shipley
Party	Candidate	Votes	%	±%
Conservative	Geoffrey Hirst	22,582	56.69	
Labour	Ernest Gardner	17,251	43.31	
Majority		5,331	13.38	
Turnout		39,833	86.21	
Conservative hold		Swing		

General election 1951: Shipley
Party	Candidate	Votes	%	±%
Conservative	Geoffrey Hirst	20,396	47.78	
Labour	Thomas J Roberts	18,893	44.26	
Liberal	Stanley Berwin	3,399	7.96	
Majority		1,503	3.52	
Turnout		42,688	90.48	
Registered electors				
Conservative hold		Swing		

General election 1950: Shipley
Party	Candidate	Votes	%
Conservative	Geoffrey Hirst	18,390	43.83
Labour	Arthur Creech Jones	18,309	43.64
Liberal	William Albert Lupton	5,021	11.97
Communist	L.T. Robb	237	0.56
Majority		81	0.19
Turnout		41,957	89.31
Registered electors			
Conservative win (new boundaries)			

=== Election in the 1940s ===
General election 1945: Shipley
Party	Candidate	Votes	%	±%
Labour	Arthur Creech Jones	25,027	50.11	
Conservative	Harry Hylton-Foster	17,097	34.23	
Liberal	Eric Robinson	7,820	15.66	
Majority		7,930	15.88	
Turnout		49,944	80.39	
Registered electors				
Labour hold		Swing		

=== Elections in the 1930s ===
General election 1935: Shipley
Party	Candidate	Votes	%	±%
Labour	Arthur Creech Jones	16,102	36.0	+1.5
Liberal	Percy Illingworth	11,595	25.9	N/A
Conservative	Thomas Howarth	10,998	24.6	−39.4
Ind. Conservative	James Lockwood	6,025	13.5	N/A
Majority		4,507	10.1	N/A
Turnout		44,720	77.5	−2.4
Registered electors				
Labour gain from Conservative		Swing		

General election 1931: Shipley
Party	Candidate	Votes	%	±%
Conservative	James Lockwood	27,304	64.0	+32.9
Labour	William Albert Robinson	14,725	34.5	−7.8
New Party	W.J. Leaper	601	1.4	N/A
Majority		12,579	29.5	+18.3
Turnout		42,630	79.7	−5.3
Registered electors				
Conservative hold		Swing		

Shipley by-election 1930
Party	Candidate	Votes	%	±%
Conservative	James Lockwood	15,238	36.0	+4.9
Labour	William Albert Robinson	13,537	32.1	−10.2
Liberal	Arthur Davy	12,785	30.2	+3.6
Communist	Willie Gallacher	701	1.7	N/A
Majority		1,665	3.9	N/A
Turnout		42,261	80.0	−5.0
Registered electors				
Conservative gain from Labour		Swing		

=== Elections in the 1920s ===
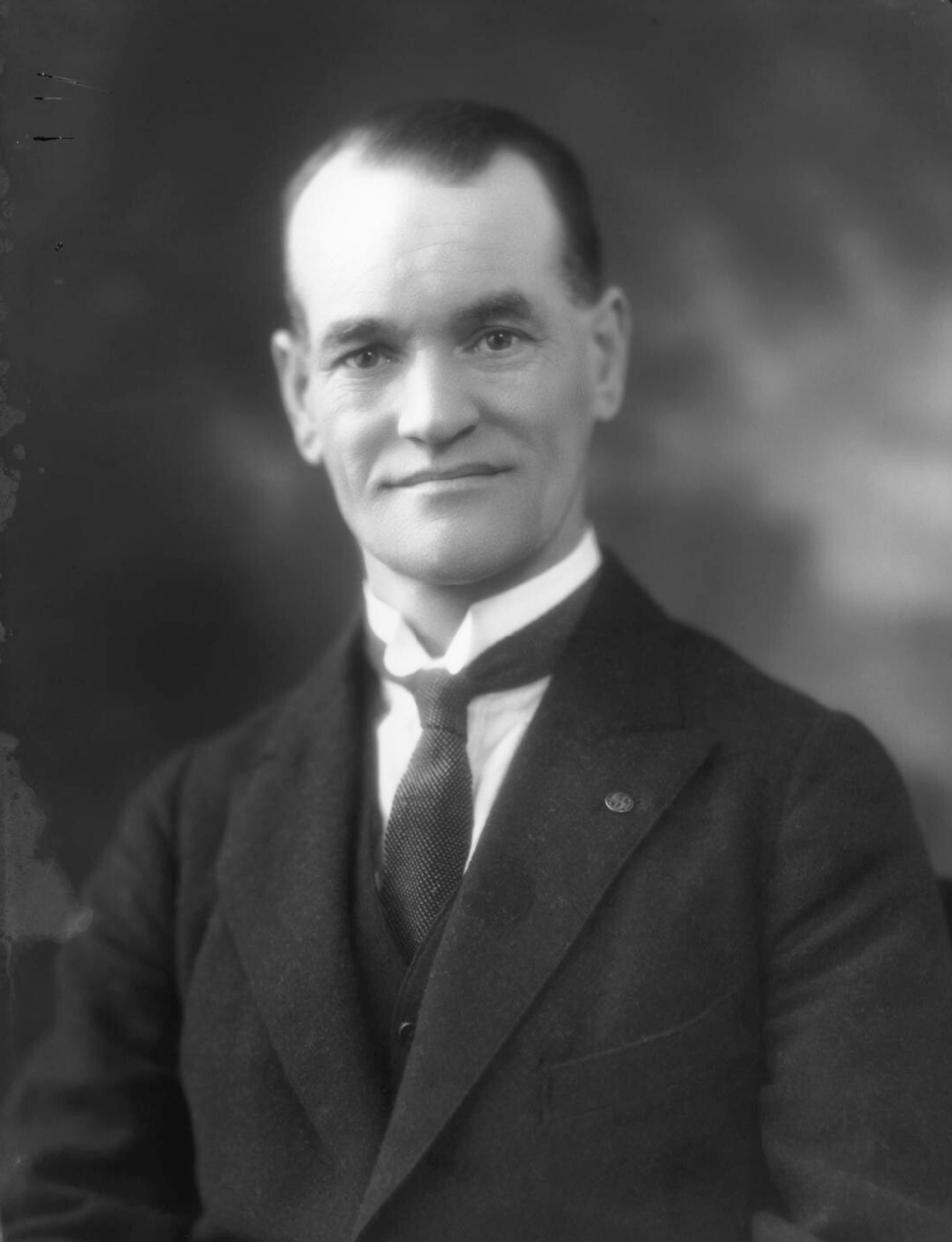
Mackinder

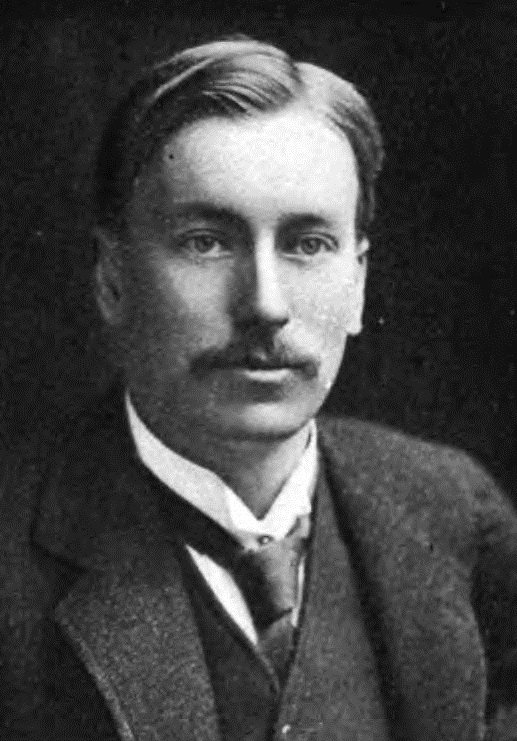
Hirst

General election 1929: Shipley
Party	Candidate	Votes	%	±%
Labour	William Mackinder	18,654	42.3	+6.3
Unionist	Robert Clough	13,693	31.1	−3.1
Liberal	Francis Hirst	11,712	26.6	−3.2
Majority		4,961	11.2	+9.4
Turnout		44,059	85.0	−1.4
Registered electors				
Labour hold		Swing	+4.7	

General election 1924: Shipley
Party	Candidate	Votes	%	±%
Labour	William Mackinder	11,862	36.0	−2.4
Unionist	Thomas Plumer	11,266	34.2	+5.6
Liberal	John Pybus	9,800	29.8	−3.2
Majority		596	1.8	−3.6
Turnout		32,928	86.4	+3.7
Registered electors				
Labour hold		Swing	-4.0	

General election 1923: Shipley
Party	Candidate	Votes	%	±%
Labour	William Mackinder	11,918	38.4	+1.2
Liberal	John Pybus	10,262	33.0	+20.8
Unionist	Richard Garnett	8,872	28.6	N/A
Majority		1,656	5.4	8.8
Turnout		31,052	82.7	+1.0
Registered electors				
Labour gain from Liberal		Swing		

General election 1922: Shipley
Party	Candidate	Votes	%	±%
National Liberal	Norman Rae	12,201	40.6	–34.0
Labour	William Mackinder	11,160	37.2	+11.8
Liberal	Arthur Davy	6,674	12.2	N/A
Majority		1.041	3.4	−45.8
Turnout		30,035	81.7	+18.7
Registered electors				
National Liberal hold		Swing		

=== Elections in the 1910s ===
General election 1918: Shipley
Party		Candidate	Votes	%
C	National Liberal	Norman Rae	16,700	74.6
	Labour	Tom Snowden	5,690	25.4
Majority			11,010	49.2
Turnout			22,390	63.0
Registered electors				
	National Liberal win (new boundaries)			
C indicates candidate endorsed by the coalition government.

Partington

1915 Shipley by-election
Party	Candidate	Votes	%	±%
Liberal	Oswald Partington	Unopposed		
Liberal hold				

Illingworth

General election December 1910: Shipley
Party	Candidate	Votes	%	±%
Liberal	Percy Illingworth	Unopposed		
Liberal hold				

1910 Shipley by-election
Party	Candidate	Votes	%	±%
Liberal	Percy Illingworth	Unopposed		
Liberal hold				

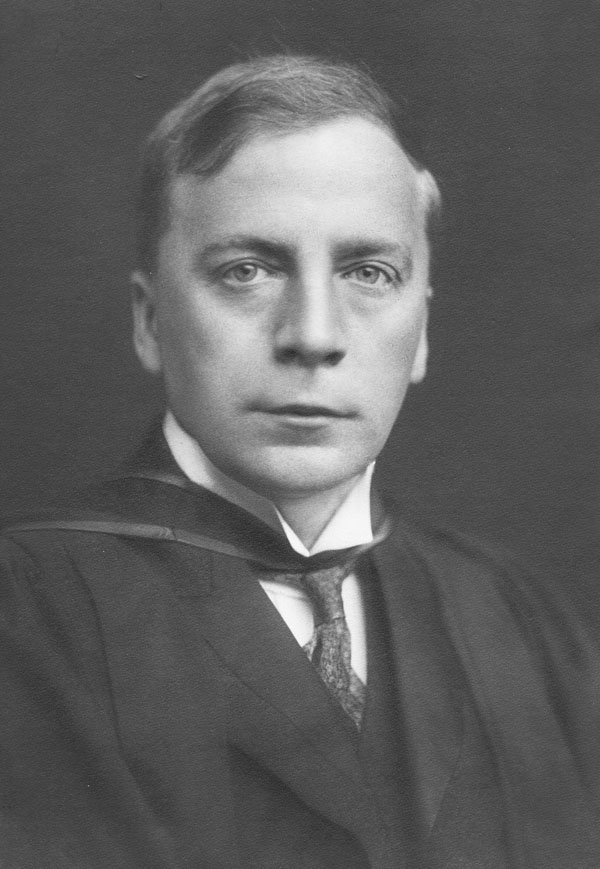
Hewins

General election January 1910: Shipley
Party	Candidate	Votes	%	±%
Liberal	Percy Illingworth	9,144	63.0	N/A
Liberal Unionist	William Hewins	5,369	37.0	N/A
Majority		3,775	26.0	N/A
Turnout		12,507	88.9	N/A
Liberal hold		Swing	N/A	

=== Elections in the 1900s ===
General election 1906: Shipley
Party	Candidate	Votes	%	±%
Liberal	Percy Illingworth	Unopposed		
Liberal hold				

Flannery

General election 1900: Shipley
Party	Candidate	Votes	%	±%
Liberal Unionist	James Fortescue Flannery	6,284	50.2	−0.1
Liberal	Percy Illingworth	6,223	49.8	+0.1
Majority		61	0.4	−0.2
Turnout		12,507	83.4	+0.4
Registered electors		14,990		
Liberal Unionist hold		Swing	-0.1	

=== Elections in the 1890s ===
General election 1895: Shipley
Party	Candidate	Votes	%	±%
Liberal Unionist	James Fortescue Flannery	5,999	50.3	+1.6
Lib-Lab	William Byles	5,921	49.7	−1.6
Majority		78	0.6	N/A
Turnout		11,920	83.0	+7.0
Registered electors		14,353		
Liberal Unionist gain from Lib-Lab		Swing	+1.6	

General election 1892: Shipley
Party	Candidate	Votes	%	±%
Lib-Lab	William Byles	5,746	51.3	N/A
Liberal Unionist	Theophilus Peel	5,464	48.7	N/A
Majority		282	2.6	N/A
Turnout		11,210	76.0	N/A
Registered electors		14,759		
Lib-Lab hold		Swing	N/A	

=== Elections in the 1880s ===
General election 1886: Shipley
Party	Candidate	Votes	%	±%
Liberal	Joseph Craven	Unopposed		
Liberal hold				

Hardy

General election 1885: Shipley
Party	Candidate	Votes	%
Liberal	Joseph Craven	7,022	59.3
Conservative	Laurence Hardy	4,825	40.7
Majority		2,197	18.6
Turnout		11,847	84.2
Registered electors		14,067	
Liberal win (new seat)			

== See also ==
- List of parliamentary constituencies in West Yorkshire
- List of parliamentary constituencies in the Yorkshire and the Humber (region)

== Sources ==
- Political Science Resources Richard Kimber
- F. W. S. Craig, British Parliamentary Election Results 1885 - 1918
- F. W. S. Craig, British Parliamentary Election Results 1974 - 1979
