= James Lockwood (British politician) =

British politician (1888–1972)

James Horace Lockwood (25 May 1888 – 29 November 1972) was a British Conservative Party politician.

He was elected as the Member of Parliament (MP) for Shipley at a by-election in November 1930 following the death of the Labour MP William Mackinder. He was re-elected at the 1931 general election, but the local Conservative Association did not re-adopt him as their candidate for the 1935 election. He stood instead as an "independent conservative", but lost his seat, finishing last of 4 candidates with only 13.5% of the votes.

Parliament of the United Kingdom
Preceded by William Mackinder	Member of Parliament for Shipley; 1930 – 1935	Succeeded by Arthur Creech Jones
