= 1910 Shipley by-election =

Parliamentary by-election

The 1910 Shipley by-election was a parliamentary by-election held for the British House of Commons constituency of Shipley in the West Riding of Yorkshire on 10 March 1910.

== Vacancy ==
The by-election was caused by the appointment of the sitting Liberal MP, Percy Illingworth to the post of Junior Lord of the Treasury, i.e. one of the government whips. Under the Parliamentary rules applying at that time this required him to resign his seat and fight a by-election.

== Candidates ==
=== Liberals ===
The Shipley Liberals re-selected Illingworth. He had been returned unopposed in the general election of 1906 and had seen off a Liberal Unionist challenger in the general election held in January 1910 just a few weeks before by a healthy majority of 3775 votes. Shipley Liberals welcomed their member’s appointment to the government and foresaw no reason to doubt he would be re-elected in the forthcoming by-election.

=== Unionists ===
It was reported that the Unionists in the Shipley constituency were unprepared to fight another contest so soon after the general election and the Shipley Division Liberal Unionists decided not to oppose Illingworth on the formal grounds that his appointment as a whip should not involve him in a fresh contest.

== Result ==
There being no other candidates putting themselves forward, Illingworth was returned unopposed.

Shipley by-election, 1910
Party	Candidate	Votes	%	±%
Liberal	Percy Illingworth	Unopposed	N/A	N/A
Liberal hold				

== See also ==
- List of United Kingdom by-elections
- United Kingdom by-election records
