= 1954 Wakefield by-election =

UK Parliamentary by-election

The 1954 Wakefield by-election was held on 21 October 1954 after the death of the incumbent Labour MP, Arthur Greenwood. It was retained by the Labour candidate Arthur Creech Jones.

The Conservative candidate, Maurice Macmillan, was the son of then-Minister of Defence and future Prime Minister Harold Macmillan. He would subsequently be a Cabinet Minister himself.

By-election 21 October 1954: Wakefield
Party	Candidate	Votes	%	±%
Labour	Arthur Creech Jones	21,822	58.14	−0.14
Conservative	Maurice Macmillan	15,714	41.86	+0.14
Majority		6,108	16.28	−0.28
Turnout		37,536		
Labour hold		Swing		
