= Geoffrey Hirst =

Geoffrey Hirst TD

Member of Parliament for Shipley
- In office 23 February 1950 – 18 June 1970
- Preceded by: Arthur Creech Jones
- Succeeded by: Marcus Fox

Personal details
- Born: 14 December 1904
- Died: 18 June 1984 (aged 79)
- Party: Conservative
- Education: University of Cambridge
- Profession: Industrialist

Geoffrey Audus Nicholson Hirst TD (14 December 1904 – 18 June 1984) was a British industrialist and politician who was a maverick Conservative Member of Parliament.

== Early career ==
Hirst, from a Yorkshire military family, was educated at Charterhouse School and St John's College, Cambridge. He went into industry, becoming President of the Leeds Chamber of Commerce; he was also Chairman of the East and West Ridings Yorkshire Regional Council of the Federation of British Industries.

== Parliament ==
During the Second World War, Hirst served with the Royal Artillery (he had been a member of the Territorial Army before it). At the 1950 general election, Hirst was elected as Conservative Member of Parliament for Shipley. He remained on the backbenches, although he did become Chairman of the Conservative Parliamentary Trade and Industry Committee. He often raised the issue of the textiles industry.

== Political activities ==
Hirst was a right-winger and supported an aggressive policy over the Suez Canal in 1956. When the Treasury Ministers Peter Thorneycroft, Enoch Powell and Nigel Birch resigned in 1958 after failing to win backing for spending cuts, Hirst said he was considering resigning the Conservative whip in sympathy with them. He did not go through with this idea, but his constituency association gave backing to him.

In June 1963, Hirst called for "a new and younger leadership" for the government before the next general election, an indirect call for Harold Macmillan to resign. During the Alec Douglas-Home government, Hirst objected to Edward Heath's bill to abolish resale price controls, and jibed that the reason the negotiations for the United Kingdom to join the European Economic Community had failed was that there was no room in Europe for two de Gaulles.

== Resigning the whip ==
With Heath as Conservative Party leader after 1965, Hirst became even more disillusioned. Following the 1966 general election, he launched a single-handed campaign against the Wilson government's Prices and Incomes Bill. On 10 July 1966 he announced that he would no longer receive the Conservative whip because the party would not vote against the Bill. He sat through the rest of the Parliament as an Independent Conservative, but did not attempt to retain his seat at the 1970 general election.

== Sources ==
- M. Stenton and S. Lees, Who's Who of British MPs, Vol. IV (Harvester Press, 1981)
- The Times.

Parliament of the United Kingdom
Preceded by Arthur Creech Jones	Member of Parliament for Shipley; 1950 – 1970	Succeeded by Marcus Fox
