= William Mackinder =

British politician and trade unionist

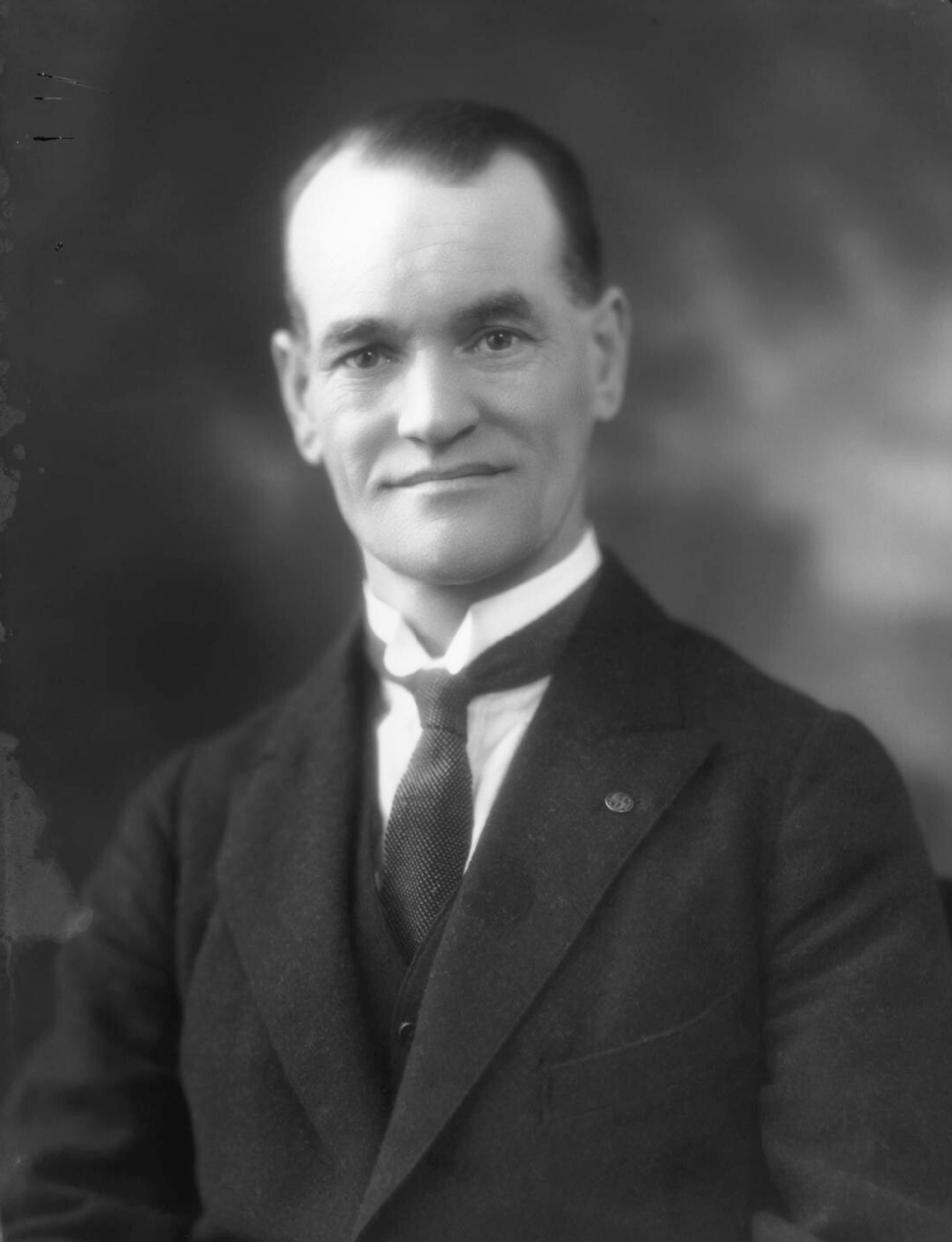

Member of Parliament for Shipley
- In office 6 December 1923 – 8 September 1930
- Preceded by: Norman Rae
- Succeeded by: James Lockwood (British politician)

Personal details
- Born: 28 April 1880 Kingston upon Hull, England
- Died: 8 September 1930 (aged 50) Bradford, England
- Party: Labour

William Mackinder (28 April 1880 – 8 September 1930) was a British trade unionist and Labour Party politician. Born in Hull, Mackinder worked in the wool industry in Bradford before becoming active in the trade union movement. He was the MP for Shipley from 1923 until his death in 1930.

== Early life ==
Mackinder was born on 28 April 1880 in Hull. At the age of 10 he began working half-time at the Bradford Spinning Mill, where he earned 1s 9d (£0.09) a week. He was expected to be at work by 6am, and was late 4 times in his first week on the job, leaving him in debt to his employer due to fines. At 13 he began working full-time on 3s 6d (£0.18) a week.

He worked variously as a woolcomber, spinner, and deep-sea fisherman. By the age of 33, Mackinder and his wife were working 111 hour weeks for 37s (£1.85) between them at the same mill.

During World War I, Mackinder served on a number of control committees. He refused an OBE for this service. From 1914 he served on the Departmental Committee on Anthrax, and he worked to prevent anthrax in the wool industry.

In 1920, Mackinder was in charge of the Yorkshire district of the Warehouse Workers' Union. After an amalgamation, he became Yorkshire Revisional Officer of the National Union of Distributive Allied Workers.

== Political career ==
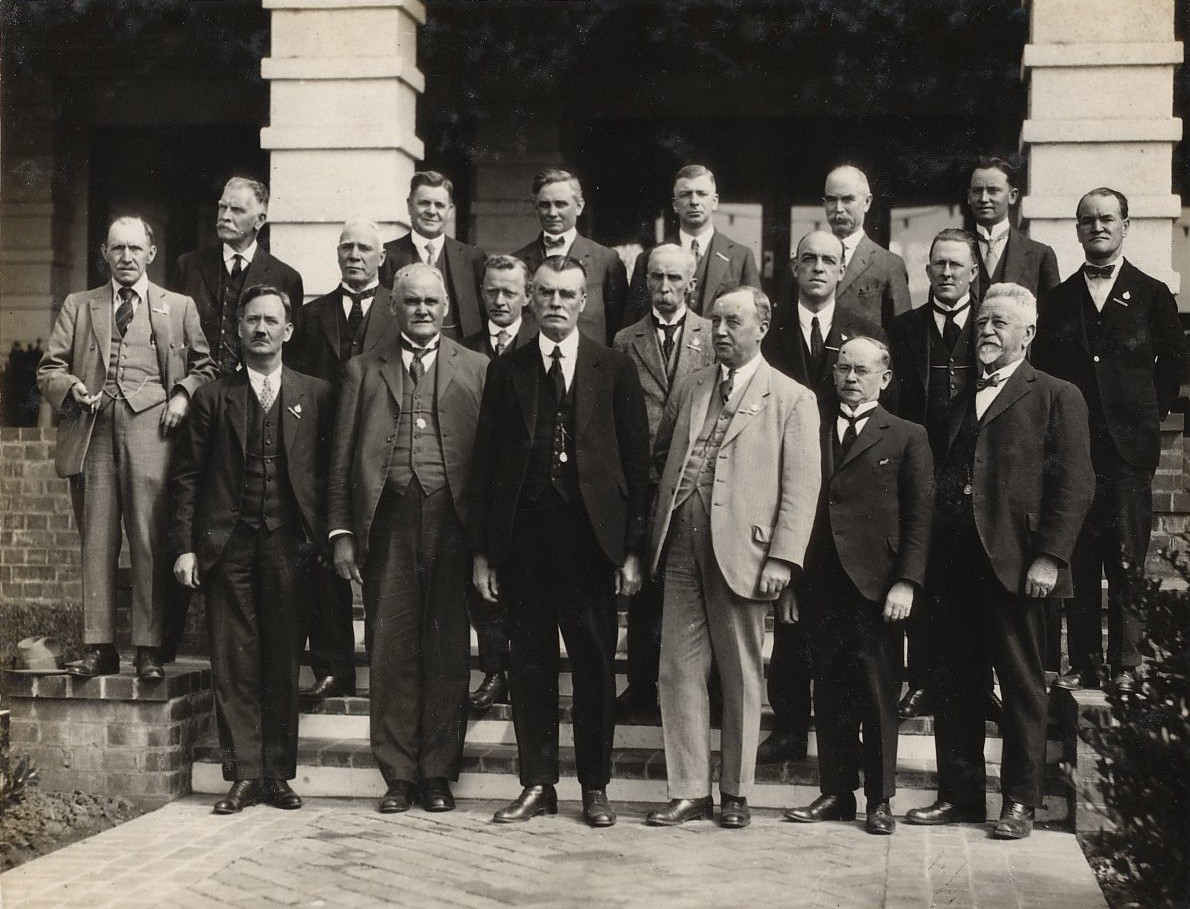
Members of the 1926 Empire Parliamentary Delegation at Hotel Canberra. Mackinder is first from the right in the back row.

Mackinder's first foray into politics came at a by-election for the Bradford City Council in 1920. During the campaign, he created controversy by claiming in speeches that wool spinners were profiteering. He had claimed that spinners were making profits of "between 400 and 3,200 per cent". He defeated the Conservative candidate George Smith by a majority of 1,221 votes, becoming the 31st Labour member on the 84-member council.

At the 1922 election, Mackinder unsuccessfully contested the Division of Shipley. In the leadup to the election, he is recorded as struggling with a lack of funds for the campaign, being in need of "£150 within a week".

In 1923 he was elected as the Labour representative for Shipley. His first parliamentary contribution was in a debate regarding a national minimum wage. In it, he recalled his family's experience struggling to get by on meagre wages. He was re-elected at the 1924 general election.

In 1925, Mackinder was one of a small group of Labour MPs to visit Bulgaria in the wake of the bombing of the St Nedelya Church. A report prepared by the MPs laid the blame for the attack at the feet of the government of Aleksandar Tsankov and its tactics in suppressing opposition activity. Their report was criticised in The Daily Telegraph as being too sympathetic to the Communist side and bearing similarities to the official line from Moscow.

He was a co-sponsor of a bill to require 8 days of paid leave per year.

In 1926 he visited Australia as part of the Empire Parliamentary Association's delegation. While returning from the trip, he wrote a semi-autobiographical novel called Bone Street. Published in 1927, it depicts his childhood in Hull and time spent as a cook on a fishing trawler.

He was re-elected at the 1929 general election.

== Sickness and death ==
Mackinder's health began to deteriorate in late 1929, when he fell ill in the House of Commons and had to be operated on for appendicitis. He was back at work after Easter of 1930, but by July he had returned to Bradford and been admitted to hospital. He died at St Luke's Hospital, Bradford at 12:20am on 8 September 1930.

Mackinder's funeral was held at the Scholemoor Cemetery on Thursday 11 September 1930. It was attended by numerous parliamentarians and members of the trade union and Labour movements. Fellow Labour MP Ben Turner, gave an address at the funeral, and also wrote an obituary in the Yorkshire Evening Post. There was no religious ceremony. He was cremated and his ashes were scattered to the wind.

Parliament of the United Kingdom
Preceded by Norman Rae	Member of Parliament for Shipley; 1923 – 1930	Succeeded by James Lockwood
