= Marcus Fox =

British politician

The Right Honourable Sir Marcus Fox MBE

Member of Parliament for Shipley
- In office 18 June 1970 – 8 April 1997
- Preceded by: Geoffrey Hirst
- Succeeded by: Chris Leslie

Personal details
- Born: John Marcus Fox; 11 June 1927 Batley, West Riding of Yorkshire, England
- Died: 16 March 2002 (aged 74) Shipley, West Yorkshire, England
- Party: Conservative
- Spouse: Ann Tindall (m. 1954)
- Children: 2

Sir John Marcus Fox MBE (11 June 1927 – 16 March 2002) was a British Conservative Party politician. He served as the Member of Parliament (MP) for Shipley from 1970 to 1997. He was chairman of the 1922 Committee between 1992 and 1997.

== Early life ==
John Marcus Fox was born at the Maternity Home, Bradford Road, Batley, Yorkshire, on Saturday, 11 June 1927. He had a twin sister with whom he attended dancing lessons. At those lessons, he met Betty Boothroyd, later to become the Speaker of the House of Commons. He attended Wheelwright Grammar School for Boys (now a campus of Kirklees College) in Dewsbury.

Fox served in the Duke of Wellington's Regiment as a Lieutenant, a detail which he was sometimes known to mention in after-dinner speeches. Fox left the Army and began his political career with his election to Dewsbury Council in 1956, remaining there until 1963. He then became a bank clerk, a sales manager for Woolworths and for Terry's in York, and then a company director. He unsuccessfully contested the parliamentary seat of Dewsbury in 1959, followed by Huddersfield West in 1966, before eventually being elected for Shipley in 1970.

== Parliamentary career ==
Following Fox's election to parliament as the MP for Shipley, he served as a whip under Edward Heath, and then was a junior minister under Margaret Thatcher. He was moved back to the back-benches in 1981, and started ascending the pole to become chairman of the 1922 Committee, becoming vice-chairman in 1983 and chairman in 1992. He received an MBE in 1963 for political services in Yorkshire, was knighted in 1986 for political service, and became a member of the Privy Council in 1996.

Fox lost his seat at the general election in 1997 to Chris Leslie, the Labour candidate.

== Personal life ==
He married Ann Tindall in 1954; they had a son and a daughter.

Fox was in poor health in the last years of his life, suffering from Alzheimer's disease as well as having multiple strokes. He died at a care home in Shipley, West Yorkshire, on 16 March 2002, at the age of 74.

Parliament of the United Kingdom
Preceded by Geoffrey Hirst	Member of Parliament for Shipley; 1970–1997	Succeeded by Chris Leslie
Political offices
Preceded by Cranley Onslow	Chairman of the 1922 Committee; 1992–1997	Succeeded by Archie Hamilton
