= Anna Dixon =

British politician

Anna Dixon MBE MP
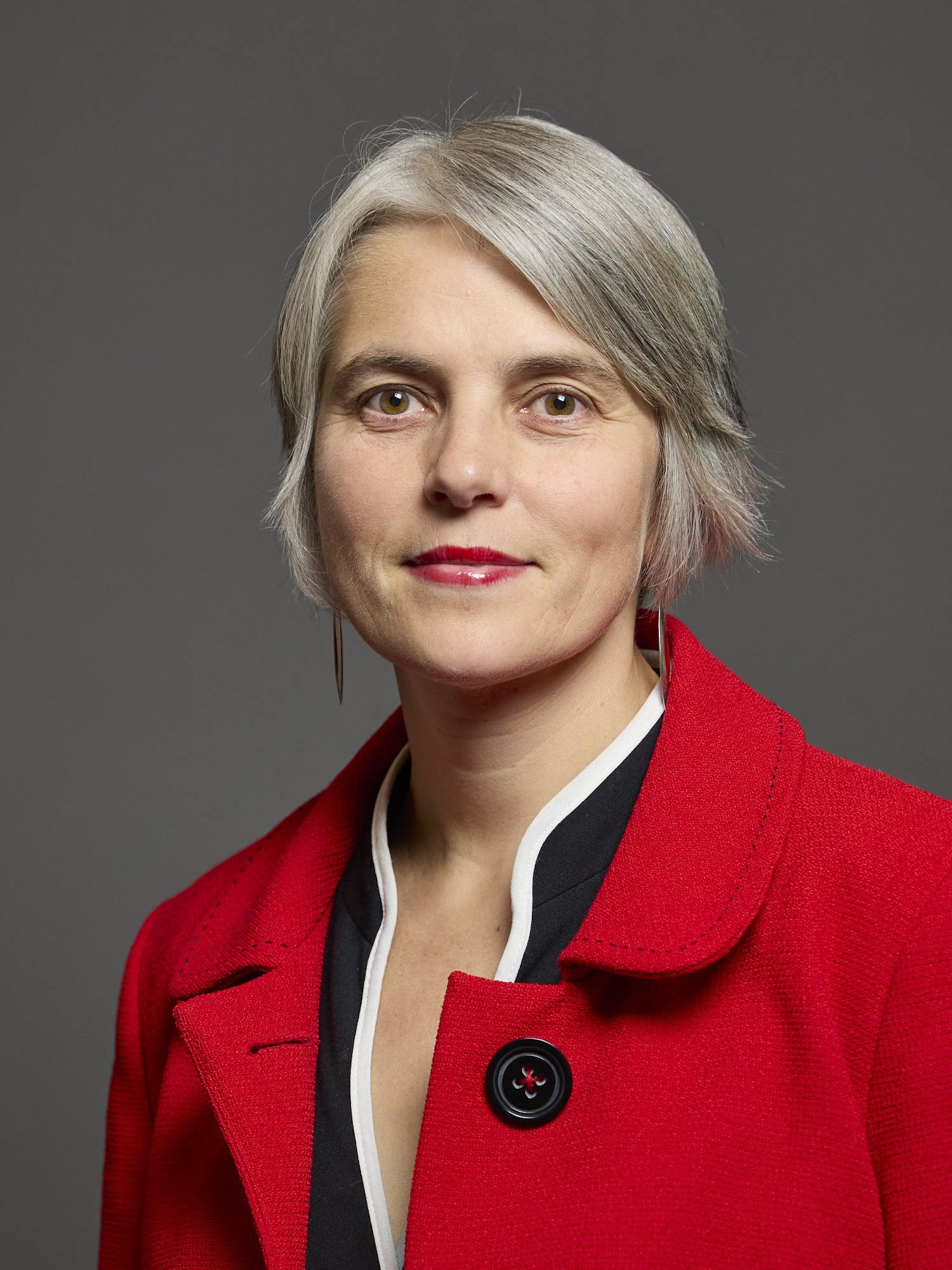
- Official portrait, 2024

Member of Parliament for Shipley
- Incumbent
- Assumed office 4 July 2024
- Preceded by: Philip Davies
- Majority: 8,603 (17.8%)

Personal details
- Party: Labour
- Education: Trinity Hall, Cambridge; London School of Hygiene and Tropical Medicine; London School of Economics
- Website: https://www.annadixonmp.co.uk/

Anna Dixon is a British Labour Party politician who has been Member of Parliament for Shipley since 2024.

== Education ==
Dixon was educated at Ilkley Grammar School in West Yorkshire. She then attended Trinity Hall, Cambridge, where she read social and political science, followed by the London School of Hygiene and Tropical Medicine and the London School of Economics, where she was awarded a PhD in social policy in 2007.

== Career ==
Dixon worked as Director of Policy at the King's Fund, before becoming Director of Quality and Strategy and Chief Analyst at the Department of Health in 2013.

In 2015 Dixon took a leadership role in the charity Centre for Ageing Better, work for which she was awarded an MBE in 2021.

Dixon was a member of the Advisory Group to the Independent Review of Adult Social Care in Scotland, between September 2020 and January 2021. In 2021 she was appointed as the chair of the Archbishop's Commission on Reimagining Care, which was published in 2023 by the Church of England.

Dixon was selected as a Labour Party general election candidate for the Shipley constituency on 31 July 2022, and ran in the 2024 general election, beating Conservative incumbent Philip Davies by 8,603 votes.

On 11 May 2026, she called on prime minister Keir Starmer to resign following the local elections, in which Labour lost control of Bradford Council.

Dixon is chair of the all-party parliamentary group on carers. In November 2026, Dixon was appointed as the Champion for Unpaid Carers.

== Selected publications ==
- The Age of Ageing Better? A Manifesto For Our Future (2020)
