= Arthur Creech Jones =

British trade unionist and politician (1891–1964)

The Right Honourable Arthur Creech Jones
- Jones in 1963

Secretary of State for the Colonies
- In office 4 October 1946 – 28 February 1950
- Preceded by: George Hall
- Succeeded by: Jim Griffiths

Under-Secretary of State for the Colonies
- In office 1945–1946
- Preceded by: The Duke of Devonshire
- Succeeded by: Ivor Thomas

Member of Parliament for Shipley
- In office 14 November 1935 – 3 February 1950
- Preceded by: James Lockwood
- Succeeded by: Geoffrey Hirst

Member of Parliament for Wakefield
- In office 21 October 1954 – 25 September 1964
- Preceded by: Arthur Greenwood
- Succeeded by: Walter Harrison

Personal details
- Born: 15 May 1891 Bristol, England
- Died: 23 October 1964 (aged 73) London, England
- Party: Labour
- Profession: Civil servant

Arthur Creech Jones (15 May 1891 – 23 October 1964) was a British trade union official and politician. Originally a civil servant, his imprisonment as a conscientious objector during the First World War forced him to change careers. He was elected to Parliament in 1935 and developed a reputation for interest in colonial matters, gaining the nickname "unofficial member of the Kikuyu at Westminster". He served in the Colonial Office in the Labour government of 1945–1950. After losing his seat in the 1950 general election he was involved in writing and lecturing about British colonies, before returning to Parliament in 1954. Initially, he was known as Arthur Jones, but throughout his time in politics he invariably used his middle name.

== Early life ==
Creech Jones was the son of a lithographic printer from Bristol. He went to Whitehall Boys' School, and won a scholarship to study French, Mathematics and Commerce for an extra year when he was 13. On leaving school in 1905, he worked in a solicitor's office and prepared for the Civil Service Junior Clerks' Examination. Having passed the exam, he joined the War Office and later worked for the Crown Agents, who acted as the London representatives of British dominions and colonies. He also attended evening classes to improve his education.

In his spare time, Jones was also involved with political groups; he was an active member of the Liberal Christian League, which brought him into contact with senior members of the Liberal Party. His education about politics led him to question, and eventually drop, his membership of the Methodist church. He helped to found the Camberwell Trades and Labour Council in 1913, and later became honorary Secretary of the Dulwich branch of the Independent Labour Party (ILP). After the outbreak of the First World War, Jones was involved across London with the ILP; he had become a pacifist, and organised anti-conscription meetings when conscription was introduced in 1916.

== Imprisonment ==
He was called up that autumn, but refused to participate in any way. As a result, Jones was not granted an exemption from military service and was sent to prison from September 1916, and was not released until April 1919. He used his imprisonment as an opportunity to read further on history, politics and economics; he also made useful contacts in prison with figures who would later become senior in the Labour Party.

== Trade unionist ==
On leaving prison, Creech Jones was unable to resume a civil service career; instead he did research on prisons for the Labour Research Department, a trade union-funded body (it did not have any formal connections with the Labour Party). Later that year he was appointed as Secretary of the National Union of Docks, Wharves and Shipping Staffs, and edited the union journal. When his union became a founding constituent of the Transport and General Workers' Union (TGWU) in 1922, he was promoted to be national secretary of the administrative, clerical and supervisory section. At the 1922 London County Council election he was one of the Labour candidates for Peckham; he was one of the county council's representatives on the Metropolitan Water Board. Additionally, he sat on the London Labour Party executive from 1921 to 1928.

As part of his work for the TGWU, he visited the Ruhr Area to observe the effects of French occupation in 1923—writing a pamphlet about the issue on his return—and helped to train Clements Kadalie of the South African Industrial and Commercial Workers' Union in how to organise a union. Creech Jones wrote a pamphlet, Trade Unionism To-day, which was published by the Workers' Educational Association in 1928. He was heavily involved in the Workers' Educational Association, and also served as a Governor of Ruskin College, Oxford which was funded by the trade unions.

== Travelling ==
At the 1929 general election, he fought the constituency of Heywood and Radcliffe as Labour Party candidate. He left his position at the TGWU after he was elected organising secretary of the Workers' Travel Association (WTA), which funded foreign trips for people employed in industry. He spent a large part of the next decade travelling, writing up his trips in Travel Log, the journal of the WTA. Having visited most European countries, including Nazi Germany, he directed a rescue of hundreds of Jews from Czechoslovakia through the WTA after the Munich Agreement was signed.

After the formation of the National Government, Creech Jones at first went along with his TGWU colleague Ernest Bevin in joining the Socialist League. He was a leading figure in the National I.L.P. Affiliation Committee, which sought to persuade the Independent Labour Party to continue its affiliation to the Labour Party, but when the fight was lost, he resigned from the ILP and joined the Labour Party directly. Initially unwilling to try for a seat in Parliament, it was reported to be his observation of events in Germany which persuaded him to change his mind and at the 1935 general election he won the constituency of Shipley as a Labour Party candidate; his election was helped by the Conservative vote being split between the official candidate and the sitting Member of Parliament (MP), who had been deselected.

== Member of Parliament ==
Creech Jones specialised in Colonial affairs in Parliament, especially those in Africa. In June 1936 he pressed the Government, which were encouraging colonies to set up memorials to King George V, to follow the example of Uganda and set up a technical educational institution. The Labour Party nominated him to the Colonial Office's Educational Advisory Committee in 1936, on which he served for nine years. In 1937, he was a founding member of the Trades Union Congress Colonial Affairs Committee, and in 1940 he founded the Fabian Colonial Bureau.

In 1939, Creech Jones promoted his Private Member's Bill, the Access to Mountains Bill, to Parliament. He had long enjoyed walking in the open countryside, but found private landowners had barred the way; the Bill required mountains and moorland to be opened. Creech Jones organised a conference with those who would be affected by the Bill, at which agreement was reached on amendments to it that would enable their objections to be withdrawn; this compromise enabled the Bill to pass into law.

When Ernest Bevin was appointed Minister of Labour in 1940, he chose Creech Jones as his Parliamentary Private Secretary. He used his influence in the Government to improve conditions for conscientious objectors. As Chairman of the Labour Party's advisory committee on imperial issues, Creech Jones did much to formulate party policy on the colonies prior to the 1945 general election. He was vice-chairman of the Commission on Higher Education for West Africa which was set up in 1943, visiting the West African colonies to compile a well-received report.

== Attlee government ==
After the Labour Party won the 1945 election, Creech Jones was appointed as Parliamentary Under-Secretary of State at the Colonial Office, with The Times wondering why he was not given a more senior post. He was a delegate to the first sitting of the United Nations General Assembly in London in 1946. Creech Jones' support for eventual self-government of the colonies by all their inhabitants was unpopular with those colonies which were run by British settlers, and he had to moderate his speeches when he visited colonies such as Kenya. He also dealt with the British mandate in Palestine in its final years.

In 1948, Jones personally approved of the deployment of mercenaries recruited from the Iban people of Borneo to the Malayan Emergency to fight against pro-independence guerrillas and communists led by the Malayan National Liberation Army. Jones privately declared that these Ibans no longer practised headhunting. However this was untrue as the British Army had promised the Iban mercenaries human scalps and encouraged them to decapitate corpses. Photographs of the practice were later leaked sparking the British Malayan headhunting scandal.

== Colonial Secretary ==
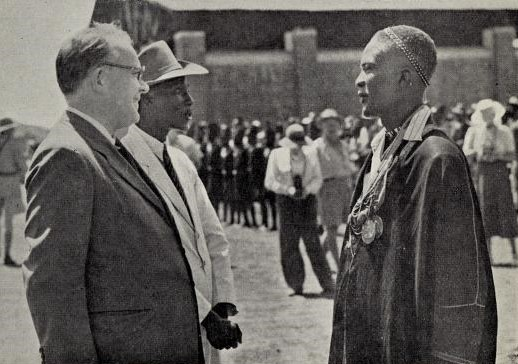
Jones (left) speaking with Paramount Chief Nsefu at Fort Jameson during his 1949 tour of Northern Rhodesia

In October 1946, the Secretary of State for the Colonies George Hall was moved in a government reshuffle and Creech Jones was promoted to head the department, with a seat in the Cabinet and membership of the Privy Council. Creech Jones took over at a time when the tensions in Palestine were increasing, and he frequently appealed to moderate Jewish leaders to restrain the more violent. He was again a delegate to the United Nations during its debate on the subject, and informed the UN of the British government's determination to give up the mandate and withdraw British forces.

In September 1947, Creech Jones chaired the British West Indies conference at Montego Bay discussing closer association and possible federation of the British colonies in the area. The conference produced a preliminary agreement on federation and dominion status. He was later forced to recall Oliver Baldwin as Governor of the Leeward Islands, who had made outspoken comments which local opinion had taken badly.

In Africa, Creech Jones presided over a conference at Lancaster House for the African colonies in 1948. He was able to issue a memorandum on local government in the Colonies, which confirmed the intention to bring in responsible government. He was able to make progress in the colony of Ceylon where he introduced a Government Bill to give the colony Dominion status and eventual independence. He thus presided over the Colonial Office's first granting of independence to a 'non-white' colony. (Independence for India and Pakistan a year earlier had been the responsibility of the India Office.) Internally he reorganised the Colonial Office and its associated civil service to make it more appropriate for the changed role he foresaw for it.

== Defeat ==
At the 1950 general election, Creech Jones' constituency of Shipley was subjected to boundary changes, and he was vigorously challenged by the Conservatives. He ended up losing his seat by a narrow 81 votes to Geoffrey Hirst, being one of the most prominent Ministerial casualties of the election. Out of Parliament he spent more time with the Fabian Colonial Bureau for whom he chaired conferences and lectured. He edited volumes of the Fabian Colonial Essays.

He also tried to get back into Parliament. When Sir Stafford Cripps resigned his seat at Bristol South East in the autumn of 1950, Creech Jones was the favourite to succeed him, given his status and his family connections to the city. However, he lost the selection to Anthony Wedgwood Benn. At the 1951 general election Creech Jones stood in Romford, but was unable to regain the constituency for Labour.

In the early 1950s, Creech Jones succeeded in reconciling Seretse Khama (who had been exiled from Bechuanaland after marrying an Englishwoman) with his uncle Tshekedi, and petitioned the government to rescind the exile order. He also led delegations to the Government from the Anti-Slavery Society (of which he was vice-president) and the Africa Bureau. He was Chairman of the British Council of Pacific Relations from 1952.

== Wakefield MP ==
Creech Jones' opportunity to return to Parliament came in 1954 when Arthur Greenwood, Labour MP for Wakefield, died. He was selected in Greenwood's place, and kept the seat in the by-election. He returned to the Labour front bench, but also retained his involvement in outside work. He was appointed to the governing body of Queen Elizabeth House, a Colonial Office-sponsored institution at Oxford University, in March 1955.

Despite being aged nearly 70, Creech Jones was reappointed to the opposition front bench after the 1959 general election. In 1961, he signed a letter expressing disquiet at a British application to join the European Communities, and urging a Commonwealth conference to discuss the implications before formally applying. He left the front bench in 1963; although hoping to continue in Parliament, he was forced by ill health to announce his retirement in August 1964.

== Death ==
Creech Jones died just eight days after the 1964 general election, at which he was succeeded by Labour's Walter Harrison. Creech Jones was 73 when he died in Lambeth Hospital on 23 October 1964 of Thrombosis.

== Sources ==
- "Arthur Creech Jones" in Oxford Dictionary of National Biography
- Who Was Who, A & C Black
- M. Stenton and S. Lees, Who's Who of British MPs Vol. IV (Harvester Press), 1981

Parliament of the United Kingdom
Preceded by James Lockwood	Member of Parliament for Shipley; 1935–1950	Succeeded by Geoffrey Hirst
Preceded by Arthur Greenwood	Member of Parliament for Wakefield; 1954–1964	Succeeded by Walter Harrison
Political offices
Preceded by The Duke of Devonshire	Under-Secretary of State for the Colonies; 1945–1946	Succeeded by Ivor Thomas
Preceded by George Hall	Secretary of State for the Colonies; 1946–1950	Succeeded by Jim Griffiths
Trade union offices
Preceded by Alfred Short	National Secretary (Administrative, Clerical and Supervisory) of the Transport and General Workers' Union; 1923–1929	Succeeded by R. Goaley
