= New Local =

UK think tank

- Formation: 1996; 30 years ago
- Type: Think tank
- Purpose: Local government reform
- Location: 51.5046°N 0.0890°W
- Region served: United Kingdom
- Chief Executive: Jessica Studdert
- Website: www.newlocal.org.uk

New Local, formerly known as the New Local Government Network, is an independent British think tank and local government network. Founded in 1996, it is based in London, and brings together over 60 councils and other organisations aiming to transform public services and unlock community power.

== Membership ==
New Local's network comprises councils across England of all tiers and with diverse political leadership; and corporate partners.

Network members are united by their appetite for innovation, a willingness to embrace change and passion to simply do things better. Frequent peer-led events give members the opportunity to meet to explore different ways of working and new approaches.

New Local's network also inspires much of its research work, which frequently draws examples and case studies from members.

== Publications ==
- Community Commissioning: Shaping Public Services through People Power
- From Tiny Acorns: Communities Shaping the Future of Children’s Services
- Cultivating Local Inclusive Growth: In Practice
- Communities vs. Coronavirus: The Rise of Mutual Aid
- Think Big, Act Small: Think Big, Act Small: Elinor Ostrom’s radical vision for community power
- This Isn’t Working: reimagining employment support for people facing complex disadvantage
- The Community Paradigm: Why public services need radical change and how it can be achieved

=== The Community Paradigm ===
At the heart of New Local's work is the belief in community power – the idea that people themselves should have more power and resources to shape their own futures. This imagines very different, collaborative ways of working for public services, and a much more decentralised system of governance. Its 2019 publication The Community Paradigm proposed a fundamental shift of power and resources towards the people, places and communities.

This 'paradigm shift' is needed because:

- Public services today face a threat of rising demand. They are struggling to cope with a rapidly aging population, combined with reducing resources.
- Faith in democratic legitimacy and central Government is declining.
- People expect to exercise more control over their day-to-day lives – and can do so using technology.

New Local believes that people and communities themselves have the best insight into their own situation, and public services need to work with and recognise this if they are to be fit for purpose and sustainable into the future.

There are documented instances in the UK and internationally where community-led initiatives operate alongside public services and local government to deliver local services and manage communal spaces .

== People ==
New Local's chief executive is Adam Lent, previously the director of the RSA Action and Research Centre, head of economics and social affairs at the Trades Union Congress and director of research and innovation at Ashoka. Other board members include:

- Donna Hall, Chair of Bolton NHS Trust (Chair)
- Chris Ham, Co-Chair, NHS Assembly
- Claire Kennedy, Managing Director and Co-founder, PPL
- Catherine Mangan, Director, Public Services Academy
- Jacqui McKinlay, Director, Centre for Governance and Scrutiny
- Robert Pollock, Director of Social Finance
- Tony Travers, Director of LSE London

Former directors include Simon Parker and Chris Leslie, former Labour MP for Shipley, between 2005 and his re-election to Parliament for Nottingham East in the general election of 2010. Dan Corry was director between 2002 and 2005.

== See also ==
- List of think tanks in the United Kingdom
- Local government in England
