= 1915 Shipley by-election =

UK Parliamentary by-election

The 1915 Shipley by-election was held on 9 February 1915. The by-election was held due to the death of the incumbent Liberal MP, Percy Illingworth. It was won by the Liberal candidate Oswald Partington, who was unopposed. Under an agreement between the parties vacant seats were to be uncontested for the duration of the conflict, with only a candidate of the party holding the seat being nominated. Partington stood down at the next general election in 1918.
