= 1930 Shipley by-election =

UK parliamentary by-election

The 1930 Shipley by-election was a parliamentary by-election for the British House of Commons constituency of Shipley on 6 November 1930.

== Vacancy ==
The by-election was caused by the death of the sitting Labour MP, William Mackinder on 8 September 1930. He had been MP here since winning the seat from the Liberal Party in 1923.

== Election history ==
The result at the last General election was

1929 general election Electorate 51,838
Party	Candidate	Votes	%	±%
Labour	William Mackinder	18,654	42.3	+6.3
Unionist	Robert Clough	13,693	31.1	−3.1
Liberal	Francis Wrigley Hirst	11,712	26.6	−3.2
Majority		4,961	11.2	+9.4
Turnout		44,059	85.0	−1.4
Labour hold		Swing	+4.7	

== Candidates ==
The constituency Labour Party selected as their candidate to defend the seat William Albert Robinson from Liverpool. He had contested Liverpool Exchange at the 1929 general election. He was the political secretary of the National Union of Distributive and Allied Workers. The local Conservative Association chose as their candidate, 42-year-old James Horace Lockwood. He was a strong advocate of safeguarding for the textile industry. He had not stood for parliament before. The local Liberals put forward as their candidate, Arthur Davy. He had contested Shipley for the Liberal Party at the 1922 general election when he polled 22% of the vote, finishing third behind the victorious National Liberal candidate. The Communist Party decided to intervene in the election and fielded 49-year-old Willie Gallacher from Scotland. He had previously stood at Dundee in 1922 and 1923 and West Fife in 1929.

== Campaign ==
Polling day was set for 6 November 1930, nearly two months after the death of the previous MP, allowing for an unusually long campaign.

== Result ==
The Conservative Party, which had never before won Shipley, gained the seat from Labour;

Shipley by-election, 1930 Electorate 52,856
Party	Candidate	Votes	%	±%
Conservative	James Lockwood	15,238	36.0	+4.9
Labour	William Albert Robinson	13,537	32.1	−10.2
Liberal	Arthur Davy	12,785	30.2	+3.6
Communist	Willie Gallacher	701	1.7	New
Majority		1,665	3.9	N/A
Turnout		42,261	80.0	−5.0
Conservative gain from Labour		Swing	+7.5	

== Aftermath ==
Lockwood was re-elected at the 1931 general election, but the local Conservative Association did not re-adopt him as their candidate for the 1935 election. He stood instead as an Independent Conservative, but lost his seat, finishing last of 4 candidates with only 13.5% of the votes. Robinson challenged again in 1931 before being elected for St Helens in 1935. Gallacher returned to Scotland and was eventually elected to represent West Fife in 1935. Davy did not stand again. The result at the following General election;

1931 general election Electorate
Party	Candidate	Votes	%	±%
Conservative	James Lockwood	27,304	64.0	+32.9
Labour	William Albert Robinson	14,725	34.5	−7.8
New Party	W.J. Leaper	601	1.4	N/A
Majority		12,579	29.5	+18.3
Turnout		42,630	79.7	−5.3
Conservative hold		Swing		

== See also ==
- List of United Kingdom by-elections
- United Kingdom by-election records
