= Percy Illingworth =

British Liberal politician & rugby union player

The Right Honourable Percy Illingworth

Government Chief Whip in the House of Commons; Parliamentary Secretary to the Treasury
- In office 7 August 1912 – 3 January 1915
- Monarch: George V
- Prime Minister: H. H. Asquith
- Preceded by: Alexander Murray
- Succeeded by: John Gulland

Lords Commissioner of the Treasury
- In office 7 March 1910 – 7 August 1912
- Prime Minister: H. H. Asquith

Member of Parliament for Shipley
- In office 8 February 1906 – 3 January 1915
- Preceded by: James Fortescue Flannery
- Succeeded by: Oswald Partington

Personal details
- Born: Percy Holden Illingworth; 19 March 1869 Bradford, Yorkshire, UK
- Died: 3 January 1915 (aged 45) Paddington, London, UK
- Party: Liberal
- Spouse: Mary Mackenzie Coats (m. 1907)
- Relations: Albert Illingworth, 1st Baron Illingworth (brother)
- Children: 3
- Parents: Henry Illingworth (father); Mary Holden (mother)
- Education: Jesus College, Cambridge

Percy Holden Illingworth (19 March 1869 – 3 January 1915) was a British Liberal politician. He served as Parliamentary Secretary to the Treasury under H. H. Asquith between 1912 and 1915.

== Background and education ==
Illingworth was the third and youngest son of Henry Illingworth, of Bradford, a member of an old Yorkshire family, and his wife Mary, daughter of Sir Isaac Holden, 1st Baronet. Albert Illingworth, 1st Baron Illingworth, was his elder brother. He was educated at Jesus College, Cambridge, where he played rugby for the university, winning two sporting 'Blues' in The Varsity Matches of 1889 and 1890. He was called to the Bar, Inner Temple, in 1894. He later served in the Second Boer War.

== Political career ==
In 1906 Illingworth was returned to Parliament for Shipley, and served as Parliamentary Private Secretary to the Chief Secretary for Ireland (James Bryce and Augustine Birrell respectively) from 1906 to 1910. From February 1910 to April 1912, he was a Junior Lord of the Treasury under H. H. Asquith. In 1912 Asquith appointed him Parliamentary Secretary to the Treasury, a post he held until his sudden death in early 1915. He had been nominated to the Privy Council but died before he could be sworn in.

== Family ==
Illingworth married Mary Mackenzie Coats (b. 1883), daughter of George Coats, of Staneley, Renfrewshire, on 16 January 1907, at Paisley. They had three sons.

- Henry George Coats Illingworth (1908–1993), married Violet Dawn Gold, daughter of Sir Harcourt Gilbey Gold. had issue:
  - Mary Dawn Mackenzie Illingworth, married Ian Ogilvie-Grant, 13th Earl of Seafield.
  - James Henry Harcourt Illingworth, married his sister-in-law Lady Pauline Anne Ogilvie-Grant.

He died suddenly in January 1915 of typhoid fever.

Parliament of the United Kingdom
Preceded by Sir James Fortescue Flannery, Bt	Member of Parliament for Shipley; 1906–1915	Succeeded by Oswald Partington
Political offices
Preceded by The Master of Elibank	Government Chief Whip in the House of Commons; Parliamentary Secretary to the Treasury; 1912–1915	Succeeded by John Gulland
Party political offices
Preceded by The Master of Elibank	Liberal Chief Whip; 1912–1915	Succeeded by John Gulland
