= 1922 Committee =

UK Conservative parliamentary group

- Formation: April 1923; 103 years ago
- Location: Palace of Westminster, London, United Kingdom
- Chairman: Bob Blackman

The 1922 Committee, formally known as the Conservative Private Members' Committee, or informally as the 22, is a parliamentary group of the Conservative Party in the British House of Commons. The committee, consisting of all Conservative backbench Members of Parliament (MPs), meets weekly while Parliament is in session and provides a way for backbenchers to co-ordinate and discuss their views independently of frontbenchers. Its executive membership and officers are by consensus limited to backbench MPs; however, since 2010, frontbench Conservative MPs have an open invitation to attend meetings.

The committee can also play an important role in choosing the party leader. The group was formed in 1923 by MPs who were elected in 1922, and became more influential after 1940. The committee, collectively, represents the views of the Conservative Party parliamentary rank and file to the party leader, who is usually also the Prime Minister or leader of the Opposition. Whips are present but their role is limited to announcing future business and reporting questions and complaints to the chief whip. Due to the number of members, the group traditionally meets in Committee Room 14, the largest committee room in the Houses of Parliament.

== Committee constitutional matters ==
The 1922 Committee has an 18-member executive committee, whose members are elected by all Conservative MPs except those who are members of the Government, i.e. the electorate comprises all "backbench" Conservative MPs. Candidates need to be nominated by two Conservative colleagues, and it is a first-past-the-post voting system, meaning the person with the most votes in each category wins.

The committee oversees the election of party leaders, or any Conservative party-led vote of confidence in a current leader. Such a vote can be triggered by 15% of Conservative MPs (currently 19 MPs out of the 121 sitting Conservative MPs as of July 2024) writing a letter to the chairman of the committee asking for such a vote. This process was used most recently on 6 June 2022, against Boris Johnson. The last time a leader lost such a vote was on 29 October 2003, when Iain Duncan Smith was defeated by 90 to 75. However both May and Johnson chose to resign within a year of their confidence votes.

List of votes of confidence
Date	Leader	Votes	
Date	Leader	Confidence	No confidence
29 October 2003	Iain Duncan Smith	75	90
12 December 2018	Theresa May	200	117
6 June 2022	Boris Johnson	211	148

== History ==
The name does not, as is sometimes wrongly supposed, stem from the 19 October 1922 Carlton Club meeting, in which Conservative MPs successfully demanded that the party withdraw from the coalition government of David Lloyd George, and which triggered the 1922 general election. The committee was formed following the election, in April 1923.

The MPs who founded the committee were not the same as those who had taken the decision to end the 1916–1922 coalition government. It began as a small dining group of new members elected in 1922. The committee soon developed into a ginger group of active backbenchers. After the 1923 and 1924 elections, the membership expanded as more new Conservative MPs were elected, and in 1926 all backbench MPs were invited to become members. It became known as the Conservative Private Members' Committee. Consequently, it became a platform for the majority rather than a focus for discontent.

In 1990, the committee participated in the ousting of Margaret Thatcher. The term "men in grey suits", meaning a delegation of Conservative MPs who tell a party leader that it is time for them to step down without forcing an open challenge, is often used in reference to members of the 1922 Committee.

On 19 May 2010, shortly after the Conservatives had formed a coalition government with the Liberal Democrats, Prime Minister David Cameron suggested altering the committee to involve frontbench ministers in the recommendation forming process, angering some backbench MPs. On 20 May 2010, committee members voted to approve the change, with 168 votes in favour and 118 against. Many backbench party members criticised the move and voted against it, while ministers had argued such a change would be necessary to continue operating coherently as a party during its membership of a coalition government. Following the election of Graham Brady as chairman the following week, it was clarified that although frontbenchers became eligible to attend meetings of the committee, only backbenchers would be able to vote for its officers and executive committee.

On 7 March 2023, Brady announced that he would not seek re-election at the 2024 general election. The Committee was left with two remaining members after the general election, who were the only two Conservative Party MPs to stand. They were Bob Blackman, the MP for Harrow East, who increased his majority in the election despite a national Labour landslide, and Sir Geoffrey Clifton-Brown, the MP for the newly formed constituency of North Cotswolds, who has been an MP since 1992. Blackman won the contest by a 61 votes to 37 with 98 votes cast.

== The 2024 committee election ==
The latest election for the Chair of the 1922 Committee was held on July 9, 2024. The former chair, Graham Brady, had stood down as an MP in the 2024 general election, creating a vacancy. Bob Blackman and Geoffrey Clifton-Brown stood as candidates, with Blackman winning the election with 61 out of 121 possible votes.

Media reports showed that several members were unable to vote, due to a misunderstanding of the closing time of the vote. This included senior Conservatives such as Mark Francois, Jeremy Hunt and Edward Leigh. In total, only 98 out of 121 MPs turned out (81%). However, with Blackman winning an absolute majority of Conservative MPs, the remaining 23 MPs would not have affected the outcome.

The results of the election were as follows:

Election of chair of the 1922 committee
Bob Blackman	61 / 121 (50%)
Geoffrey Clifton-Brown	37 / 121 (31%)

Following the vote for the Chair, there were subsequent votes to elect the 1922 Executive board. One MP with nominations was left off the ballot paper, leading to calls to re-run the vote.

== Executive committee ==
=== Since 2024 ===
- Chairman: Bob Blackman
- Vice-Chairman: Martin Vickers
- Treasurer: Geoffrey Clifton-Brown
- Executive members:
  - Harriett Baldwin
  - Sarah Bool
  - Mark Garnier
  - Bernard Jenkin
  - Alan Mak
  - Jack Rankin
  - Andrew Rosindell
  - Alec Shelbrooke
  - Gregory Stafford
  - John Whittingdale

=== Until 2024 ===
As of 11 July 2022, the executive committee comprised:

- Chairman: Graham Brady
- Vice-Chairman: Nus Ghani
- Treasurer: Geoffrey Clifton-Brown
- Joint Executive secretaries:
  - Bob Blackman
  - Gary Sambrook
- Executive members:
  - Aaron Bell
  - Miriam Cates
  - Jo Gideon
  - Richard Graham
  - Chris Green
  - Robert Halfon
  - Sally-Ann Hart
  - Andrew Jones
  - Tom Randall
  - David Simmonds
  - John Stevenson
  - Martin Vickers

== Historical list of officials ==
=== Chairmen ===
- Gervais Rentoul (1923–1932)
- William Morrison (1932–1935)
- Hugh O'Neill (1935–1939)
- Patrick Spens (1939–1940)
- Alexander Erskine-Hill (1940–1944)
- John McEwen (1944–1945)
- Arnold Gridley (1946–1951)
- Derek Walker-Smith (1951–1955)
- John Morrison (1955–1964)
- William Anstruther-Gray (1964–1966)
- Arthur Vere Harvey (1966–1970)
- Harry Legge-Bourke (1970–1972)
- Edward du Cann (1972–1984)
- Cranley Onslow (1984–1992)
- Marcus Fox (1992–1997)
- Archie Hamilton (1997–2001)
- Michael Spicer (2001–2010)
- Graham Brady (2010–2024)
- Bob Blackman (2024–present)

=== Secretaries ===
- Victor Goodhew (1979–1983)
- Jill Knight (1983–1987)
