= Electoral history of Robert Byrd =

Elections featuring American politician

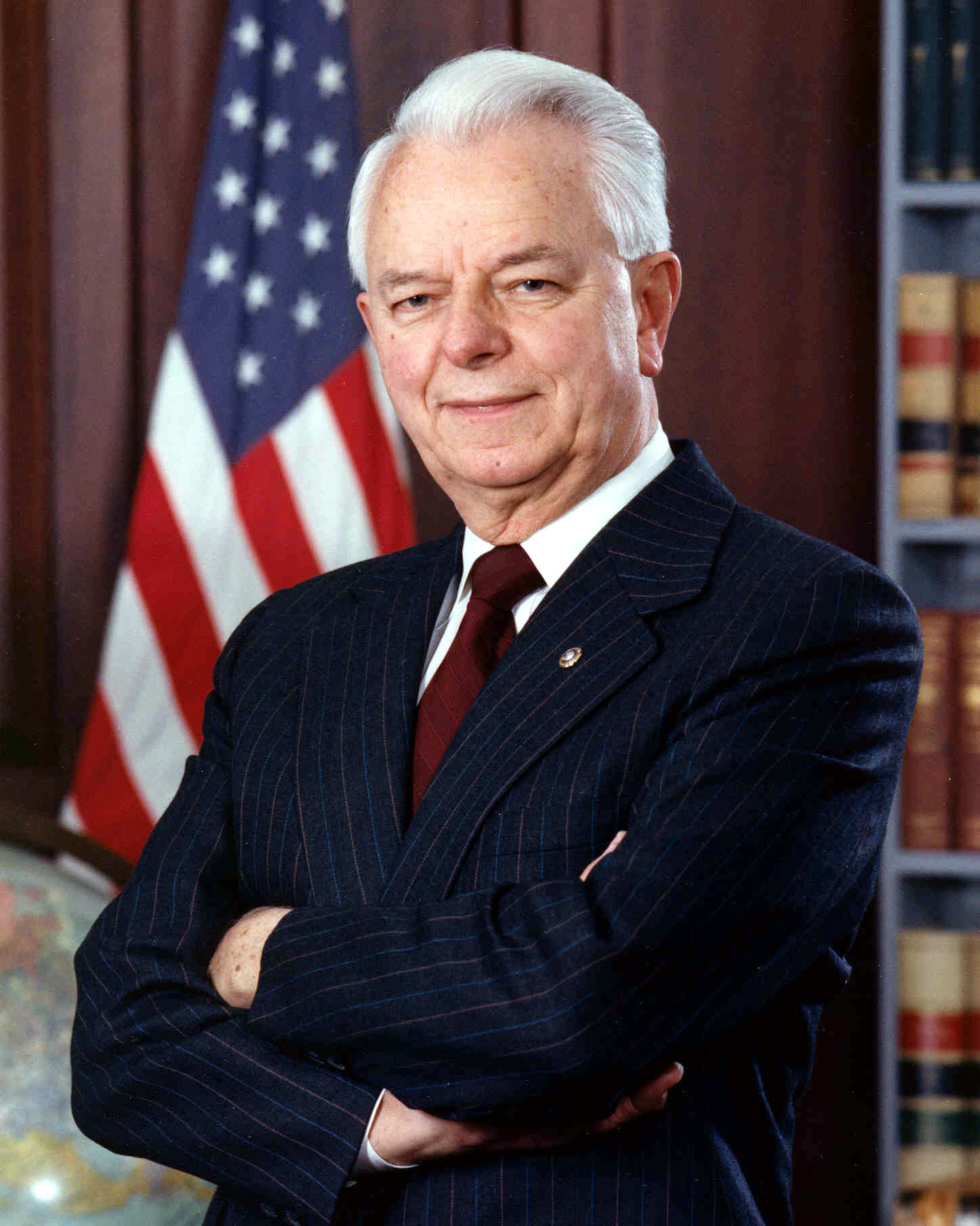
Senator Robert Byrd (D-WV)

Electoral history of Robert Byrd, senior United States senator from West Virginia (1959–2010), president pro tempore of the United States Senate (1989–1995, 2001, 2001–2003 and 2007–2010), Senate majority (1977–1981, 1987–1989) and minority leader (1981–1987). He was also the longest-serving U.S. senator in history and the longest-serving member of Congress at the time.

== Almanac ==
United States Congressional District
Years	Congress	Chamber	House Majority	President	District
1953-1955	83rd	U.S. House	Republican	Dwight D. Eisenhower	District 6
1955-1957	84th	U.S. House	Democratic	Dwight D. Eisenhower	District 6
1957-1959	85th	U.S. House	Democratic	Dwight D. Eisenhower	District 6
Years	Congress	Chamber	Senate Majority	Senate Vice President	Constituency
1959-1961	86th	U.S. Senate	Democratic	Richard Nixon	West Virginia
1961-1963	87th	U.S. Senate	Democratic	Lyndon B. Johnson	West Virginia
1963-1965	88th	U.S. Senate	Democratic	Lyndon B. Johnson (until November 22, 1963) Vacant (from November 22, 1963)	West Virginia
1965-1967	89th	U.S. Senate	Democratic	Vacant (until January 20, 1965) Hubert Humphrey (from January 20, 1965)	West Virginia
1967-1969	90th	U.S. Senate	Democratic	Hubert Humphrey	West Virginia
1969-1971	91st	U.S. Senate	Democratic	Spiro Agnew	West Virginia
1971-1973	92nd	U.S. Senate	Democratic	Spiro Agnew	West Virginia
1973-1975	93rd	U.S. Senate	Democratic	Spiro Agnew (until October 10, 1973) Vacant (October 10 - December 6, 1973) Gerald Ford (December 6, 1973 - August 9, 1974) Vacant (August 9 - December 19, 1974) Nelson Rockefeller(from December 19, 1974)	West Virginia
1975-1977	94th	U.S. Senate	Democratic	Nelson Rockefeller	West Virginia
1977-1979	95th	U.S. Senate	Democratic	Walter Mondale	West Virginia
1979-1981	96th	U.S. Senate	Democratic	Walter Mondale	West Virginia
1981-1983	97th	U.S. Senate	Republican	George H. W. Bush	West Virginia
1983-1985	98th	U.S. Senate	Republican	George H. W. Bush	West Virginia
1985-1987	99th	U.S. Senate	Republican	George H. W. Bush	West Virginia
1987-1989	100th	U.S. Senate	Democratic	George H. W. Bush	West Virginia
1989-1991	101st	U.S. Senate	Democratic	Dan Quayle	West Virginia
1991-1993	102nd	U.S. Senate	Democratic	Dan Quayle	West Virginia
1993-1995	103rd	U.S. Senate	Democratic	Al Gore	West Virginia
1995-1997	104th	U.S. Senate	Republican	Al Gore	West Virginia
1997-1999	105th	U.S. Senate	Republican	Al Gore	West Virginia
1999-2001	106th	U.S. Senate	Republican	Al Gore	West Virginia
2001-2003	107th	U.S. Senate	Democratic (until January 20, 2001) Republican (with tie-breaking VP) (January 20, 2001 – June 6, 2001) Democratic (through caucus) (from June 6, 2001)	Dick Cheney	West Virginia
2003-2005	108th	U.S. Senate	Republican	Dick Cheney	West Virginia
2005-2007	109th	U.S. Senate	Republican	Dick Cheney	West Virginia
2007-2009	110th	U.S. Senate	Democratic	Dick Cheney	West Virginia
2009-2010	111th	U.S. Senate	Democratic	Joe Biden	West Virginia

== U.S. House elections ==
West Virginia's 6th congressional district, 1952:

- Robert Byrd (D) - 104,387 (55.58%)
- Latelle M. LaFollette Jr. (R) - 83,439 (44.42%)

West Virginia's 6th congressional district, 1954:

- Robert Byrd (D) (inc.) - 73,535 (62.73%)
- Pat B. Withrow, Jr. (R) - 43,685 (37.27%)

West Virginia's 6th congressional district, 1956:

- Robert Byrd (D) (inc.) - 99,854 (57.40%)
- Cleo S. Jones (R) - 74,110 (42.60%)

== U.S. Senate elections ==
1958 U.S. Senate election in West Virginia
Party	Candidate	Votes	%
Democratic	Robert Byrd	381,745	59.19
Republican	Chapman Revercomb	263,172	40.81
Total votes		644,917	100.00
Democratic hold			

1964 U.S. Senate election in West Virginia
Party	Candidate	Votes	%
Democratic	Robert Byrd (incumbent)	515,015	67.67
Republican	Cooper P. Benedict	246,072	32.33
Total votes		761,087	100.00
Democratic hold			

1970 U.S. Senate election in West Virginia
Primary election
Party	Candidate	Votes	%
Democratic	Robert Byrd (incumbent)	391,450	88.96
Democratic	John J. McOwen	24,286	11.04
Total votes		415,736	100.00
General election
Democratic	Robert Byrd (incumbent)	345,965	77.64
Republican	Elmer Dodson	99,658	22.36
Total votes		445,623	100.00
Democratic hold			

1976 U.S. Senate election in West Virginia
Party	Candidate	Votes	%
Democratic	Robert Byrd	566,359	100.00
Total votes		566,359	100.00
Democratic hold			

1982 U.S. Senate election in West Virginia
Party	Candidate	Votes	%
Democratic	Robert Byrd (incumbent)	387,170	68.49
Republican	Cleve Benedict	173,910	30.76
Socialist Workers	William B. Howland	4,234	0.75
Total votes		565,314	100.00
Democratic hold			

1988 U.S. Senate election in West Virginia
Primary election
Party	Candidate	Votes	%
Democratic	Robert Byrd	252,767	80.77
Democratic	Bob Myers	60,186	19.23
Total votes		565,314	100.00
General election
Democratic	Robert Byrd (incumbent)	410,983	64.77
Republican	Jay Wolfe	223,564	35.23
Total votes		634,547	100.00
Democratic hold			

1994 U.S. Senate election in West Virginia
Primary election
Party	Candidate	Votes	%
Democratic	Robert Byrd (incumbent)	190,061	85.42
Democratic	James M. Fuller	20,057	9.01
Democratic	Paul Nuchims	12,381	5.57
Total votes		222,499	100.00
General election
Democratic	Robert Byrd (incumbent)	290,495	69.01
Republican	Stan Klos	130,441	30.99
Total votes		420,936	100.00

2000 U.S. Senate election in West Virginia
Party	Candidate	Votes	%
Democratic	Robert Byrd (incumbent)	469,215	77.75
Republican	David T. Gallaher	121,635	20.16
Libertarian	Joe Whelan	12,627	2.09
Total votes		603,477	100.00

2006 U.S. Senate election in West Virginia
Primary election
Party	Candidate	Votes	%
Democratic	Robert Byrd (incumbent)	159,154	85.68
Democratic	Billy Hendricks Jr.	26,609	14.32
Total votes		185,763	100.00
General election
Democratic	Robert Byrd (incumbent)	291,058	64.41
Republican	John Raese	152,315	33.70
Mountain	Jesse Johnson	8,522	1.89
Total votes		451,895	100.00

== Pro tempore elections ==
President pro tempore of the United States Senate, 1989:

- Robert Byrd (D) - 55 (55.00%)
- Strom Thurmond - 45 (45.00%)

President pro tempore of the United States Senate, 1991:

- Robert Byrd (D) (inc.) - 56 (56.00%)
- Strom Thurmond (R) - 44 (44.00%)

President pro tempore of the United States Senate, 1993:

- Robert Byrd (D) (inc.) - 57 (57.00%)
- Strom Thurmond (R) - 43 (43.00%)

President pro tempore of the United States Senate, 1995:

- Strom Thurmond (R) - 52 (52.00%)
- Robert Byrd (D) (inc.) - 48 (48.00%)

President pro tempore of the United States Senate, 1997:

- Strom Thurmond (R) (inc.) - 55 (55.00%)
- Robert Byrd - 45 (45.00%)

President pro tempore of the United States Senate, 1999:

- Strom Thurmond (R) (inc.) - 55 (55.00%)
- Robert Byrd - 45 (45.00%)

President pro tempore of the United States Senate, January 3, 2001:

- Robert Byrd (D) - 51 (50.50%)
- Strom Thurmond (R) (inc.) - 50 (49.51%)

Vice President Al Gore cast tie-breaking vote

President pro tempore of the United States Senate, January 20, 2001:

- Strom Thurmond (R) - 51 (50.50%)
- Robert Byrd (D) (inc.) - 50 (49.51%)

Vice President Dick Cheney cast tie-breaking vote

President pro tempore of the United States Senate, June 6, 2001:

- Robert Byrd (D) - 51 (51.00%)
- Strom Thurmond (R) (inc.) - 49 (49.00%)

President pro tempore of the United States Senate, 2003:

- Ted Stevens (R) - 51 (51.00%)
- Robert Byrd (D) (inc.) - 49 (49.00%)

President pro tempore of the United States Senate, 2005:

- Ted Stevens (R) (inc.) - 55 (55.00%)
- Robert Byrd - 45 (45.00%)

President pro tempore of the United States Senate, 2007:

- Robert Byrd (D) - 51 (51.00%)
- Ted Stevens (R) (inc.) - 49 (49.00%)

President pro tempore of the United States Senate, 2009:

- Robert Byrd (D) (inc.) - 58 (58.59%)
- Richard Lugar (R) - 41 (41.41%)

== Presidential elections ==
West Virginia Democratic Presidential primary, 1976:

- Robert Byrd - 331,639 (89.01%)
- George Wallace - 40,938 (10.99%)

Florida Democratic Presidential primary, 1976:

- Jimmy Carter - 448,844 (34.52%)
- George Wallace - 396,820 (30.52%)
- Henry M. Jackson - 310,944 (23.91%)
- None of Names Shown - 37,626 (2.89%)
- Milton Shapp - 32,198 (2.48%)
- Mo Udall - 27,235 (2.09%)
- Birch Bayh - 8,750 (0.67%)
- Arthur O. Blessitt - 7,889 (0.61%)
- Ellen McCormack - 7,595 (0.58%)
- Sargent Shriver - 7,084 (0.55%)
- Fred R. Harris - 5,397 (0.42%)
- Robert Byrd - 5,042 (0.39%)
- Frank Church - 4,906 (0.38%)

Georgia Democratic Presidential primary, 1976:

- Jimmy Carter - 419,272 (83.44%)
- George Wallace - 57,594 (11.46%)
- Mo Udall - 9,755 (1.94%)
- Robert Byrd - 3,628 (0.72%)
- Henry M. Jackson - 3,358 (0.67%)
- Frank Church - 2,477 (0.49%)
- Frank Joseph Ahern - 1,487 (0.30%)
- Sargent Shriver - 1,378 (0.27%)
- Birch Bayh - 824 (0.16%)
- Fred R. Harris - 699 (0.14%)
- Ellen McCormack - 635 (0.13%)
- Abram Eisenman - 351 (0.07%)
- Lloyd Bentsen - 277 (0.06%)
- Frank Bona - 263 (0.05%)
- Milton Shapp - 181 (0.04%)
- George Roden - 153 (0.03%)
- Bob Kelleher - 139 (0.03%)

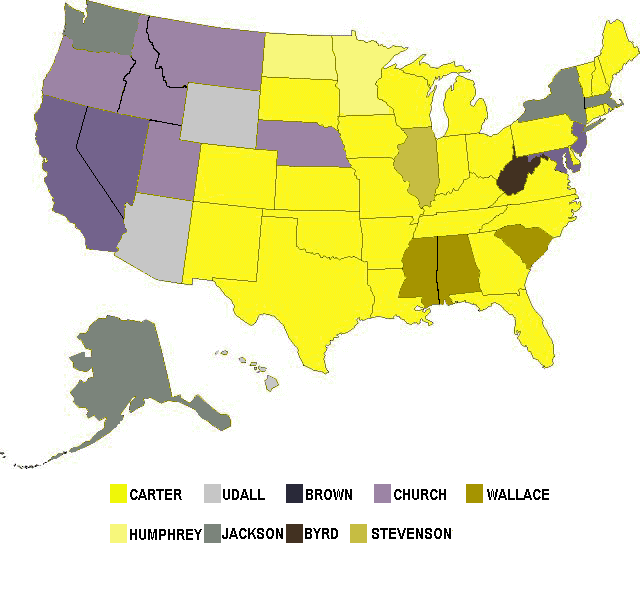
1976 Democratic Presidential primaries results by state

1976 Democratic Presidential primaries:

- Jimmy Carter - 6,235,609 (39.19%)
- Jerry Brown - 2,449,374 (15.39%)
- George Wallace - 1,955,388 (12.29%)
- Mo Udall - 1,611,754 (10.13%)
- Henry M. Jackson - 1,134,375 (7.13%)
- Frank Church - 830,818 (5.22%)
- Robert Byrd - 340,309 (2.14%)
- Sargent Shriver - 304,399 (1.91%)
- Unpledged delegates - 283,437 (1.78%)
- Ellen McCormack - 238,027 (1.50%)
- Fred R. Harris - 234,568 (1.47%)
- Milton Shapp - 88,254 (0.56%)
- Birch Bayh - 86,438 (0.54%)
- Hubert Humphrey - 61,992 (0.39%)
- Ted Kennedy - 19,805 (0.12%)
- Arthur O. Blessitt - 8,717 (0.06%)
- Lloyd Bentsen - 4,046 (0.03%)

1976 Democratic National Convention (Presidential tally):

- Jimmy Carter - 2,239 (74.48%)
- Mo Udall - 330 (10.98%)
- Jerry Brown - 301 (10.01%)
- George Wallace - 57 (1.90%)
- Ellen McCormack - 22 (0.73%)
- Frank Church - 19 (0.63%)
- Hubert Humphrey - 10 (0.33%)
- Henry M. Jackson - 10 (0.33%)
- Fred R. Harris - 9 (0.30%)
- Milton Shapp - 2 (0.07%)
- Robert Byrd, Cesar Chavez, Leon Jaworski, Barbara Jordan, Ted Kennedy, Jennings Randolph, Fred Stover - each 1 vote (0.03%)

1980 Democratic National Convention (Presidential tally):

- Jimmy Carter (inc.) - 2,123 (64.04%)
- Ted Kennedy - 1,151 (34.72%)
- William Proxmire - 10 (0.30%)
- Koryne Kaneski Horbal - 5 (0.15%)
- Scott M. Matheson, Sr. - 5 (0.15%)
- Ron Dellums - 3 (0.09%)
- Robert Byrd - 2 (0.06%)
- John Culver - 2 (0.06%)
- Kent Hance - 2 (0.06%)
- Jennings Randolph - 2 (0.06%)
- Warren Spannaus - 2 (0.06%)
- Alice Tripp - 2 (0.06%)
- Jerry Brown - 1 (0.03%)
- Dale Bumpers - 1 (0.03%)
- Hugh L. Carey - 1 (0.03%)
- Walter Mondale - 1 (0.03%)
- Edmund Muskie - 1 (0.03%)
- Thomas J. Steed - 1 (0.03%)
