= John Cliff (trade unionist) =

John Cliff DL

Deputy Chairman, London Transport Executive
- In office 1948–1955

Assistant General Secretary, Transport and General Workers' Union
- In office 1924–1935

Personal details
- Born: 7 March 1883 Leeds, West Riding of Yorkshire, England
- Died: 18 October 1977 (aged 94) Eastbourne, Sussex, England
- Occupation: Tram conductor and motorman, trade unionist

John Cliff DL (7 March 1883 – 18 October 1977) was a tram conductor and motorman, and an active trade unionist. He played a significant role in negotiations to improve pay and working conditions in the tram industry as well as the wider public transport sector. He was the first assistant general secretary of the Transport and General Workers' Union. He later served on several transport-related bodies, notably the London Passenger Transport Board and its successor, the London Transport Executive. He was also a member of the London County Council.

== Early life and career ==
Cliff was born in Leeds, the son of John Cliff and his wife Mary. At the age of 17, he joined Leeds Corporation Transport Department, serving first as a tram conductor and later as a motorman (driver).

== Union activities ==
Early in his career, Cliff became active in trade union affairs. He joined the Amalgamated Association of Tramway and Vehicle Workers and later became the chairman of its Leeds branch and a member of its national executive council. He played a prominent role in national negotiations for a 48-hour week for tram workers, an "equal pay for equal work" agreement and the setting up of a national enquiry into tram workers' pay and conditions.

In 1919, the union merged with the London and Provincial Union of Licensed Vehicle Workers to form the United Vehicle Workers. Cliff was appointed the secretary of its passenger services national trade group, representing workers in the public transport sector throughout the country. In the same year, he was appointed joint secretary of the newly-formed Joint Industrial Council for the Tramways Industry of England and Wales.

In 1922, the United Vehicle Workers was one of fourteen unions (with a combined membership of 350,000) that merged to form the Transport and General Workers' Union (TGWU), with Ernest Bevin as its first general secretary. Cliff was appointed national secretary of its passenger transport group. In 1924, he became the union's assistant general secretary and Bevin's deputy.

== Public service ==
In 1924, the London and Home Counties Traffic Advisory Committee was set up to advise the Minister of Transport on issues concerning traffic and transport in the London Traffic Area. Cliff was appointed to the committee, initially for a five-year term, and was appointed for a further term in 1928, being one of three members appointed to serve "in the interests of labour".

In 1929, he left Britain for a six-month visit to India, where he served on the Royal Commission on Labour Conditions in India. The commission's brief was to report on the health, efficiency and standard of living of workers in industrial undertakings and plantations in British India. It issued its report in 1931.

In 1933, the London Passenger Transport Board was created to take charge of public transport throughout the London area. Cliff joined the board, initially on a part-time basis. From 1935, he served full time, with responsibility for staff welfare and health. From 1948, he continued as a member of the successor body, the London Transport Executive, where he served as deputy chairman, a post he held until his retirement in 1955.

Cliff was also a member of London County Council for many years, being elected alderman in 1937 and chairman in 1946. He was a deputy lieutenant of Middlesex from 1949. He was also a founder member of the British Institute of Management (now the Chartered Management Institute).

In July 1952, Cliff drove the last London tram into New Cross Depot.

== Personal life and death ==
Cliff married Sarah Ann Scott in 1906.

He died at Eastbourne in October 1977.

== Footnotes ==
Trade union offices
Preceded by New position	National Secretary of the Passengers Services Group of the Transport and General Workers' Union; 1922–1925	Succeeded by Harold Clay
Preceded by New position	Assistant General Secretary of the Transport and General Workers' Union; 1924–1935	Succeeded by Arthur Deakin
Civic offices
Preceded by Charles Robertson	Chairman of the London County Council; 1946–1947	Succeeded by Eleanor Nathan
