= Tom McLean (trade unionist) =

Tom McLean (1877 or 1878 – 1957) was a trade unionist and political activist.

Living in Rochdale, McLean first joined a trade union in 1902. In 1909, he became a tram conductor, and he joined the Amalgamated Association of Tramway and Vehicle Workers, soon winning election to its national executive. He joined the Labour Party in 1909, and in 1913 became a full-time officer of the trade union. He also became involved in the Rochdale Trades and Labour Council, serving on its executive for five years.

In 1919, McLean was elected as president of the Tramwaymen. During the year, the union merged into the United Vehicle Workers, which appointed him as its Lancashire organiser. In 1922, the union took part in a further merger, which formed the Transport and General Workers' Union, and McLean became an Area Passenger Transport Group Secretary, remaining in the post until he retired in 1942. He spent much of this period on the Joint Industrial Council for the industry, which he chaired for three years.

McLean stood repeatedly for Rochdale Borough Council, but was never elected. At the 1931 UK general election, he stood in Liverpool Exchange, taking over 10,000 votes, and then at the 1935 UK general election he stood in Heywood and Radcliffe, managing 39.5% of the vote, but was not elected.

Trade union offices
Preceded by Ernest Bowden	President of the Amalgamated Association of Tramway and Vehicle Workers; 1919	Succeeded by Union merged
