= Harold Clay =

British trade union leader (1886–1961)

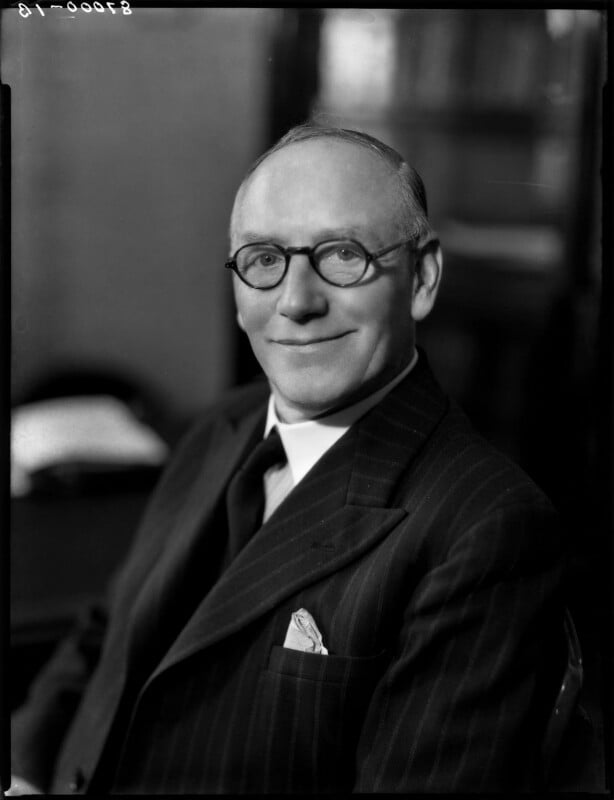
Clay in 1940

Harold Ewart Clay (1886 – September 1961) was a British trade union leader, also known for his political and educational activities.

Born in Leeds, Clay worked as a tram driver. He became active in the Social Democratic Federation, then its successor, the British Socialist Party, and was a keen advocate of the BSP's affiliation to the Labour Party, serving as president of the Leeds Labour Representation Council in 1913/14. In 1914, he founded the Leeds Tenants Defence League, which led an unsuccessful rent strike in support of the construction of municipal housing.

Clay was prominent in the United Vehicle Workers union, presiding over its conference in 1913. In 1922, it merged into the new Transport and General Workers' Union (TGWU), and Clay then served as the TGWU's first area secretary for Yorkshire. A supporter of the Workers' Educational Association (WEA), he was appointed as a vice president in 1928. Around this time, he relocated to London, and was chairman of the London Labour Party from 1933 until 1948. During this period, he was active in the Socialist League; he and Arthur Pugh were the only two prominent trade unionists to maintain activity with the group.

In 1940, Arthur Deakin, Assistant General Secretary of the TGWU, became its acting General Secretary, and Clay was appointed to fill his post. Three years later, he became president of the WEA, serving for fifteen years. In 1958, he stood down from his union and political posts, taking a post on the Road Transport Executive.

Trade union offices
Preceded by John Cliff	National Secretary of the Passengers Services Group of the Transport and General Workers' Union; 1925–1946	Succeeded by Sam Henderson
Preceded by Arthur Deakin	Assistant General Secretary of the Transport and General Workers' Union; 1940–1948	Succeeded by Jock Tiffin
Party political offices
Preceded by Thomas Naylor	Chairman of the London Labour Party; 1933–1948	Succeeded by Jock Tiffin
Academic offices
Preceded by R. H. Tawney	President of the Workers' Educational Association; 1943–1958	Succeeded by Asa Briggs
