= LPU =

LPU may refer to:

== Organisations ==
- General Elections Institution (Lembaga Pemilihan Umum), former election organizer in Indonesia
- Linkin Park Underground, the fan club of an American rock band
- London and Provincial Union of Licensed Vehicle Workers, former British trade union
- Lovely Professional University, a university in Jalandhar, Punjab, India
- Lyceum of the Philippines University, a private university in the Philippines

== Other uses ==
- Language Processing Unit, an AI accelerator by Groq
- Least publishable unit, the smallest amount of information that can generate a publication in a peer-reviewed journal
