= Walter Lewis =

Walter Lewis may refer to:

- Walter Lewis (judge) (1849–1930), advocate and chief justice of British Honduras
- Wally Lewis (born 1959), Australian rugby league footballer
- Walter Lewis (rower) (1885–1956), Canadian Olympic rower
- Walter Lewis (trade unionist) (died 1926), Welsh trade union leader
- Walter P. Lewis (1866–1932), American silent film actor
- Furry Lewis (Walter E. Lewis, 1893 or 1899–1981), American blues musician
- Walter Lewis (gridiron football) (born 1962), gridiron football player
