= 1909 Mid Derbyshire by-election =

UK parliamentary by-election

The 1909 Mid Derbyshire by-election was a Parliamentary by-election held on 15 July 1909. The constituency returned one Member of Parliament (MP) to the House of Commons of the United Kingdom, elected by the first past the post voting system.

== Vacancy ==
The by-election was caused by the death of Sir James Jacoby on 23 June 1909. He had been Liberal MP for Mid Derbyshire since the 1885 general election.

== Electoral history ==
The Liberals easily held the seat at the last election, with an increased majority;

Jacoby

General election January 1906: Mid Derbyshire
Party	Candidate	Votes	%	±%
Liberal	James Alfred Jacoby	7,065	67.0	+10.5
Conservative	Samuel Cresswell	3,475	33.0	−10.5
Majority		3,590	34.0	+21.0
Turnout		10,540	82.6	−0.4
Liberal hold		Swing	+10.5	

== Candidates ==
The local Liberal Association selected 51-year-old John Hancock to defend the seat. Hancock was a miners agent for the Nottingham Miners Association and was sponsored by the Liberal Party supporting Derbyshire Miners Association. This was a significant selection as miners accounted for about two thirds of the electorate. The Labour Party were happy to give Hancock their support. The Conservatives re-selected Samuel Cresswell as their candidate.

== Campaign ==
Polling Day was fixed for the 15 July 1909, just 22 days after the death of the previous MP. Hancock closely associated himself with Lloyd George's People's Budget. During the campaign Hancock agreed that if elected, he would sign the Labour Party constitution. The Conservative campaign centred on the Navy and Tariff Reform.

== Result ==
Hancock held the seat with a reduced majority;

Mid Derbyshire by-election, 1909 Electorate 13,244
Party	Candidate	Votes	%	±%
Liberal	John Hancock	6,735	60.5	−6.5
Conservative	Samuel Cresswell	4,392	39.5	+6.5
Majority		2,343	21.0	−13.0
Turnout		11,127	84.0	+1.4
Liberal hold		Swing	-6.5	

== Aftermath ==
Hancock held the seat at the following General election under his new party label. However, along with many other miners MPs, he fell out with the Labour Party and crossed the floor back to the Liberal Party in 1915.

General election January 1910: Mid Derbyshire Electorate 13,660
Party	Candidate	Votes	%	±%
Labour	John Hancock	7,575	63.9	N/A
Conservative	Francis Francis	4,268	36.1	+3.1
Majority		3,289	27.8	N/A
Turnout		11,843	86.6	+4.0
Labour gain from Liberal		Swing		
