= Alfred Smith (British politician) =

British trade unionist and politician

Alfred Smith (1860 – 12 February 1931) was a British trade unionist and politician.

Born in Brighton to a Catholic family, Smith became an apprentice lighterman when he was eleven years old, but ran away to sea and settled in the United States. There, he took a variety of jobs, from tram driver to oil well worker, teamster to fisherman.

After some years at sea, Smith returned to London in 1884, where he became a taxi driver. He was a founder member of the London Cab Drivers' Union, and served as its president from 1906 to 1913. He then worked full-time as an official of its successors, the United Vehicle Workers and then the Transport and General Workers' Union.

Smith was also active in the Labour Party, and was elected to the council of the Municipal Borough of Willesden and also to Middlesex County Council. He stood in East Dorset at the 1918 general election, then switched to Leyton West in 1922, 1923 and 1924, but never won the seat. At the 1929 general election, he instead stood in Sunderland and won one of the two seats. He died in February 1931, still in office.

Parliament of the United Kingdom
| Preceded by Luke Thompson and Sir Walter Raine | Member of Parliament for Sunderland; 1929–1931; With: Marion Phillips | Succeeded by Marion Phillips and Luke Thompson |
