= Aaron Stewart =

Aaron Stewart (5 October 1845 – 30 November 1910) was a British trade unionist.

== Life ==
Born in Coleorton in Leicestershire, Stewart's father died when he was two years old, and he began working underground in a coal mine, illegally, at the age of eight. From the age of eighteen, he worked at various pits around England, before settling at Annesley Colliery in 1870. The mine had a local trade union, a remnant of the Derbyshire and Nottinghamshire Miners' Association, and Stewart became active in it.

In 1880, Stewart was elected checkweighman at Annesley, and he was a leading figure in the establishment of a new Nottinghamshire Miners' Association (NMA). He was elected as its secretary in 1884, serving part-time, but was unable to make progress in recruiting members, and stood aside in 1886. Instead, in 1888, he was elected as the union's president, in which role, he campaigned for an eight-hour day. In 1897, he was again elected as secretary of the union, and also sat on the executive of the Miners' Federation of Great Britain.

Stewart was seriously ill in 1910, and the NMA voted to reduce his salary as a result. He instead resigned his post, but died soon after, aged 65.

Trade union offices
Preceded by W. Kay	General Secretary of the Nottinghamshire Miners' Association; 1884 – 1886	Succeeded by William Bailey
Preceded by Charles West	President of the Nottinghamshire Miners' Association; 1888 – 1897	Succeeded by W. Hardy
Preceded by John Hancock	General Secretary of the Nottinghamshire Miners' Association; 1897 – 1910	Succeeded by Charles Bunfield
