= Derek Latham =

Derek James Latham (born 12 July 1946) is a British architect, urban designer, master planner, landscape architect, and founder of Lathams, a Derby-based architectural and urban design practice.

== Early career ==
Latham studied at the Leicester School of Architecture (now absorbed into De Montfort University) and began his career with Clifford Wearden Associates. His early work included housing developments and advisory work for the homelessness charity Shelter.

In 1970 he moved to Derby Borough Council where he served as an architect and planner, before becoming the Design and Conservation Office for Derbyshire County Council from 1974–78. In this time he was involved in a number of projects in the Derby area such as the renovation of the historic Midland Railway Cottages at Derby Train Station.

== Lathams ==
After a spell in private practice as a partner with Wood Latham Newton Partnership, Latham set up his own practice in 1980, Derek Latham & Associates – later rebranded as simply 'Lathams'. Founded as a conservation practice, Lathams expanded into conservation, education, and the creative renewal and regeneration of buildings, land and communities. In 2010 Latham left the role of managing director to become chairman.

Notable projects undertaken in his time at Lathams include The Victoria Quarter in Leeds for Prudential PM and the Jewellery Business Centre in Birmingham Jewellery Quarter for HRH Prince of Wales.

Latham has served as Regional Representative for the Commission for Architecture and the Built Environment (CABE) in the East Midlands, a founder member of Opun - (East Midlands Architecture and Built Environment Centre) and Chairman of Regeneration East Midlands (Centre for Excellence). He was also involved in establishing the Regional Project Design Review Panel, was a Yorkshire Forward Urban Renaissance Panel Member, and his work in conservation included spells with organisations including the Society for the Protection of Ancient Buildings (SPAB) and the Heritage Lottery Fund.

In 2008 he was awarded an Honorary Doctor of Professional Practice by the University of Derby.

Throughout his career he has been involved in a number of projects linked to the Derbyshire Historic Buildings Trust, and he currently serves as its Chairman. He is also currently serves as the Chair of the Derwent Valley Cycleway Trust, promoting the development of a continuous cycleway along the Derwent Valley UNESCO World Heritage Site.

== Personal life ==
Latham is married to Pauline Latham, the Member of Parliament for Mid Derbyshire from 2010 until 2024.

== Bibliography ==
- Latham, Derek (2000). Creative Re-use of Buildings. Donhead Publishing. ISBN 978-1-873394-36-6.
