= William Devenay =

British trade unionist and politician

Secretary of the General Workers' Group of the Transport and General Workers' Union
- In office 1922–1932

Mayor of West Ham
- In office 1919–1920

Personal details
- Born: 1864; Renfrew, Scotland
- Died: 12 May 1934 (aged 69–70)
- Political party: Independent Labour Party

William Devenay (1864 – 12 May 1934) was a British trade unionist and politician.

== Biography ==
Born in Renfrew in Scotland, he found work as a dock labourer, and moved to London, also working for a time driving a bakers' van. He joined the Dock, Wharf, Riverside and General Labourers' Union, and was soon working full-time for the union as its London District Secretary. He also became active in the Independent Labour Party (ILP), and in 1898 was elected as its first councillor in West Ham. The ILP affiliated to the Labour Party and, as more Labour councillors were elected, he became an alderman in 1911, and then Mayor of West Ham in 1919/20, the first former docker to become a Labour mayor. He also stood for Labour in Mile End at the 1918 United Kingdom general election, taking second place with 25.1% of the vote.

Devenay remained active in the Dockers' Union, becoming an assistant national organiser, and in 1911 was a leading figure in a strike of transport workers in London. Ben Tillett later described him as "...the plodder of the movement, and to his years of organising work is due a lot of the feeling aroused among the Transport Workers of London". In 1922, the union became part of the new Transport and General Workers' Union (TGWU), and Devenay was appointed as secretary of its General Workers Group.

In 1914, Devenay was appointed to the Port of London Authority, replacing Harry Orbell, and in 1930 he was made chair of its maintenance committee, the most senior position held to that date by any trade unionist on the body. He retired from his trade union posts in 1932, and died in May 1934.

Trade union offices
Preceded by New position	Secretary of the General Workers' Group of the Transport and General Workers' Union; 1922–1932	Succeeded by Arthur Deakin
Civic offices
Preceded by Edward William Wordley	Mayor of West Ham; 1919–1920	Succeeded by David John Davis
