= Tom O'Brien (trade unionist) =

British politician (1900–1970)

Portrait by Walter Bird, 1960

Sir Thomas O'Brien (17 August 1900 – 5 May 1970) was a British trade unionist and Labour Party politician. He was also a Member of Parliament (MP) from 1945 to 1959.

O'Brien worked as a stage electrician. In 1932 he replaced Hugh Roberts as General Secretary of the National Association of Theatrical and Kine Employees. He held the post until his death, and was a member of the TUC's International Committee. He was elected at the 1945 general election as the MP for Nottingham West, and after that constituency's abolition in boundary changes, he was re-elected at the 1950 general election for the new Nottingham North West seat. That constituency was in turn abolished for the 1955 general election, and that is when he was returned to the House of Commons for the re-established Nottingham West seat.

Parliament of the United Kingdom
Preceded by Arthur Hayday	Member of Parliament for Nottingham West; 1945–1950	Constituency abolished
New constituency	Member of Parliament for Nottingham North West; 1950–1955	Constituency abolished
New constituency	Member of Parliament for Nottingham West; 1955–1959	Succeeded by Sir Peter Tapsell
Trade union offices
Preceded by Hugh Roberts	General Secretary of the National Association of Theatrical and Kine Employees; 1932–1970	Succeeded by Robert Keenan
Preceded by John Brown and Arthur Horner	Trades Union Congress representative to the American Federation of Labour; 1946; With: Sam Watson	Succeeded by Arthur Deakin and Robert Openshaw
Preceded by Arthur Deakin	President of the Trades Union Congress; 1953	Succeeded by Jack Tanner
Preceded by Luke Fawcett	Chairman of the Trades Councils' Joint Consultative Committee; 1953 – 1970	Succeeded by George H. Lowthian?
