= Bennett baronets =

Baronetcy in the Baronetage of the United Kingdom

The Bennett Baronetcy, of Kirklington in the County of Nottingham, is a title in the Baronetage of the United Kingdom. It was created on 31 July 1929 for Albert James Bennett. He represented both Mansfield and Nottingham Central in the House of Commons. As of 2021 the title is held by his great-grandson, the fourth Baronet, who succeeded a kinsman in 2012.

== Bennett baronets, of Kirklington (1929) ==
Escutcheon of the Bennett baronets

- Sir Albert James Bennett, 1st Baronet (1872–1945)
- Sir Charles Wilfrid Bennett, 2nd Baronet (1898–1952)
- Sir Ronald Wilfrid Murdoch Bennett, 3rd Baronet (1930–2012)
- Sir Algernon James Bennett, 4th Baronet (born 1962)

The heir presumptive is the present holder's granduncle Peter Bennett (born 1938). There are no further heirs to the title.

== See also ==
- Bennet baronets
