= Arthur Deakin =

British trade unionist

The Right Honourable Arthur Deakin CH CBE
- Born: 11 November 1890; Sutton Coldfield, Warwickshire, England
- Died: 1 May 1955 (aged 64); Leicester, Leicestershire, England
- Occupation: Trade Union official

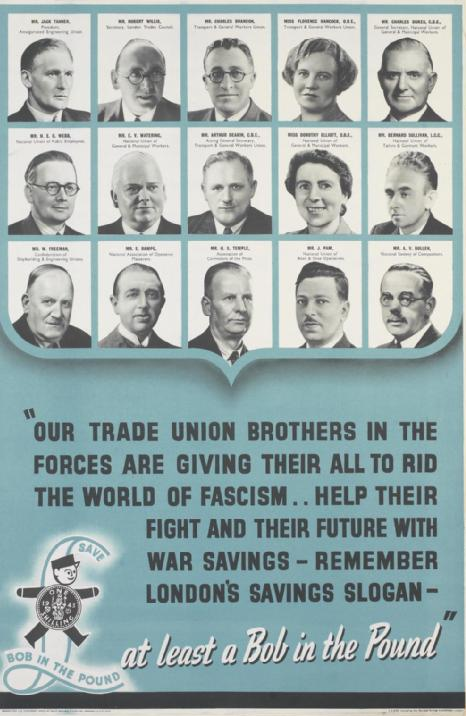
Deakin, third from left middle row, in a World War II patriotic poster

Arthur Deakin CH CBE PC (11 November 1890 – 1 May 1955) was a prominent British trade unionist who was acting general secretary of the Transport and General Workers' Union from 1940 and then general secretary from 1945 to 1955.

== Background ==
Arthur Deakin was born at Holland Street, Sutton Coldfield, Warwickshire, on 11 November 1890, the son of a domestic servant, Annie Deakin. His birth certificate did not record the name of his father. At the age of ten he moved with his mother and stepfather to Dowlais in South Wales.

== Career ==
Deakin began his working life at the age of 13 at the Dowlais Ironworks. https://doi.org/10.1093/ref:odnb/32761

In 1910, Deakin moved to Shotton in North Wales and took a job with another steel firm as a roll turner. He became an active trade unionist during the First World War and a full-time official in 1919.

In 1932, Deakin became national secretary of the General Workers National Trade Group within the TGWU. In 1935, he became assistant general secretary.

In 1940, Deaken effectively took over the position of general secretary, following the appointment of Ernest Bevin as a cabinet minister. Deakin's period as general secretary was marked by a consolidation of the powers of executive, occasional serious outbreaks of unofficial strike action among union members and a fierce anti-communist line.

During the 1950s he aligned with the right-wing Gaitskellite wing of the Labour Party, and favored expelling the leader of the left-wing faction Aneurin Bevan from the party. Although Bevan remained in the party, Deakin's union's endorsement was crucial for Hugh Gaitskell's victory over him in the 1955 Labour Party leadership election.

== Death ==
Deakin was due to retire in November 1955 but on 1 May 1955 Deakin was addressing a Labour Day rally at the Corn Exchange in Leicester when he collapsed, he was dead on arrival at hospital. He was succeeded as general secretary by Jock Tiffin.

Trade union offices
| Preceded by William Devenay | Secretary of the General Workers' Group of the Transport and General Workers' Union; 1932–1945 | Succeeded by T. H. Hodgson |
| Preceded by John Cliff | Assistant General Secretary of the Transport and General Workers' Union; 1935-1945 | Succeeded by Harold Clay |
| Preceded by Ernest Bevin | General Secretary of the Transport and General Workers' Union; 1945–1955 (acting 1940–1945) | Succeeded by Jock Tiffin |
| Preceded by Walter Citrine | President of the World Federation of Trade Unions; 1946–1948 | Succeeded by Giuseppe Di Vittorio |
| Preceded by Tom O'Brien and Sam Watson | Trades Union Congress representative to the American Federation of Labour; 1947; With: Robert Openshaw | Succeeded by Herbert Bullock and William Harold Hutchinson |
| Preceded by Alfred Roberts | President of the Trades Union Congress; 1952 | Succeeded by Tom O'Brien |
| Preceded by Robert Bratschi | President of the International Transport Workers' Federation; 1954–1955 | Succeeded by Hans Jahn |
