= Jock Tiffin =

British trade union leader (1896–1955)

Jock Tiffin OBE

General Secretary of the Transport and General Workers' Union
- In office 1 May 1955 – 27 December 1955

Assistant General Secretary of the Transport and General Workers' Union
- In office 1948 – 1 May 1955

Personal details
- Born: Arthur Ernest Tiffin; 11 February 1896 Carlisle, England
- Died: 27 December 1955 (aged 59)
- Occupation: Bus driver, trade unionist

Arthur Ernest Tiffin OBE (11 February 1896 – 27 December 1955), commonly known as Jock Tiffin or A. E. Tiffin, was the third general secretary of the British Transport and General Workers' Union (TGWU). He served for only a few months in 1955 before his death.

Tiffin was born in Carlisle. After leaving Bishop Creighton School, he became a clerk on the London and North Western Railway, he joined the Foot Guards when the First World War broke out, later transferring to the Royal Artillery. He was wounded and invalided home, where army doctors advised him to find a more active occupation than his previous office job in order to improve his health. In 1919, therefore, he became a bus driver for the London General Omnibus Company. A trade unionist since 1912, he joined the Transport and General Workers' Union and rose rapidly through the ranks. In 1930, he was given the job of organising the workers on the company's new Green Line services throughout London and the Home counties and two years later he became a full-time union officer as Outer London Passenger Organiser. In 1940 he became the Area Organiser of Area No.1 (London and South East). He also served for seven years as chairman of the London Trades Council, struggling in vain against its domination by Communists (which eventually led to its disbandment by the Trades Union Congress (TUC)), and for four years as chairman of the London Labour Party. During the Second World War he commanded a Home Guard battalion and was TUC representative on the Territorial Army Advisory Committee.

In 1948, he was appointed assistant general secretary of the TGWU in succession to Harold Clay. In 1949, he was elected to the National Executive Committee of the Labour Party. He was appointed Officer of the Order of the British Empire (OBE) in 1951.

In 1955, while elections were underway for his successor, general secretary Arthur Deakin died suddenly and Tiffin took over as acting general secretary. Later that year he was officially elected to the post, beating Charles Brandon, who had previously been his superior as area secretary of Area No.1, as well as Frank Cousins, Tom Hodgson, Harry Nicholas, and Bill Tudor. Three or four months after taking office Tiffin became seriously ill and died after just over six months as general secretary. He was succeeded by Frank Cousins, who had replaced him as assistant general secretary and acted as general secretary during his illness. Tiffin's short period of office was troubled by a dock strike and a dispute between the TGWU and the National Amalgamated Stevedores and Dockers.

Trade union offices
Preceded by George Lindgren	Chair of the London Trades Council; 1942–1948	Succeeded by Geoffrey Collings
Preceded by Harold Clay	Assistant General Secretary of the Transport and General Workers' Union; 1948-1955	Succeeded by Frank Cousins
Preceded by Charles Geddes and Edwin Hall	Trades Union Congress representative to the AFL-CIO; 1954; With: Jim Baty	Succeeded by Jim Campbell and Tom Eccles
Preceded by Arthur Deakin	General Secretary of the Transport and General Workers Union; 1955	Succeeded by Frank Cousins
Party political offices
Preceded by Harold Clay	Chairman of the London Labour Party; 1948 – 1952	Succeeded by Charles Brandon
