= Frank Varley =

Frank Bradley Varley (18 June 1885 – 17 March 1929) was a Labour Party politician in the United Kingdom.

Born in Alfreton in Derbyshire, Varley became a coal miner before winning election as a checkweighman. He undertook part-time study at the University of Sheffield, and became active in the Nottinghamshire Miners' Association, serving as its Financial Secretary and President. He also served on the executive of the Miners' Federation of Great Britain.

Varley was a supporter of the Labour Party, and won election to Derbyshire County Council in 1913, serving until 1919. In 1921/22, he served on the National Executive Committee of the Labour Party.

He was elected at the 1923 general election as member of parliament (MP) for Mansfield in Nottinghamshire, and held the seat until his death in 1929, aged 43. The date of the 1929 general election was announced on 24 April, and no by-election was held before Parliament was dissolved on 10 May.

Parliament of the United Kingdom
Preceded by Albert James Bennett	Member of Parliament for Mansfield; 1923 – 1929	Succeeded by Charles Brown
Trade union offices
Preceded by George Alfred Spencer	President of the Nottinghamshire Miners' Association; 1918–1929	Succeeded by Bill Bayliss
