= Harry N. Harrison =

British trade unionist

Harry N. Harrison (died 21 December 1947) was a British trade unionist.

Harrison grew up in Warrington and started an apprenticeship as a tanner. While an apprentice, he joined a trade union; as a result, his employer sacked him, and Harrison moved to Liverpool to find work. He became active on Liverpool Trades Council, in the National Union of General and Municipal Workers, and the Confederation of Shipbuilding and Engineering Unions (CSEU).

Harrison was elected to the General Council of the Trades Union Congress (TUC) in 1937, serving until his death. He also acted as the TUC's delegate to the American Federation of Labour in 1943. He served for two years as President of the CSEU, and was very active in the formation of the World Federation of Trade Unions.

Trade union offices
Preceded by John W. Stephenson	President of the Confederation of Shipbuilding and Engineering Unions; 1941 – 1943	Succeeded by Mark Hodgson
Preceded by Bryn Roberts and Jack Tanner	Trades Union Congress representative to the American Federation of Labour; 1943; With: Bill Bayliss	Succeeded by John Brown and Arthur Horner
Preceded by John Marchbank	Chairman of the Trades Councils' Joint Consultative Committee; 1944 – 1947	Succeeded by Luke Fawcett
