= Jonathan Davies (politician) =

British politician

Jonathan Davies MP
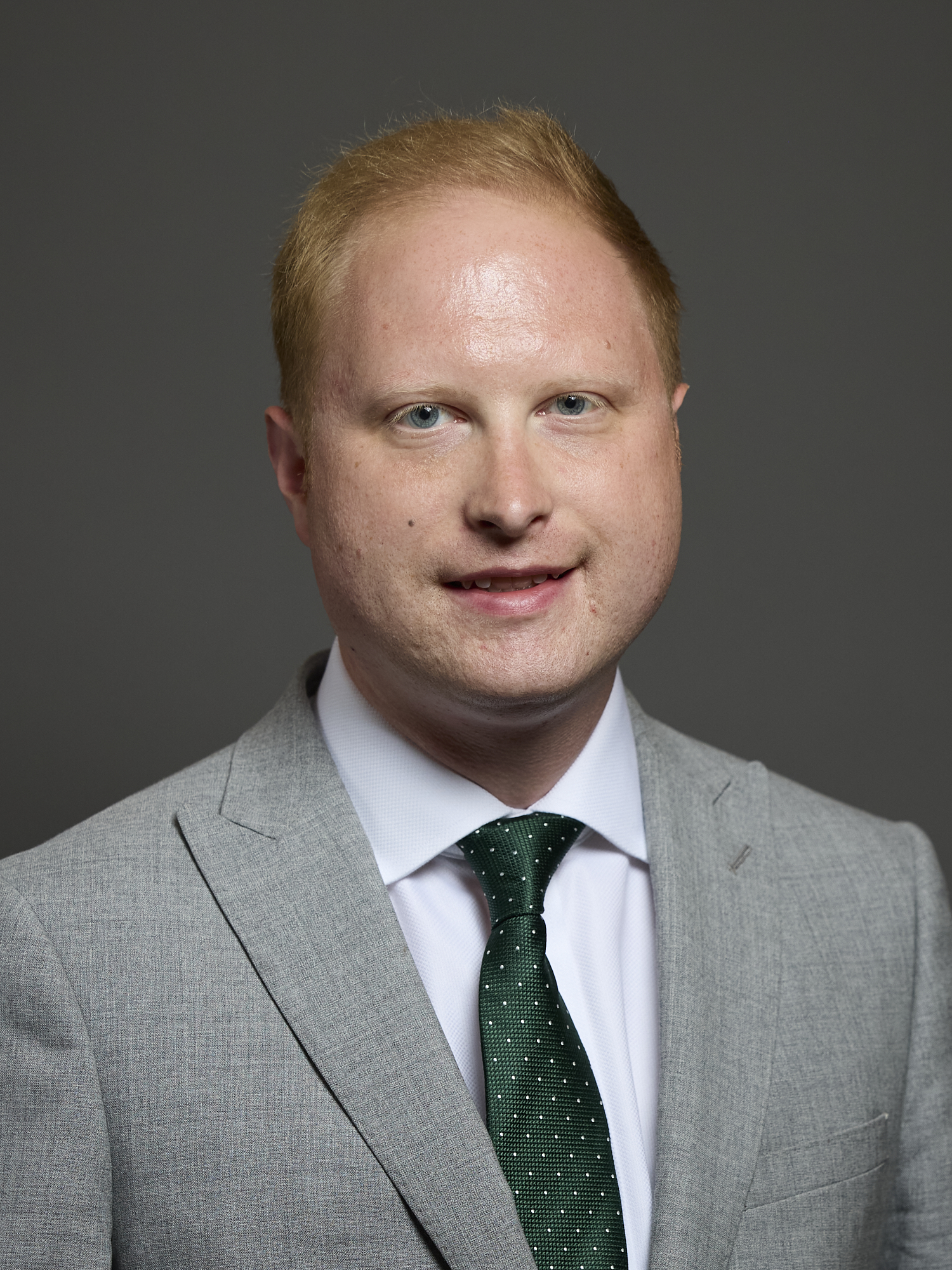
- Official portrait, 2024

Member of Parliament for Mid Derbyshire
- Incumbent
- Assumed office 4 July 2024
- Preceded by: Pauline Latham
- Majority: 1,878 (4%)

Personal details
- Party: Labour
- Website: jonathan-davies.net

Jonathan Davies is a British Labour Party politician who has been the member of parliament (MP) for Mid Derbyshire since 2024.

Davies was born and educated in Lancashire, and has a Music Degree from Lady Margaret Hall, Oxford.

Davies' personal website says that "Jonathan has lived in Derbyshire for 13 years and began his career teaching music in schools before going into healthcare regulation." He was also a Councillor for the Borough of Chesterfield, where he was the Cabinet Member for Health and Wellbeing.
