= Stanley Hirst (trade unionist) =

British trade unionist

Stanley Hirst (1876 – 12 June 1950) was a British trade unionist.

Born in Huddersfield, Hirst left school at the age of ten to work in a mill, then later became a tram driver. He joined the Amalgamated Association of Tramway and Vehicle Workers, soon becoming its full-time assistant general secretary, then in 1917 the general secretary. He took this into a merger which in 1919 formed the United Vehicle Workers, becoming general secretary of the new union, then in 1922, he led the union into the merger which formed the Transport and General Workers' Union (TGWU), becoming financial secretary of the new union.

Hirst was also active in the Labour Party, sitting on its National Executive Committee (NEC) from 1930, and serving as Chairman of the Labour Party in his first year. He retired both from the NEC and from his union posts in 1941. After his retirement he spent four years as a member of Halifax Town Council.

Hirst was a member of the Metropolitan Water Board and chairman of the Co-operative Printing Society Limited.

Trade union offices
| Preceded by George Jackson | General Secretary of the Amalgamated Association of Tramway and Vehicle Workers; 1917–1919 | Succeeded by Position abolished |
| Preceded by New position | General Secretary of the United Vehicle Workers; 1919–1922 | Succeeded by Position abolished |
Party political offices
| Preceded by Susan Lawrence | Chair of the Labour Party; 1930–1931 | Succeeded by George Lathan |
