= William Bailey (trade unionist) =

British trade unionist

William Bailey (29 June 1851 – 29 July 1896) was a British trade unionist.

Born in Saint Helena, Bailey's father was a soldier, and the family returned to England in 1857, settling at Bargate (near West Row), Suffolk. Bailey worked on a farm from the age of nine, then when he was fourteen moved to work at Fence Colliery near Sheffield. He later transferred to Beighton Colliery, then Norwood Colliery, just over the border in Derbyshire. He was elected as the pit's checkweighman, and also became active in the South Yorkshire Miners' Association (SYMA).

Bailey was a founder of the Derbyshire Miners' Association, a split from the SYMA, and represented it on the Trades Union Congress in 1883, 1887 and 1889. In 1884, he supported a strike at Norwood Colliery, and was fired, forcing him to take work as an insurance agent. This enabled him to become more politically active, being a founder of the Labour Electoral Association (LEA) in 1886, and leading a campaign for miners to be able to elect any other miners as their checkweighman, even if they were based at another colliery. This campaign was successful, with a law enabling it being passed in 1887. That year, Bailey was invited to become the full-time agent and general secretary of the Nottinghamshire Miners' Association. He took the post, and proved highly successful; in six years, he took membership from around 500 to nearly 19,000.

Bailey remained involved with the LEA, and became a vice-president in 1890, and then president in 1892. In 1889, he was elected to Nottingham Town Council as a Liberal-Labour member, serving until his death. He was a founder of the Miners Federation of Great Britain in 1890 and served on its executive committee. In 1893, he stood down as general secretary, instead taking up the post of financial secretary, which he held until his death, aged 45, in 1896.

In his spare time, Bailey was a Primitive Methodist preacher.

Trade union offices
Preceded by Aaron Stewart	General Secretary of the Nottinghamshire Miners' Association; 1887–1893	Succeeded by John Hancock
