= Sir Albert Bennett, 1st Baronet =

British politician

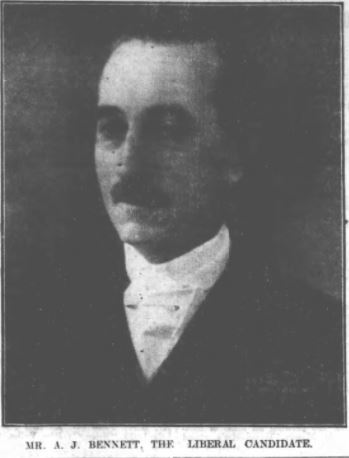

Sir Albert James Bennett, 1st Baronet JP (17 September 1872 – 14 December 1945) was a politician in the United Kingdom who was elected both as a Liberal Party Member of Parliament (MP) and as a Conservative Party MP.

== Biography ==
From 1914 to 1919, he was Controller of Propaganda, Central and South America.

As a Liberal, in 1918 he unsuccessfully contested the Chippenham constituency in Wiltshire. At the 1922 general election he stood in Mansfield, unseating the Labour MP William Carter. However, he lost the Mansfield seat at the 1923 general election, and in 1924 he was elected as a Conservative in the Nottingham Central seat. He was re-elected in 1929, but resigned from Parliament the following year following bankruptcy.

He took possession of Kirklington Hall, Nottinghamshire, in 1920. On 31 July 1929, he was made a baronet, of Kirklington in the county of Nottinghamshire.

== Family ==
In 1896 he married Caroline Carleton Backus, daughter of American brewing magnate Jacob Backus, by whom he had two sons and one daughter; the eldest son, Charles, inherited the baronetcy. A barrister and Metropolitan Police Court Magistrate, he served in the British Army in both World War I and World War II, and was promoted to the rank of lieutenant colonel in the Sherwood Rangers Yeomanry.

Caroline and Albert were divorced in 1938, and Albert remarried in May to Leopoldine Armata. They had one son, Peter Bennett, born on 18 August 1938. Sir Albert died in 1945, aged 73.

Parliament of the United Kingdom
| Preceded by William Carter | Member of Parliament for Mansfield; 1922 – 1923 | Succeeded by Frank Varley |
| Preceded by Reginald Berkeley | Member of Parliament for Nottingham Central; 1924 – 1930 | Succeeded by Terence James O'Connor |
Baronetage of the United Kingdom
| New creation | Baronet (of Kirklington); 1929–1945 | Succeeded by Lt. Col Charles Bennett |
