= John Brown (trade unionist) =

British trade unionist and politician

John Brown (1880 or 1881 – 10 March 1961) was a British trade unionist and politician.

Brown first joined the National Amalgamated Society of Enginemen, Cranemen, Boilermen and Firemen in 1905, and four years later was appointed as a full-time organiser for the union. Three years later, he instead became an organiser for the British Steel Smelters' Association (BSSA). In 1917, this became part of the Iron and Steel Trades Confederation (ISTC), and he was appointed as a divisional officer.

Brown was also active in the Labour Party, and was elected to Manchester City Council. In 1935, with the ISTC's general secretary Arthur Pugh about to retire, Brown was appointed as his assistant for six months and moved to Glasgow, where he was elected to Glasgow City Council.

Pugh retired at the end of 1935, and Brown was chosen as his replacement. He was also elected to the General Council of the Trades Union Congress (TUC). In 1944, he represented the TUC to the American Federation of Labour. He retired from his union posts in 1946, and sat on various government committees.

Trade union offices
Preceded by New position	Assistant General Secretary of the Iron and Steel Trades Confederation; 1935–1936	Succeeded by Lincoln Evans
Preceded by Arthur Pugh	General Secretary of the Iron and Steel Trades Confederation; 1936–1946	Succeeded by Lincoln Evans
Preceded by Arthur Pugh and William Kean	Iron, Steel and Minor Metal Trades representative on the General Council of the TUC; 1935 – 1945; With: William Kean	Succeeded by Lincoln Evans and Ambrose Callighan
Preceded by Bill Bayliss and Harry N. Harrison	Trades Union Congress representative to the American Federation of Labour; 1944; With: Arthur Horner	Succeeded by Tom O'Brien and Sam Watson
