= John C. Little =

British trade unionist

John Carruthers Little (9 September 1874 – 13 September 1957) was a British trade unionist.

Born in Penton in Cumberland, Little became an engineer and joined the Amalgamated Society of Engineers (ASE) in 1897. By 1922, the ASE had become the Amalgamated Engineering Union (AEU), and Little began working full-time for the union. He was elected as the union's president in 1933, serving until 1939.

During World War II, Little was a Director of Labour Supply for the Ministry of Labour and National Service. After the war, he served on the Admiralty Manpower Economy Committee and the Committee on Houses of Outstanding Historic and Architectural Interest.

Little was made a Commander of the Order of the British Empire in 1941.

Trade union offices
Preceded by William Harold Hutchinson	President of the Amalgamated Engineering Union; 1933–1939	Succeeded by Jack Tanner
Preceded by George Gibson and William Kean	Trades Union Congress representative to the American Federation of Labour; 1937; With: William R. Townley	Succeeded by Joseph Jones and John W. Stephenson
