= Nottinghamshire Miners' Association =

- Merged into: National Union of Mineworkers
- Founded: 1881
- Headquarters: Basford, Nottinghamshire
- Location: United Kingdom
- Members: 28,415 (1907)
- Affiliations: Miners' Federation of Great Britain

The Nottinghamshire Miners' Association was a trade union representing coal miners in Nottinghamshire, England.

A Derbyshire and Nottinghamshire Miners' Association was founded in the 1860s, but became moribund by the 1870s, although some branches remained active, including trade unionists such as Samuel Smith, Aaron Stewart and William Hardy. In 1881, they constituted a new Nottingham Miners' Federation based on the rules of the old union, and by 1884 membership had risen to more than 2,000. That year, two unsuccessful strikes took place and membership halved. In response, the union elected new officials and adopted a new name, the "Nottinghamshire Miners' Association", and constitution. In 1889, the Association was a founder member of the Miners' Federation of Great Britain.

In 1926, at the height of the General Strike, General Secretary George Alfred Spencer, on behalf of the Nottinghamshire Miners Association, negotiated a deal with the local mine owners which brought him into conflict with the Miners' Federation of Great Britain, who wished to see the strike continue. Unhappy with the influence of the MFGB, Spencer led a breakaway from the NMA, supported by moderates such as John Hancock, setting up the Nottinghamshire and District Miners' Industrial Union (NMIU) based mostly in The Dukeries. The NMIU lasted for eleven years separate from the Miners' Federation of Great Britain. In 1937, an agreement was reached between the NMA and the NMIU and they merged to form the Nottinghamshire Miners' Federated Union, with Spencer becoming the President.

In 1945, the union became the Nottinghamshire Area of the National Union of Mineworkers. Following the 1984–1985 miners' strike, the majority of members broke away to form the Union of Democratic Mineworkers.

== Presidents ==
1881: Joseph Allen
1883: Joseph Hopkin
1884: Charles West
1888: Aaron Stewart
1897: William Hardy
1899: John E. Whyatt
1907: Charles Bunfield
1909: William Carter
1910: John E. Whyatt
1912: George Alfred Spencer
1918: Frank Varley
1929: Bill Bayliss
1930: Val Coleman
1932: Herbert Booth
1937: Bernard Taylor
1937: George Alfred Spencer
1945: Bill Bayliss
1952: E. J. Ley
1956: Alf Eggleshaw
1957: Jack Tighe
1971: Len Clarke
1979: Ray Chadburn
Keith Stanley

== General Secretaries ==
1881: William Kay
1884: Aaron Stewart
1887: William Bailey
1893: John Hancock
1897: Aaron Stewart
1910: Charles Bunfield
1914:
1918: George Alfred Spencer
1926: William Carter
1932: Val Coleman
1945: Herbert Booth
by 1955: Albert Martin
1971: Len Martin
1977: Joe Whelan
1983: Henry Richardson
