= Oakwood, Derby =

Coordinates: 52.945°N 1.425°W

Oakwood
- Location within Derbyshire
- Population: 13,259
- OS grid reference: SK381383
- Unitary authority: Derby
- Ceremonial county: Derbyshire
- Region: East Midlands
- Country: England
- Sovereign state: United Kingdom
- Post town: DERBY
- Postcode district: DE21
- Dialling code: 01332
- Police: Derbyshire
- Fire: Derbyshire
- Ambulance: East Midlands
- UK Parliament: Mid Derbyshire

Oakwood is a modern housing estate in Derby, Derbyshire, England that was built mainly in the 1980s and 1990s. At the time of construction, it was one of the largest new housing estates in Europe.

== Development ==
It is situated on the outskirts of the city, bordering the suburb of Chaddesden, which contains one of the largest council housing estates in England. Oakwood is built on land which used to be known as Chaddesden Common, and has three clusters of shops. The largest of these shops carries amenities suitable to supply a large village. New houses are constantly being added to expand the coverage of Oakwood.

The Oakwood Electoral Ward, which encompasses all of the Oakwood Estate, the Durose Country Park estate and part of Chaddesden, is one of the 18 wards which make up Derby City Council.

Oakwood Ward is currently represented on Derby City Council by Local Conservatives Councillors Matthew Eyre, Jamie Mulhall and Freya Trewhella, who were all elected in May 2023.

== History ==
The original oak wood, from which the area is named, has been preserved as Chaddesden Wood Nature Reserve, and is maintained by the council. It is the only ancient oak woodland in the city of Derby. In 1991, it was declared a local nature reserve. The wood contains a nature trail open to the public, roughly half a mile long. This is a popular resource for the people of North Derby and in Spring the wood is covered by a carpet of bluebells as can be seen in the photograph on this page.

There are still remains of an old small railway line on the green area at the roundabout of Oakwood Drive and Bishops Drive. This small railway was privately owned and is thought to have stretched south down to the old Chaddesden village and as far north as the old mainline just north of the suburb.

== Layout ==
In addition to residential areas, a leisure centre, a school and a football academy are also situated within Oakwood. The leisure centre was first planned by a private businessman before being taken over and completed by the council. In 2008 the leisure centre was expanded to include a much enlarged gym and a library opened. The school promised from early on in the development of Oakwood is a primary school (ages 3–11) that caters for some of the children living within the local community (although it is far too small to cater for all of them). The football academy at Moor Farm is owned by Derby County Football Club who moved to the premises from their old training ground, the RamArena, at Raynesway.

There is also a sizeable park surrounding a modern community centre, as well as many smaller areas, or "green wedges" that have been designed to provide routes throughout the estate for use by walkers and wildlife.

== Gallery ==
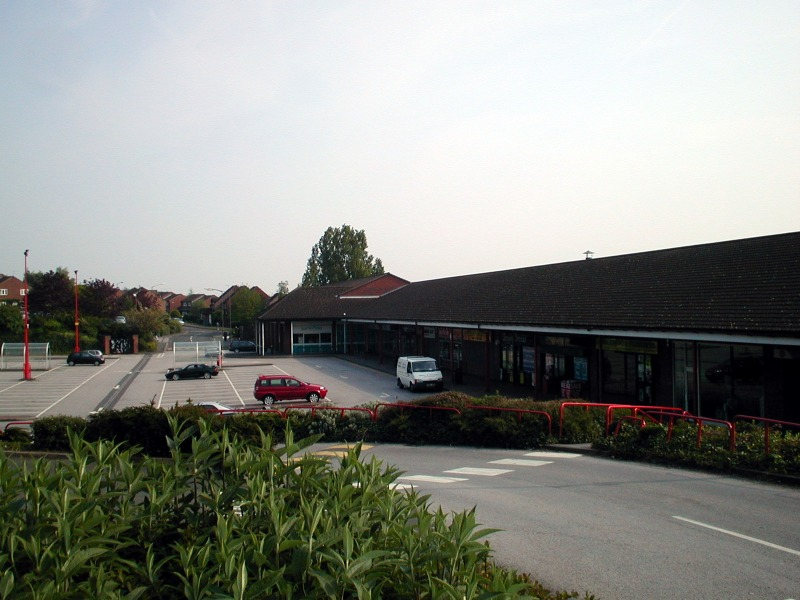
Oakwood shopping centre, April 2007

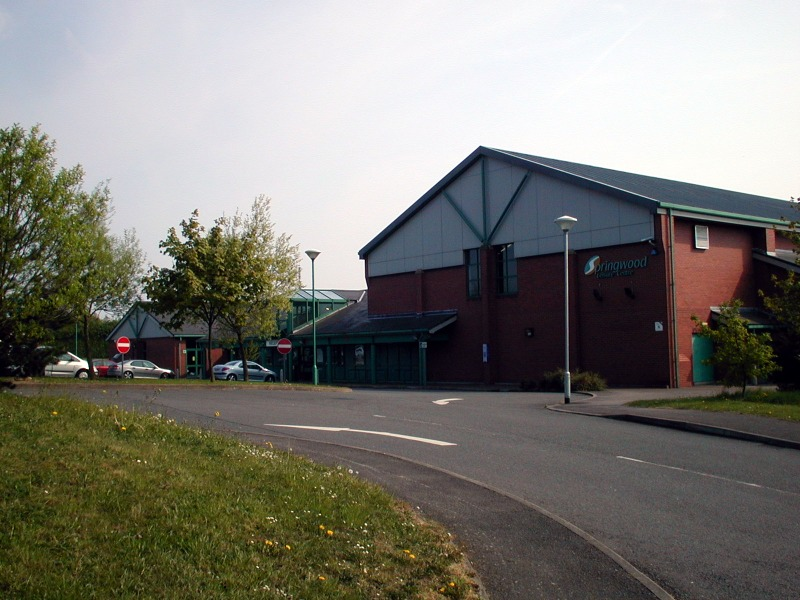
Springwood Leisure Centre, April 2007
