= Edward Hough =

British trade unionist

Edward Hough (5 November 1879 – 22 November 1952) was a British trade unionist.

Born in Edinburgh, Hough was orphaned at the age of six months, and was brought up by an aunt who lived in Yorkshire. He left school at the age of twelve to work at the Ossett Roundwood Colliery, then in 1900 moved to work at Featherstone. He became active in the Yorkshire Miners' Association (YMA), becoming the branch delegate in 1903, and branch secretary in 1909/10. During World War I, he studied at Ruskin College. In 1919, he was elected as Vice-President of the YMA, a post he held for many years.

Hough joined the Independent Labour Party (ILP) in the 1890s, and was a prominent campaigner for the ILP candidate in the 1897 Barnsley by-election. In 1910, he stood for election to the West Riding County Council for the Labour Party, with the support of the ILP. Although he was unsuccessful, he stood repeatedly until he was finally elected in 1925. On the council, he became known for his campaigns for new housing for workers. He also stood unsuccessfully in Don Valley at the 1918 general election.

In 1943, Hough was elected to the executive of the Miners' Federation of Great Britain, using his position to advocate for the nationalisation of the coal mines.

Trade union offices
Preceded by John Guest	Vice-President of the Yorkshire Miners' Association; 1919–1945	Succeeded by Fred Collindridge
Preceded by Walter Citrine	Trades Union Congress representative to the American Federation of Labour; 1941; With: George Walker Thomson	Succeeded by Bryn Roberts and Jack Tanner
