= Bill Bayliss =

British trade unionist

William Bayliss (19 December 1886 – 12 February 1963) was a British trade unionist.

Born in Leicestershire, Bayliss left school at the age of twelve to work at a colliery. He joined the Leicestershire Miners' Association, but after becoming involved in industrial action, he was sacked and, a year later, moved to Nottinghamshire to find work. There, he became active in the Nottinghamshire Miners' Association, and also in the Labour Party.

Bayliss became his union branch delegate in 1915, and served a year as vice-president of the union in 1927, and a year as president in 1929. In 1932, he became the union's full-time financial secretary. In this role he worked with Herbert Booth to promote reunification with the rival Nottinghamshire Miners' Industrial Union, which was achieved in 1937, whereupon he became an agent for the merged Nottinghamshire Miners' Federated Union (NMFU).

In 1943, Bayliss was chosen as one of the Trades Union Congress' two representatives to the American Federation of Labour.

Bayliss was elected to Nottinghamshire County Council, becoming an alderman, and serving as its chairman from 1945. In 1946, he was elected as President of the Nottinghamshire Area of the National Union of Mineworkers, successor of the NMFU; he served until 1952, when he retired and joined the National Coal Board.

Trade union offices
| Preceded by Frank Varley | President of the Nottinghamshire Miners' Association; 1929 | Succeeded by Val Coleman |
| Preceded by Bryn Roberts and Jack Tanner | Trades Union Congress representative to the American Federation of Labour; 1943; With: Harry N. Harrison | Succeeded by John Brown and Arthur Horner |
| Preceded by George Alfred Spencer | President of the Nottinghamshire Area of the National Union of Mineworkers; 1945–1952 | Succeeded by E. J. Ley |
