= Herbert Bullock =

British trade unionist (1885–1967)

Herbert Lionel Bullock (1885 – September 1967) was a British trade unionist.

Born in Bristol, Bullock began working at the age of eleven. He joined the National Union of Gas Workers and General Labourers early in life. His union merged into the National Union of General and Municipal Workers (NUGMW), and in 1926, he began working for it full-time. In 1935, he was appointed as the NUGMW's National Industrial Officer, and this led, two years later, to a seat on the General Council of the Trades Union Congress (TUC).

Bullock devoted the remainder of his working life to the union, chairing the TUC's education and local government committees, serving for the International Labour Organization, and taking a particular interest in adult education. He also sat on the National Arbitration Tribunal Panel, and the Royal Commission on Taxation and Profits.

Bullock was elected as President of the TUC for 1950, following which, he retired. In retirement, he still continued to attend the TUC as a guest, and died in 1967 in a hotel in between sessions of congress.

Trade union offices
Preceded by Arthur Deakin and Robert Openshaw	Trades Union Congress representative to the American Federation of Labour; 1948; With: William Harold Hutchinson	Succeeded by Lincoln Evans and Tom Williamson
Preceded by Will Lawther	President of the Trades Union Congress; 1949/50	Succeeded by Alfred Roberts
