= Bryn Roberts =

Welsh trade union leader

Bryn Roberts (7 April 1897 – 26 August 1964) was a Welsh trade union leader.

Roberts grew up in Abertillery, leaving school at the age of thirteen to work at a colliery. He joined the South Wales Miners' Federation (SWMF), and won a union scholarship to attend the Central Labour College in 1919. Two years later, he returned to Wales and was elected as checkweighman for Rhymney, then worked full-time for the union as its agent for Rhymney Valley and sat on its executive. He was also elected as a local councillor for the Labour Party. In 1929 he finished second behind Aneurin Bevan in the contest to find a Labour candidate for the Ebbw Vale constituency.

In 1934, Roberts left the SWMF to become General Secretary of the National Union of Public Employees (NUPE). He represented the union at the Trades Union Congress (TUC), and was the TUC's representative to the American Federation of Labour in 1942. In 1954, he was part of a joint trade union and Parliamentary delegation to China.

Roberts retired in 1962 due to increasingly poor health, and died two years later, aged 67.

Trade union offices
Preceded by Walter Lewis	Agent for the Rhymney Valley District of the South Wales Miners' Federation; 1926–1934	Succeeded by Ness Edwards and Albert Thomas
Preceded by Jack Wills	General Secretary of the National Union of Public Employees; 1934 – 1962	Succeeded by Sydney Hill
Preceded by Edward Hough and George Walker Thomson	Trades Union Congress representative to the American Federation of Labour; 1942; With: Jack Tanner	Succeeded by Bill Bayliss and Harry N. Harrison
