= Robert Openshaw =

British trade unionist (1891–1962)

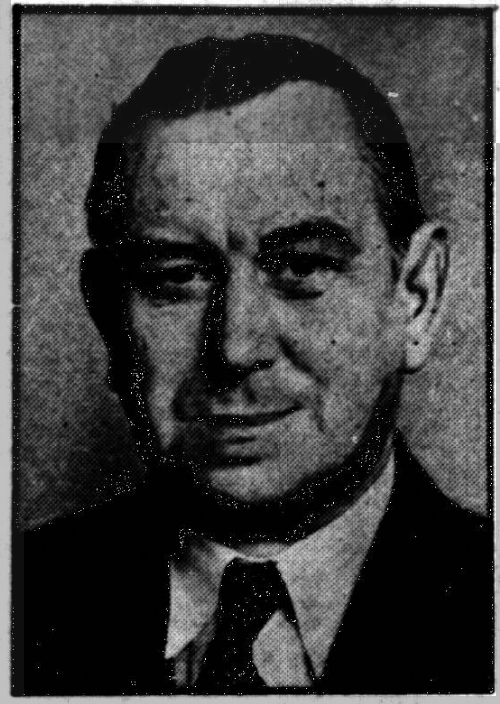
Robert Openshaw, 1954

Robert Openshaw (3 September 1891 – 6 November 1962) was a British trade unionist.

Born in Bolton, Openshaw was a keen cricketer, and once took all ten wickets in a Bolton Cricket League match. He moved to Crewe to find work, and became an engineer in the railway workshops there. He joined the Amalgamated Engineering Union and in 1930 was one of the youngest members to be elected to the union's executive council.

Openshaw represented the AEU on the National Executive Committee of the Labour Party from 1940 to 1948, and at the Trades Union Congress (TUC). He served as the TUC's representative to the American Federation of Labour in 1947, and was also elected to the General Council of the TUC in 1948.

In 1954, Openshaw was elected as the President of the AEU. In the first ballot, he led the field of seven candidates with 23,592 votes (29.2%) out of the 80,841 votes cast. In the second ballot, Openshaw received 49,804 votes (60%) compared to the 33,137 polled by his left wing opponent Claude Berridge, who was a member of the Communist Party.

Openshaw served as AEU President from May 1954 until his retirement in September 1956.

Trade union offices
Preceded by Tom O'Brien and Sam Watson	Trades Union Congress representative to the American Federation of Labour; 1947; With: Arthur Deakin	Succeeded by Herbert Bullock and William Harold Hutchinson
Preceded by Jack Tanner	President of the Amalgamated Engineering Union; 1954 – 1956	Succeeded by William Carron
