= William Carter (Mansfield MP) =

British politician

William Carter (12 June 1862 – 29 February 1932) was a Labour Party politician in the United Kingdom.

Carter was born in Mansfield, and became a coal miner before winning election as checkweighman. He also became active in the Nottinghamshire Miners' Association (NMA), serving as its president in 1909, and later becoming a full-time official. He also served on the executive of the Miners' Federation of Great Britain.

Carter was a supporter of the Labour Party, and was elected to Mansfield Town Council. During World War I, he served on the Local Appeals Tribunal. He was elected at the 1918 general election as Member of Parliament (MP) for Mansfield in Nottinghamshire, but was defeated at the 1922 general election by the Liberal Party candidate, Albert Bennett.

Carter did not stand for Parliament again, instead returning to the NMA. He was elected as general secretary of the union in 1926, serving until his death in 1932.

Parliament of the United Kingdom
Preceded by Sir Charles Seely	Member of Parliament for Mansfield; 1918 – 1922	Succeeded by Albert James Bennett
Trade union offices
Preceded by Charles Bunfield	President of the Nottinghamshire Miners' Association; 1909	Succeeded by John E. Whyatt
Preceded by George Alfred Spencer	General Secretary of the Nottinghamshire Miners' Association; 1926–1932	Succeeded by Val Coleman
