= William Kean =

British trade unionist

William Kean (17 March 1871 – 5 January 1954) was a British trade unionist.

Born in Sheffield, Kean became a cutler working in silver and a trade unionist. By his early twenties he was secretary of the small Sheffield-based Spoon and Fork Filers, Odd Workers and Stampers Society. From this position, he masterminded a merger of several small unions which formed the National Union of Gold, Silver and Allied Trades (NUGSAT), completed in 1911, and became its first secretary.

In 1921, Kean was elected to the General Council of the Trades Union Congress (TUC), remaining in place until 1945, and serving as President of the TUC in 1934/1935.

In his spare time, Kean was a magistrate, was active on the Sheffield Trades Council, a founder of Sheffield's Labour Representation Committee, and served on a variety of government committees. In the 1939 New Year Honours, he was made an Officer of the Order of the British Empire. He finally retired as secretary of NUGSAT in 1953, and died the following year.

Trade union offices
Preceded by New position	Secretary of the National Union of Gold, Silver and Allied Trades; 1911–1953	Succeeded by J. Edley
Preceded by New position	Iron, Steel and Minor Metal Trades representative on the General Council of the TUC; 1921–1945; With: Arthur Pugh (1921–1935); John Brown (1935–1945)	Succeeded by Lincoln Evans and Ambrose Callighan
Preceded by Andrew Conley	President of the Trades Union Congress; 1934/35	Succeeded by Allan Findlay
Preceded by Andrew Conley and Andrew Naesmith	Trades Union Congress representative to the American Federation of Labour; 1936; With: George Gibson	Succeeded by John C. Little and William R. Townley
