= Pauline Latham =

British politician

Pauline Latham OBE
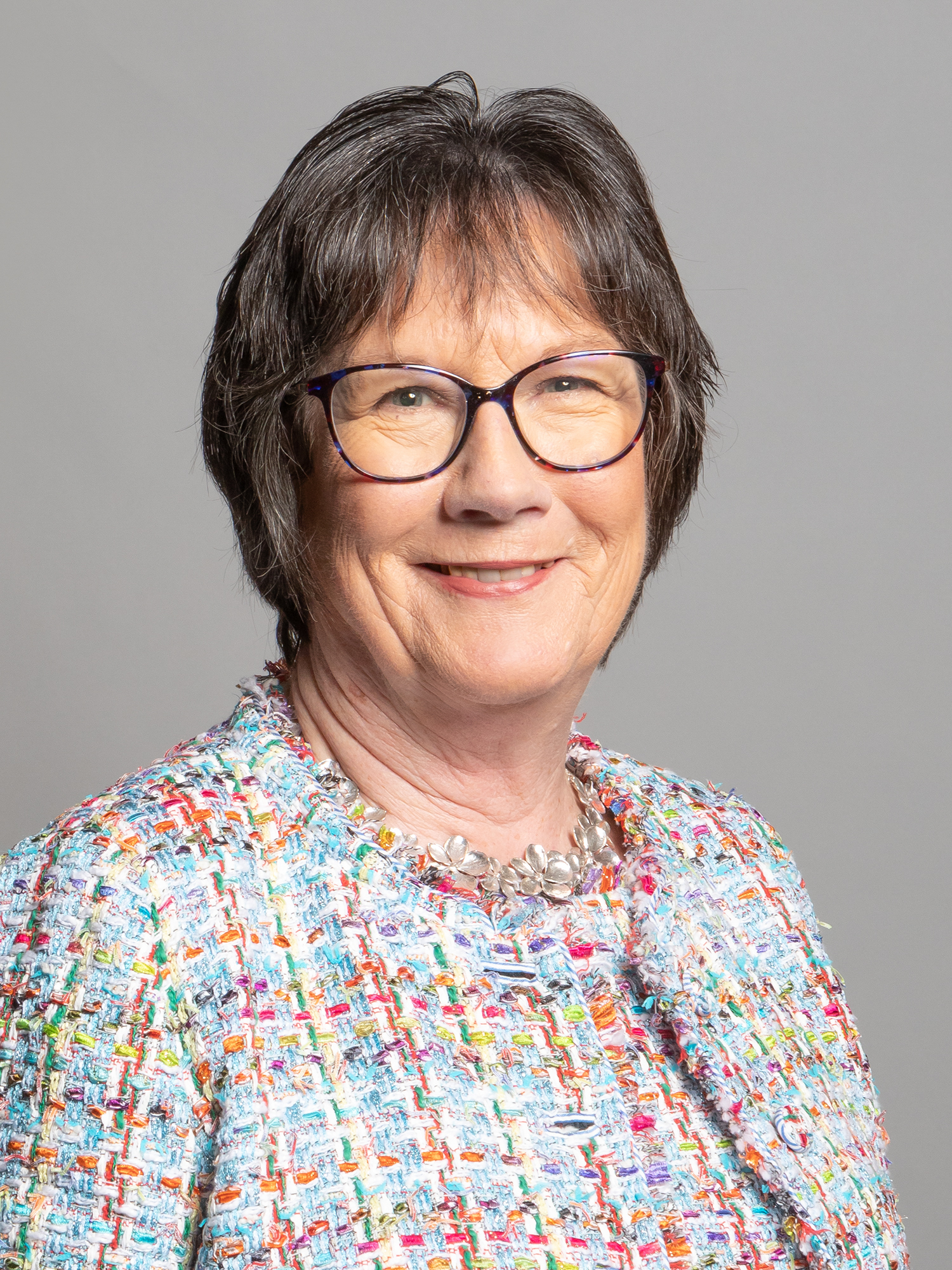
- Official portrait, 2020

Member of Parliament for Mid Derbyshire
- In office 6 May 2010 – 30 May 2024
- Preceded by: Constituency created
- Succeeded by: Jonathan Davies

Personal details
- Born: 4 February 1948 (age 78) Sleaford, Lincolnshire, England
- Party: Conservative
- Spouse: Derek Latham
- Website: paulinelatham.co.uk

Pauline Elizabeth Latham, OBE (born 4 February 1948) is a British Conservative Party politician, who was elected at the 2010 general election as the Member of Parliament (MP) for Mid Derbyshire, serving until she stood down at the 2024 general election.

== Early life ==
Pauline Latham was born on 4 February 1948 in Sleaford, Lincolnshire. She grew up in Nottinghamshire, and her early education was at Bramcote Hills Technical Grammar School. Latham moved to Derbyshire in 1970.

== Political career ==
Latham was a Conservative member of Derbyshire County Council from 1987 to 1993, and was a Derby City Councillor from 1992 to 1996 and from 1998 to 2010. She held the position of Mayor of Derby during 2007/08. She was also a governor of Ecclesbourne School for 12 years.

Latham stood as a Conservative candidate for the 1999 European Parliament election for the East Midlands, but was not elected. She again stood for the East Midlands in the 2004 European Parliament election, but was again not elected.

At the 2001 general election, Latham stood as the Conservative candidate in Broxtowe, coming second with 36.7% of the vote behind the incumbent Labour MP Nick Palmer.

== Parliamentary career ==
Latham was added to the A-List of high priority Conservative candidates created by David Cameron, and she was selected as the candidate for Mid Derbyshire. At the 2010 general election, Latham was elected to Parliament as MP for Mid Derbyshire with 48.3% of the vote and a majority of 11,292.

In Parliament, she has served on the select committee for International Development.

At the 2015 general election, Latham was re-elected as MP for Mid Derbyshire with an increased vote share of 52.2% and an increased majority of 12,774.

Latham voted for Brexit in the 2016 referendum. She subsequently became a member of the European Research Group.

In February 2017, Latham said that other governments across Europe should be looking after refugee children from Calais in their jurisdictions, not Britain. She said that refugee children were not under threat of murder, that they were in safe countries, and other governments should deal with them.

At the snap 2017 general election, Latham was again re-elected, with an increased vote share of 58.6% and a decreased majority of 11,616.

Latham voted for then Prime Minister Theresa May's Brexit withdrawal agreement on 29 March 2019. She supported Esther McVey in the 2019 Conservative Party leadership election.

Latham was again re-elected at the 2019 general election, with an increased vote share of 58.8% and an increased majority of 15,385.

In the fifty-seventh Parliament, she sponsored the Marriage and Civil Partnership (Minimum Age) Bill, which would raise the legal age for marriage from 16 to 18.

Following an interim report on the connections between colonialism and properties now in the care of the National Trust, including links with historic slavery, Latham was among the signatories of a letter to The Telegraph in November 2020 from the "Common Sense Group" of Conservative Parliamentarians. The letter accused the National Trust of being "coloured by cultural Marxist dogma".

In March 2023, Latham announced she would stand down at the 2024 general election.

== Personal life ==
Latham has lived in Derbyshire since 1970. She is married to the architect Derek Latham.

Their son Ben died aged 44 in 2018 of an aortic dissection. She has since campaigned for greater awareness of the condition.

== Honours and awards ==
- Ukraine:
  - August 23, 2019: Third Class of the Order of Merit of Ukraine

Parliament of the United Kingdom
New constituency	Member of Parliament for Mid Derbyshire; 2010–2024	Succeeded by Jonathan Davies
