= George Walker Thomson =

Scottish trade unionist

George Walker Thomson (1883 – 7 July 1949) was a Scottish trade unionist.

Born in Glasgow, Thomson studied at Allan Glen's School and the Glasgow School of Art. During this time, he became a supporter of guild socialism, and for a while was secretary of the Clarion Scouts in the city.

Although he began working as a model builder, he soon followed his father into engineering, completing an apprenticeship with Ross & Duncan before studying at the Royal Technical College. He then worked as a draughtsman designing boilers and joined the new Association of Engineering and Shipbuilding Draughtsmen (AESD). He was elected to its executive in 1917, where was a close associate of general secretary Peter Doig, who had studied with Thomson at the School of Art, and he became the union's convenor later the same year.

During World War I, Thomson was joint editor of The Guildsman, the Glasgow publication of the National Guilds League. This experience enabled him to become editor of the AESD's revived publication, The Draughtsman, in 1918, working full-time on the publication from 1920 until 1948, when he retired due to poor health.

In 1935, Thomson was elected to the General Council of the Trades Union Congress (TUC), and he served as President of the TUC in 1946/47 He was also active in the National Federation of Professional Workers and the Labour Party, where he was secretary of the Science Advisory Committee.

Trade union offices
Preceded by George Lathan	President of the National Federation of Professional Workers; 1937 – 1948	Succeeded by Anne Godwin
Preceded by Walter Citrine	Trades Union Congress representative to the American Federation of Labour; 1941; With: Edward Hough	Succeeded by Bryn Roberts and Jack Tanner
Preceded by Charles Dukes	President of the Trades Union Congress; 1946/47	Succeeded by Florence Hancock
