= John Hancock (British politician) =

British politician

Member of Parliament
- In office 15 July 1909 – 6 December 1923
- Preceded by: James Alfred Jacoby
- Succeeded by: Herbert Wragg
- Constituency: Mid Derbyshire (1909–1918); Belper (1918–1923)

Personal details
- Born: John George Hancock; 15 October 1857
- Died: 19 July 1940 (aged 82)
- Party: Liberal (1915–1940)
- Other political affiliations: Labour (1909–1915)
- Spouse: Mary Hoten
- Parent: Joseph Hancock (father)

John George Hancock (15 October 1857 – 19 July 1940) was a Liberal and sometimes Labour Party politician and Trade Unionist in the United Kingdom.

== Background ==
He was the eldest son of Joseph Hancock of Pinxton, Derbyshire. In 1882 he married Mary Hoten of Pinxton.

== Early career ==
Hancock worked at a pit as a boy. He formed the Pinxton Branch of the Nottinghamshire Miners' Association. In 1893 he became the General Secretary of the Nottinghamshire Miners' Association. He became a miners agent and the miners association Financial Secretary in 1896.

== Political career ==
He was elected as (MP) for Mid Derbyshire at a by-election in July 1909, as a Lib-Lab candidate, sponsored by the Derbyshire Miners Association. Hancock held the seat and managed a slightly reduced majority.

Later in 1909, he was one of a group of Miners Union sponsored Liberal MPs who were instructed by the Miners Federation of Great Britain to take the Labour party whip in the House of Commons and stand at the following election as Labour party candidates. Hancock held the seat at the following General election under his new party label.

He served as a Justice of the Peace in Nottinghamshire. Relations between the Labour and Liberal parties deteriorated after 1910 and they were expected to field candidates against each other in some cases at the next election, anticipated to be in 1915. Hancock decided that he would rather defend his seat as a Liberal, so crossed the floor in 1915 to re-join the Liberals. During the war he combined with future Labour MP George Spencer to attempt to take the Nottinghamshire Miners Association out of the Miners Federation of Great Britain political fund. He was then returned unopposed for the new Belper constituency. In 1921, after 25 years service, he stood down from the post of Financial Secretary of the Nottinghamshire Miners Association, but continued as a miners agent. He held the seat again at the 1922 election, this time, for the first time, against a Labour Party opponent.

However, he was defeated at the 1923 general election by the Conservative Party candidate, Herbert Wragg.

Aged 65, he did not stand for Parliament again. In 1927, following the General Strike, there was a split in the Nottinghamshire miners and Hancock followed the Association's General Secretary and Labour MP, George Spencer in the creation of the more moderate Nottinghamshire Miners' Industrial Union. Hancock became the breakaway union's Treasurer, serving until 1937 when the two miners organisations reunited.

=== Elections contested ===
==== UK Parliament elections ====
Date of election	Constituency	Party	Votes	%	Result
1909	Mid Derbyshire	Lib-Lab	6,735	60.5	Elected
1910 (Jan)	Mid Derbyshire	Labour	7,575	63.9	Elected
1910 (Dec)	Mid Derbyshire	Labour	6,557	60.5	Elected
1918	Belper	Liberal	Unopposed		Elected
1922	Belper	Liberal	12,494	61.1	Elected
1923	Belper	Liberal	6,178	26.7	Not Elected (3rd)

Parliament of the United Kingdom
Preceded by Sir James Alfred Jacoby	Member of Parliament for Mid Derbyshire; 1909–1918	Constituency abolished
New constituency	Member of Parliament for Belper; 1918–1923	Succeeded by Herbert Wragg
Trade union offices
Preceded by William Bailey	General Secretary of the Nottinghamshire Miners' Association; 1893–1897	Succeeded by Aaron Stewart
