= John W. Stephenson =

British trade unionist

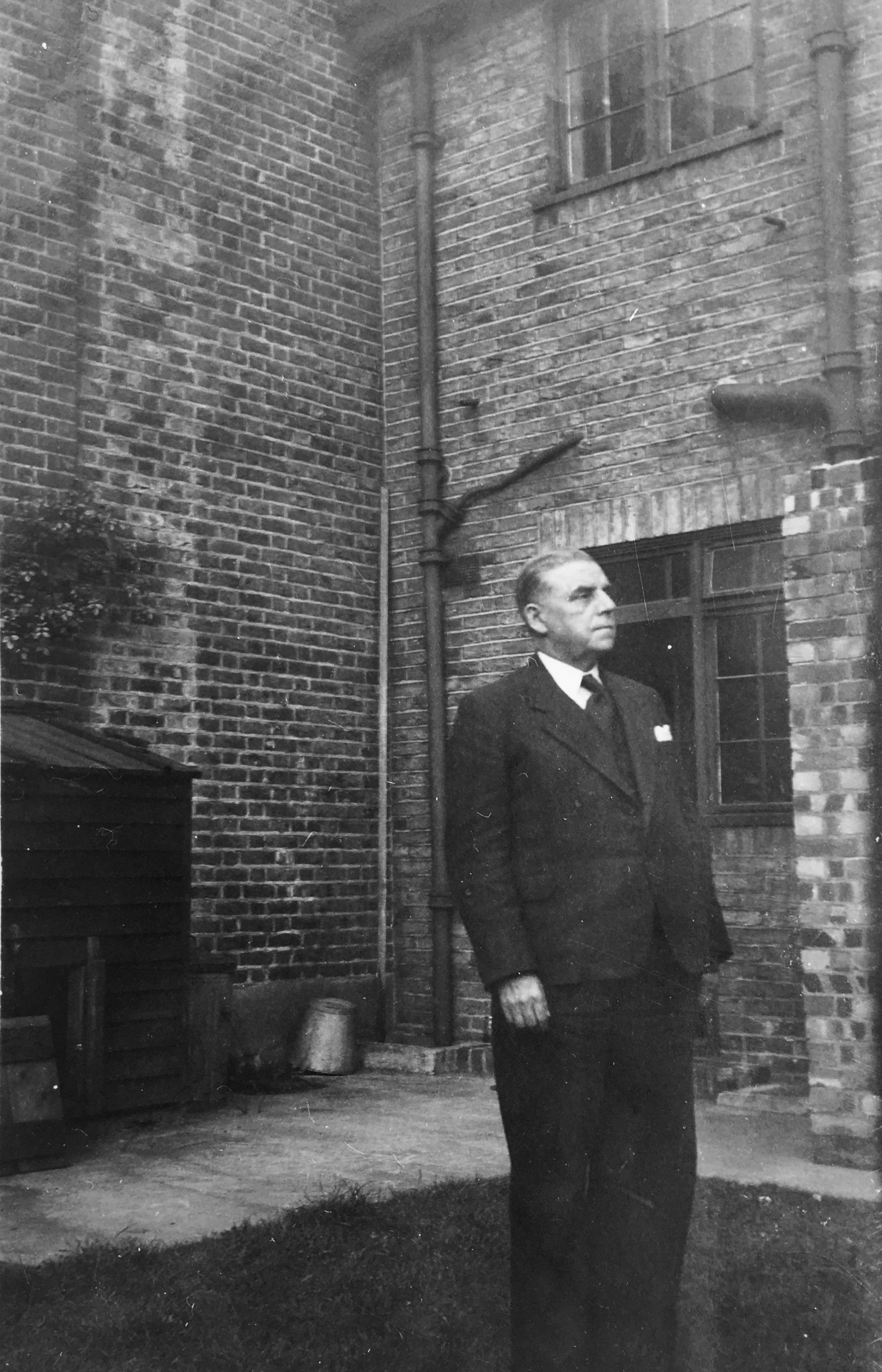
John W. Stephenson

Sir John Walker Stephenson CBE (1888 – 15 May 1960) was a British trade unionist.

Born in Northumberland, Stephenson completed an apprenticeship as a plumber and joined the United Operative Plumbers and Domestic Engineers Association of Great Britain and Ireland. He was active in the union for many years before winning election as its general secretary in 1929.

As general secretary, Stephenson was prominent in the wider trade union movement, serving as the Trades Union Congress' delegate to the American Federation of Labour in 1938, as President of the Confederation of Shipbuilding and Engineering Unions from 1939 to 1941, and as President of the National Federation of Building Trade Operatives from 1941 until 1947.

Alongside his trade union roles, Stephenson was an adviser to the Ministry of Aircraft Production during World War II. He was made a Commander of the Order of the British Empire in 1944 and a knighthood in 1948. In 1949, he stood down from his trade union posts to serve on the Southern Gas Board, then later became chairman of the Eastern Gas Board, retiring in 1959. In 1957, he was Master of the Worshipful Company of Plumbers.

Trade union offices
| Preceded by Lachlan MacDonald | General Secretary of the Plumbers', Glaziers' and Domestic Engineers' Union; 1929 – 1949 | Succeeded by Hugh Kelly |
| Preceded by John C. Little and W. R. Townley | Trades Union Congress representative to the American Federation of Labour; 1938; With: Joseph Jones | Succeeded by Herbert Elvin |
| Preceded by William Westwood | President of the Confederation of Shipbuilding and Engineering Unions; 1939 – 1941 | Succeeded by Harry N. Harrison |
