= William Harold Hutchinson =

British trade unionist/labor party activist

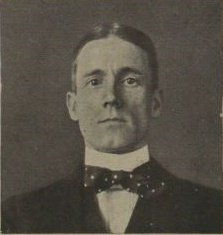
Hutchinson in 1920

William Harold Hutchinson (25 April 1878 – 19 May 1965) was a British trade unionist and Labour Party activist.

Educated to secondary school level, Hutchinson became active in the Amalgamated Society of Engineers, and was first elected to its Executive Council in 1913. The following year, he was also elected to the National Executive Committee of the Labour Party, becoming its chairman in 1920. He stood for the party in Bolton at the 1924 general election, but was not successful.

Unusually for a trade union official, Hutchinson was a supporter of guild socialism, and was close to G. D. H. Cole and the Fabian Society.

In 1925, Hutchinson was elected to London County Council in Woolwich East, although he did not defend his seat at the following election.

From June 1930, Hutchinson was President of the renamed Amalgamated Engineering Union. However, in August 1932, he was removed from office by the Executive Council after it was alleged that Hutchinson had attended a dinner and social gathering organised by Peterborough District of the AEU ‘in a state of intoxication’. In reply, Hutchinson stated ‘that he had an adequate explanation’.

However, following a decision by the union's Final Appeal Court, the Executive Council declared the office of President vacant, and called a new election, in which Hutchinson was not permitted to stand. John C. Little was then duly elected by the end of March 1933.

After his dismissal as president, Hutchinson retained a considerable degree of support from the membership of the AEU. He was elected to the Final Appeal Court in 1934, and then elected as one of the union's full-time National Organisers in 1938.

Hutchinson stood again for the Presidency in 1937 and 1939, on both occasions reaching the second ballot, but then being defeated each time.

Hutchinson retired from full time trade union work in 1943 when he reached the AEU's age limit for full time officials of 65 years old. He then worked as an organiser for the Industrial Orthopaedic Society, before retiring from public life in 1946.

Hutchinson died in Cardiff, aged 87.

Party political offices
| Preceded by John McGurk | Chair of the Labour Party; 1919–1920 | Succeeded by Alexander Gordon Cameron |
Trade union offices
| Preceded by James Thomas Brownlie | President of the Amalgamated Engineering Union; 1930–1932 | Succeeded by John C. Little |
| Preceded by Arthur Deakin and Robert Openshaw | Trades Union Congress representative to the American Federation of Labour; 1948; With: Herbert Bullock | Succeeded by Lincoln Evans and Tom Williamson |
