= George Spencer (Labour politician) =

British politician

George Alfred Spencer

Member of Parliament
- In office 14 December 1918 – 30 May 1929
- Preceded by: Constituency created
- Succeeded by: Frederick Seymour Cocks
- Constituency: Broxtowe

Personal details
- Born: George Alfred Spencer; 1873
- Died: 21 November 1957 (aged 83–84)
- Party: Labour (Before 1926); Liberal (After 1926)

George Alfred Spencer (1873 – 21 November 1957) was an English miner, trade union leader and Member of Parliament from 1918 to 1929 for Broxtowe.

== Family ==
George Spencer was the second son of eighteen children. His youngest daughter was the wife of the director of the NSPCC in the 1930s.

== Trade unionism ==
Spencer was an official of the Nottinghamshire Miners Association, which was affiliated to the Miners Federation of Great Britain. In 1926, at the height of the General Strike, he negotiated on the behalf of the Nottinghamshire Miners Association a deal with the local mine owners at the request of miners from Digby Pit, near Eastwood, in Nottinghamshire. However, that brought him into conflict with the MFGB, which wished to see the strike continue. Unhappy with the influence of the MFGB, he led a breakaway from the NMA and set up the Nottinghamshire and District Miners' Industrial Union (NMIU) based mostly in The Dukeries, which lasted for eleven years separate from the Miners' Federation of Great Britain. In 1937, a merger agreement was reached between the NMA and the NMIU, with Spencer becoming the president of the new organisation.

== Political career ==
During the Great War he combined with fellow Nottinghamshire Miners official and Liberal MP John Hancock to attempt to take the Nottinghamshire Miners Association out of the Miners Federation of Great Britain political fund, as he believed in trade union independence from party political control. He was elected to parliament in 1918 as Labour MP for Broxtowe, and re-elected at the next three general elections. Following the Nottinghamshire miners union split of 1926, he was expelled from the Labour party. He continued to sit in parliament until 1929, speaking from the Liberal party benches. The Broxtowe Labour party, instead of replacing him with another local miners candidate, chose Seymour Cocks, an outsider with no mining background.

Parliament of the United Kingdom
New constituency	Member of Parliament for Broxtowe; 1918 – 1929	Succeeded by Seymour Cocks
Trade union offices
Preceded by John E. Whyatt	President of the Nottinghamshire Miners' Association; 1912–1918	Succeeded by Frank Varley
Preceded by William Carter	General Secretary of the Nottinghamshire Miners' Association; 1918–1926	Succeeded by Frank Varley
Preceded by Bernard Taylor	President of the Nottinghamshire Miners' Association; 1937–1945	Succeeded by Bill Bayliss
