= Jack Tanner (trade unionist) =

British trade unionist (1889–1965)

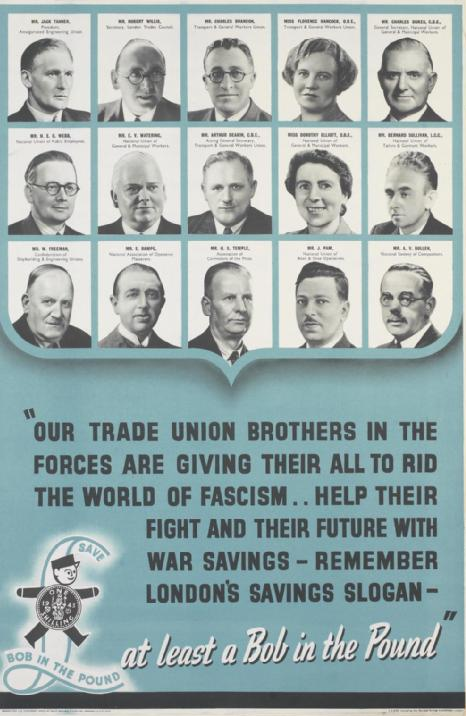
Tanner, first on left top row, in a World War II patriotic poster

Frederick John Shirley Tanner CBE (28 April 1889 – 3 March 1965) was a British trade unionist.

Born in Whitstable, Tanner grew up in London and became a fitter and turner at the age of 14. He joined the Social Democratic Federation and the Amalgamated Society of Engineers, soon becoming a prominent activist, and helping found the National Federation of Women Workers. During the 1910s, he was a leading syndicalist, active in the Industrial Syndicalist Education League, and jointly chaired the First International Syndicalist Congress.

During World War I, Tanner worked as an engineer in France and was active in the then-syndicalist Confédération Générale du Travail. He returned to London in 1917 and became active in the Shop Stewards' Movement, and in 1920 along with others such as John S. Clarke, Helen Crawfurd, Williie Gallacher, William McLaine, JT Murphy, Sylvia Pankhurst, Tom Quelch, Dave Ramsay and Marjory Newbold, attended the Second Congress of the Communist International. He did join the Communist Party of Great Britain but left after only eight months, though he remained close to colleagues who stayed in the party.

Tanner increasingly devoted his time to the trade union movement, and was elected president of the Amalgamated Engineering Union in 1939, serving until 1953 and promoting economic planning in the engineering industry. Increasingly associated with the right wing of the union, he served as president of the Trades Union Congress in 1954, and supported the anti-communist Industrial and Research Information Services from 1956.

Trade union offices
Preceded by John C. Little	President of the Amalgamated Engineering Union; 1939–1953	Succeeded by Robert Openshaw
Preceded by Edward Hough and George Walker Thomson	Trades Union Congress representative to the American Federation of Labour; 1942; With: Bryn Roberts	Succeeded by Bill Bayliss and Harry N. Harrison
Preceded by Tom O'Brien	President of the Trades Union Congress; 1954	Succeeded by Charles Geddes
