= Nottingham North West =

Parliamentary constituency in the United Kingdom, 1950–1955

- Former borough constituency for the House of Commons

1950–1955
- Seats: one
- Created from: Nottingham West
- Replaced by: Nottingham West and Nottingham North

Nottingham North West was a borough constituency in the city of Nottingham. It returned one Member of Parliament (MP) to the House of Commons of the Parliament of the United Kingdom.

== History ==
The constituency was created for the 1950 general election, although in reality this was merely a renaming of the previous Nottingham West seat. It disappeared at the 1955 general election, when its territory was split between the redrawn Nottingham West constituency (Broxtowe and Wollaton wards) and the new Nottingham North constituency (St Albans ward).

== Boundaries ==
The County Borough of Nottingham wards of Broxtowe, St Albans, and Wollaton.

== Members of Parliament ==
Election	Member	Party
1950	Tom O'Brien	Labour
1955	constituency abolished	

== Election results ==
General election 1950: Nottingham North West
Party	Candidate	Votes	%	±%
Labour	Tom O'Brien	30,223	61.19	
Conservative	Thomas Gardner	13,016	26.35	
Liberal	TH Whalley	5,432	11.00	
Communist	Arthur West	719	1.46	
Majority		17,207	34.84	
Turnout		49,390	86.10	
Labour win (new seat)				

General election 1951: Nottingham North West
Party	Candidate	Votes	%	±%
Labour	Tom O'Brien	32,694	64.94	
Conservative	Thomas Gardner	17,650	35.06	
Majority		15,044	29.88	
Turnout		60,392	83.36	
Labour hold		Swing	−2.48	
