= Stanley L. Klos =

American politician

Stan Klos
Personal information
- Born: January 18, 1954 (age 72)
- Listed height: 6 ft 7 in (2.01 m)

Career information
- High school: Madison Township (Middlesex County, New Jersey)
- College: Saint Peter's (1972–1974); Idaho State (1975–1977)
- Position: Power forward / center

Career history
- 197?–197?: Amaro Harrys Bologna

Stanley Yavneh Klos (born January 18, 1954), is an American businessman, historical preservationist, and former basketball player. Klos was a Republican candidate for the U.S. Senate in 1994, challenging Robert C. Byrd for the West Virginia seat. In 2011, he married Naomi Yavneh Klos, Ph.D. and changed his middle name from "Louis" to "Yavneh", his wife's maiden name. The couple reside in New Orleans, where Dr. Naomi Yavneh Klos is the Director of the Loyola New Orleans University Honors Program.

== Early life ==
Klos was born in New York City to Dr. Louis A. Klos, founder of the National Catholic Business Education Association, and Eileen Hundertmark. Klos became interested in historical preservation in his early teens, acquiring antiques at flea markets in the 1960s.

== Basketball career ==
=== College career ===
From 1972 to 1974 Klos played college basketball for St. Peter's College as a forward-center. In 1974, he transferred Idaho State University where he played from 1975 to 1977.

=== Professional career ===
Klos played for Italy's Amaro Harrys Bologna of the Italian Basketball Association. He also was the Captain of the United States Basketball Team which participated in European International Tournaments in 1979.

== Historical preservation ==
In the 1970s he turned his pursuits to classic automobiles.

From the 1980s onwards, Klos began preserving historic properties threatened by demolition, eventually accumulating 32, including properties in New Jersey, West Virginia, Florida and Pennsylvania.

In the 1980s, as a real estate entrepreneur, he acquired RE/MAX of Pennsylvania, managing a marketing mix that increased yearly commission revenue from $240K to $36 million in 12 years. As a Regional Owner, he was involved in the expansion of RE/MAX into the world's largest real estate company.

In the 1990s, Klos began collecting historical documents, and putting these primary sources online at hundreds of URLs named after their notable subjects or authors, such as (benjaminfranklin.org), (fortpitt.org), (worldwarII.org). These documents were re-formed into award-winning exhibits that are featured at museums, universities, and special events all across the United States.

Klos has delivered keynote speeches at numerous events including the grand opening of the Franklin D. Roosevelt American Heritage Center Museum's grand opening and the 2003 re-entombment of First Lady Martha & President Samuel Huntington. His work has appeared in hundreds of print and digital publications including History Channel's Brad Meltzer's Decoded, The Declaration of Independence, U.S. News & World Report 2006 cover story, "Washington? Get In Line" & the Discovery Channel's "Unsolved History: Plots To Kill Lincoln."

In 2004, Klos, as a board member of the James Monroe Foundation (JMF), proposed that the foundation acquire and restore the family farm and birthplace of President James Monroe. On April 4, 2005, Westmoreland County signed a 99-year lease with JMF, and Klos was appointed Chairman of the James Monroe Birthplace Commission. Under the stewardship of the JMF President G. William Thomas, archaeologists from the College of William & Mary began the site study for restoration in 2006.

Klos was co-founder of The James Monroe Scholarship Award established in 2001 by the James Monroe Foundation. The award is an annual essay contest for juniors and seniors enrolled in a public, private or home-school high school programs. All 1st-, 2nd- and 3rd-place essays are posted online at jamesmonroe.org.

Klos is the co-founder of Dinosaur Safaris, Inc., in Shell, Wyoming. The company is headed by paleontologist Bob Simon. Under Simon's stewardship, four fully articulated dinosaurs–Camarasaurus, Stegosaurus, Diplodocus, and Camptosaurus–have been discovered.

== Authorial activities ==
President Who? Forgotten Founders examines the origins of the U.S. Presidency and includes biographies of four Presidents of the Continental Congress and ten Presidents of the United States in Congress Assembled serving before George Washington from 1774- 1788. Featuring many pre-1789 letters, resolutions, treaties, and laws signed as President of the United States, the book relies heavily on primary sources as evidence the office existed before 1789.

America's Four Republics: The More or Less United States tells the story of the 15-year founding period of the United States, and details Klos' views about the different concepts of the American Republic which were held at the time.

== Virtualology ==
In 1999 Klos founded The Virtualology Project, a website hosting historical documents, art, natural history research and biographies. It hosts a copyrighted, edited version of Appletons' Cyclopædia of American Biography under its FamousAmericans.net website. Virtualology created an online educational venue where students published their work on the relevant websites. It was on the "Hot Sites" list for USA Today.

== Politics ==
Klos served as West Virginia Republican State Executive Committee Finance Chairman from 1992 to 1994. During this period annual contributions grew by 750%.

In 1994, Klos was the Republican Nominee for West Virginia in the US Senate elections, having defeated physician Arthur R. Gindin in the primary by 61% to 39%. Klos campaigned as a "sacrificial lamb" against veteran Democrat Robert C. Byrd, as part of the Republican U.S. Senatorial Committee's strategy to re-capture a majority in the United States Senate in 1994. This strategy was successful, as although Byrd was elected with 69% to Stan Klos' 31%, he spent $1,550,354 to Klos' $267,165. Additionally, the Democratic Party invested over $1 million in West Virginia's U.S. Senatorial Campaign, compared to the Republican Party's $15,000. The Republicans duly won a majority in the U.S. Senate. The campaign received attention for the hiring of an actor to play Robert C. Byrd in staged Statewide Debates when the Byrd refused Klos's invitation for a series of formal Senatorial Debates. The campaign also organized successful demonstrations against the Clintons' National Health Care Bus as it traveled through West Virginia in the summer of 1994. When the bill debated in the Senate, Senator Byrd opposed the approval of the National Health Care measure while the bus was completing its tour in the state. However, on Klos's instruction the campaign did not implement the "Death by a Thousand Cuts" plan proposed by strategists, which was later favourably acknowledged by Senator Byrd.

In 1996 Klos was a nominee for State Treasurer, recruited by West Virginia Republican Party Chairman Steve La Rose. During this campaign, Klos uncovered a scheme to circumvent the State Constitution's ban on investing State funds into equities. Klos challenged the "West Virginia Trust Fund", which was subsequently declared unconstitutional by the West Virginia Supreme Court on February 25, 1997. The following year an amendment to the State Constitution allowing equity investments was proposed to the voters and passed by a 71 to 29 percent margin. The Wheeling News-Register commented favourably on Klos's efforts in an editorial entitled "Klos Took A Stand Based on What is Right".

Party political offices
Preceded by Jay Wolfe	Republican nominee for U.S. Senator from West Virginia (Class 1); 1994	Succeeded by David Gallaher
Preceded by H.C. "Hank" Viglianco	Republican nominee for West Virginia State Treasurer; 1996	Vacant Title next held by Bob Adams
