= James Alfred Jacoby =

British politician

James Alfred Jacoby

Sir James Alfred Jacoby (1852–1909) was a Nottingham lace manufacturer and Liberal politician who sat in the House of Commons from 1885 to 1909.

Jacoby was the son of Moritz Jacoby, a lace manufacturer of Nottingham and was educated privately. He and his two brothers became directors of M. Jacoby & Co lace company and were active in local commerce and politics. Jacoby was a member of Nottingham Town Council from 1876 and was Sheriff of Nottingham for 1877. He was president of the Nottingham Chamber of Commerce, chairman of the Technical Schools Committee, and vice-chairman of the Castle Museum Committee. He was also member of Royal Statistical Society.

At the 1885 general election, Jacoby was elected as Liberal Member of Parliament for Mid Derbyshire. He held the seat until his death in 1909.

Jacoby and his brothers all collected art and antiques which they donated to Nottingham Castle Museum.

Jacoby married Miss F. Leipmann of Glasgow in 1883. They lived at Normanton House, Normanton-on-the-Wolds, Nottinghamshire.

He was Jewish.

Parliament of the United Kingdom
New constituency	Member of Parliament for Mid Derbyshire; 1885–1909	Succeeded by John George Hancock
