= Walter Lewis (trade unionist) =

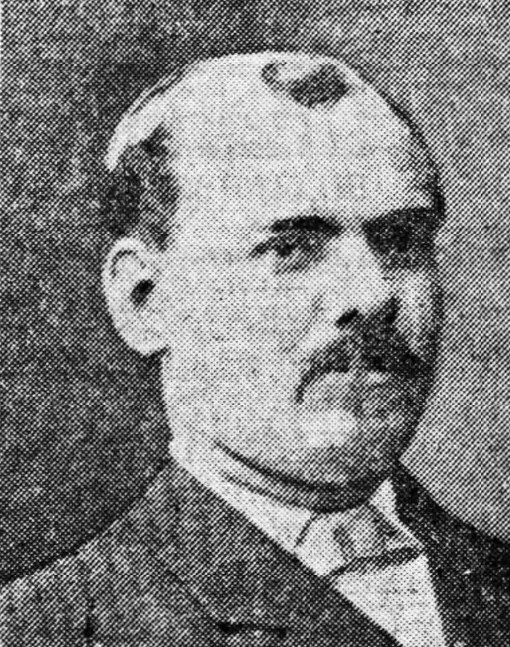
Lewis in 1909

Walter Lewis (died 12 February 1926) was a Welsh trade union leader and politician.

Born in Tredegar, Lewis began working at a coal mine when he was just nine years old. Ten years later, he was working at the Holly Bush Colliery, when a dispute arose over wages, and he was chosen as one of the workers' representatives in the resulting negotiations. He later moved to work at the Coedymoeth Colliery in Brithdir, winning election as checkweighman, and he became involved in the Rhymney Valley Miners' Association.

During the Welsh coal strike of 1898, Lewis was delegated to raise donations from northern England. He proved successful in the role, and when the South Wales Miners' Federation was established, later in the year, he served as the first president of its Rhymney Valley District, then as assistant to its general secretary, William O'Shea. In 1902, O'Shea resigned, and Lewis was elected as his successor. He relocated to Bargoed, and moved to sit on Gelligaer Council.

Lewis was also politically active, joining the Independent Labour Party, and serving on Bedwellty Urban District Council, including a year as its vice-chair. He was not, as was usual, then nominated as the council's chair, which led the union to make an official protest.

In 1909, the Rhymney Valley miners' agent, Evan Thomas, died. Lewis defeated five other candidates to win election as Thomas' replacement, representing 10,000 miners. At the 1910 Glamorgan County Council election, he stood in the Bargoed ward, but was not elected.

Lewis also served for six years as president of the New Tredegar and District Co-operative Society. In his spare time, he served as a deacon at the Welsh Baptist Church in Gilfach. From 1914, he also served as a magistrate. He died in 1926, while still in office as a miners' agent.

Trade union offices
Preceded by William O'Shea	Secretary of the Rhymney Valley District of the South Wales Miners' Federation; 1902–1909	Succeeded by Albert Thomas
Preceded by Evan Thomas	Agent for the Rhymney Valley District of the South Wales Miners' Federation; 1909–1926	Succeeded by Bryn Roberts
