= Mid Derbyshire =

UK Parliament constituency (1885–1918; 2010 onwards)

Coordinates: 52.95°N 1.40°W

- County constituency for the House of Commons
- Interactive map of boundaries since 2024
- Location within the East Midlands
- County: Derbyshire
- Electorate: 70,085 (March 2020)
- Major settlements: Belper, Duffield Oakwood

Current constituency
- Created: 2010
- Member of Parliament: Jonathan Davies (Labour)
- Created from: Amber Valley, Erewash and Derby North

1885–1918
- Type of constituency: County constituency
- Created from: South Derbyshire
- Replaced by: Belper

Mid Derbyshire is a constituency (Note: A county constituency (for the purposes of election expenses and type of returning officer)) represented in the House of Commons of the UK Parliament. The Member of Parliament has been Jonathan Davies of the Labour Party since the 2024 general election. As with all constituencies, the constituency elects one Member of Parliament (MP) by the first past the post system of election at least every five years.

The previous MP was Pauline Latham, a Conservative, from 2010 until she stood down in 2024.

== Constituency profile ==
Mid Derbyshire is a constituency in Derbyshire. It covers some northern and eastern suburbs of Derby (Allestree, Oakwood and Spondon) and rural areas north and east of the city, including the town of Belper and the villages of Duffield, West Hallam and Borrowash.

Belper has an industrial heritage as one of the Industrial Revolution's first textile mill towns. The constituency has low levels of deprivation and is generally affluent, particularly so in Allestree and Oakwood, which are relatively modern suburban developments. Allestree contains the main campus of the University of Derby. House prices are lower than the national average but higher than the rest of the East Midlands.

Mid Derbyshire has a high average age due to its large retiree population. Residents have high rates of education, homeownership and income, and the child poverty rate is low. A high proportion of residents work in the education and retail sectors and few claim unemployment benefits. White people made up 95% of the population at the 2021 census.

At the local council level, Belper and Duffield are mostly represented by Labour Party and Green Party representatives, whilst the rural areas, villages and Derby suburbs elected Conservative councillors. An estimated 53% of voters in Mid Derbyshire supported leaving the European Union in the 2016 referendum, similar to the nationwide figure of 52%.

== Boundaries ==
=== 2010–2024 ===
Following their review of parliamentary representation, the Boundary Commission for England created this seat for the 2010 general election. Neighbouring constituencies had consequential boundary changes, with Erewash and Amber Valley the most affected.

The constituency was made up of the following electoral wards:

- Belper Central; Belper East; Belper North; Belper South; Duffield, part of the borough of Amber Valley
- Allestree, Oakwood and Spondon, part of the City of Derby
- Little Eaton and Breadsall; Ockbrook and Borrowash; Stanley; West Hallam and Dale Abbey, part of the borough of Erewash^{1}

^{1} Further to a local government boundary review in Erewash which became effective in May 2015, the Stanley ward was merged into Little Eaton and Breadsall which was renamed Little Eaton and Stanley.

=== Current ===
Following the 2023 review of Westminster constituencies, which came into effect for the 2024 general election, the constituency was expanded by adding the South West Parishes ward in the Borough of Amber Valley (as it existed on 1 December 2020), transferred from Derbyshire Dales.

Taking account of local government boundary reviews in Amber Valley and Derby which came into effect in May 2023, the constituency now comprises the following:

- The Borough of Amber Valley wards of: Alport & South West Parishes (part); Belper East; Belper North; Belper South; Duffield & Quarndon.
- The City of Derby wards of: Allestree; Chaddesden North (small part); Oakwood (most); Spondon.
- The Borough of Erewash wards of: Little Eaton & Stanley; Ockbrook & Borrowash; West Hallam & Dale Abbey.

== Members of Parliament ==
=== MPs 1885–1918 ===
South Derbyshire prior to 1885

Election	Member	Party
1885	Sir James Alfred Jacoby	Liberal
1909	John Hancock	Labour
1915	John Hancock	Liberal
1918	constituency abolished	

=== MPs since 2010 ===
Amber Valley, Erewash and Derby North prior to 2010

Election	Member	Party
2010	Pauline Latham	Conservative
2024	Jonathan Davies	Labour

== Elections ==
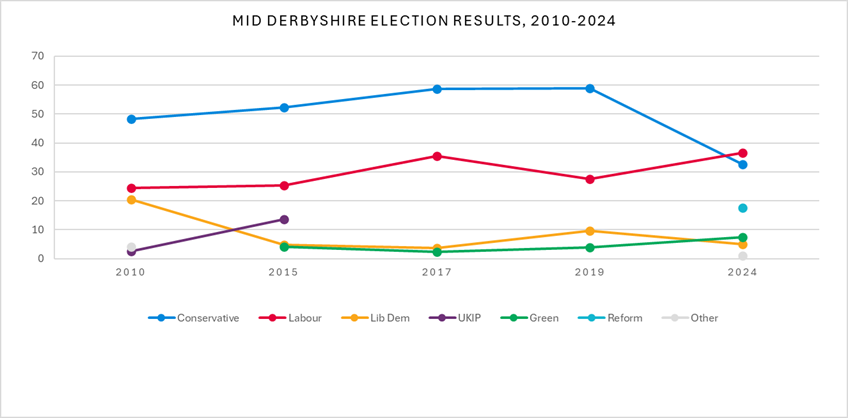
Mid Derbyshire election results 1983-2024

=== Elections in the 2020s ===
General election 2024: Mid Derbyshire
Party	Candidate	Votes	%	±%
Labour	Jonathan Davies	17,346	36.5	+9.5
Conservative	Luke Gardiner	15,468	32.5	−27.1
Reform	Stephen Dean	8,356	17.6	N/A
Green	Gez Kinsella	3,547	7.5	+3.6
Liberal Democrats	Barry Holliday	2,361	5.0	−4.6
Independent	Sue Warren	315	0.7	N/A
Workers Party	Josiah Uche	150	0.3	N/A
Majority		1,878	4.0	N/A
Turnout		47,543	68.6	−4.6
Registered electors		69,281		
Labour gain from Conservative		Swing	▲18.3	

=== Elections in the 2010s ===
2019 general election: Mid Derbyshire
Party	Candidate	Votes	%	±%
Conservative	Pauline Latham	29,027	58.8	+0.2
Labour	Emma Monkman	13,642	27.6	−7.9
Liberal Democrats	Felix Dodds	4,756	9.6	+6.0
Green	Sue MacFarlane	1,931	3.9	+1.6
Majority		15,385	31.2	+8.1
Turnout		49,356	73.2	−1.4
Conservative hold		Swing	+4.05	

2017 general election: Mid Derbyshire
Party	Candidate	Votes	%	±%
Conservative	Pauline Latham	29,513	58.6	+6.4
Labour	Alison Martin	17,897	35.5	+10.1
Liberal Democrats	Adam Wain	1,793	3.6	−1.2
Green	Sue MacFarlane	1,168	2.3	−1.7
Majority		11,616	23.1	−3.7
Turnout		50,461	74.6	+4.0
Conservative hold		Swing	-1.35	

2015 general election: Mid Derbyshire
Party	Candidate	Votes	%	±%
Conservative	Pauline Latham	24,908	52.2	+3.9
Labour	Nicola Heaton	12,134	25.4	+0.9
UKIP	Martin Fitzpatrick	6,497	13.6	+11.0
Liberal Democrats	Hilary Jones	2,292	4.8	−15.7
Green	Sue MacFarlane	1,898	4.0	New
Majority		12,774	26.8	+3.0
Turnout		47,729	70.6	−0.8
Conservative hold		Swing	+1.45	

2010 general election: Mid Derbyshire
Party	Candidate	Votes	%	±%
Conservative	Pauline Latham	22,877	48.3	+1.1
Labour	Hardyal Dhindsa	11,585	24.5	−10.2
Liberal Democrats	Sally McIntosh	9,711	20.5	+4.5
BNP	Lewis Allsebrook	1,698	3.6	New
UKIP	Anthony Kay	1,252	2.6	+0.5
Monster Raving Loony	R.U.Seerius	219	0.5	New
Majority		11,292	23.8	+11.3
Turnout		47,342	71.4	+4.9
Conservative hold		Swing	+5.65	

Note: This constituency was a notional hold in 2010, as it would likely have been won by the Conservatives in 2005 had it existed then. This is despite the fact all of the wards were actually within constituencies that Labour held in 2005.

=== Elections in the 1910s ===
General Election 1914–15:

Another General Election was required to take place before the end of 1915. The political parties had been making preparations for an election to take place and by July 1914, the following candidates had been selected;

- Liberal: John Hancock
- Unionist:

December 1910 general election: Mid Derbyshire
Party	Candidate	Votes	%	±%
Labour	John Hancock	6,557	60.5	−3.4
Conservative	David Rhys	4,287	39.5	+3.4
Majority		2,270	21.0	−6.8
Turnout		10,844	79.4	−7.2
Labour hold		Swing	-3.4	

January 1910 general election: Mid Derbyshire
Party	Candidate	Votes	%	±%
Labour	John Hancock	7,557	63.9	+3.4
Conservative	Francis Francis	4,268	36.1	−3.4
Majority		3,289	27.8	+6.8
Turnout		11.825	86.6	+2.6
Labour hold		Swing	+3.4	

=== Elections in the 1900s ===
1909 Mid Derbyshire by-election
Party	Candidate	Votes	%	±%
Lib-Lab	John Hancock	6,735	60.5	−6.5
Conservative	Samuel Cresswell	4,392	39.5	+6.5
Majority		2,343	21.0	−13.0
Turnout		11,127	84.0	+1.4
Registered electors		13,244		
Lib-Lab hold		Swing	+6.5	

- Hancock, who was sponsored by the Derbyshire Miners Association was chosen by the local Liberal Association as their candidate. During the campaign he agreed that he would sign the Labour Party constitution, so some records describe him as the Labour party candidate.

Jacoby

1906 general election: Mid Derbyshire
Party	Candidate	Votes	%	±%
Liberal	James Alfred Jacoby	7,065	67.0	+10.5
Conservative	Samuel Cresswell	3,475	33.0	−10.5
Majority		3,590	34.0	+21.0
Turnout		10,540	82.6	−0.4
Registered electors		12,757		
Liberal hold		Swing	+10.5	

1900 general election: Mid Derbyshire
Party	Candidate	Votes	%	±%
Liberal	James Alfred Jacoby	5,323	56.5	+3.4
Conservative	Henry Raikes	4,094	43.5	−3.4
Majority		1,229	13.0	+6.8
Turnout		9,417	83.0	−5.5
Registered electors		11,347		
Liberal hold		Swing	+3.4	

=== Elections in the 1890s ===
Jacoby

1895 general election: Mid Derbyshire
Party	Candidate	Votes	%	±%
Liberal	James Alfred Jacoby	4,926	53.1	−2.5
Conservative	William Bridgeman	4,351	46.9	+2.5
Majority		575	6.2	−5.0
Turnout		9,277	88.5	+9.1
Registered electors		10,479		
Liberal hold		Swing	-2.5	

1892 general election: Mid Derbyshire
Party	Candidate	Votes	%	±%
Liberal	James Alfred Jacoby	4,899	55.6	+0.4
Conservative	John Satterfield Sandars	3,907	44.4	−0.4
Majority		992	11.2	+0.8
Turnout		8,806	79.4	−7.1
Registered electors		11,089		
Liberal hold		Swing	+0.4	

=== Elections in the 1880s ===
1886 general election: Mid Derbyshire
Party	Candidate	Votes	%	±%
Liberal	James Alfred Jacoby	4,569	55.2	−8.8
Liberal Unionist	Charles Seely	3,706	44.8	+8.8
Majority		863	10.4	−17.6
Turnout		8,275	86.5	−2.5
Registered electors		9,571		
Liberal hold		Swing	-8.8	

1885 general election: Mid Derbyshire
Party	Candidate	Votes	%	±%
Liberal	James Alfred Jacoby	5,447	64.0	
Conservative	John Burton Barrow	3,067	36.0	
Majority		2,380	28.0	
Turnout		8,514	89.0	
Registered electors		9,571		
Liberal win (new seat)				

== See also ==
- Parliamentary constituencies in Derbyshire
