= Derbyshire and Nottinghamshire Miners' Association =

The Derbyshire and Nottinghamshire Miners' Association was an early union representing coal miners in parts of the East Midlands of England.

The union was founded around the turn of 1863 and 1864 by two miners: William Ball, and one other who died shortly after establishing the union. The union attracted hostility from mine owners, and members risked victimisation, so it initially operated secretively. Most of its early members had previously been part of a short-lived union established in 1844, but by 1866, the new union had only 300 members.

The union affiliated to the Miners' National Union (MNU), and in 1866, it sent William Brown to the area as a full-time organiser, intending to operate publicly and attract new members. He was enormously successful, bringing membership up to 7,000 within a year. He worked with local Methodist preachers, who led hymn-singing at union meetings, and also organised co-operation with the neighbouring South Yorkshire Miners' Association (SYMA).

In response to the newly confident union, mineowners in Staveley sacked 500 workers for union membership, out of a total workforce of 1,800 in the town. Owners in Hucknall and Kimberley then locked out miners, and the three areas brought in strikebreakers from across Britain. The union counterclaimed for a working day of less than 12 hours, and when being paid by the ton, for this to be based on 21 cwt, not 28 cwt.

The dispute continued into 1867, with the local union receiving support from the MNU, the Organised Trades Association of Nottingham and the London Trades Council, but by the summer, funds were running low, and most of the strikers had either agreed to leave the union, or had moved away to find work elsewhere. At the start of the year, the union remained strong in south Derbyshire, but in February, owners started a lock-out there. Union members remained solid for over a year, but when union funds ran out in March 1868, they had to admit defeat.

By the end of 1868, union membership was down to under 500, mostly based at Cinderhill. Remaining members in south Derbyshire split away to form their own district of the MNU.

From 1870, membership of the union began to slowly increase, and William Peach became its new secretary. In 1873, an early conciliation board was set up with the Butterley Company in an attempt to avoid industrial action, but this was unable to resolve various matters, leading to a strike in 1874 and another in 1875. The second strike was again defeated, and the union became moribund, remaining members in Derbyshire joining the SYMA.

Although inactive, the union remained in existence until around 1880, when the new Nottinghamshire Miners' Association and Derbyshire Miners' Association were founded.
