= Joe Whelan =

Irish trade union leader

Joseph Patrick Whelan (1 March 1925 – 30 August 1982) was an Irish trade union leader, active in England.

Born in Dun Laoghaire, Whelan joined the Royal Air Force in 1940, relocating to England. He served throughout World War II, and met Ethel Goodman, from Hucknall in Nottinghamshire. The two married in 1945, and settled in Hucknall, Whelan becoming a coal miner at the Lindby Colliery. In 1949, he joined the Communist Party of Great Britain (CPGB), standing unsuccessfully for it in several local elections.

Whelan was active in the Nottingham Area of the National Union of Mineworkers, and first stood to become a full-time official in the union in 1964. He lost narrowly on the second ballot, and lost an appeal for a re-vote. During this process, a communist and trade union official from Lindby, Les Ellis, died, and Whelan won the contest to replace him, campaigning for improved pay and conditions. Although he was controversial within the generally moderate area, he remained a full-time official, and from 1971 also served on the National Executive Committee of the National Union of Mineworkers (NUM). In 1977, he became the general secretary of the area, in which position he strongly supported Arthur Scargill.

Early in 1982, Whelan suffered a heart attack. He returned to work, but died later in the year.

Trade union offices
Preceded by Len Martin	General Secretary of the Nottingham Area of the National Union of Mineworkers; 1977–1982	Succeeded by Henry Richardson
