= Arthur Pugh =

British trade unionist

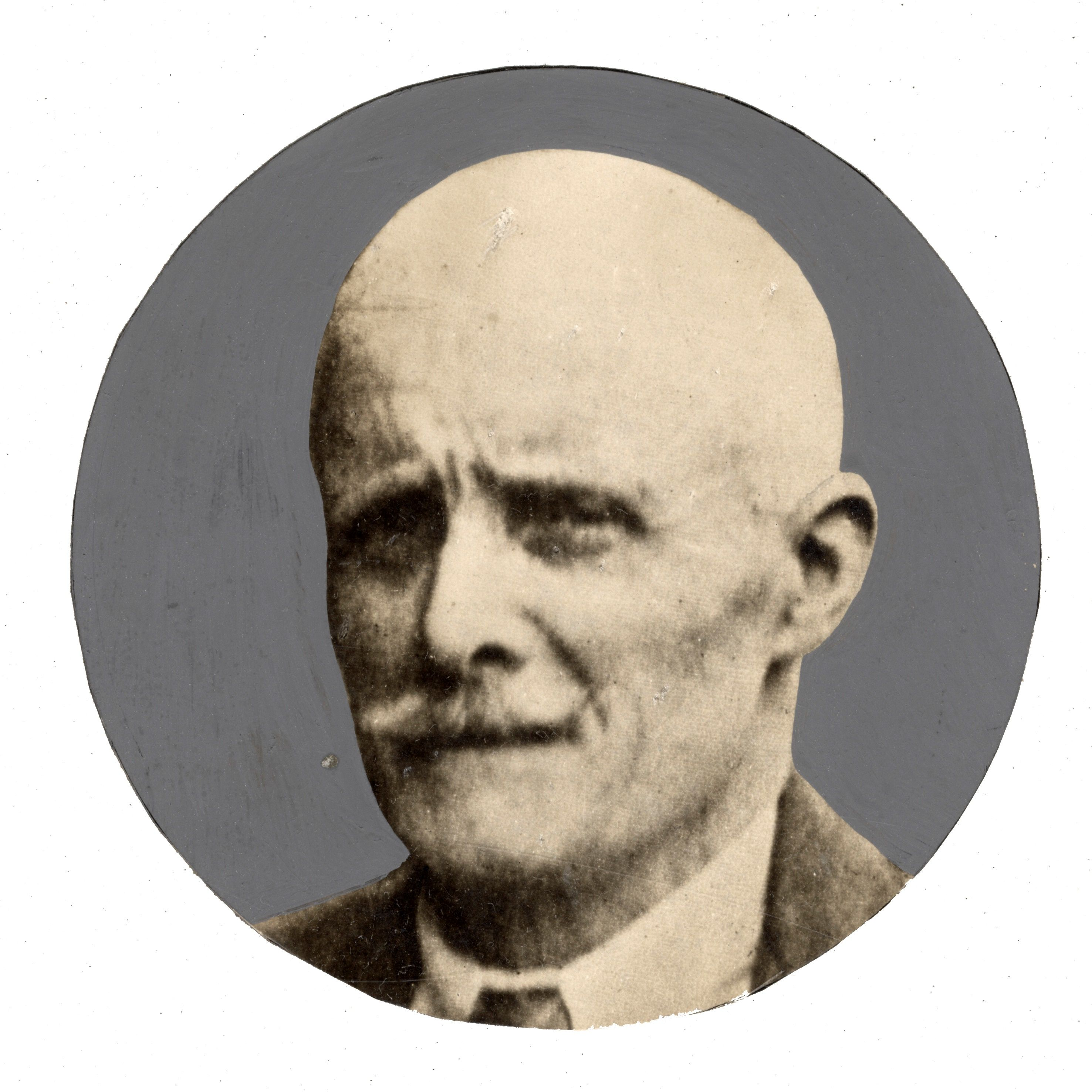
Arthur Pugh

Sir Arthur Pugh CBE (19 January 1870 – 2 August 1955) was a British trade unionist.

Born in Ross-on-Wye, Pugh was apprenticed to a farmer who also worked as a butcher, but soon moved to Neath to work in the steel industry, where he became active in the British Steel Smelters' Association. In 1901, he moved to Frodingham, Lincolnshire, and he became first Assistant Secretary and then Office Secretary of the union. In 1917, he played a leading role in the formation of the Iron and Steel Trades Confederation (ISTC) and the British Iron, Steel and Kindred Trades Association, becoming the first General Secretary of the ISTC. He served as President of the Trades Union Congress in 1926, during the UK General Strike, was on the economic consultative committee of the League of Nations, and was active in running the Daily Herald newspaper. He retired from his union posts in 1935, and wrote Men of Steel, a history of the metal-workers trade unions.

Pugh was appointed Commander of the Order of the British Empire (CBE) in the 1930 New Year Honours for public services, and knighted in the 1935 Birthday and Silver Jubilee Honours.

He was featured in Jack Thorne's 2023 play When Winston Went to War with the Wireless, played by Elliott Rennie.

Trade union offices
Preceded by J. T. Macpherson	Assistant General Secretary of the British Steel Smelters' Association; 1906 – 1917	Succeeded by Position abolished
Preceded by New position	General Secretary of the Iron and Steel Trades Confederation; 1917–1935	Succeeded by John Brown
Preceded by Alonzo Swales	President of the Trades Union Congress; 1926	Succeeded by George Hicks
Preceded by New position	Iron, Steel and Minor Metal Trades representative on the General Council of the TUC; 1921 – 1935; With: William Kean	Succeeded by John Brown and William Kean
Preceded by John Bromley and George Hicks	Trades Union Congress representative to the American Federation of Labour; 1927; With: Will Sherwood	Succeeded by Ebby Edwards and John Marchbank
Academic offices
Preceded by Fred Bramley	President of the Workers' Educational Association; 1926 – 1928	Succeeded by R. H. Tawney
