= 1994 United States Senate election in West Virginia =

- November 7, 1994
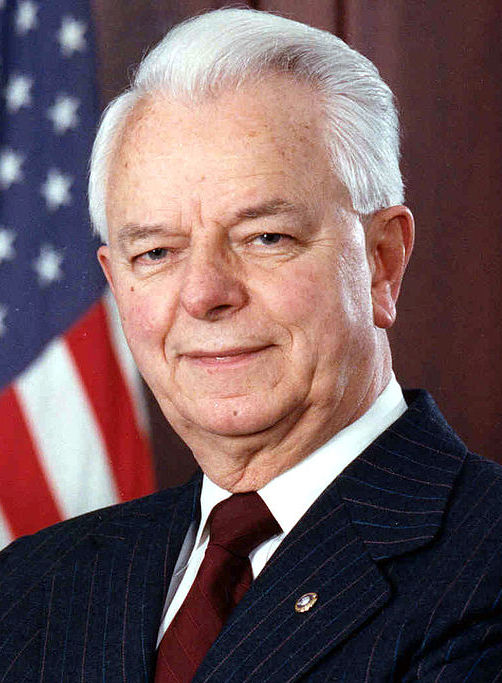

Nominee	Robert Byrd	Stanley Klos
Party	Democratic	Republican
Popular vote	290,495	130,441
Percentage	69.01%	30.99%
- County results Byrd: 50–60% 60–70% 70–80% 80–90%
U.S. senator before election
Robert Byrd
Democratic
Elected U.S. Senator
Robert Byrd
Democratic

The 1994 United States Senate election in West Virginia was held November 7, 1994. Incumbent Democratic U.S. Senator Robert Byrd won re-election to a seventh term. He won every county and congressional district in the state.

== Candidates ==
=== Democratic ===
- Robert Byrd, incumbent U.S. Senator

=== Republican ===
- Stanley L. Klos, author, historian, and businessman

== Campaign ==
Klos campaigned as a "sacrificial lamb" against Robert C. Byrd participating in the Republican U.S. Senatorial Committee’s strategy to re-capture a majority in the United States Senate in 1994. Byrd spent $1,550,354 to Klos' $267,165. Additionally the Democratic Party invested over $1 million in that State's U.S. Senatorial Campaign to the Republican Party's $15,000. The GOP captured a majority in the U.S. Senate. The highlights of the campaign included the hiring of an actor to play Robert C. Byrd who toured in staged Statewide Debates when the incumbent refused Klos's invitation for a series of formal Senatorial Debates. The campaign also organized successful demonstrations against the Bill and Hillary Clinton National Health Care Bus as it traveled through West Virginia in the summer of 1994. Byrd, while the bill was being debated on the Senate floor, rose suggesting the brakes be put on approving National Health Care measure while the bus was completing its tour in West Virginia. The campaign did not implement the "Death by a Thousand Cuts" plan proposed by strategists which was later acknowledged in speeches given and letters written by Byrd.

== Results ==
General election results
Party	Candidate	Votes	%
Democratic	Robert Byrd (incumbent)	290,495	69.01%
Republican	Stan Klos	130,441	30.99%
Democratic hold			

== See also ==
- 1994 United States Senate elections
