= Amalgamated Association of Tramway and Vehicle Workers =

- Merged into: United Vehicle Workers
- Founded: 1889
- Dissolved: 1919
- Headquarters: 5 Leaf Square, Pendleton
- Location: United Kingdom
- Members: 31,770 (1918)
- Key people: Stanley Hirst (Gen Sec); Robert Tootill (President)
- Affiliations: TUC, NTWF

The Amalgamated Association of Tramway and Vehicle Workers (T&VW) was a trade union representing workers on public transport in the United Kingdom.

In 1889, the Manchester and Salford Tramway Company began offering a reward to members of the public to inform on any acts of possible fraud committed by its staff. Workers on the tramways objected, fearing abuse of such a system, and founded a union to protect their interests, the Northern Counties Amalgamated Association of Tramway and Hackney Carriage Employees and Horsemen in General. While it initially had only 400 members, it immediately employed a full-time general secretary, George Jackson, at an initial salary of £1 4s a week.

Under Jackson's leadership, the union grew rapidly. By 1892, it had 2,723 members and had spread as far as Nottingham and Sheffield. That year, it was renamed as the Tramway, Hackney Carriage Employees and Horsemen's Association. Several small unions merged in: the Belfast Carters' Union, Bolton Tramway Union, Edinburgh and District Tramway and Carmen's Union, Huddersfield Carters' Union, and the Manchester, Salford and District Lurrymen and Carters' Union. Membership continued to grow, reaching 10,000 in 1901, when it became the "Amalgamated Association of Tramway and Vehicle Workers".

In 1903, the Edinburgh Tramway Company locked out workers in an effort to break the union's power, but the union proved successful. This inspired the London Tramway Employees' Union to amalgamate in 1904, and by 1910 membership had reached 17,076.

The union badge was blue in colour, and given both this and its reputation for being less militant than rival unions, it was nicknamed the "blue union".

The union was a founder constituent of the National Transport Workers' Federation in 1916. Three years later, it merged with the London and Provincial Union of Licensed Vehicle Workers, forming the United Vehicle Workers union.

== General Secretaries ==
1889: George Jackson
1917: Stanley Hirst
