= London and Provincial Union of Licensed Vehicle Workers =

- Predecessor: Metropolitan Cab Drivers' Trade Union
- Merged into: United Vehicle Workers
- Founded: 1894
- Dissolved: 1919
- Headquarters: 39 Gerrard Street, London
- Location: England
- Members: 20,000 (1913)
- Key people: Alfred Smith (Gen Sec)
- Affiliations: TUC, NTWF

The London and Provincial Union of Licensed Vehicle Workers (LPU) was a trade union representing taxi drivers in and around London. It was regarded as one of the most militant unions in the country.

== History ==
In 1890, the Metropolitan Cab Drivers' Trade Union was founded by John Burns and John Beasley. The following year, the London Cab Company raised the charges it made to cab drivers, but the union led a successful strike, and the company instead agreed to lower its charges. Membership peaked at 4,000, but had fallen to only 300 by the following year. By 1894, the union was moribund, and the cab company decided this provided an opportunity to raise its charges again. Workers decided against reviving the old union, and instead formed a new one, the London Cab Drivers' Trade Union, which by the end of the year already had 2,936 members. Ben Smith was appointed as its first organiser, and he proved successful, membership reaching 6,850 by 1896, although it then began falling. A combination of extensions to the London Underground and bus routes, and increased traffic congestion, was reducing demand for horse-drawn cabs. In response, the union undertook a strike in 1904 in order to get employers to agree to reduce hire charges, in the hope of increasing business. This succeed after only five days, and prompted many other cab drivers to join, membership rebounding to 6,121 by the end of the year.

The membership boom proved short-lived, and by 1908, it had fallen to a new low of only 1,632, as members began facing competition from the first motorised cabs. Unlike some unions elsewhere, the union decided to embrace the new technology, offering cheap driving lessons to members, in exchange for motor cab drivers receiving higher pay.

By 1913, most of the union's members drove motor cabs, and the union led a strike which succeeded in getting employers to pay for the petrol used. Again, this produced a boom in membership, which rose to 20,000, and the union began recruiting members from outside London, renaming itself as the "London and Provincial Union of Licensed Vehicle Workers".

The union badge was red in colour, and given this and its reputation for militancy, it was nicknamed the "red union".

In 1919, the union merged with the Amalgamated Association of Tramway and Vehicle Workers, forming the United Vehicle Workers.

== General Secretaries ==
1894: Fred Simmons
c.1900: Fred Hill
1913: H. A. Bywater
c.1915: Alfred Smith
