= United Vehicle Workers =

- Merged into: Transport and General Workers' Union
- Founded: 1919
- Dissolved: 1922
- Headquarters: Transport House, Emperor's Gate, South Kensington
- Location: United Kingdom
- Members: 115,897 (1921)
- Key people: Stanley Hirst, general secretary
- Affiliations: TUC

The United Vehicle Workers was a trade union representing drivers in the United Kingdom.

The union was founded in 1919 when the London and Provincial Union of Licensed Vehicle Workers merged with the Amalgamated Association of Tramway and Vehicle Workers. These were known as the "red" and "blue" unions, based on the colour of the unions' respective badges, and the supposed political inclinations of their members. It represented drivers of a wide range of vehicles, from buses and trams to cabs and horse-drawn carts. It also recruited related workers, such as conductors, cleaners and farriers. By 1921, the union had 115,897 members.

Within the union, members of its predecessors were reluctant to merge their branches, with the tram and bus drivers coming into particular conflict. Two branches of the union, dominated by bus drivers, broke away in 1921 to form the Trams, Omnibus, and Tube Workers union. Still, Ernest Bevin persuaded them to rejoin later in the year, shortly before the entire union became part of the new Transport and General Workers' Union.

== General Secretaries ==
1919: Stanley Hirst
