= Nottingham Central by-election =

Nottingham Central by-election may refer to one of two parliamentary by-elections held for the former British House of Commons constituency of Nottingham Central:

- 1930 Nottingham Central by-election
- 1940 Nottingham Central by-election

== See also ==
- Nottingham Central (UK Parliament constituency)
- List of United Kingdom by-elections
