= Henry Bendelack Hewetson =

English surgeon, naturalist and writer

Henry Bendelack Hewetson MRCS, FLS, FZS
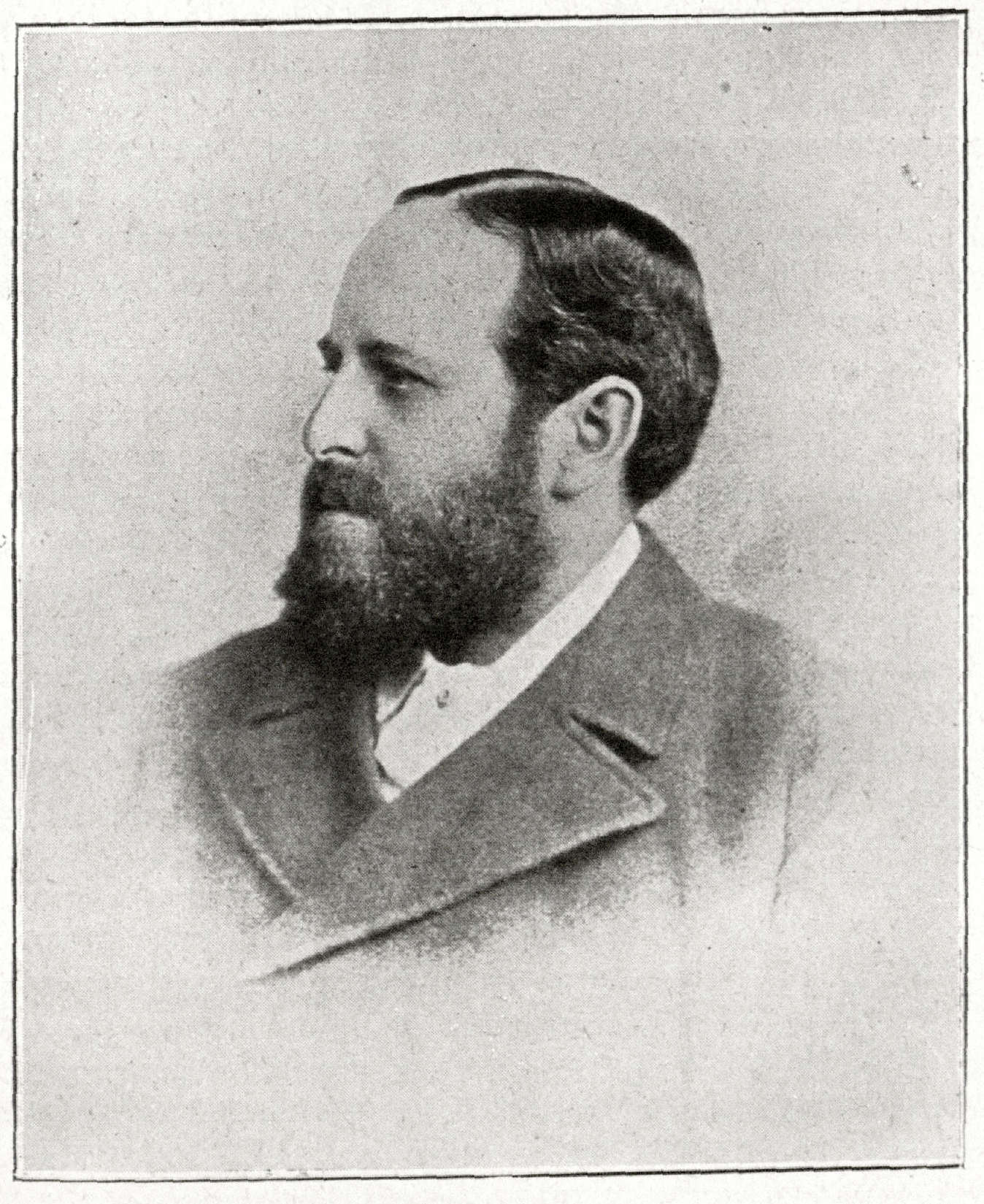
- Born: 3 April 1850; Beverley, East Riding of Yorkshire, England
- Died: 15 May 1899 (aged 49); Hull
- Occupations: surgeon; naturalist; writer

Signature
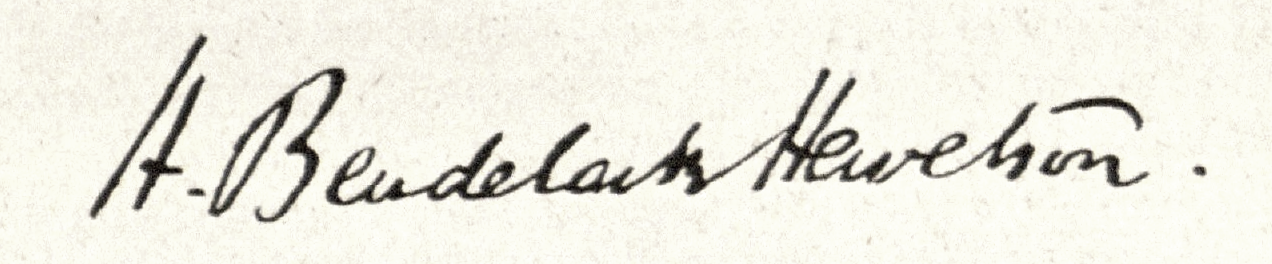

Henry Bendelack Hewetson (1850–1899) was an English surgeon, and also an active naturalist. He wrote books and articles on medical issues and about nature.

== Biography ==
Henry Bendelack Hewetson was born in Beverley in 1850, as the son of Clementina Juliet and Henry Hewetson (1826-1909). His family removed to Leeds a few years later, so that he was educated at Leeds Grammar School.

In 1868 he entered at the Leeds School of Medicine. He obtained his diploma in 1873, and became a member of the Royal College of Surgeons. He continued his study in London at Guy's Hospital and at Moorfields Ophthalmic Hospital. After returning to Leeds he became an assistant to Thomas Pridgin Teale.

In 1883 Hewetson was appointed Honorary Surgeon to the Leeds Public Dispensary; a few months later he resigned to become Honorary Ophthalmic and Aural surgeon to the Leeds Infirmary. He published in the fields of ophthalmology and otology.

Henry Bendelack Hewetson died on 15 May 1899 in Hull.

== Hewetson as a naturalist ==
Henry Bendelack Hewetson was a well known surgeon. But he became equally well known as a naturalist. When he died, Cordeaux wrote that his loss "will especially be felt by his scientific friends and naturalists, members of the Yorkshire Naturalists' Union and the Leeds Naturalists' Club, of which latter he was four times President". In 1885 he was elected President of the Leeds Naturalists' Club and Scientific Association for the first time. During that year he obtained from the Corporation the grant of a room in the Municipal Buildings for the housing of the collections and library and holding of meetings of that body. He was again elected President in 1886, 1896 and 1897. As President he constantly advocated the foundation of a Scientific Institute by the joint action of the several scientific societies of Leeds.

Hewetson was a keen ornithologist. He recorded several new visitors to the surroundings of Leeds, and, in conjunction with other observers, was active in the field of the study of migration.

Hewetson made two visits to Egypt, two to Morocco, also to Algiers and the Sahara. He also visited the south of France and Italy, the Canary Islands and Cape Verde Islands, and he made short visits to Norway, Sweden and the Netherlands. His last holiday he made to South America. On his visits to the North Coast of Africa he made valuable collections of the birds and insects of that region. His artistic abilities were of great service, for he could depict natural history objects in colours with "wonderful fidelity". His incursions into the realm of photography were limited to the use of a hand camera, with which he was fairly successful.

Some of his lectures on ornithology were published in print.

He presented a valuable collection of Egyptian antiquities to the Museum of the Philosophical Society of Leeds.

Hewetson was a Fellow of the Royal Geographical Society, of the Linnean Society and of the Zoological Society. In 1897 he was elected a member of the British Ornithologist Union.

== Bibliography ==
Among the published works of Henry Bendelack Hewetson are:

- Hewetson, Henry Bendelack (1879). Nature cared for and nature uncared for: the result upon the hearts of men. A lecture on ornithology delivered at the Walton Mission Room, on Friday, February 21st, 1879. London: West, Newman & Co. OCLC 560165531.
- —— (1879). Thoughts on ornithology, suggested by the exhibition of the Yorkshire Naturalists' Union, held at Leeds, January, 1879. Leeds: Charles Goodall, printer. OCLC 931212712.
- —— (1880). The influence of joy upon the workman and his work; a paper read before the Beverley church institute, on Tuesday, the 21st of October, 1879. London: W. Swan Sonnenschein & Allen. OCLC 8829165.
- —— (1881). The Life and works of Robert Hewetson, boy painter and poet: Containing phototype illustrations of drawings and paintings together with original essay, poems, and fairy tales. Leeds: printed by McCorquodale & Co. OCLC 253417966.
- —— (1885). The relation between sick headaches and defective sight: chiefly resulting from astigmatism: their pathology and treatment by glasses: illustrated by cases. Leeds: Goodall and Suddick. OCLC 42632231. (A paper read before the Leeds and West-Riding Medico-Chirurgical Society, 5 December 1884.)
- —— (1885). "The Treatment of Acute Earache by the Injection of Glycerinum Acidi Carbolici". The Lancet. 125 (3216 (18 April)): 703. doi:10.1016/S0140-6736(02)22331-4.
- —— (1886). "General Neuroses Having an Ophtalmic Origin". The Lancet. 128 (3300 (27 November)): 1017–1018. doi:10.1016/S0140-6736(00)49621-2.
- —— (1888). "A New Antiseptic Surgical Dressing". The Lancet. 131 (3382 (23 June)): 1246. doi:10.1016/S0140-6736(02)16895-4.
- —— (1888). "General Neuroses Having an Ophtalmic Origin". British Medical Journal. 2 (1454 (November)): 1037–1038. doi:10.1136/bmj.2.1454.1037. PMC 2198617. PMID 20752490.
- —— (1897). Localization of headache and sick headache: indicating their origin, pathology, & treatment. London: Simpkin, Marshall & Co. OCLC 753168150. (see also: this copy in archive.org).

== Sources ==
- "Henry Bendelack Hewetson". Obituary. The Ibis. Series 7. V (XIX): 470–4711. July 1899.
- "Editorial Gleanings" . The Zoologist. Series 4. 3 (696): 280–281. June 1899 – via Wikisource. [scan ]
- "Henry Bendelack Hewetson (1850–1899)". Natural History Biographies. 2018. (mind the links to the family tree and transcription of biographical notes)
- "Henry Bendelack Hewetson, M.R.C.S., F.L.S., F.Z.S., Ophthalmic And Aural Surgeon To The Leeds General Infirmary". The British Medical Journal. 1 (2003): 1251. May 1899. JSTOR 20260674.
- Cordeaux, John (August 1899). "In Memoriam. Henry Bendelack Hewetson". The Naturalist. 24 (511): 237–240 – via Biodiversity Heritage Library.
