= John Alexander Harvie-Brown =

Scottish ornithologist and naturalist (1844–1916)

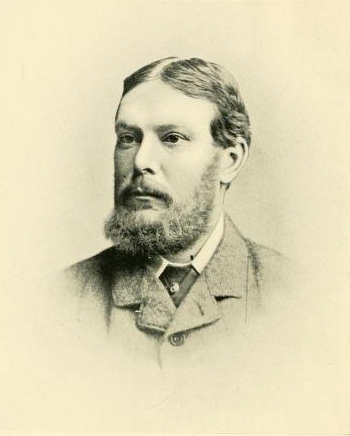
John Alexander Harvie-Brown, from the 1905 book Travels of a naturalist in Northern Europe

John Alexander Harvie-Brown FRSE, FZS (27 August 1844 – 26 July 1916) was a Scottish ornithologist and naturalist.

== Biography ==
Harvie-Brown was born near Larbert in central Scotland, the only son of John Harvie-Brown and his wife, Elizabeth Spottiswoode, who was the daughter of Thomas Spottiswoode of Dunipace (entitled "Thomas Spottiswoode, 6th of Dunipace"). He inherited approximately 2100 acres near Dunipace.

Harvie-Brown was educated at Merchiston Castle School, and then attended both the University of Edinburgh and Cambridge University.

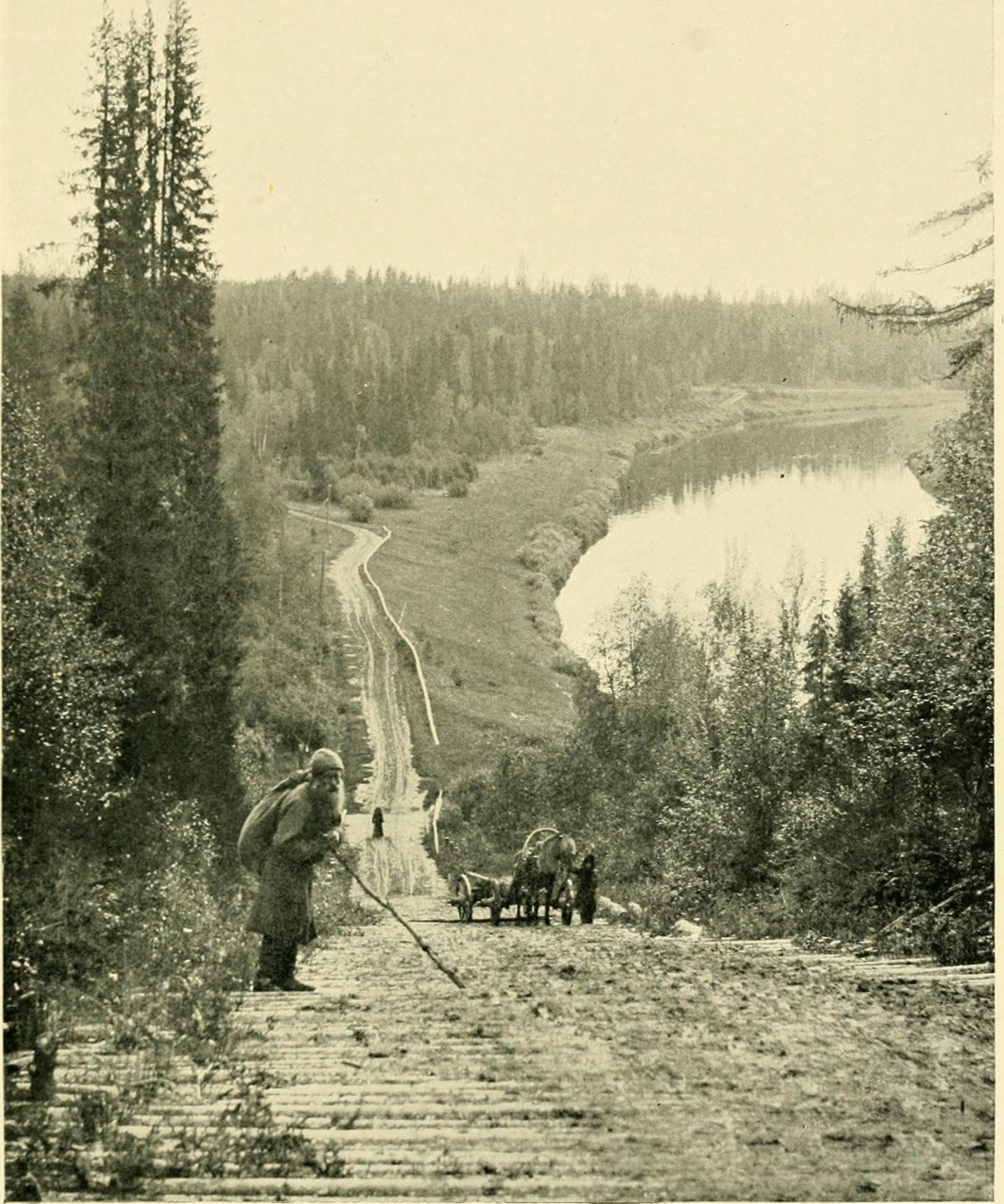
Travels of a Naturalist in Northern Europe (1905)

As a wealthy landowner, he could dedicate himself to ornithology and other naturalistic studies without pursuing a profession. He made ornithological visits to Norway, Russia, Finland and Transylvania. Perhaps his most famous expedition was with Henry Seebohm to the lower reaches of the Pechora River in 1875, when the eggs of the grey plover and the little stint were discovered. For many years Harvie-Brown cruised each summer among the islands of the Scottish coast in his yacht the "Shiantelle" (built in 1887 in Fraserburgh). He, with H. W. Feilden, collected many eggs and birds' skins from the Hebrides, Orkney, the Faroes and even the island of Rockall (no eggs but birds' skins in the case of Rockall). However, in January 1897 a fire almost totally destroyed the collection.

Harvie-Brown died in 1916, after a number of years of ill health. His burial was at Dunipace Old Cemetery. His publications in the scientific literature number close to 250 items. He was elected an Honorary Life Member of the American Ornithologists' Union. In 1912 the University of Aberdeen conferred upon him the honorary degree of LL.D.

== Bird migration and the British Association ==
In 1880 Alfred Newton persuaded the British Association to sponsor a committee for the study of bird migration all over the world but especially along the coasts of England and Scotland. Harvie-Brown, John Cordeaux, and W. Eagle Clarke were among the most important contributors to the committee's effort to recruit the keepers of lighthouses and lightvessels to make and record observations of bird migration.

Between 1879 and 1887 the reports of the Committee on the Migration of Birds, worked out by Eagle Clarke, and presented in 1896, involved information from many lighthouses of Great Britain and Ireland, but none from the south coast of Great Britain, between Varne Lightvessel in the east and Start Point Lighthouse in the west. For this reason Harvie Brown wrote a paper, addressed to "the lighthouse keepers of the English Channel, and to the local ornithologists of the counties abutting thereone." He was especially keen on filling in the blank, that could support conclusions concerning the so-called east-to-west migration line.

== Selected works ==
- Report on the migration of birds (1879–1887) (9 vols.)
  - Harvie-Brown, John A.; Cordeaux, John (1880). "Report on the Migration of Birds in the Autumn of 1879". The Zoologist. 3rd series. 4 (41): 161–204.
  - ——; Cordeaux, John; Kermode, Philip Moore Callow (1881). Report on the Migration of Birds in the Spring and Autumn of 1880. London: Sonnenschein & Allen. OCLC 756171980. (120 pgs.)
  - ——; Cordeaux, John; Kermode, Philip Moore Callow; Barrington, Richard Manliffe; More, A.G. (1882). Report on the Migration of Birds in the Spring and Autumn of 1881. London: West, Newman & Co. OCLC 315336609. (99 pgs.)
  - ——; Cordeaux, John; Barrington, Richard Manliffe; More, A.G. (1883). Report on the Migration of Birds in the Spring and Autumn. Fourth Report, 1882. London: West, Newman & Co. (106 pgs.)
  - ——; Cordeaux, John; Barrington, Richard Manliffe; More, A.G. (1884). Report on the Migration of Birds in the Spring and Autumn of 1883. Fifth Report. London: West, Newman & Co. (129 pgs.)
  - ——; Cordeaux, John; Barrington, Richard Manliffe; More, A.G.; Clarke, W. Eagle (1885). Report on the Migration of Birds in the Spring and Autumn of 1884. Sixth Report. London: West, Newman & Co. (186 pgs.)
  - ——; Cordeaux, John; Barrington, Richard Manliffe; More, A.G.; Clarke, W. Eagle (1886). Report on the Migration of Birds in the Spring and Autumn of 1885. Seventh Report. Edinburgh: Printed by McFarlane & Erskine. (173 pgs.)
  - ——; Cordeaux, John; Barrington, Richard Manliffe; More, A.G.; Clarke, W. Eagle (1887). Report on the Migration of Birds in the Spring and Autumn of 1886. Eighth Report. Edinburgh: Printed by McFarlane & Erskine. (174 pgs.)
  - ——; Cordeaux, John; Barrington, Richard Manliffe; More, A.G.; Clarke, W. Eagle (1888). Report on the Migration of Birds in the Spring and Autumn of 1887. Ninth Report. Edinburgh: Printed by McFarlane & Erskine. (175 pgs.)

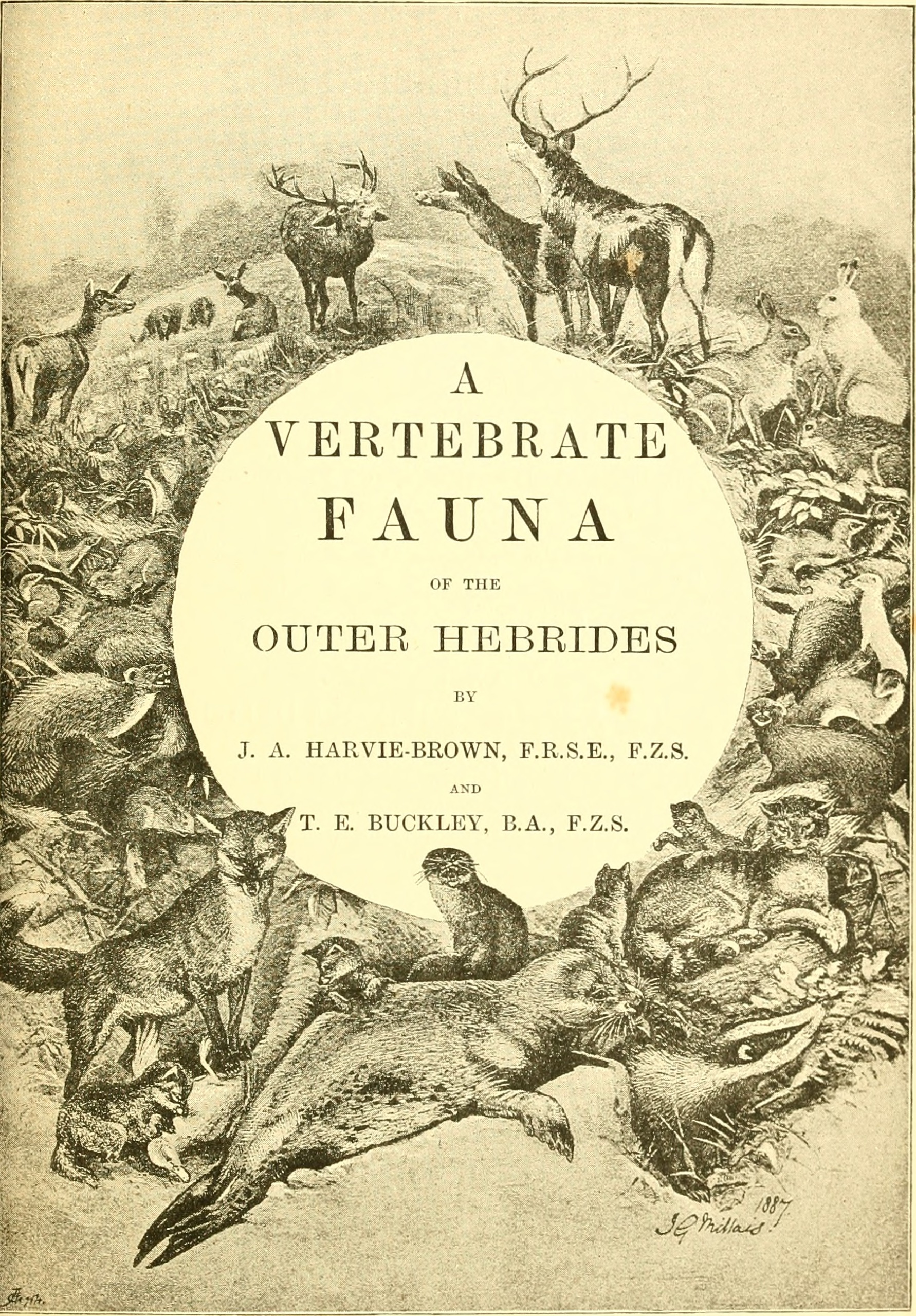
Image from A vertebrate fauna of the outer Hebrides

- —— (1879). The capercaillie in Scotland. Edinburgh: David Douglas.
- —— (1881). The history of the squirrel in Great Britain. Edinburgh: M'Farlane & Erskine.
- A vertebrate fauna of the outer Hebrides (1888) (with M. Forster Heddle, William Anderson Smith, & Thomas Edward Buckley)
- A vertebrate fauna of Argyll and the inner Hebrides (1892) (with Thomas E. Buckley)
- A fauna of the Moray basin (1895) (with Thomas E. Buckley)
- —— (1897). "The Migration of Birds: a paper addressed to the lighthouse keepers of the English Channel, and to the local ornithologists of the counties abutting thereon". The Zoologist. 4. 1 (677, November): 505–506. (He is wrongly named "J.A. Harvie Brown" here)
- The wonderful trout (1898)
- On the avifauna of the outer Hebrides, 1888-1902 (1902), in the Annals of Scottish Natural History: A Quarterly Magazine ...
- The red-necked phalarope in Ireland, the Outer Hebrides, and Shetland as a nesting species (1903), in the Irish Naturalist
- Travels of a naturalist in northern Europe, Norway, 1871, Archangel, 1872, Petchora, 1875 (1905)
