= Carolina (1934 film) =

1934 film

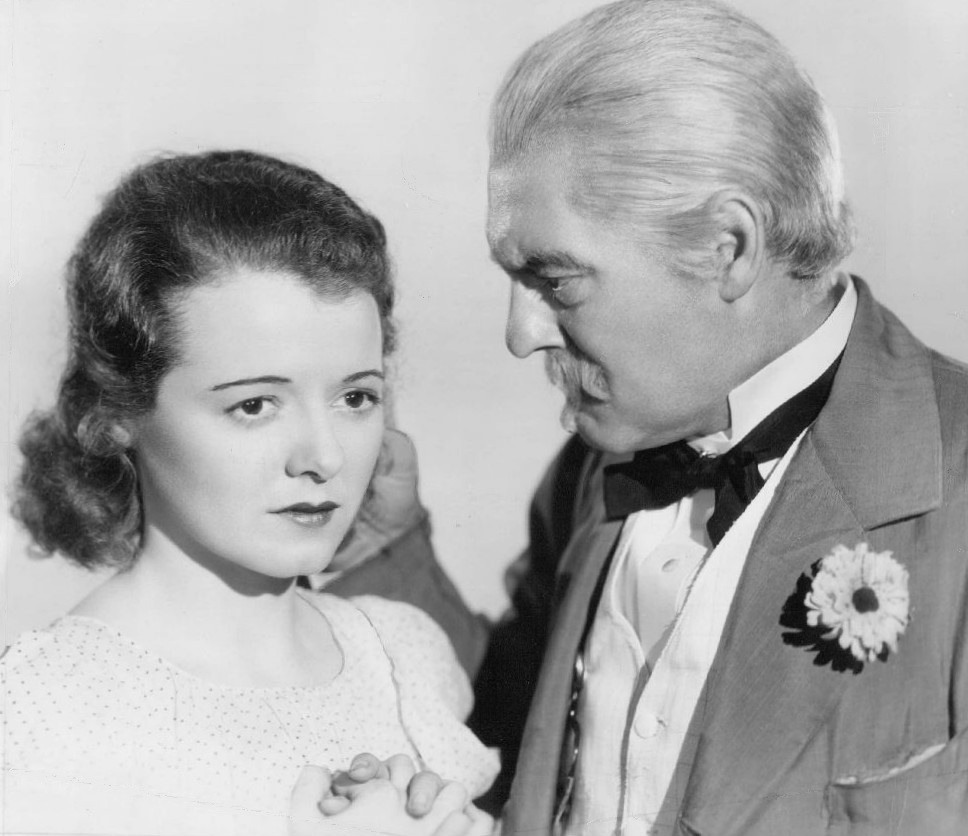
- Still with Janet Gaynor and Lionel Barrymore
- Directed by: Henry King
- Written by: Screenplay: Reginald Berkeley; Play: Paul Green
- Starring: Janet Gaynor; Lionel Barrymore; Robert Young; Stepin Fetchit; Shirley Temple
- Cinematography: Hal Mohr
- Edited by: Robert Bassler
- Music by: Louis De Francesco
- Distributed by: Fox Film Corporation
- Release date: February 2, 1934
- Running time: 85 minutes
- Country: United States
- Language: English

Carolina is a 1934 American pre-Code romantic comedy film directed by Henry King, with a screenplay by Reginald Berkley based on the 1931 play The House of Connelly by Paul Green, and starring Janet Gaynor, Lionel Barrymore, and Robert Young. The supporting cast features Stepin Fetchit and Shirley Temple in a romanticized story about a post-Civil War family in the fading Southern United States, that regaining its former prestige.

== Plot ==
Forty years after the Civil War, the Connelly family is romantically restored to their former glory when Will Connelly (Robert Young) marries a Yankee farm girl, Joanna Tate (Janet Gaynor), despite the objections of his temperamental mother. Lionel Barrymore plays Will's Uncle Bob Connelly.

== Cast ==
- Janet Gaynor as Joanna Tate
- Lionel Barrymore as Bob Connelly
- Robert Young as Will Connelly
- Henrietta Crosman as Mrs. Ellen Connelly
- Richard Cromwell as Alan
- Mona Barrie as Virginia Buchanan
- Stepin Fetchit as Scipio
- Ronnie Cosby as Harry Tate
- Jackie Cosbey as Jackie Tate
- Almeda Fowler as Geraldine Connelly
- Alden "Stephen" Chase as Jack Hampton
- Shirley Temple as Joan Connelly (uncredited)
