= Alfred Waterson =

British politician (1880–1964)

Alfred Edward Waterson (5 August 1880, Derby – 25 November 1964) was a Labour and Co-operative Member of Parliament in the United Kingdom. He was the first Co-operative Party MP.

Born in Derby, Waterson was a railwayman and activist in his trade union. He was the leader of the Labour group on Derby City Council.

Although the Co-operative Party put up ten candidates for the first time at the 1918 general election, only one met with success. Waterson was elected as MP for Kettering. He took the Labour whip in Parliament, ahead of any decision of Co-operative Congress to progress a formal alliance with the Labour Party.

Waterson was defeated at the 1922 general election. He became a national organiser of the Co-operative Party, serving until 1945. He contested the Nottingham Central by-election in 1930, and stood in Nottingham Central at the 1931 general election, coming a distant second in each case. He died in Wood Green, London aged 84.

Parliament of the United Kingdom
New constituency	Member of Parliament for Kettering; 1918 – 1922	Succeeded by Owen Parker
