= Terence O'Connor =

British politician

Solicitor General for England and Wales
- In office 1936–1940

Member of Parliament
- In office 1930-1940
- Constituency: Nottingham Central
- In office 1924-1929
- Constituency: Luton

Personal details
- Born: 13 September 1891 Bridgnorth, Shropshire, England
- Died: 7 May 1940 (aged 48)
- Party: Conservative
- Military career
- Units: Highland Light Infantry; West African Frontier Force
- Wars: World War I

Sir Terence James O'Connor, KC (13 September 1891 – 7 May 1940) was a Conservative Party politician in the United Kingdom

== Biography ==
Born in Bridgnorth, Shropshire, O'Connor served with the Highland Light Infantry and the West African Frontier Force during World War I. He was called to the bar in 1919, and became a bencher of the Inner Temple in 1936.

He was elected to the House of Commons at the 1924 general election, as Member of Parliament (MP) for Luton, but lost his seat at the October 1929 general election to the Liberal candidate, Leslie Burgin. He was appointed a King's Counsel that year.

O'Connor returned to Parliament seven months later in a by-election in the Nottingham Central constituency, and held the seat until his death in 1940, aged 48.

At the time of his death, was serving as Solicitor General, a position he had held since 1936 .

== In popular culture ==
O'Connor was portrayed by George Baker in the Granada Television series Lady Killers, in an episode depicting the trial of Charlotte Bryant.

Parliament of the United Kingdom
| Preceded by Geoffrey Howard | Member of Parliament for Luton; 1924 – 1929 | Succeeded by Leslie Burgin |
| Preceded by Sir Albert Bennett | Member of Parliament for Nottingham Central; 1930 – 1940 | Succeeded by Frederick Sykes |
Legal offices
| Preceded by Sir Donald Somervell | Solicitor General for England and Wales; 1936–1940 | Succeeded by Sir William Jowitt |
