= Reginald Berkeley =

British politician and screenwriter (1890–1935)

Reginald Cheyne Berkeley
- Born: 18 August 1890; London, England
- Died: 30 March 1935 (aged 44); Los Angeles, United States
- Education: Bedford Modern School

Reginald Cheyne Berkeley MC (18 August 1890 – 30 March 1935) was a Liberal Party politician in the United Kingdom, and later a writer of stage and radio plays, then a screenwriter in Hollywood. He had trained as a lawyer. He died in Los Angeles from pneumonia after an operation.

His son Humphry Berkeley was a Conservative MP in the United Kingdom.

== Early life ==
Berkeley was born in London to Humphry George Berkeley and Agnes Mary née Cheyne. He was educated privately and at Bedford Modern School. He later went to Fiji where his father was a prominent lawyer in Suva; then to Auckland, New Zealand, where he studied at Auckland University College and passed the Barristers Examination of the University of New Zealand. He was admitted to the Bar of Fiji and New Zealand in 1912, and to the Middle Temple (London) on 2 July 1919. He was a lieutenant in the 3rd (Auckland) Regiment of the territorials in New Zealand from 1911 to 1913.

Berkeley served in World War I as a captain in the Rifle Brigade. He was awarded the Military Cross in 1916. His citation reads:

For conspicuous gallantry in action. When his company commander was wounded, he led the company with great dash to its final objective, and later displayed great determination in consolidating the captured line.

Postwar he joined the staff of the League of Nations Union in 1919 as Editor of Pamphlets then Director of Propaganda, and the League Secretariat in 1921, resigning when he entered Parliament.

== Politician ==
He was elected as Member of Parliament (MP) for Nottingham Central at the 1922 general election, winning the seat with a majority of only 22 votes over the sitting Conservative MP Albert Atkey. He was re-elected in another two-way contest in 1923, but did not contest the 1924 general election. Labour fielded a candidate for the first time in Nottingham Central, and the Conservatives retook the seat.

He unsuccessfully contested the 1929 general election in Aberdeen North, and stood again in Nottingham Central at the by-election in 1930, where he won only 16.9% of the votes. He was defeated again in Aberdeen and Kincardine Central at the 1931 election. These defeats reflected the national decline in the fortunes of the Liberal Party and the rise of the Labour Party.

== Writer ==
His stage plays include The Lady with the Lamp (1929), based on the life of Florence Nightingale and starring Edith Evans in the title role, and The Man I Killed (1931), which was adapted for the screen as Broken Lullaby the following year. His play French Leave (1920) was filmed twice, once in 1930, and again in 1937. His screenwriting credits include Dreyfus (1931), Cavalcade (1933), The World Moves On (1934), Carolina (1934) and Nurse Edith Cavell (1939).

He wrote a number of radio plays for the British Broadcasting Company, (from 1927 the British Broadcasting Corporation). The Dweller in the Darkness, broadcast on 14 April 1925, was "written for the BBC for radio transmission", and The White Chateau was later described by the BBC as "one of the first plays specially written for broadcasting".

In February 1926 he withdrew permission for a radio broadcast of his play Mr. Abdulla, as he objected to cuts that the BBC intended to make to it, and those they had made to an earlier production, of The Quest of Elizabeth, a radio playlet about the death of a child which he wrote and which was broadcast in October 1925.

Berkeley also wrote at least one novel.

== Personal life ==
He had married Gwendoline Cock in 1914 and Clara Hildegarde Digby in 1926.

He died in 1935 in the Good Samaritan Hospital, Los Angeles aged 44 from pneumonia following a major operation. He was residing at 606 North Crescent Drive, Beverly Hills.

Parliament of the United Kingdom
Preceded by Albert Atkey	Member of Parliament for Nottingham Central; 1922–1924	Succeeded by Albert Bennet
