= Frederick Sykes =

British military officer and politician (1877–1954)

Air Vice-Marshal Sir Frederick Sykes GCSI GCIE GBE KCB CMG
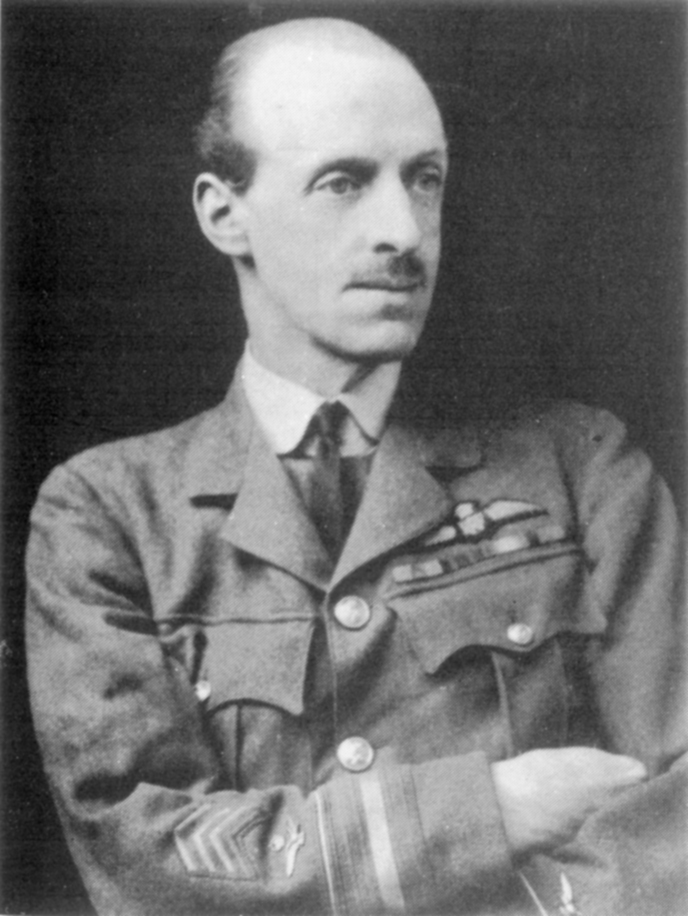
- Sykes in c. 1918
- Born: 23 July 1877; Addiscombe, Surrey, England
- Died: 30 September 1954 (aged 77); London, England
- Military career
- Allegiance: United Kingdom
- Branch: British Army (1899–1918); Royal Air Force (1918–1919)
- Service years: 1899–1919
- Rank: Air Vice-Marshal
- Commands: Chief of the Air Staff (1918–1919); RNAS Eastern Mediterranean (1915–1916); Military Wing of the Royal Flying Corps (1912–1914)
- Conflicts: Second Boer War; First World War
- Awards: Knight Grand Commander of the Order of the Star of India; Knight Grand Commander of the Order of the Indian Empire; Knight Grand Cross of the Order of the British Empire; Knight Commander of the Order of the Bath; Companion of the Order of St Michael and St George; Mentioned in Despatches (2); Order of Saint Vladimir, 4th Class (Russia); Commander of the Order of Leopold (Belgium); Distinguished Service Medal (United States); Commander of the Legion of Honour (France); Order of the Rising Sun, 2nd Class (Japan)
- Other work: Statesman, politician

Sir Frederick Hugh Sykes (23 July 1877 – 30 September 1954) was a British military officer and politician.

Sykes was a junior officer in the 15th Hussars before becoming interested in military aviation. He was the first Officer Commanding the Military Wing of the Royal Flying Corps before the First World War, and later served as the Flying Corps' Chief of Staff in France in 1914 and 1915. Later in the war, he served in the Royal Naval Air Service in the Eastern Mediterranean before returning to Great Britain where he worked to organise the Machine Gun Corps and manpower planning. In late 1917 and early 1918, Sykes was the deputy to General Wilson on the Supreme War Council and from April 1918 to early 1919 he served as the second Chief of the Air Staff.

After the war, Sykes was appointed the Controller of Civil Aviation and he continued in this role until 1922 when he entered politics, becoming the Conservative MP for Sheffield Hallam, which he held until 1928 when he resigned. From 1928 to 1931 he was Governor of Bombay, after which time he returned to Great Britain where he involved himself in business and public life. During the Second World War, Sykes was an MP once more, this time for Central Nottingham. He lost his seat in 1945 and he died nine years later.

== Military career ==
Sykes was the son of Henry Sykes and Margaret Sykes (née Sykes), and nephew of the artist Godfrey Sykes. Following civilian employment as a clerk and after working on a tea plantation in Ceylon, Sykes enlisted as a trooper in the Imperial Yeomanry Scouts regiment of the British Army at the start of the Second Boer War. Following capture, Sykes was forcibly marched across South Africa but was later abandoned and returned to the British forces. In 1900 he was commissioned into Lord Roberts' Bodyguard but suffered a serious wound to the chest which resulted in his being invalided back to Great Britain. On 2 October 1901 he was granted a regular commission as a second lieutenant in the 15th Hussars. He was posted to the West African Regiment and granted the local rank of lieutenant on 7 March 1903. He was promoted to the substantive rank of lieutenant on 29 July 1903.

In 1904, Sykes's interest in aviation was first demonstrated when he obtained a ballooning certificate whilst being attached to the Balloon Section of the Royal Engineers. He was restored to the establishment of the 15th Hussars on 22 September 1904. He joined the Intelligence Staff at Simla in India in 1905 before attending Staff College, Quetta in autumn 1908. He was promoted to captain on 1 October 1908. In 1910 Sykes commenced flying lessons at Brooklands which led to him being awarded Royal Aero Club certificate No. 96 in June 1911. On 25 February 1911 Sykes was posted as a staff officer to the Directorate of Military Operations at the War Office. As a firm believer in the importance of wartime aerial reconnaissance, he was chosen to join the sub-committee of the Committee of Imperial Defence which was given the task of investigating the use of aircraft.

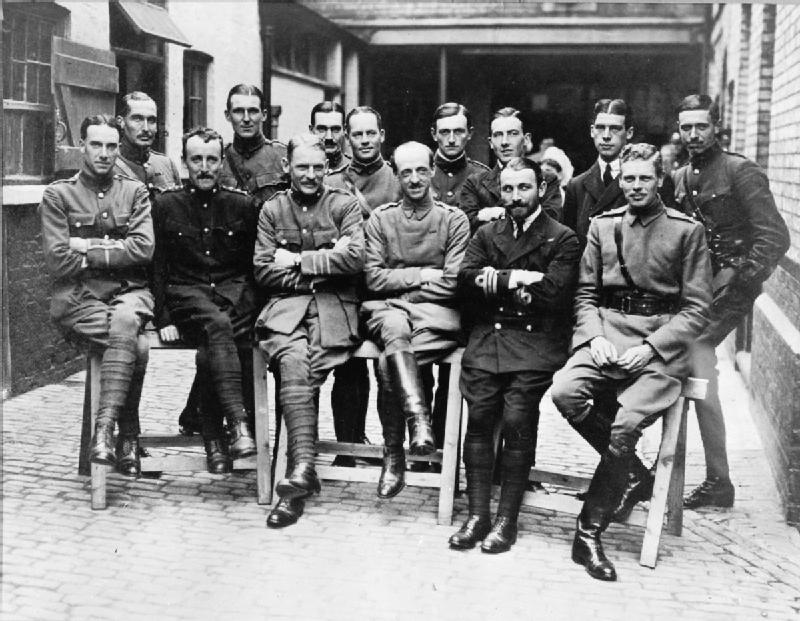
Sykes in 1913 with fellow officers

On 13 May 1912 Sykes was appointed Officer Commanding the Military Wing of the Royal Flying Corps with the temporary rank of major. His duties included the recruitment and training of pilots. While in command, Sykes solicited suggestions for a new motto for the Corps: Sykes approved J. S. Yule's suggestion, Per Ardua ad Astra, and it was this phrase which was subsequently adopted by the Royal Air Force as its motto. On 9 July 1913 his role was restyled as Commandant of the Military Wing of the Royal Flying Corps and he was granted the temporary rank of lieutenant-colonel.

With the outbreak of the First World War, Royal Flying Corps squadrons were deployed to France in August 1914. Although the configuration and effectiveness of the deployed forces owed much to Sykes, as a middle-ranking officer he lacked the seniority thought necessary for command in the field. General Henderson became the general officer commanding the Royal Flying Corps in the Field and Sykes acted as his chief of staff from 5 August 1914. On 22 November 1914, Henderson was appointed General Officer Commanding the 1st Division and Sykes took up command of the Royal Flying Corps in the Field. However, Sykes did not spend long in command. The decision to post Henderson and replace him with Sykes was not to Lord Kitchener's liking and he ordered a reversal of the posting. On 21 December 1914, Henderson resumed command of the Royal Flying Corps in the Field and Sykes was granted the temporary rank of colonel and once again made his chief of staff. He was promoted to the brevet rank of lieutenant colonel on 18 February 1915. With the rapid expansion of the corps, there was a growing debate between those who believed that the corps should remain under central control and those who hoped that its units could be placed under the control of the corps or divisional commanders. Unsurprisingly as chief of staff, Sykes took the former view and following increasing arguments, Sykes was posted on 26 May 1915 being placed at the disposal of the Admiralty.

Sykes visited the Dardanelles to investigate the confused air situation and after writing a report he was appointed as the Officer Commanding the Royal Naval Air Service Eastern Mediterranean Station on 24 July 1915 with the rank of colonel second commandant in the Royal Marines as well as the rank of Wing Captain in the Royal Naval Air Service. This made Sykes the air commander for the Gallipoli campaign. During this time he acted on the recommendations of his report, building up air forces that sunk several Turkish ships. He was honoured as Companion of the Order of St Michael and St George on 14 March 1916 and mentioned in despatches on 16 March 1916.

Sykes was made assistant adjutant and quartermaster-general of the 4th Mounted Division in March 1916 and, having been awarded the Russian Order of St Vladimir, 4th Class on 12 April 1916, he was appointed assistant adjutant-general at the War Office with responsibility for organising the Machine Gun Corps and manpower planning on 9 June 1916. He was made Deputy Director of Organisation at the War Office and granted the temporary rank of brigadier general on 8 February 1917. On 27 November 1917 he became Deputy Adjutant and Quartermaster-General at the War Office in which role he served on the British section of the Allied War Council in the Palace of Versailles under General Sir Henry Wilson.

Sykes's military career culminated in his appointment as Chief of the Air Staff on 13 April 1918 and, in that role, he did much to establish the new service. He was promoted to brevet colonel in June 1918. However, in January 1919, two months after the war ended, Winston Churchill was appointed Secretary of State for War and Secretary of State for Air. While Churchill was preoccupied with implementing post-War defence cuts and the demobilization of the Army, Sykes submitted a paper with what were at the time unrealistic proposals for a large air force of the future. Being dissatisfied with Sykes's performance, Churchill decided to reinstate Sir Hugh Trenchard, the previous Chief of the Air Staff. Accordingly, on 1 January 1919 Sykes was appointed a Knight Commander of the Order of the Bath and allowed to take early retirement with the rank of major general with effect from 31 March 1919.

Sykes was appointed a Commander of the Belgian Order of Leopold on 15 July 1919 and awarded the American Distinguished Service Medal on the same date. He was also granted the rank of air vice marshal when the RAF introduced its own rank structure on 1 August 1919, appointed a Knight Grand Cross of the Order of the British Empire on 26 August 1919 and appointed an officer of the French Legion of Honour on 18 November 1919.

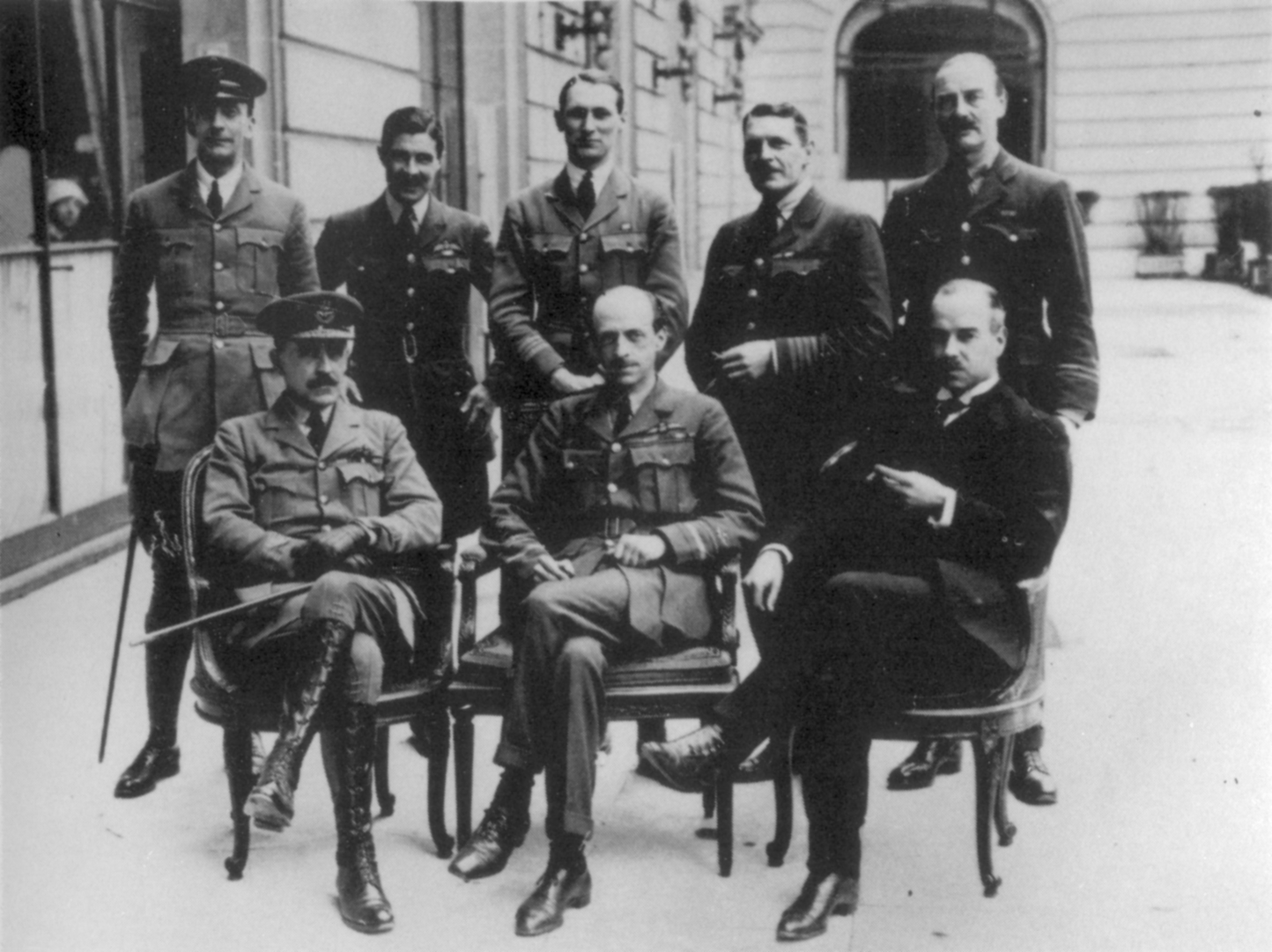
The British Air Section at the Paris Peace Conference in 1919

From 1919 to 1922, Sykes was the Controller of Civil Aviation. He was awarded the Japanese Order of the Rising Sun, 2nd Class on 4 January 1921 and in 1922 he published Aviation in War and Peace, a history of aviation in three chapters which covered pre-War flight, aviation during World War I and both military and civil aviation in peace time.

== Political career ==
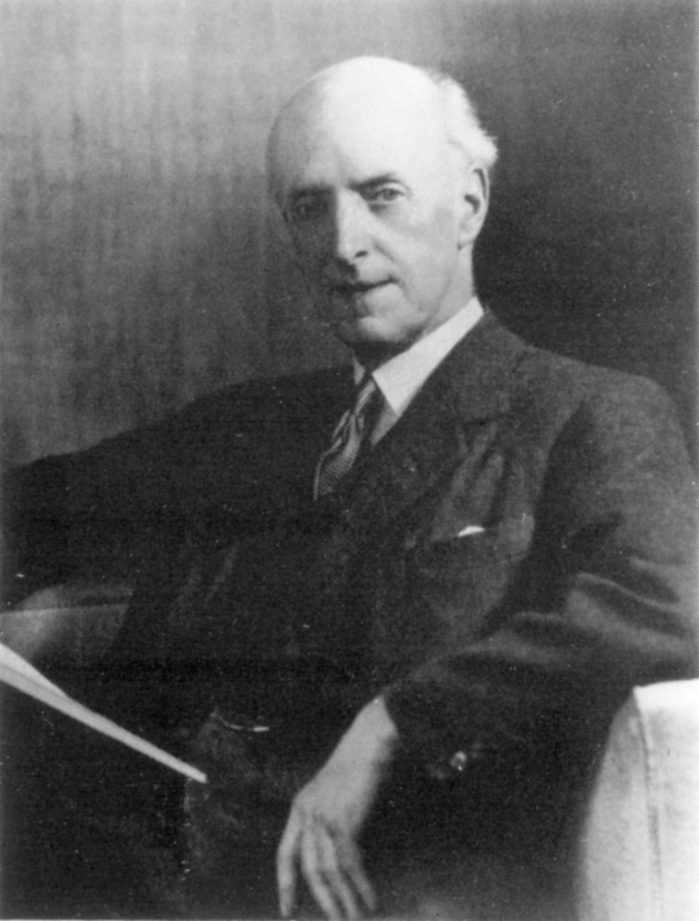
Sir Frederick Sykes circa 1940

Sykes entered political life at the general election in November 1922 when he was elected the Conservative Member of Parliament for Sheffield Hallam. Sykes retained the seat at the 1923 election and the 1924 election. He resigned the seat on 26 June 1928 to become Governor of Bombay on 17 October 1928. He was appointed a Knight Grand Commander of the Order of the Indian Empire on 3 November 1928 and a member of the Privy Council on 20 November 1928 and served in Bombay until 8 November 1933.

Sykes returned to Great Britain in 1933 and for the next six years he held various directorships and official committee posts including with the Miners' Welfare Commission and the British Sailors' Society. He was appointed a Knight Grand Commander of the Order of the Star of India on 2 February 1934 and a Knight of Justice of the Order of St John on 19 June 1936.

With the outbreak of war in 1939 Sykes offered his services to the British Government but he was not required, and so he stood for Parliament once more. After the death in May 1940 of Terence O'Connor, the Solicitor General and MP for Nottingham Central, Sykes was returned unopposed in the resulting by-election. He sat as Nottingham Central MP until defeated at the 1945 general election.

== Personal life ==
In 1920 Sykes married Isabel Harrington Law, the elder daughter of Bonar Law, the Conservative Party leader who two years later became prime minister. Frederick and Isabel Sykes had one son, Bonar Sykes.

Sykes bought the 18th-century Conock Manor, near Devizes in Wiltshire, in 1945 and the associated Manor Farm in 1948. Lord Blake, who knew Sykes personally, stayed at Conock while writing his biography of Bonar Law.

Frederick Sykes died at Beaumont Street, London on 30 September 1954, and was cremated at Golders Green Crematorium. Geoffrey de Havilland wrote to Isabel after the cremation: "I was deeply touched by your husband's wish that I should scatter the ashes over Salisbury Plain. I will, of course, do so... I always had admiration and affection for your husband and will always remember his kindness and help in the early days at Farnborough." Isabel died in 1969.

== Sources ==
- Ash, Eric (1999). Sir Frederick Sykes and the air revolution, 1912–1918. Frank Cass. ISBN 0-7146-4828-0.
- Boyle, Andrew (1962). Trenchard Man of Vision. St James's Place, London: Collins. ASIN B0000CLC2N.
- Probert, Henry (1991). High Commanders of the Royal Air Force. HMSO. ISBN 0-11-772635-4.
- Sykes, Frederick (1942). Many Angles: an autobiography. Harrap, London. ASIN B000ZFPGE0.

Military offices
Preceded by Sir Alexander Bannerman; As Commandant of the Air Battalion	Officer Commanding the Military Wing of the Royal Flying Corps; 13 May 1912 – 5 August 1914	Succeeded by Hugh Trenchard
New title Outbreak of war	Chief of Staff, Royal Flying Corps in the Field; 5 August – 22 November 1914	Vacant Title next held by Himself
Preceded by Sir David Henderson	Officer Commanding the Royal Flying Corps in the Field; 22 November 1914 – 20 December 1914	Succeeded by Sir David Henderson
Vacant Title last held by Himself	Chief of Staff, Royal Flying Corps in the Field; 20 December 1914 – 26 May 1915	Succeeded by Robert Brooke-Popham
Preceded by Charles Samson; As Officer Commanding No. 3 Wing RNAS	Officer Commanding RNAS Eastern Mediterranean; July 1915 – February 1916	Succeeded by Francis Scarlett
Preceded by Sir Hugh Trenchard	Chief of the Air Staff; 1918–1919	Succeeded by Sir Hugh Trenchard
Government offices
New title	Controller of Civil Aviation; 1919–1922	Succeeded by Sir Sefton Brancker; As Director
Parliament of the United Kingdom
Preceded by Douglas Vickers	Member of Parliament for Sheffield Hallam; 1922–1928	Succeeded by Sir Louis Smith
Preceded by Terence O'Connor	Member of Parliament for Nottingham Central; 1940–1945	Succeeded by Geoffrey de Freitas
Political offices
Preceded by Sir Leslie Orme Wilson	Governor of Bombay; 1928–1931	Succeeded by The Lord Brabourne
