= Jack Dunnett =

British politician (1922–2019)

John Jacob Dunnett (24 June 1922 – 26 October 2019) was a British Labour Party politician, solicitor, and football club chairman. He died in London in October 2019 at the age of 97.

== Early life ==
Dunnett was born in Maryhill, Glasgow, to Jewish parents who moved the family south to Croydon when he was a boy. He was educated at Whitgift Middle School, Croydon, and Downing College, Cambridge, where he studied law. He served in the forces during World War II, first in the Royal Fusiliers and then in the Cheshire Regiment from June 1941 to December 1946, reaching the rank of Captain. He took part in the invasion of Italy in September 1943 at Salerno, and was wounded in action near Cassino. After the war Dunnett returned to Cambridge, took his BA and LLB degrees, and qualified as a solicitor.

== Politics ==
Dunnett joined the Labour Party in 1949. He served as a councillor on Middlesex County Council (1958–61) and on Enfield Borough Council (1958–61), serving as an alderman until 1963. He was elected to the Greater London Council in 1964, representing Hounslow until his retirement at the next election in 1967.

Dunnett was elected at the 1964 general election as Member of Parliament for Nottingham Central and held the seat until it was abolished in boundary changes for the 1974 election. He was then returned for the new Nottingham East constituency until the 1983 general election in which he did not stand; the seat then fell to the Conservatives. During the 1964–70 Labour Government, he was parliamentary private secretary (PPS) to Fred Mulley during the latter's time as Minister for Aviation (1965–67), Disarmament (1967–69), and Transport (1969–70).

Known within the Parliamentary Labour Party as a loyalist with a firm commitment to voting discipline, Dunnett was on the traditionally-minded, conservative right wing of the party: he was one of just three Labour MPs (the others being Arthur Lewis and Leslie Spriggs) to vote in favour of the reintroduction of capital punishment in 1979, and the only time he broke the whip was to vote against the Labour government's refusal to give council housing tenants the right to buy their properties.

== Football ==
Dunnett was Chairman of Brentford Football Club. In January 1967, following poor gates, he discussed a merger with Jim Gregory of Queens Park Rangers of the two clubs. This move threatened Brentford's independence and a consortium of businessmen and supporters of Brentford bought out Dunnett's shares to stave off proposed merger. Subsequently, Queens Park Rangers won promotion to the First Division and then to the Premier League.

Dunnett was Chairman of Notts County from 1967, financing the club's regular annual losses by making interest free loans from his company, Park Street Securities. The Club paid a low rent to their landlords who were Nottingham Council. Dunnett inaugurated a fundraising scheme "life line" in 1986. Then in 1987, he stood down as Director and sold all his shares to Derek Pavis, completely severing his connection with the club. Under Dunnett's chairmanship, the club reached the then First Division, surviving for three years albeit with poor gates.

Dunnett was elected President of the Football League (1981–86 and 1988–89), and was vice-president of the Football Association for the same period. He was a member of the Football Association's executive committee at the time of the Hillsborough disaster.

== Bibliography ==
- Times Guide to the House of Commons, 1966, 1979 and 1983 editions
- Leigh Rayment's Historical List of MPs

Parliament of the United Kingdom
Preceded by John Cordeaux	Member of Parliament for Nottingham Central; 1964 – Feb. 1974	Constituency abolished
New constituency	Member of Parliament for Nottingham East; Feb. 1974 – 1983	Succeeded by Michael Knowles
