= Ian Winterbottom, Baron Winterbottom =

The Right Honourable The Lord Winterbottom
- Lord Winterbottom in 1969, taken by Godfrey Argent

Member of Parliament for Nottingham Central
- In office 23 February 1950 – 6 May 1955
- Preceded by: Geoffrey de Freitas
- Succeeded by: John Cordeaux

Personal details
- Born: Ian Winterbottom; 6 April 1913 Horton House, Northamptonshire, England
- Died: 4 July 1992 (aged 79) London, England
- Party: Labour (until 1981); SDP (1981–88) 'Continuing' SDP (1988–90); Crossbench (1990–91); Conservative (since 1991)
- Spouse(s): Rosemary Mills (m. 1939; div. 1944) Ira Munk (m. 1944)
- Children: 4
- Parent(s): G. H. Winterbottom; Georgina MacLeod
- Education: Clare College, Cambridge

Ian Winterbottom, Baron Winterbottom (6 April 1913 – 4 July 1992) was a Labour Party politician in the United Kingdom. He was a junior minister in the Labour Governments of the 1960s and 1970s who later defected to the Social Democratic Party.

== Life ==
Winterbottom was born in Horton House, Northamptonshire, the fifth child of the wealthy industrialist G. H. Winterbottom. He was educated at Charterhouse School and Clare College, Cambridge, where he studied natural sciences. Upon coming down from university he was employed in his father's bookcloth firm until the advent of the Second World War, when he established a machine tools factory in Derby and then volunteered for the army. He served in the Royal Horse Guards for four years, reaching the rank of captain and taking part in fighting across much of north-western Europe. In 1946, he was demobilised and shortly afterwards became the aide-de-camp and personal assistant to Vaughan Berry, the regional commissioner of Hamburg in the British occupation zone.

Winterbottom had been drawn to socialism while working in one of his father's textile mills in Manchester, and became a member of the Independent Labour Party (ILP) in Miles Platting towards the end of the 1930s. He was elected at the 1950 general election as the Labour Member of Parliament (MP) for Nottingham Central, a marginal constituency which the sitting Labour MP Geoffrey de Freitas had abandoned for the more promising Lincoln seat. Winterbottom was re-elected at the 1951 general election with a majority of only 139 votes, but was defeated at the 1955 election by the Conservative candidate John Cordeaux. He contested Nottingham Central again at the 1959 general election, but Cordeaux held it with an increased majority.

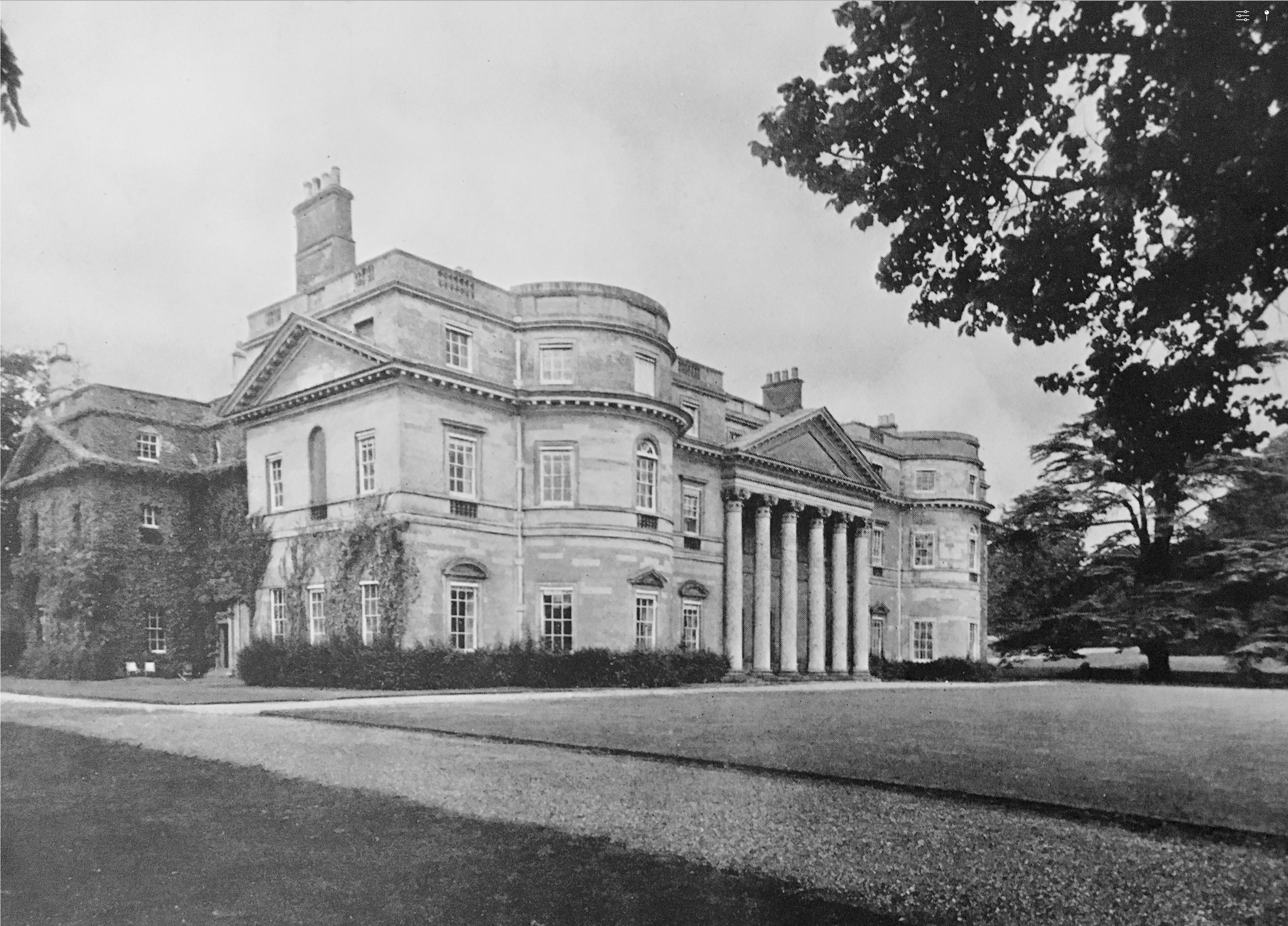
Horton House, Winterbottom's birthplace

Upon losing his seat Winterbottom focused on his business interests and developing his farm in Northamptonshire. He did not contest the 1964 general election, when Labour returned to government under Harold Wilson, but was created a life peer on 14 May 1965, as Baron Winterbottom, of Clopton in the County of Northampton. After Labour's victory at the 1966 general election, he joined the Labour Government, serving as Under-Secretary of State for the Navy until 1967, as Parliamentary Secretary to the Ministry of Public Building and Works from 1967 to 1968 and finally as Under-Secretary of State for the Air Force from 1968 until the government's defeat at the 1970 general election.

After Labour was returned to office in 1974 Winterbottom became a Lord-in-Waiting (whip) and spokesman on defence and trade in the House of Lords, but as a moderate in the party he was disappointed by the Government's record and resigned from it in 1978. In 1981, he joined the Social Democratic Party (SDP) as a founder member, but after opposing that party's merger with the Liberals in 1988 he chose to align with David Owen's 'continuing' SDP, serving as its defence spokesman until it was dissolved in 1990. In his Who's Who entry he described himself as "latterly a Conservative", and after a brief period on the crossbenches he took the Conservative whip in the Lords shortly before his death in 1992 at the age of 79.

== Resources ==
- Richard Kimber's Political Science Resources: UK General Elections since 1832
- Leigh Rayment's Peerage Pages
- Leigh Rayment's Historical List of MPs

Parliament of the United Kingdom
Preceded by Geoffrey de Freitas	Member of Parliament for Nottingham Central; 1950 – 1955	Succeeded by John Cordeaux
Political offices
Preceded by Joseph Mallalieu	Under-Secretary of State for the Navy; 1966–1967	Succeeded by Maurice Foley
Preceded by James Boyden	Parliamentary Secretary to the Ministry of Public Building and Works; 1967–1968	Succeeded by Charles Loughlin
Preceded by Merlyn Rees	Under-Secretary of State for the Air Force; 1968–1970	Succeeded by Antony Lambton
