= Lincolnshire Naturalists' Union =

Natural history club in Lincolnshire

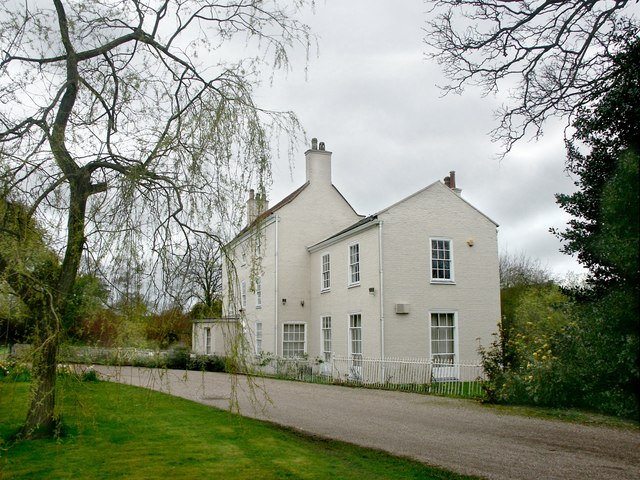
- Banovallum House
- Founded: 12 June 1893
- Type: Registered charity
- Purpose: To study, record, hold meetings, supply information, publish books, exhibit, discuss and learn about the wildlife of Lincolnshire.
- Location: Banovallum House, Manor House Street, Horncastle, Lincolnshire, England, LN9 5HF
- Region served: Lincolnshire
- Website: lnu.org

Lincolnshire Naturalist's Union (LNU) is an association of amateur naturalists covering a wide range of natural history subjects. It was founded in 1893 and aims to promote the investigation of the fauna, flora, and physical features of the county of Lincolnshire and to promote the study of natural history.

== History ==
The society was formed on 12 June 1893 during a meeting held in Mablethorpe. The meeting came about from conversations held by William F. Baker and Joseph Coe with "prominent naturalists connectected with Lincolnshire". About 30 naturalists met at Mablethrope, travelled to Theddlethorpe and then returned to the Book-in-Hand hotel at Mablethorpe to discuss the formation of a union. A subsequent meeting was held on 1 July 1893 at Lincoln to elect officers to organise the union. John Cordeaux was elected as the inaugural President of the LNU and William F. Baker as its Secretary. Officers were also elected to six divisional sections: Vertebrate Zoology, Conchology, Entomology, Botany, Geology, and Micro-Zoology & Botany.

== Activities ==
The LNU has hosted over 800 field meetings across the county of Lincolnshire. Historically, several members of the LNU have donated their collections to the county museum, The Collection, in Lincoln.

== See also ==
- Members of the Lincolnshire Naturalists' Union
