= Albert Atkey =

British politician

Atkey in 1940.

Sir Albert Reuben Atkey (1 July 1867 – 9 November 1947) was a Conservative Party politician in the United Kingdom.

At the 1918 general election, standing as a Coalition Conservative, he was elected as member of parliament (MP) for the new Nottingham Central constituency. At the 1922 election, he lost the seat by a majority of only 22 votes to the Liberal Party candidate, Reginald Berkeley. He stood again in 1923, but Berkeley was returned with a majority of 1,805, and Atkey did not stand for Parliament again.

Instead he concentrated on local politics and became Sheriff of Nottingham in 1910 and Lord Mayor of Nottingham in 1928. His term of office as Lord Mayor is best remembered for the opening of Nottingham Council House by the Prince of Wales (later Edward VIII) on 22 May 1929. Atkey was a prominent businessman and founded A.R. Atkey Ltd, the first motor traders in Nottingham. He was knighted in 1935.

Parliament of the United Kingdom
New constituency	Member of Parliament for Nottingham Central; 1918 – 1922	Succeeded by Reginald Berkeley
