= Nottingham Central =

Parliamentary constituency in the United Kingdom, 1918–1974

- Former borough constituency for the House of Commons

1918–February 1974
- Seats: one
- Created from: Nottingham East, Nottingham West and Nottingham South
- Replaced by: Nottingham East, Nottingham North

Nottingham Central was a borough constituency in the city of Nottingham. It returned one Member of Parliament to the House of Commons of the Parliament of the United Kingdom.

The constituency was created for the 1918 general election, and abolished for the February 1974 general election.

== Boundaries ==
1918–1950: The County Borough of Nottingham wards of Forest, Market, Robin Hood, St Ann's, and Sherwood.

1950–1955: The County Borough of Nottingham wards of Forest, Market, Robin Hood, St Mary's, and Sherwood, and the Rural District of Nottingham.

1955–1974: The County Borough of Nottingham wards of Forest, Manvers, Market, Radford, and St Ann's, and the Rural District of Nottingham.

== Members of Parliament ==
Year	Member	Party
1918	Albert Atkey	Unionist
1922	Reginald Berkeley	Liberal
1924	Albert Bennett	Unionist
1930	Sir Terence O'Connor	Conservative
1940	Sir Frederick Sykes	Conservative
1945	Geoffrey de Freitas	Labour
1950	Ian Winterbottom	Labour
1955	John Cordeaux	Conservative
1964	Jack Dunnett	Labour
Feb 1974	constituency abolished	

== Election results ==
=== Elections in the 1910s ===
General election 1918: Nottingham Central
Party		Candidate	Votes	%	±%
C	Unionist	Albert Atkey	10,552	63.8	
	Liberal	Edmund Huntsman	3,988	24.1	
	National	Arthur Kitson	1,999	12.1	
Majority			6,564	39.7	
Turnout			16,539	51.0	
	Unionist win (new seat)				
C indicates candidate endorsed by the coalition government.

=== Elections in the 1920s ===
General election 1922: Nottingham Central
Party	Candidate	Votes	%	±%
Liberal	Reginald Berkeley	11,481	50.0	+25.9
Unionist	Albert Atkey	11,459	50.0	−13.8
Majority		22	0.0	N/A
Turnout		22,940	68.9	+17.9
Liberal gain from Unionist		Swing	+19.9	

General election 1923: Nottingham Central
Party	Candidate	Votes	%	±%
Liberal	Reginald Berkeley	13,208	53.7	+3.7
Unionist	Albert Atkey	11,403	46.3	−3.7
Majority		1,805	7.4	+7.4
Turnout		24,611	72.8	+3.9
Liberal hold		Swing	+3.7	

General election 1924: Nottingham Central
Party	Candidate	Votes	%	±%
Unionist	Albert Bennett	15,107	57.3	+11.0
Labour	William Henderson Coultate	6,852	26.0	New
Liberal	Charles Roberts	4,409	16.7	−37.0
Majority		8,255	31.3	New
Turnout		26,368	76.6	+3.8
Unionist gain from Liberal		Swing		

General election 1929: Nottingham Central
Party	Candidate	Votes	%	±%
Unionist	Albert Bennett	14,571	41.7	−15.6
Labour Co-op	Eleanor Barton	11,573	33.2	+7.2
Liberal	Arthur Brampton	8,738	25.1	+8.4
Majority		2,998	8.5	−22.8
Turnout		34,882	77.4	+0.8
Unionist hold		Swing	−11.4	

=== Elections 1930–45 ===
1930 Nottingham Central by-election
Party	Candidate	Votes	%	±%
Conservative	Terence O'Connor	14,946	54.3	+12.6
Labour Co-op	Alfred Waterson	7,923	28.8	−4.4
Liberal	Reginald Berkeley	4,648	16.9	−8.2
Majority		7,023	25.5	+17.0
Turnout		27,517	61.1	−16.3
Conservative hold		Swing	+8.5	

General election 1931: Nottingham Central
Party	Candidate	Votes	%	±%
Conservative	Terence O'Connor	25,828	77.42	
Labour Co-op	Alfred Waterson	7,532	22.58	
Majority		18,296	54.84	
Turnout		33,360	75.50	
Conservative hold		Swing		

General election 1935: Nottingham Central
Party	Candidate	Votes	%	±%
Conservative	Terence O'Connor	18,706	64.73	
Labour Co-op	William Allitt	10,193	35.27	
Majority		8,513	29.46	
Turnout		28,899	68.89	
Conservative hold		Swing		

Another general election was required to take place before the end of 1940. The political parties had been making preparations for an election to take place from 1939 and by the end of that year, Terence O'Connor had been selected by the Conservatives and Geoffrey de Freitas by Labour.

After O'Connor's death in May 1940, a by-election was held in July, at which Frederick Sykes was returned unopposed for the Conservatives.

1940 Nottingham Central by-election
Party	Candidate	Votes	%	±%
Conservative	Frederick Sykes	Unopposed	N/A	N/A
Conservative hold				

General election 1945: Nottingham Central
Party	Candidate	Votes	%	±%
Labour	Geoffrey de Freitas	13,681	48.39	
Conservative	Frederick Sykes	10,947	38.72	
Liberal	D Craven Griffiths	3,644	12.89	New
Majority		2,734	9.67	N/A
Turnout		28,272	73.88	
Labour gain from Conservative		Swing		

=== Elections 1950–70 ===
General election 1950: Nottingham Central
Party	Candidate	Votes	%	±%
Labour	Ian Winterbottom	19,237	46.31	
Conservative	Robert Cary	17,487	42.10	
Liberal	John Michael Glyn-Barton	4,814	11.59	
Majority		1,750	4.21	
Turnout		41,538	82.86	
Labour hold		Swing		

General election 1951: Nottingham Central
Party	Candidate	Votes	%	±%
Labour	Ian Winterbottom	20,517	50.17	
Conservative	J Anthony H Crean	20,378	49.83	
Majority		139	0.34	
Turnout		40,895	81.37	
Labour hold		Swing		

General election 1955: Nottingham Central
Party	Candidate	Votes	%	±%
Conservative	John Cordeaux	20,903	50.92	
Labour	Ian Winterbottom	20,145	49.08	
Majority		758	1.84	N/A
Turnout		41,048	72.70	
Conservative gain from Labour		Swing		

General election 1959: Nottingham Central
Party	Candidate	Votes	%	±%
Conservative	John Cordeaux	24,004	52.33	
Labour	Ian Winterbottom	21,869	47.67	
Majority		2,135	4.66	
Turnout		45,873	87.39	
Conservative hold		Swing		

General election 1964: Nottingham Central
Party	Candidate	Votes	%	±%
Labour	Jack Dunnett	21,040	52.66	
Conservative	John Cordeaux	18,912	47.34	
Majority		2,128	5.32	N/A
Turnout		39,952	71.36	
Labour gain from Conservative		Swing		

General election 1966: Nottingham Central
Party	Candidate	Votes	%	±%
Labour	Jack Dunnett	21,348	58.86	
Conservative	Antony EJ Mitton	14,922	41.14	
Majority		6,426	17.72	
Turnout		36,270	67.74	
Labour hold		Swing		

General election 1970: Nottingham Central
Party	Candidate	Votes	%	±%
Labour	Jack Dunnett	17,638	55.61	
Conservative	Bernard Brook-Partridge	14,079	44.39	
Majority		3,559	11.22	
Turnout		31,717	60.15	
Labour hold		Swing		

== See also ==
- 1930 Nottingham Central by-election
- 1940 Nottingham Central by-election
