= 1940 Nottingham Central by-election =

UK by-election

The 1940 Nottingham Central by-election was a parliamentary by-election held for the British House of Commons constituency of Nottingham Central on 19 July 1940. The seat had become vacant when the Conservative Member of Parliament (MP) Sir Terence O'Connor had died on 7 May 1940. O'Connor had held the seat since a by-election in 1930.

The Conservative party selected as its candidate Sir Frederick Sykes, the former Governor of Bombay who had been MP for Sheffield Hallam from 1922 to 1928. The parties in the war-time Coalition Government had agreed not to contest vacancies in seats held by other coalition parties, so Sykes was returned unopposed. He was defeated at the 1945 general election.

== See also ==
- Nottingham Central (UK Parliament constituency)
- 1930 Nottingham Central by-election
- Nottingham
- List of United Kingdom by-elections
