= John Cordeaux (ornithologist) =

English ornithologist

John Cordeaux FRGS, MBOU
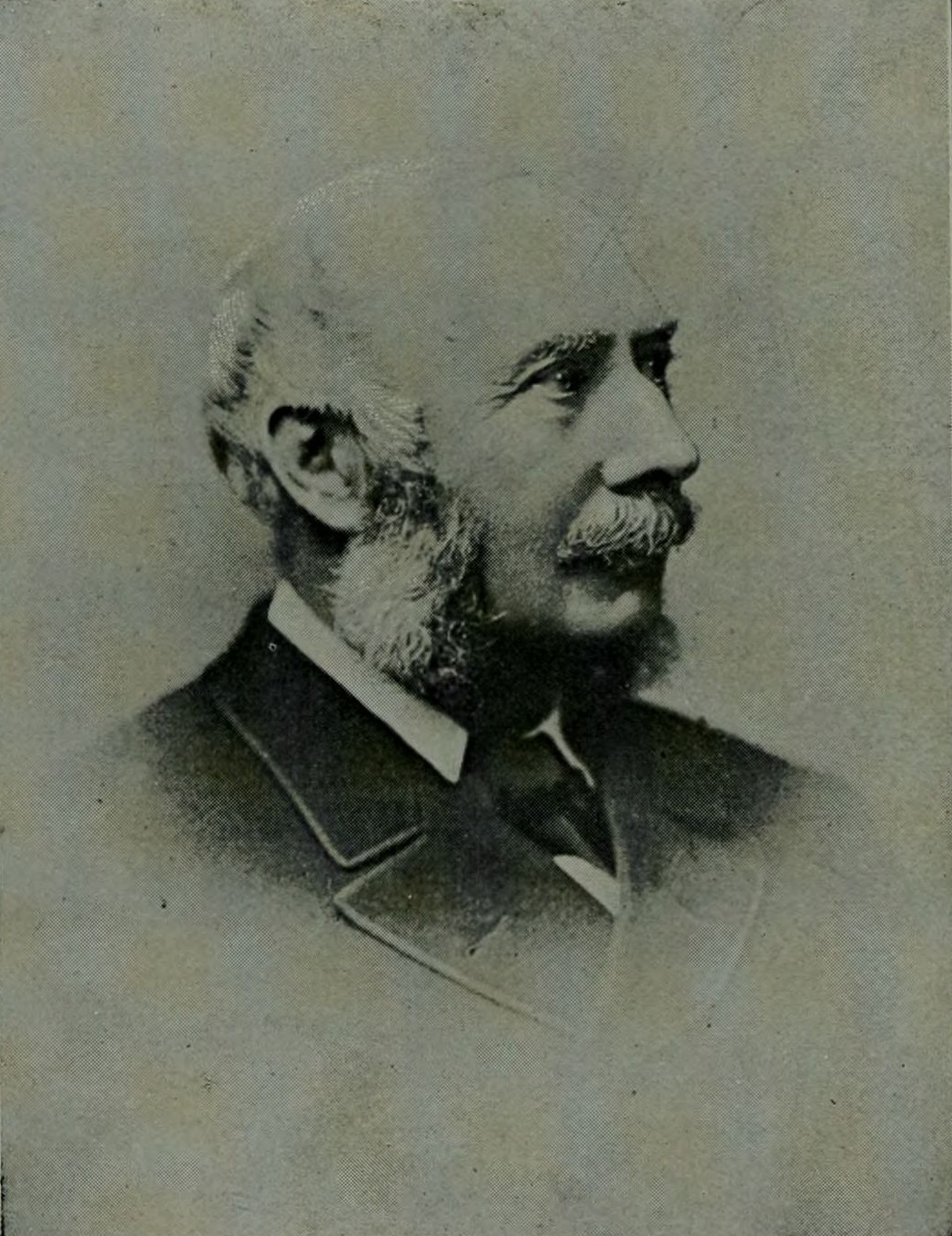
- Born: 27 February 1831; Foston, Leicestershire, England
- Died: 1 August 1899; Great Coates, England
- Occupation: ornithologist
- Known for: work on bird migration

John Cordeaux FRGS, MBOU (27 February 1831, Foston, Leicestershire – 1 August 1899, Great Coates House) was one of the foremost English amateur naturalists and ornithologists of his day, known for his work with the British Association on bird migration.

== Biography ==
Cordeaux was the son of Rev. John Cordeaux, rector of Hooton Roberts, Yorkshire, and Elizabeth, daughter of Christopher Taylor, of Tothill, Lincolnshire. On his mother's side he descended from Edward I.

Cordeaux lived at Great Coates House, near Grimsby, and was a justice of the peace. In 1860, he married Mary Ann (d. 1922), daughter of William Wilson, MD. They had two sons; the younger, Colonel Edward Kyme Cordeaux, was father of the Conservative politician John Cordeaux.

In 1893 Cordeaux became the first president of the Lincolnshire Naturalists' Union.

== Ornithology ==
Cordeaux began his study of bird migration on the coasts of the counties of Lincolnshire (where he lived) and Yorkshire. In 1872 he published a summary of the results of years of observations in his book Birds of the Humber District. In 1874 he was elected as a member of the British Ornithologists' Union. In the autumn of that same year he went to the island of Heligoland to learn about the ornithological knowledge accumulated by Heinrich Gätke; soon after the visit Cordeaux wrote a paper for The Ibis describing Gätke's collection. In 1879 Cordeaux collaborated with J. A. Harvie-Brown in persuading keepers of lighthouses and lightvessels on the coasts of England and Scotland to accumulate information on bird migration. At the summer 1880 meeting at Swansea, the British Association formed a committee headed by Alfred Newton with Cordeaux as secretary; the purpose of the committee was to systematically continue the work which Cordeaux and Harvie-Brown had shown to be practicable. At the summer 1896 meeting of the British Association at Liverpool, W. Eagle Clarke presented a Digest of the Observations for the committee's findings.

For thirty-five years, Cordeaux made ornithological contributions to The Ibis, The Zoologist and several other journals. In 1894 he was the president of the Lincolnshire Naturalists' Union.

== Bibliography ==
Among the published works of John Cordeaux are:

- Cordeaux, John (1872). Birds of the Humber District. London: van Voorst.
- —— (1875). "Notes on the Birds of Heligoland in Mr. Gätke's Collection". The Ibis. series 3. 5: 172–188.
- —— (1895). "Address to The Lincolnshire Naturalists' Union, Delivered at Lincoln, May 24th, 1894, by John Cordeaux, M.B.O.U., president (1893)". The Transactions of the Lincolnshire Naturalists' Union. 1895: 1–12.
- —— (1896). "Order Anseres". British Birds with their Nests and Eggs in six volumes. Vol. 4. Hull / London: Brumby & Clarke Ltd. pp. 52–203. OCLC 183027458 (all editions).
- —— (1899). A list of British birds belonging to the Humber districht : having a special reference to their migrations. Revised to April, 1899. London: R.H. Porter. OCLC 559414549 (all editions).

== Sources ==
- Newton, Alfred (24 August 1899). "Obituary: Mr. John Cordeaux" (PDF). Nature. 60 (1556): 398. doi:10.1038/060398a0. S2CID 43576461.
