= John Cordeaux =

Lieutenant-Colonel John Kyme Cordeaux CBE (23 July 1902 – 4 January 1982), was a Conservative Party politician in the United Kingdom. He was the Member of Parliament for Nottingham Central from 1955 to 1964.

== Background and military career ==
Cordeaux was born into a gentry family descended from Edward I, the second son of Colonel Edward Kyme Cordeaux (1866–1948), CBE, DL, JP, of Brackenborough Lawn, Louth, Lincolnshire, High Sheriff of Lincolnshire in 1925, late of the Lincolnshire Regiment, and Hilda Eliza Agar, MBE, daughter of Sir Henry Bennett, of Grimsby and of Thorpe Hall, Louth. His paternal grandfather was the ornithologist John Cordeaux.

Cordeaux served in World War II in the Royal Marines, reaching the rank of Lieutenant Colonel.

== Political career ==
Cordeaux was elected at the 1955 general election as the Member of Parliament (MP) for Nottingham Central, narrowly defeating the Labour MP Ian Winterbottom. He held the seat in 1959, but lost it at the 1964 election to the Labour candidate Jack Dunnett.

== Honours ==
Cordeaux was appointed CBE in 1946, and was a Commander of the Order of Orange-Nassau (with swords), Commander of the Order of the Dannebrog, and received the King Haakon VII Freedom Cross.

== Personal life ==
In 1923, Cordeaux married Norah, daughter of A. L. Hilyar Cleland; they divorced in 1953 having had three sons and a daughter.

Parliament of the United Kingdom
Preceded by Ian Winterbottom	Member of Parliament for Nottingham Central; 1955–1964	Succeeded by Jack Dunnett
