= 1930 Nottingham Central by-election =

UK parliamentary by-election

The 1930 Nottingham Central by-election was a parliamentary by-election held on 27 May 1930 for the British House of Commons constituency of Nottingham Central.

== Previous MP ==
The seat had become vacant on when the constituency's Conservative Member of Parliament (MP), Sir Albert Bennett, had resigned his seat on 7 May. He had been Nottingham Central's MP since the 1924 general election.

== Candidates ==
All three candidates were former MPs.

The Conservative candidate was Terence O'Connor, the former MP for Luton, who had lost his seat at the 1924 general election.

He faced a Labour Co-operative opponent Alfred Waterson, who had been Co-operative Party MP for Kettering from 1918 to 1922, but had not contested a parliamentary election since his defeat.

The Liberal Party candidate was Reginald Berkeley, who had been MP for Nottingham Central from 1922 until he stood down in 1924. He had unsuccessfully contested the 1929 general election in Aberdeen North.

== Result ==
O'Connor held the seat comfortably, with 54% of the votes, and held the seat until his death in May 1940, triggering another by-election.

Berkeley's 16.9% share was a long way below the 53.7% he had won when he last contested this seat, in 1923, reflecting the national decline in the fortunes of the Liberal Party.

Nottingham Central by-election, 27th May 1930
Party	Candidate	Votes	%	±%
Conservative	Terence O'Connor	14,946	54.3	+12.6
Labour Co-op	Alfred Waterson	7,923	28.8	−4.4
Liberal	Reginald Berkeley	4,648	16.9	−8.2
Majority		7,023	25.5	+17.0
Turnout		27,517	61.1	−16.3
Conservative hold		Swing	+8.5	

== See also ==
- Nottingham Central constituency
- 1940 Nottingham Central by-election
- Nottingham
- Lists of United Kingdom by-elections
- United Kingdom by-election records
