= Labour Party (UK) election results (1906–1922) =

This article lists the Labour Party's election results in elections from it adopting the "Labour Party" name in 1906 until the end of the 1918 to 1922 Parliament.

== Summary of general election performance ==
Year	Number of Candidates	Total votes	Average votes per candidate	% UK vote	Change (percentage points)	Saved deposits	Number of MPs
1910 Jan	78	505,657	6,483	7.0	+2.7	N/A	40
1910 Dec	56	371,802	6,639	6.4	-0.6	N/A	42
1918	361	2,245,777	6,221	20.8	+14.4	355	57

== Sponsorship of candidates ==
Sponsor	Candidates Jan 10	MPs Jan 10	Candidates Dec 10	MPs Dec 10	Candidates 18	MPs 18
BSP	N/A	N/A	N/A	N/A	4	0
CLP	0	0	0	0	144	5
Fabian	2	0	2	1	unknown	0
ILP	14	6	12	8	50	3
SDF	N/A	N/A	N/A	N/A	3	1
Trade union	62	34	42	33	163	49

== Election results ==
=== By-elections, 1906–1910 ===
Smillie, first candidate run under the "Labour Party" name

By-election	Candidate	Votes	%	Position	Sponsor
1906 Cockermouth by-election	Robert Smillie	1,436	14.5	3	Miners
1906 Huddersfield by-election	T. Russell Williams	5,422	33.8	2	ILP
1907 Belfast North by-election	William Walker	4,194	41.1	2	Carpenters & Joiners
1907 Jarrow by-election	Pete Curran	4,698	33.0	1	Gasworkers
1907 Liverpool Kirkdale by-election	John Hill	3,330	45.4	2	Boilermakers
1907 Kingston upon Hull West by-election	James Holmes	4,512	29.1	3	ASRS
1908 Leeds South by-election	Albert E. Fox	2,451	19.4	3	ASLEF
1908 Dewsbury by-election	Ben Turner	2,446	20.2	3	Textile Workers
1908 Dundee by-election	George Harold Stuart	4,014	24.9	3	Postmen
1908 Montrose Burghs by-election	Joseph Burgess	1,937	29.4	2	ILP
1909 Taunton by-election	Frank Smith	1,085	35.4	2	Fabian
1909 Croydon by-election	Frank Smith	886	4.2	3	ILP
1909 Sheffield Attercliffe by-election	Joseph Pointer	3,631	27.5	1	Patternmakers
1909 Mid Derbyshire by-election	John George Hancock	6,735	60.5	1	Miners

=== January 1910 general election ===
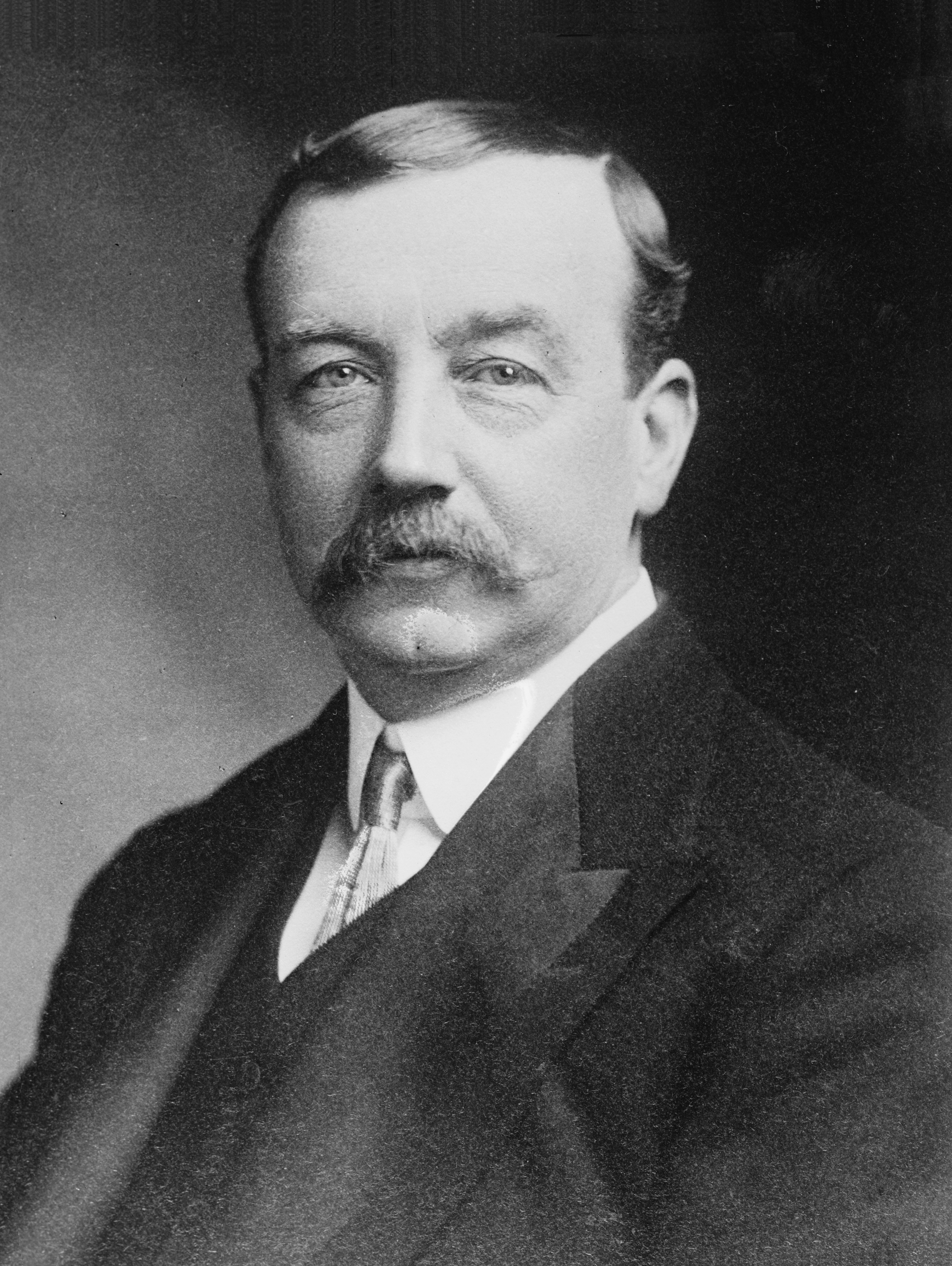
Henderson, leader of the party in January 1910, elected for Barnard Castle

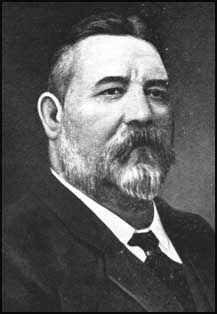
"Mabon", a miners' MP and former Liberal, re-elected for Rhondda

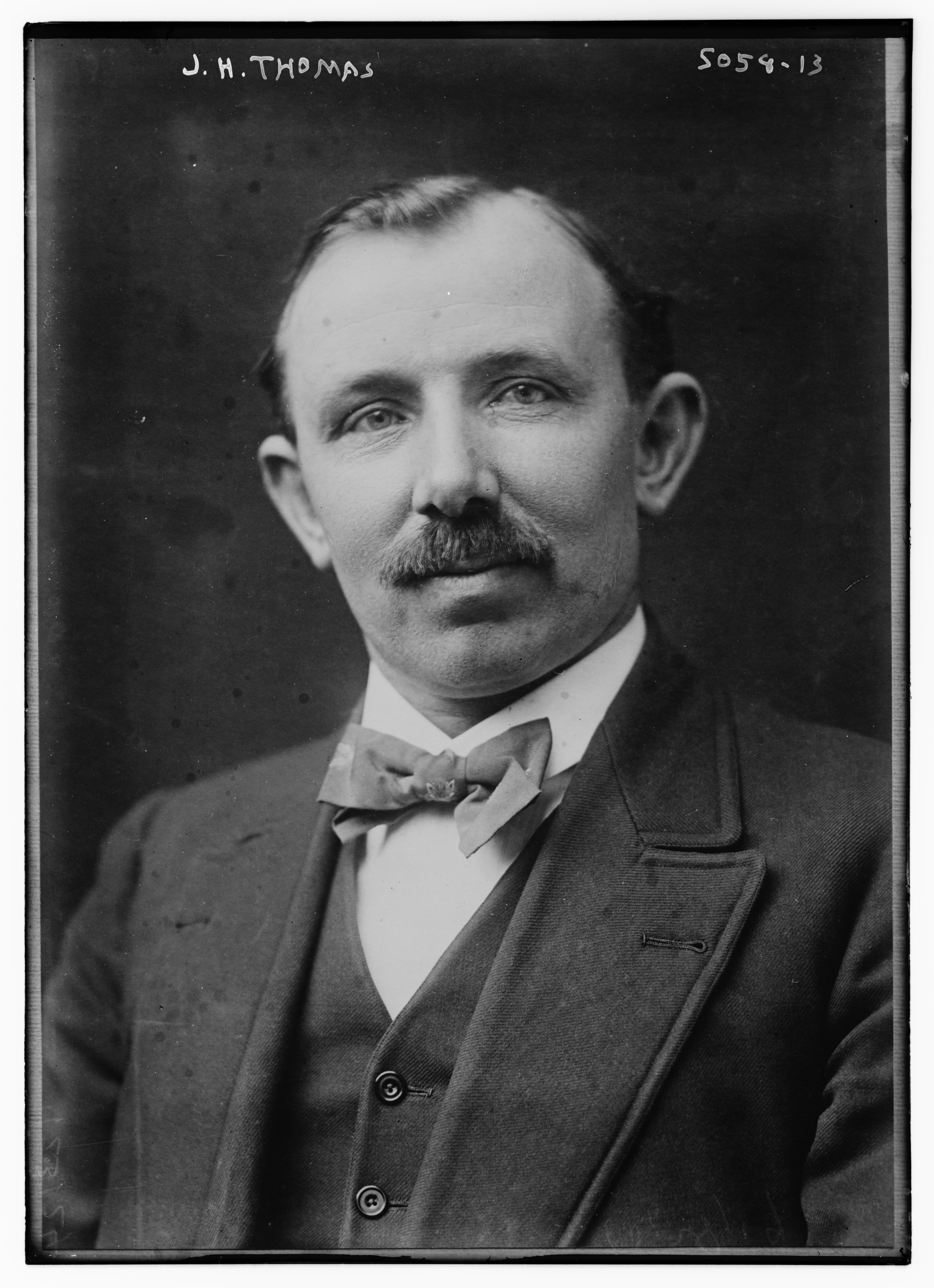
Thomas, newly elected for Derby

Constituency	Candidate	Votes	%	Position	Sponsor
Barnard Castle	Arthur Henderson	6,096	56.7	1	Iron Founders
Barrow-in-Furness	Charles Duncan	5,304	55.2	1	Engineers
Belfast North	Robert Gageby	3,951	38.7	2	Flaxdressers
Birmingham Bordesley	Fred Hughes	3,453	27.7	2	
Birmingham East	Joseph James Stephenson	3,958	31.9	2	Engineers
Bishop Auckland	William House	3,993	33.2	2	Miners
Blackburn	Philip Snowden	10,762	28.1	2	ILP
Bolton	Alfred Gill	11,864	30.5	2	Textile Factory Workers
Bow and Bromley	George Lansbury	2,955	33.5	2	ILP
Bradford West	Fred Jowett	8,880	66.6	1	ILP
Bristol East	Frank Sheppard	1,874	31.2	2	Boot and Shoe
Chatham	John Hagan Jenkins	6,130	45.3	2	Shipwrights
Chester-le-Street	John Wilkinson Taylor	12,684	64.8	1	Miners
Chesterfield	James Haslam	8,234	59.1	1	Miners
Clitheroe	David Shackleton	13,873	67.3	1	Textile Factory Workers
Cockermouth	Percy Whitehead	1,909	18.9	3	Steel Smelters
Crewe	Frank Herbert Rose	1,380	9.5	3	Engineers
Deptford	C. W. Bowerman	6,880	52.0	1	Compositors
Derby	James Henry Thomas	10,189	27.9	2	Railway Servants
Dundee	Alexander Wilkie	10,365	32.9	2	Shipwrights
Eccles	George Henry Stuart	3,511	20.3	3	Postmen
Gateshead	John Johnson	3,572	21.4	3	Miners
Glasgow Blackfriars and Hutchesontown	George Nicoll Barnes	4,496	61.7	1	Engineers
Glasgow Camlachie	James O'Connor Kessack	2,443	28.9	3	ILP
Gorton	John Hodge	7,807	51.6	1	Steel Smelters
Govan	James Thomas Brownlie	3,545	23.3	3	Engineers
Gower	John Williams	9,312	78.6	1	Miners
Halifax	James Parker	9,093	38.9	2	ILP
Hallamshire	John Wadsworth	10,193	62.2	1	Miners
Hanley	Enoch Edwards	9,199	63.9	1	Miners
Holmfirth	William Pickles	1,643	14.9	3	Painters
Huddersfield	Harry Snell	5,686	31.6	2	Fabians
Hyde	William Crawford Anderson	2,401	21.2	3	ILP
Ince	Stephen Walsh	7,723	60.6	1	Miners
Jarrow	Pete Curran	4,818	33.5	2	Gasworkers
Leeds East	James O'Grady	5,873	71.8	1	Furnishing
Leicester	Ramsay Macdonald	14,337	31.4	2	ILP
Leigh	Thomas Greenall	3,268	24.7	3	Miners
Leith Burghs	William Walker	2,724	18.9	3	Carpenters & Joiners
Liverpool Kirkdale	Alexander Gordon Cameron	3,921	48.6	2	Carpenters & Joiners
Liverpool West Toxteth	James Sexton	2,909	42.5	2	Dock Labourers
Manchester East	John Edward Sutton	6,110	54.5	1	Miners
Manchester North East	J. R. Clynes	5,157	58.4	1	ILP
Manchester South West	J. M. McLachlan	1,218	16.6	3	ILP
Merthyr Tydfil	Keir Hardie	13,841	36.7	2	ILP
Mid Derbyshire	John Hancock	7,575	63.9	1	Miners
Middlesbrough	Patrick Walls	2,710	14.2	3	Blastfurnacemen
Mid Lanarkshire	Robert Smillie	3,864	25.7	3	Miners
Morley	Herbert Smith	2,191	16.1	3	Miners
Newcastle-upon-Tyne	Walter Hudson	18,241	28.1	2	Railway Servants
Newton	James Andrew Seddon	7,256	52.7	1	Shop Assistants
Normanton	Frederick Hall	9,172	72.2	1	Miners
North Ayrshire	James Brown	1,801	12.9	3	Miners
North East Derbyshire	William Edwin Harvey	8,715	57.6	1	Miners
North East Lanarkshire	Joseph Sullivan	2,160	11.8	3	Miners
North West Lanarkshire	Robert Small	1,718	9.7	3	Miners
North West Staffordshire	Albert Stanley	8,566	59.8	1	Miners
Norwich	George Henry Roberts	11,119	28.7	2	Typographical
Nuneaton	William Johnson	8,154	50.8	1	Miners
Portsmouth	Williams Sanders	3,529	6.1	5	Fabians
Preston	John Thomas Macpherson	7,539	21.4	3	Steel Smelters
Rhondda	William Abraham	12,436	78.2	1	Miners
St Helens	Thomas Glover	6,512	53.3	1	Miners
Sheffield Attercliffe	Joseph Pointer	7,755	56.1	1	Patternmakers
South Glamorganshire	William Brace	11,612	61.1	1	Miners
Spen Valley	T. Russell Williams	2,514	23.3	3	ILP
Stockport	George James Wardle	6,682	28.0	1	Railway Servants
Sunderland	Thomas Summerbell	11,058	23.4	4	ILP
Tewkesbury	Charles Fox	238	2.1	3	ILP
Wakefield	Stanton Coit	2,602	45.5	2	ILP
West Fife	William Adamson	4,736	37.7	2	Miners
West Ham South	Will Thorne	11,791	63.1	1	Gasworkers
Westhoughton	William Tyson Wilson	9,064	53.2	1	Carpenters & Joiners
West Monmouthshire	Thomas Richards	13,295	81.4	1	Miners
Whitehaven	Andrew Sharp	825	28.8	3	Miners
Wigan	Henry Twist	4,803	52.8	1	Miners
Wolverhampton West	Thomas Frederick Richards	5,790	47.6	2	Boot and Shoe
Woolwich	Will Crooks	8,420	49.1	2	Coopers

Gill in Bolton, Hardie in Merthyr Tydfil, Hudson in Newcastle, Macdonald in Leicester, Parker in Halifax, Roberts in Norwich, Snowden in Blackburn, Thomas in Derby and Wilkie in Dundee were elected by taking second place in a multi-seat constituency.

=== By-elections, Jan–Dec 1910 ===
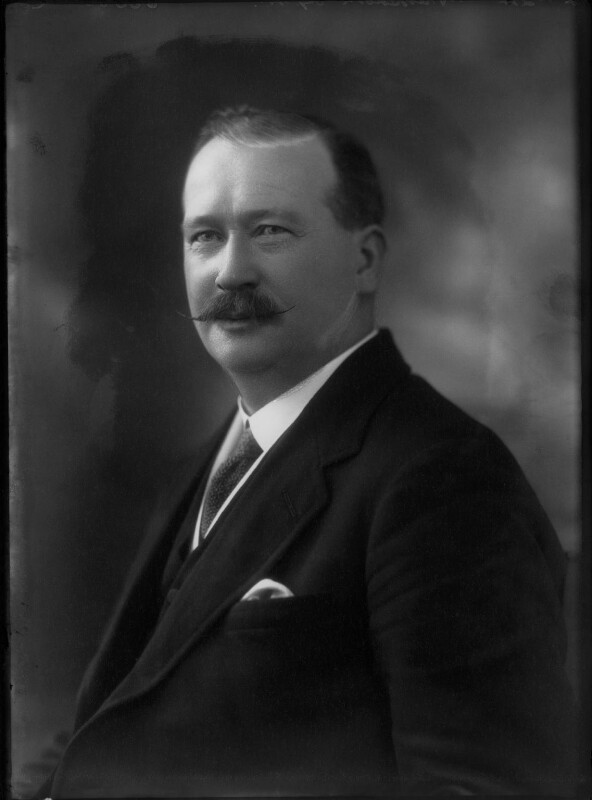
Hartshorn, who stood unsuccessfully in Mid Glamorgan in 1910

By-election	Candidate	Votes	%	Position	Sponsor
1910 Mid Glamorgan by-election	Vernon Hartshorn	6,210	41.0	2	Miners
1910 Liverpool Kirkdale by-election	Alexander Gordon Cameron	3,427	44.5	2	Carpenters & Joiners

=== December 1910 general election ===
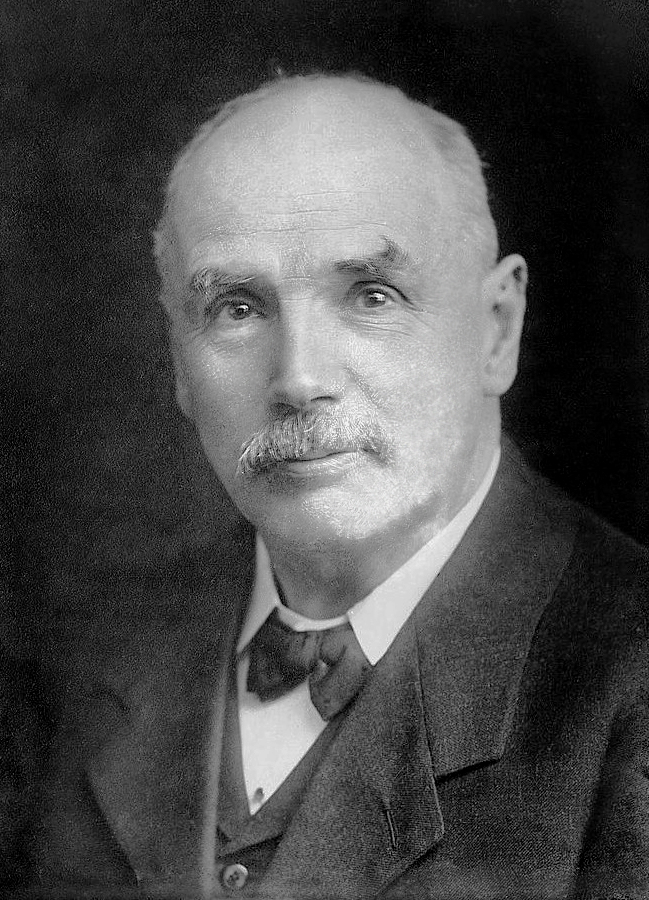
Barnes, leader of the party in December 1910, re-elected in Glasgow Blackfriars and Hutchesontown

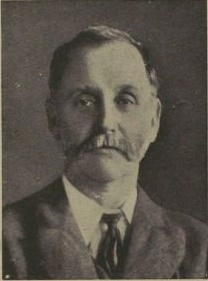
Lansbury, future party leader, newly elected in Bow and Bromley

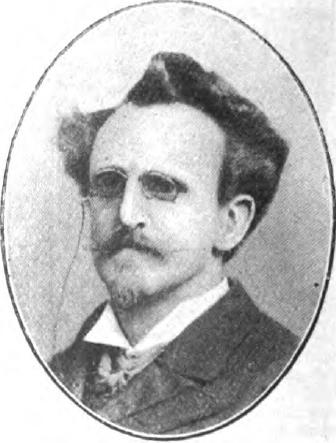
Smith, frequent candidate, unsuccessful in Chatham

Constituency	Candidate	Votes	%	Position	Sponsor
Barnard Castle	Arthur Henderson	5,868	57.0	1	Iron Founders
Barrow-in-Furness	Charles Duncan	4,810	52.9	1	Engineers
Bishop Auckland	William House	3,993	33.2	2	Miners
Blackburn	Philip Snowden	10,762	26.4	1	ILP
Bolton	Alfred Gill	7,729	64.0	2	Textile Factory Workers
Bow and Bromley	George Lansbury	4,315	55.6	1	ILP
Bradford West	Fred Jowett	8,880	66.6	1	ILP
Chatham	Frank Smith	1,103	8.9	3	ILP
Chester-le-Street	John Wilkinson Taylor	unopposed	N/A	1	Miners
Chesterfield	James Haslam	7,283	59.0	1	Miners
Clitheroe	Albert Smith	12,107	67.7	1	Textile Factory Workers
Deptford	C. W. Bowerman	6,357	51.4	1	Compositors
Derby	James Henry Thomas	9,144	34.1	2	Railway Servants
Dundee	Alexander Wilkie	8,957	29.3	2	Shipwrights
East Carmarthenshire	John Henry Williams	1,176	12.6	3	Steel Smelters
East Glamorgan	Charles Stanton	4,675	24.1	3	Miners
Glasgow Blackfriars and Hutchesontown	George Nicoll Barnes	4,162	59.1	1	Engineers
Glasgow Camlachie	James O'Connor Kessack	1,539	18.1	3	ILP
Gorton	John Hodge	7,840	52.2	1	Steel Smelters
Gower	John Williams	5,480	54.8	1	Miners
Halifax	James Parker	8,511	32.3	2	ILP
Hallamshire	John Wadsworth	8,708	59.9	1	Miners
Hanley	Enoch Edwards	8,343	64.2	1	Miners
Huddersfield	Harry Snell	4,988	29.0	3	Fabians
Ince	Stephen Walsh	7,117	57.2	1	Miners
Jarrow	Alexander Gordon Cameron	4,892	30.6	3	Carpenters & Joiners
Leeds East	James O'Grady	4,028	68.0	1	Furnishing
Leeds South	John Badlay	2,706	21.5	3	ILP
Leicester	Ramsay Macdonald	12,998	38.5	2	ILP
Liverpool Kirkdale	Thomas McKerrell	2,992	41.6	2	ILP
Manchester East	John Edward Sutton	5,524	54.3	1	Miners
Manchester North East	J. R. Clynes	4,313	58.4	1	ILP
Merthyr Tydfil	Keir Hardie	11,507	39.6	2	ILP
Mid Derbyshire	John Hancock	6,557	60.5	1	Miners
Mid Glamorganshire	Vernon Hartshorn	6,102	44.5	2	Miners
Mid Lanarkshire	Robert Smillie	3,847	24.7	3	Miners
Newcastle-upon-Tyne	Walter Hudson	16,447	28.0	2	Railway Servants
Newton	James Andrew Seddon	6,562	49.5	2	Shop Assistants
Normanton	Frederick Hall	unopposed	N/A	1	Miners
North East Derbyshire	William Edwin Harvey	7,838	56.3	1	Miners
North West Staffordshire	Albert Stanley	8,125	62.2	1	Miners
Norwich	George Henry Roberts	10,003	35.8	2	Typographical
Nuneaton	William Johnson	8,199	52.2	1	Miners
Preston	William Henry Carr	7,853	23.0	4	Textile Factory Workers
Rhondda	William Abraham	9,073	71.0	1	Miners
St Helens	Thomas Glover	5,752	48.9	2	Miners
Sheffield Attercliffe	Joseph Pointer	6,532	55.0	1	Patternmakers
South Glamorganshire	William Brace	10,910	58.4	1	Miners
Stockport	George James Wardle	6,094	26.9	2	Railway Servants
Sunderland	Frank Goldstone	11,291	25.8	2	Teachers
West Fife	William Adamson	6,128	53.0	1	Miners
West Monmouthshire	Thomas Richards	unopposed	N/A	1	Miners
West Ham South	Will Thorne	9,508	66.4	1	Gasworkers
Westhoughton	William Tyson Wilson	9,064	53.2	1	Carpenters & Joiners
Whitehaven	Thomas Richardson	1,414	53.7	1	ILP and Miners
Wigan	Henry Twist	4,110	46.8	2	Miners
Woolwich	Will Crooks	8,252	50.7	1	Fabians and Coopers

Gill in Bolton, Hardie in Merthyr Tydfil, Hudson in Newcastle, Macdonald in Leicester, Parker in Halifax, Roberts in Norwich, Goldstone in Sunderland, Thomas in Derby, Wardle in Stockport and Wilkie in Dundee were elected by taking second place in a multi-seat constituency.

=== By-elections, 1910–1918 ===
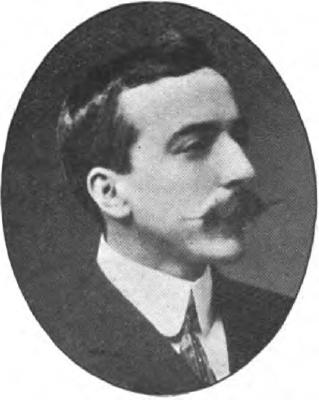
Roberts, winner of a ministerial by-election in Norwich in 1917

By-election	Candidate	Votes	%	Position	Sponsor
1911 North East Lanarkshire by-election	John Robertson	2,879	16.3	3	Miners
1911 Kilmarnock Burghs by-election	Thomas McKerrell	2,761	19.3	3	ILP
1911 Keighley by-election	William Crawford Anderson	3,452	28.9	3	ILP
1911 Oldham by-election	William Cornforth Robinson	7,448	24.6	3	Textile Factory Workers
1912 Holmfirth by-election	William Lunn	3,195	28.2	3	Miners
1912 Hanley by-election	Samuel Finney	1,694	11.8	3	Miners
1912 Crewe by-election	James Holmes	2,485	17.7	3	Railway Servants
1912 Midlothian by-election	Robert Brown	2,415	16.7	3	Miners
1913 Houghton-le-Spring by-election	William House	4,165	26.2	3	Miners
1913 Keighley by-election	William Bland	3,646	29.8	3	ILP
1913 South Lanarkshire by-election	Thomas Gibb	1,674	16.8	3	Miners
1914 North West Durham by-election	G. H. Stuart	5,026	28.2	3	Postmen
1914 Leith Burghs by-election	Joseph Nicholas Bell	3,346	24.5	3	Labour Amalgamation
1914 North East Derbyshire by-election	James Martin	3,669	22.5	3	Miners
1914 Bolton by-election	Robert Tootill	unopposed	N/A	1	Carters & Lurrymen
1914 Sheffield Attercliffe by-election	William Crawford Anderson	unopposed	N/A	1	ILP
1915 Merthyr Tydfil by-election	James Winstone	6,080	37.2	2	Miners
1916 North West Staffordshire by-election	Samuel Finney	unopposed	N/A	1	Miners
1917 Norwich by-election	George Henry Roberts	unopposed	N/A	1	Typographical
1918 Manchester North East by-election	J. R. Clynes	unopposed	N/A	1	ILP

=== 1918 UK general election ===
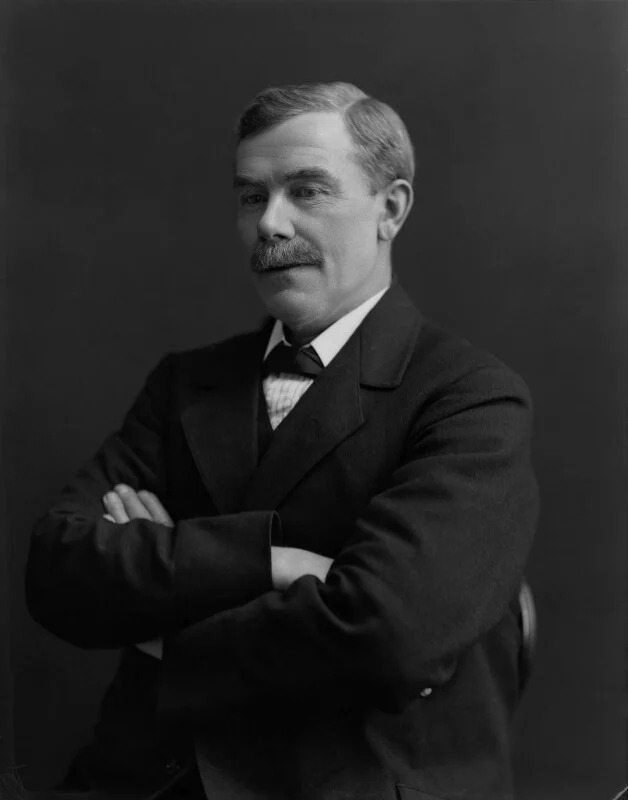
Adamson, leader of the party in 1918, re-elected in West Fife

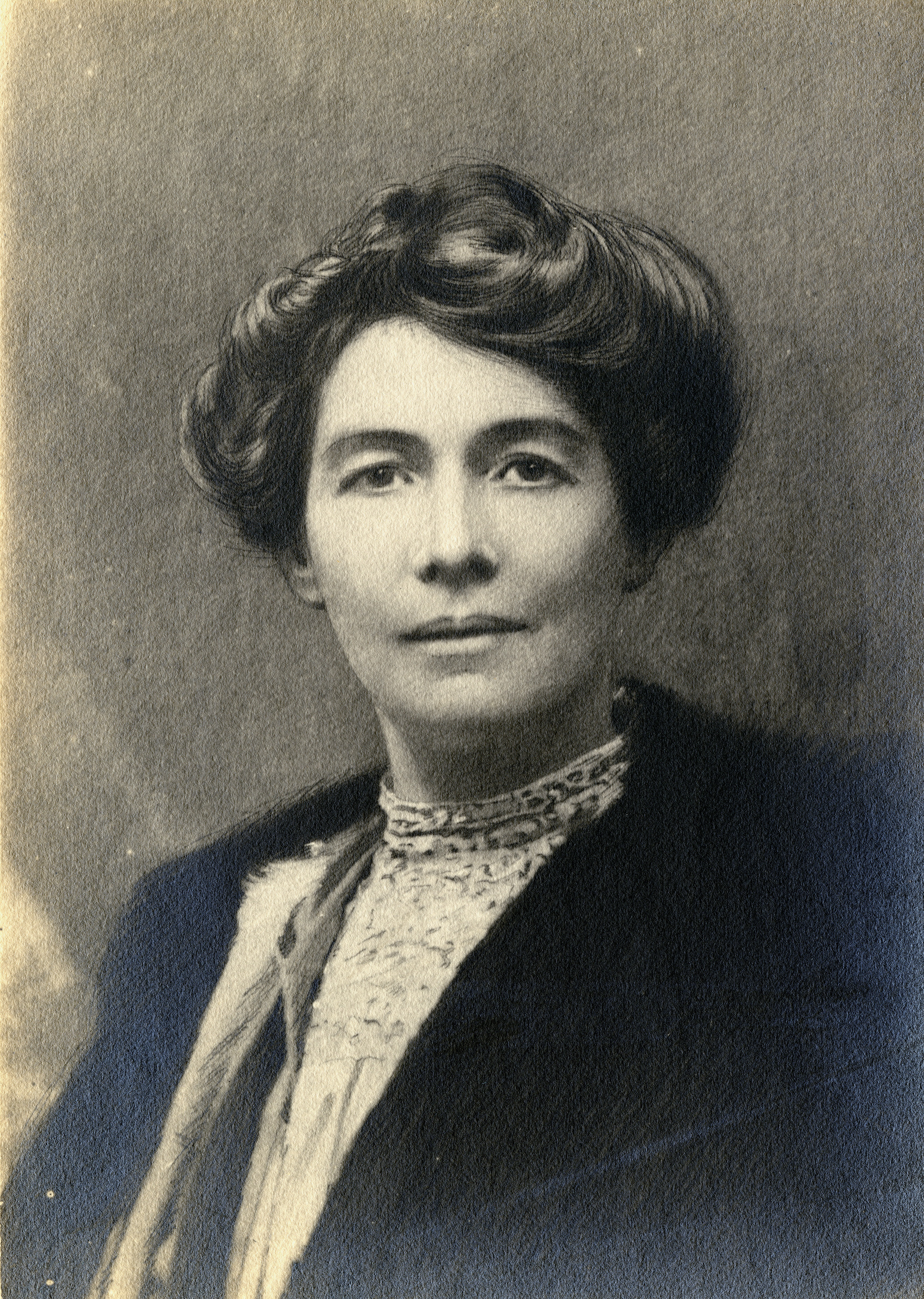
Pethick-Lawrence, one of four women to stand for the party in 1918, defeated in Manchester Rusholme

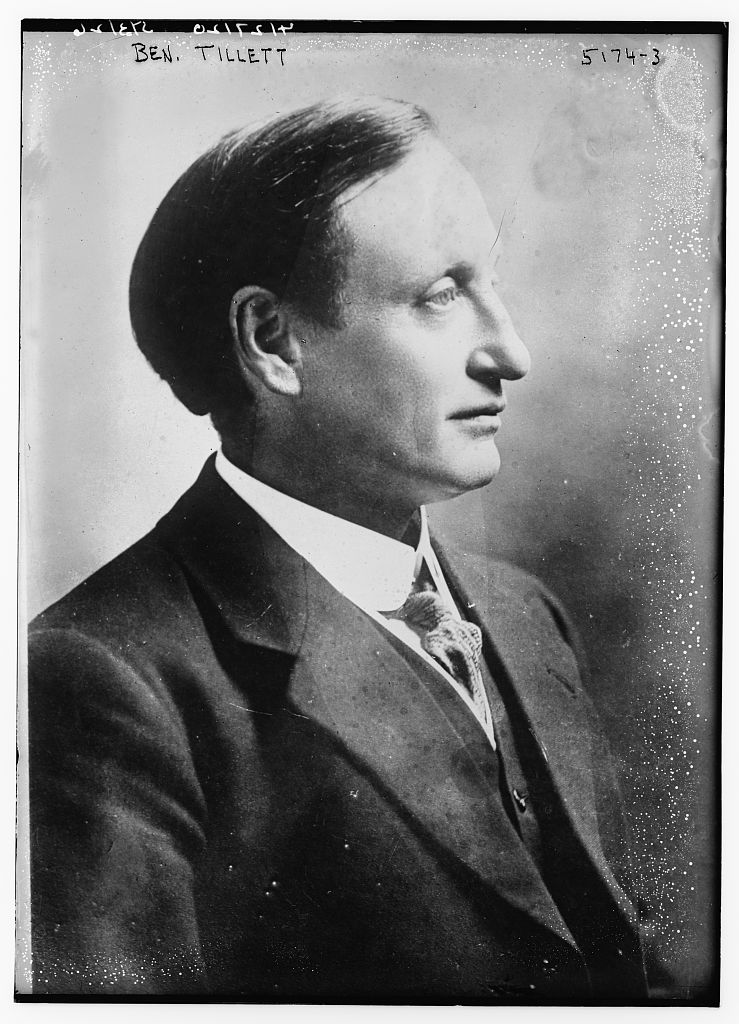
Tillett, newly elected in Salford North

Constituency	Candidate	Votes	%	Position	Sponsor
Aberavon	Robert Williams	7,758	35.7	2	NAUL
Aberdare	T. E. Nicholas	6,229	21.4	2	ILP
Abertillery	William Brace	unopposed	N/A	1	Miners
Accrington	Charles Roden Buxton	6,369	21.7	3	ILP
Acton	Robert Dunsmore	4,241	26.7	2	Constituency
Altrincham	George Middleton	7,685	27.3	2	Postal Clerks
Argyllshire	Lauchlin MacNeill Weir	2,733	18.6	2	Highland Land League
Ayr Burghs	Campbell Stephen	4,534	23.2	3	ILP
Balham and Tooting	Frank Smith	3,586	17.2	2	
Barnard Castle	John Edmund Swan	5,468	42.9	1	Miners
Barrow-in-Furness	Charles Duncan	12,309	49.4	2	Workers
Basingstoke	A. Close	6,277	35.9	2	
Bath	Alfred James Bethell	5,244	25.2	2	
Batley and Morley	Ben Turner	12,051	47.1	2	Textile Workers
Battersea North	Charlotte Despard	5,634	33.4	2	Constituency
Battersea South	Arthur Lynch	3,383	14.7	2	
Bedwellty	Charles Edwards	11,370	53.6	1	Miners
Bermondsey West	Alfred Salter	1,956	18.6	3	ILP
Berwick and Haddington	Robert W. Foulis	4,783	30.0	2	Constituency
Birkenhead East	John Finigan	5,399	26.7	2	
Birkenhead West	William Henry Egan	5,671	31.0	2	
Birmingham Aston	John Banfield	4,451	29.4	2	
Birmingham Erdington	Albert Edward Ayton	5,211	27.1	2	
Birmingham Handsworth	Henry Joseph Odell	4,576	21.5	3	
Birmingham Ladywood	John Kneeshaw	2,572	19.0	2	ILP
Birmingham Moseley	Robert Dunstan	3,789	16.2	2	Constituency
Birmingham Yardley	George Shann	7,466	38.3	2	Constituency
Bishop Auckland	Ben Spoor	10,060	50.6	1	
Blackburn	Philip Snowden	15,274	19.7	3	ILP
Blackpool	Allan Gee	2,608	09.2	3	Textile Workers
Blaydon	William Whiteley	7,844	41.6	2	Miners
Bolton	Robert Tootill	unopposed	N/A	1	General Workers
Bosworth	Thomas Richardson	6,344	33.6	2	ILP
Bothwell	John Robertson	9,027	49.1	2	Miners
Bournemouth	Frederick Jesse Hopkins	5,301	25.0	2	
Bow and Bromley	George Lansbury	7,248	44.3	2	
Bradford Central	William Leach	7,636	31.3	2	ILP
Bradford East	Frederick William Jowett	8,637	37.9	2	ILP
Bradford North	John Henry Palin	6,499	29.2	2	Constituency
Brentford and Chiswick	William Haywood	2,620	20.2	2	Constituency
Bridgwater	Sid Plummer	5,771	31.4	2	Constituency
Brigg	David Quibell	4,789	27.3	2	ILP
Brighton	Thomas Lewis	8,971	10.8	3	
Brighton	George William Canter	8,514	10.2	4	
Bristol Central	Ernest Bevin	7,137	36.8	2	
Bristol East	Luke Bateman	8,135	42.8	2	ILP
Bristol North	James Kaylor	5,007	26.5	2	Engineers
Bristol South	Thomas Lewis	6,409	31.8	2	Dockers
Broxtowe	George Alfred Spencer	11,150	55.2	1	Miners
Buckingham	John Scurr	7,481	32.3	2	Constituency
Buckrose	George Henry Dawson	3,176	20.8	2	
Burnley	Dan Irving	15,217	41.9	1	Socialist
Burslem	Samuel Finney	7,474	44.3	1	Miners
Bury	Harry Wright Wallace	4,973	22.7	3	Postmen
Bute and Northern Ayrshire	Robert Smith	5,848	28.5	2	Constituency
Caerphilly	Alfred Onions	11,496	54.8	1	Miners
Camberwell North	Charles Ammon	2,175	21.0	3	ILP and Fawcett
Camborne	George Nicholls	6,546	48.0	2	
Cambridge	Thomas Rhondda Williams	3,789	24.7	2	
Cambridgeshire	Albert Ernest Stubbs	6,686	34.9	2	Constituency
Cambridge University	J. C. Squire	640	11.1	4	
Canterbury	Edward Timothy Palmer	2,719	19.2	2	Constituency
Cardiff Central	James Ewart Edmunds	4,663	22.4	2	ILP
Cardiff East	Arthur James Williams	5,554	28.5	3	Railwaymen
Cardiff South	Joshua Clatworthy	4,303	26.3	2	Coal Trimmers
Carlisle	Ernest Lowthian	4,736	33.2	2	General Workers
Chatham	Dan W. Hubbard	4,134	22.5	2	Engineers
Chelmsford	William F. Toynbee	5,551	33.1	2	Constituency
Chertsey	Thomas Linsey	3,232	19.3	2	Constituency
Chester	Arthur Mason	2,799	15.7	3	Locomotive Engineers
Chester-le-Street	John Wilkinson Taylor	unopposed	N/A	1	Durham Colliery Mechanics
Chichester	Frederick Ernest Green	6,705	31.6	2	Constituency
Chippenham	Reuben George	2,939	17.7	3	Constituency
Chorley	Elijah Sandham	6,222	32.3	2	ILP
Clay Cross	Frank Hall	6,766	45.9	2	Miners
Cleveland	Harry Dack	8,610	35.3	2	Miners
Clitheroe	Alfred Davies	9,578	44.7	1	Textile Factory Workers
Coatbridge	Owen Coyle	7,254	35.5	2	Constituency
Colchester	Andrew Conley	7,112	38.9	2	Garment Workers
Colne Valley	Wilfrid Whiteley	9,473	41.2	2	ILP
Combined English Universities	John A. Hobson	366	18.4	3	
Combined Scottish Universities	Peter Macdonald	1,581	12.2	4	
Consett	G. H. Stuart-Bunning	7,268	32.8	3	Postmen
Coventry	Richard Collingham Wallhead	10,298	32.4	2	ILP
Crewe	James Thomas Brownlie	10,439	43.8	2	Engineers
Croydon South	Henry Thomas Muggeridge	7,006	28.2	2	
Dartford	William Ling	6,506	29.4	2	Constituency
Darwen	John McGurk	5,211	23.4	3	Miners
Daventry	Will Rogers	7,824	41.2	2	Constituency
Denbigh	Edward Thomas John	2,958	16.7	2	Constituency
Deptford	Charles William Bowerman	14,073	54.4	1	Compositors
Derby	James Henry Thomas	25,145	37.8	1	Railwaymen
Dewsbury	Benjamin Riley	5,596	30.1	2	ILP
Doncaster	Robert Morley	5,153	25.0	2	Workers
Don Valley	Edward Hough	3,226	24.5	3	Miners
Dudley	William Bridgland Steer	6,048	39.8	2	
Dumbarton Burghs	David Kirkwood	10,566	47.4	2	Engineers
Dunbartonshire	William Martin	7,072	30.9	2	ILP
Dundee	Alexander Wilkie	24,822	36.1	2	Shipwrights
Dundee	James Sunney Brown	7,769	11.3	4	
Durham	Joshua Ritson	8,809	49.4	2	Miners
Ealing	Alfred Chilton	3,610	20.8	2	
Eastbourne	Thomas Burleigh Hasdell	4,641	26.0	2	Constituency
East Dorset	Alfred Smith	4,321	26.6	2	Vehicle Workers
East Grinstead	David Pole	6,208	33.0	2	Constituency
East Ham South	Arthur Henderson	5,024	26.9	3	Ironfounders
East Renfrewshire	Robert Spence	5,048	27.8	2	Constituency
Ebbw Vale	Thomas Richards	unopposed	N/A	1	Miners
Edinburgh Central	William Graham	7,161	51.3	1	ILP
Edinburgh West	John Alexander Young	2,622	14.6	3	
Edmonton	Frank Broad	3,575	25.7	2	Socialist
Elland	Dennis Hardaker	5,923	25.6	3	Constituency
Enfield	William E. Hill	6,176	37.5	2	Railway Clerks
Epsom	James Chuter Ede	4,796	26.1	2	Constituency
Evesham	Walter Metcalfe Fielding	2,863	16.9	3	Constituency
Farnham	John Hayes	3,534	24.6	2	Constituency
Farnworth	Thomas Greenall	9,740	40.8	2	Miners
Faversham	Stanley Morgan	5,981	31.8	2	Constituency
Finchley	John Leslie	3,140	18.2	2	Constituency
Forest of Dean	James Wignall	9,731	62.8	1	Dockers
Frome	Edward Gill	10,454	43.9	2	Miners
Fulham East	David Cook	2,883	19.5	2	
Fulham West	Robert Mark Gentry	4,435	23.7	2	
Fylde	William John Tout	7,400	35.1	2	Textile Factory Workers
Gateshead	John Brotherton	7,212	23.8	2	Engineers
Gillingham	William Tapp	4,705	25.9	2	Shipwrights
Glasgow Bridgeton	James Maxton	7,860	39.8	2	ILP
Glasgow Camlachie	Hugh Guthrie	7,192	33.1	2	ILP
Glasgow Cathcart	Gavin Brown Clark	4,489	21.6	2	
Glasgow Central	David Quin	4,736	21.2	2	
Glasgow Gorbals	John Maclean	7,436	34.1	2	Socialist
Glasgow Govan	Neil Maclean	9,577	47.8	1	ILP
Glasgow Hillhead	John Izett	4,186	24.6	2	ILP
Glasgow Maryhill	John William Muir	5,531	27.9	2	
Partick	William Mackie	5,173	29.9	2	
Glasgow St Rollox	James Stewart	6,147	33.2	2	ILP
Glasgow Shettleston	John Wheatley	9,827	49.8	2	ILP
Glasgow Springburn	George Hardie	7,996	39.1	2	ILP
Gloucester	William Levason Edwards	2,860	17.3	3	
Gower	John Williams	10,109	54.8	1	Miners
Gravesend	James Butts	3,254	21.5	2	Engineers
Great Yarmouth	William McConnell	1,848	12.8	3	Socialist
Greenwich	James Bermingham	6,471	30.7	2	
Grimsby	Charles Franklin	9,015	35.4	2	Socialist
Guildford	William Bennett	5,078	27.9	2	Constituency
Hamilton	Duncan Macgregor Graham	6,988	42.1	1	Miners
Hammersmith North	Christopher Morden	2,048	16.4	4	
Hammersmith South	John Westcott	1,958	14.9	3	
Hampstead	Skene Mackay	3,646	19.3	2	
Hanley	Myles Harper Parker	7,697	38.7	2	Enginemen
Harborough	Walter John Baker	4,495	25.6	3	Postal Clerks
The Hartlepools	Will Sherwood	4,733	18.6	3	General Workers
Hastings	Joseph George Butler	3,556	24.1	2	Socialist
Hemel Hempstead	Jesse Hawkes	2,913	22.4	2	Constituency
Hemsworth	John Guest	8,102	55.5	1	Miners
Hendon	Frank Bailey	3,159	16.1	2	Constituency
Hereford	Sidney Box	3,730	24.2	2	Constituency
Hertford	Cyril Harding	1,679	09.1	3	Constituency
Hexham	William Weir	4,168	26.2	2	Miners
Heywood and Radcliffe	Horace Nobbs	6,827	32.4	2	Postal Clerks
Hitchin	Robert Green	5,661	34.9	2	Constituency
Holland-with-Boston	William Stapleton Royce	8,788	39.8	1	Constituency
Houghton-le-Spring	Robert Richardson	7,315	36.4	1	Miners
Huddersfield	Harry Snell	12,737	32.5	2	ILP
Hythe	Robert William Forsyth	3,427	28.0	2	
Ilford	Herbert Dunnico	4,621	19.5	2	
Ilkeston	George Oliver	7,962	45.2	2	Engineers
Ince	Stephen Walsh	14,882	87.0	1	Miners
Ipswich	Robert Frederick Jackson	8,143	32.1	2	ILP
Islington East	Arthur John Lewer	3,122	16.3	3	
Islington West	John Thomas Sheppard	2,300	20.9	3	Engineers
Jarrow	John Hill	8,034	39.0	2	
Keighley	William Bland	6,324	27.7	3	ILP
Kennington	William Glennie	2,817	25.4	3	Engineers
Kensington North	William Joseph Jarrett	3,653	21.7	2	Constituency
Kidderminster	John Baker	9,760	42.0	2	Iron & Steel
King's Lynn	Robert Barrie Walker	9,780	49.1	2	Agricultural
Kingston upon Hull East	R. H. Farrah	3,725	20.4	3	Constituency
Kingston upon Hull North West	Alfred Gould	3,528	19.3	3	Carpenters & Joiners
Kingston upon Hull South West	Robert Mell	3,121	19.3	3	ILP
Kingston-upon-Thames	Thomas Henry Dumper	2,502	13.6	2	
Kingswinford	Charles Henry Sitch	10,397	48.0	1	Chain Makers
Lanark	James C. Welsh	5,821	31.0	2	ILP
Leeds North	George Hartley Thompson	3,423	18.4	2	Constituency
Leeds North East	John Bromley	4,450	24.5	2	Locomotive Engineers
Leeds South	Frank Fountain	5,510	31.5	2	
Leeds South East	James O'Grady	unopposed	N/A	1	Furnishing Trades
Leeds West	John Arnott	6,020	29.5	2	ILP
Leek	William Bromfield	10,510	51.7	1	Midland Textile
Leicester East	George Banton	6,697	27.1	2	ILP
Leicester South	Frederick Fox Riley	5,463	22.8	2	Postal Clerks
Leicester West	Ramsay MacDonald	6,347	24.0	2	ILP
Leigh	Richard Owen Jones	11,146	46.4	2	Engineers
Leith	Stanley Burgess	4,251	19.1	3	Engineers
Lewes	Tom Pargeter	4,164	33.6	2	Constituency
Leyton East	William Carter	3,669	30.3	3	
Lichfield	T. Riley	5,548	36.4	2	Miners
Lincoln	Robert Arthur Taylor	6,658	28.5	2	Engineers
Linlithgowshire	Manny Shinwell	8,723	40.3	2	ILP
Liverpool Edge Hill	Peter Tevenan	5,587	36.2	2	Constituency
Liverpool Fairfield	George Porter	3,337	21.9	3	
Liverpool Kirkdale	Samuel Mason	5,012	32.6	2	
Liverpool Walton	Dixon Smith	4,580	28.6	2	Blind
Liverpool Wavertree	Charles Wilson	5,103	27.0	2	
Liverpool West Derby	George Nelson	5,618	36.2	2	Constituency
Liverpool West Toxteth	William Albert Robinson	6,850	34.4	2	Warehouse Workers
Llandaff and Barry	Russell Lowell Jones	6,607	30.8	2	
Llanelli	John Henry Williams	14,409	46.9	2	Constituency
London University	Sidney Webb	2,141	31.7	2	
Lonsdale	David Hunter	4,472	24.3	2	Constituency
Loughborough	Herbert William Hallam	6,381	34.9	2	Constituency
Luton	Willet Ball	5,964	30.6	2	Constituency
Macclesfield	William Pimblott	10,253	41.8	2	Constituency
Maidstone	Frederick George Burgess	6,277	34.5	2	Constituency
Maldon	George Dallas	6,315	39.6	2	Constituency
Manchester Ardwick	Thomas Lowth	5,670	31.8	2	Railwaymen
Manchester Blackley	Arnold Townend	3,659	25.0	2	Railway Clerks
Manchester Clayton	John Edward Sutton	7,654	38.4	2	Miners
Manchester Gorton	John Hodge	13,047	67.4	1	Iron & Steel
Manchester Platting	John Robert Clynes	unopposed	N/A	1	General Workers
Manchester Rusholme	Emmeline Pethick-Lawrence	2,985	15.6	3	Constituency
Mansfield	William Carter	8,957	43.6	1	Miners
Merthyr	James Winstone	12,682	47.3	2	Miners
Middlesbrough East	Frederick William Carey	3,776	30.8	2	
Middlesbrough West	Charlie Cramp	5,350	32.8	2	Railwaymen
Middleton and Prestwich	John B. Battle	6,501	30.5	2	
Montrose Burghs	Henry Noel Brailsford	2,940	24.0	2	ILP
Morpeth	John Cairns	7,677	34.3	1	Miners
Motherwell	Walton Newbold	4,135	23.2	2	ILP
Neath	Herbert Morgan	9,670	35.2	2	Constituency
Nelson and Colne	Albert Smith	14,075	62.0	1	Textile Factory Workers
Newcastle-upon-Tyne Central	James Smith	4,976	34.6	2	ILP
Newcastle-upon-Tyne East	Walter Hudson	5,195	34.7	2	Railwaymen
Newcastle-upon-Tyne North	Robert John Wilson	3,102	16.5	3	Constituency
Newcastle-upon-Tyne West	David Adams	6,411	33.4	2	Engineers
Newport (Monmouthshire)	John William Bowen	10,234	41.0	2	Postmen
Newton	Robert Young	9,808	55.0	1	Engineers
Normanton	Frederick Hall	unopposed	N/A	1	Miners
Northampton	Walter Halls	10,735	37.3	2	
North East Derbyshire	Frank Lee	5,560	28.6	2	Miners
North Lanarkshire	Joseph Sullivan	5,673	34.1	2	Miners
Norwich	Herbert Witard	6,856	11.6	3	Constituency
Nottingham East	Thomas Proctor	2,817	19.4	2	Engineers
Nottingham West	Arthur Hayday	7,286	56.8	1	General Workers
Nuneaton	Ivor Gregory	6,269	25.8	2	Locomotive Engineers
Ogmore	Vernon Hartshorn	unopposed	N/A	1	Miners
Oldham	William Cornforth Robinson	15,178	19.6	3	Textile Factory Workers
Ormskirk	James Bell	6,545	37.2	1	Textile Factory Workers
Oswestry	Thomas Morris	8,467	40.8	2	Miners
Oxford University	Henry Sanderson Furniss	335	06.0	4	
Peckham	Charles Diamond	2,559	16.1	3	
Peebles and Southern Midlothian	James Gold	4,830	39.4	2	Miners
Pembrokeshire	Ivor Gwynne	7,712	28.0	2	Tin and Sheet Millmen
Peterborough	John Mansfield	8,832	41.0	2	Constituency
Petersfield	John Pile	4,267	28.5	2	Constituency
Plymouth Devonport	Fred Bramley	4,115	19.3	2	Furnishing
Plymouth Sutton	William Thomas Gay	5,334	20.6	2	
Pontefract	Isaac Burns	5,047	37.1	2	Miners
Pontypool	Thomas Griffiths	8,348	38.8	1	Iron & Steel
Pontypridd	David Lewis Davies	10,152	42.8	2	Miners
Poplar South	Samuel March	4,446	25.6	2	
Portsmouth Central	Hugh Hinshelwood	4,004	19.1	3	Socialist
Portsmouth South	James Lacey	3,070	13.2	3	
Preston	Tom Shaw	19,213	25.8	1	Textile Factory Workers
Pudsey and Otley	George Ripley Carter	4,583	24.8	2	Constituency
Reading	Thomas Charles Morris	8,410	29.8	2	Railwaymen
Rhondda East	David Watts-Morgan	unopposed	N/A	1	Miners
Rhondda West	William Abraham	unopposed	N/A	1	Miners
Rochdale	R. H. Tawney	4,956	16.5	3	ILP
Romford	Walter Henry Letts	5,044	28.1	2	Constituency
Ross and Cromarty	Hector Munro	2,278	21.4	2	
Rossendale	Gilbert Wright Jones	7,984	35.1	2	Textile Factory Workers
Rotherham	James Walker	9,757	38.1	2	Iron & Steel
Rotherhithe	Will Godfrey	1,750	15.5	3	
Rother Valley	Thomas Walter Grundy	9,917	55.1	1	Miners
Rothwell	William Lunn	9,098	44.1	1	Miners
Roxburgh and Selkirk	Thomas Hamilton	5,574	29.9	2	Constituency
Royton	James Crinion	4,875	22.4	2	
Rushcliffe	Charles Harris	6,180	29.9	2	Constituency
Rutland and Stamford	Fleming Eccles	7,639	46.4	2	General Workers
Rutherglen	William Regan	8,759	40.9	2	ILP
Saffron Walden	James Joseph Mallon	4,531	29.9	2	Constituency
St Helens	James Sexton	15,583	57.1	1	Dock Labourers
St Ives	Albert Dunn	6,659	38.4	2	Constituency
St Pancras North	John Gilbert Dale	4,651	26.6	3	Prison Officers
St Pancras South East	Herbert George Romeril	2,189	16.9	4	Railway Clerks
Salford North	Ben Tillett	12,079	74.4	1	Dockers
Salford South	James Gorman	3,807	19.0	2	Engineers
Salford West	Rhys John Davies	4,503	23.1	3	Constituency
Scarborough and Whitby	John Watson Rowntree	1,025	04.9	3	Constituency
Seaham	John James Lawson	8,988	41.3	2	Miners
Sedgefield	John Herriotts	5,801	36.8	2	Miners
Sevenoaks	John Ephraim Skinner	3,323	23.8	2	
Sheffield Attercliffe	William Crawford Anderson	6,539	34.7	2	ILP
Sheffield Brightside	Richard Edward Jones	6,781	35.8	2	Engineers
Sheffield Park	Alf Barton	3,167	20.4	2	Socialist
Shipley	Tom Snowden	5,690	25.4	2	ILP
Shrewsbury	Arthur Taylor	5,542	36.1	2	Engineers
Smethwick	John Davison	9,389	52.2	1	Ironfounders
Southampton	Tommy Lewis	7,828	10.6	4	Socialist
Southampton	Frederick Perriman	6,776	09.2	5	ILP
South Ayrshire	James Brown	6,358	37.3	1	Miners
South Derbyshire	Samuel Truman	7,923	33.8	2	Constituency
South Dorset	Brett Morgan	5,159	31.6	2	Constituency
South East Essex	Joe Cotter	5,343	29.0	2	Ship Stewards
South Norfolk	George Edwards	6,536	35.7	2	Agricultural
Southport	Arthur Greenwood	5,727	28.0	2	
South Shields	George John Rowe	6,425	24.8	2	
Southwark Central	Leslie Haden-Guest	3,126	27.9	2	
Southwark North	George Alfred Isaacs	2,027	22.4	3	Printers' Assistants
Southwark South East	Thomas Ellis Naylor	2,718	27.4	2	London Compositors
Sowerby	John William Ogden	7,306	32.7	2	Textile Factory Workers
Spelthorne	Frank Ernest Horton	2,418	15.1	2	Constituency
Spennymoor	Joseph Batey	8,196	46.5	2	Miners
Spen Valley	Tom Myers	8,508	44.4	2	Constituency
Stalybridge and Hyde	Walter Fowden	6,508	24.8	2	ILP
Stepney Limehouse	Daniel Desmond Sheehan	2,470	25.2	2	
Stepney Mile End	William Devenay	2,392	25.1	2	
Stirling and Falkirk	Archibald Logan	5,201	35.7	2	Iron Moulders
Stourbridge	Mary Reid Anderson	7,587	32.7	2	Women Workers
Stretford	Joseph Hallsworth	5,216	23.3	2	Constituency
Stroud	Charles Wye Kendall	8,522	40.1	2	Constituency
Sudbury	Joseph Rouse Hicks	390	3.0	3	
Sunderland	Frank Goldstone	9,578	15.2	3	Teachers
Swansea East	David Williams	6,341	36.4	2	ILP
Swansea West	John James Powesland	5,510	25.6	3	
Swindon	Joseph Compton	8,393	39.9	2	Coachmakers
Taunton	George Saville Woods	4,816	27.6	2	Constituency
Tiverton	Donald B. Fraser	2,377	14.1	3	Constituency
Tonbridge	John Palmer	5,006	23.3	2	Constituency
Torquay	Alfred Trestrail	4,029	18.9	2	Constituency
Tottenham South	Leo Chiozza Money	5,779	37.0	2	
Twickenham	Humphrey Chalmers	2,823	16.8	2	Constituency
Tynemouth	George Harold Humphries	2,566	15.2	3	
University of Wales	Millicent Mackenzie	176	19.2	2	
Uxbridge	Harry Gosling	6,251	37.6	2	Watermen
Wakefield	Albert Bellamy	5,882	33.7	2	Railwaymen
Wallasey	Walter Citrine	4,384	16.6	2	Electrical
Wallsend	John Chapman	6,835	34.0	2	Constituency
Walsall	Joseph Thickett	8,336	30.0	2	
Walthamstow West	Valentine McEntee	4,167	29.3	2	Socialist, Carpenters & Joiners
Wandsworth Central	George Pearce Blizard	3,382	23.9	2	
Wansbeck	Ebenezer Edwards	5,267	47.5	2	Miners
Warrington	Isaac Brassington	5,377	22.6	3	Railwaymen
Waterloo	Samuel Reeves	2,619	16.5	2	Constituency
Watford	George Lathan	4,952	25.4	2	Railway Clerks
Wednesbury	Alfred Short	11,341	49.8	1	Boilermakers
Wellingborough	Walter Robert Smith	10,290	52.5	1	Boot & Shoe
Wentworth	George Henry Hirst	13,029	59.8	1	Miners
West Bromwich	Frederick Owen Roberts	11,572	54.0	1	Typographical
West Fife	William Adamson	10,664	72.6	1	Miners
West Renfrewshire	Robert Murray	7,126	38.2	2	ILP
West Stirlingshire	Tom Johnston	3,809	28.7	2	ILP
Westbury	Ernest Nathaniel Bennett	3,537	18.8	3	Constituency
West Ham Plaistow	Will Thorne	12,156	94.9	1	General Workers
West Ham Silvertown	David John Davis	2,278	16.9	3	ILP
West Ham Upton	Benjamin Walter Gardner	3,186	22.2	2	ILP
Westhoughton	William Tyson Wilson	11,849	63.9	1	Carpenters & Joiners
Whitechapel and St George's	Robert Ambrose	2,522	29.2	2	
Whitehaven	Thomas Gavan Duffy	9,016	45.6	2	Cumberland Iron Miners
Widnes	Tom Williamson	7,821	40.4	2	NAUL
Wigan	John Parkinson	12,914	48.0	1	Miners
Willesden East	Henry James Lincoln	4,941	25.0	2	Postmen
Willesden West	Samuel Viant	7,217	37.2	2	Carpenters & Joiners
Wolverhampton Bilston	John William Kynaston	6,744	39.5	2	
Wolverhampton West	Alexander Walkden	10,158	42.2	2	Railway Clerks
Wood Green	Harri Tudor Rhys	4,539	17.0	2	Constituency
Woolwich East	Will Crooks	unopposed	N/A	1	Coopers
Woolwich West	Alexander Gordon Cameron	7,088	34.5	2	Carpenters & Joiners
Workington	Thomas Cape	10,441	51.4	1	Miners
Wrexham	Hugh Hughes	6,500	23.7	2	
Yeovil	William Thomas Kelly	7,589	36.4	2	Engineers
York	Thomas Harry Gill	4,822	18.0	3	Railway Clerks

Wilkie won in Dundee won by taking second place in a two-seat constituency.

=== By-elections, 1918–1922 ===
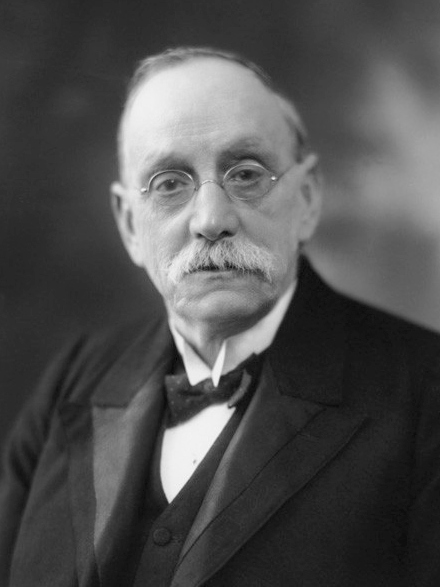
Edwards, elected in South Norfolk in 1920

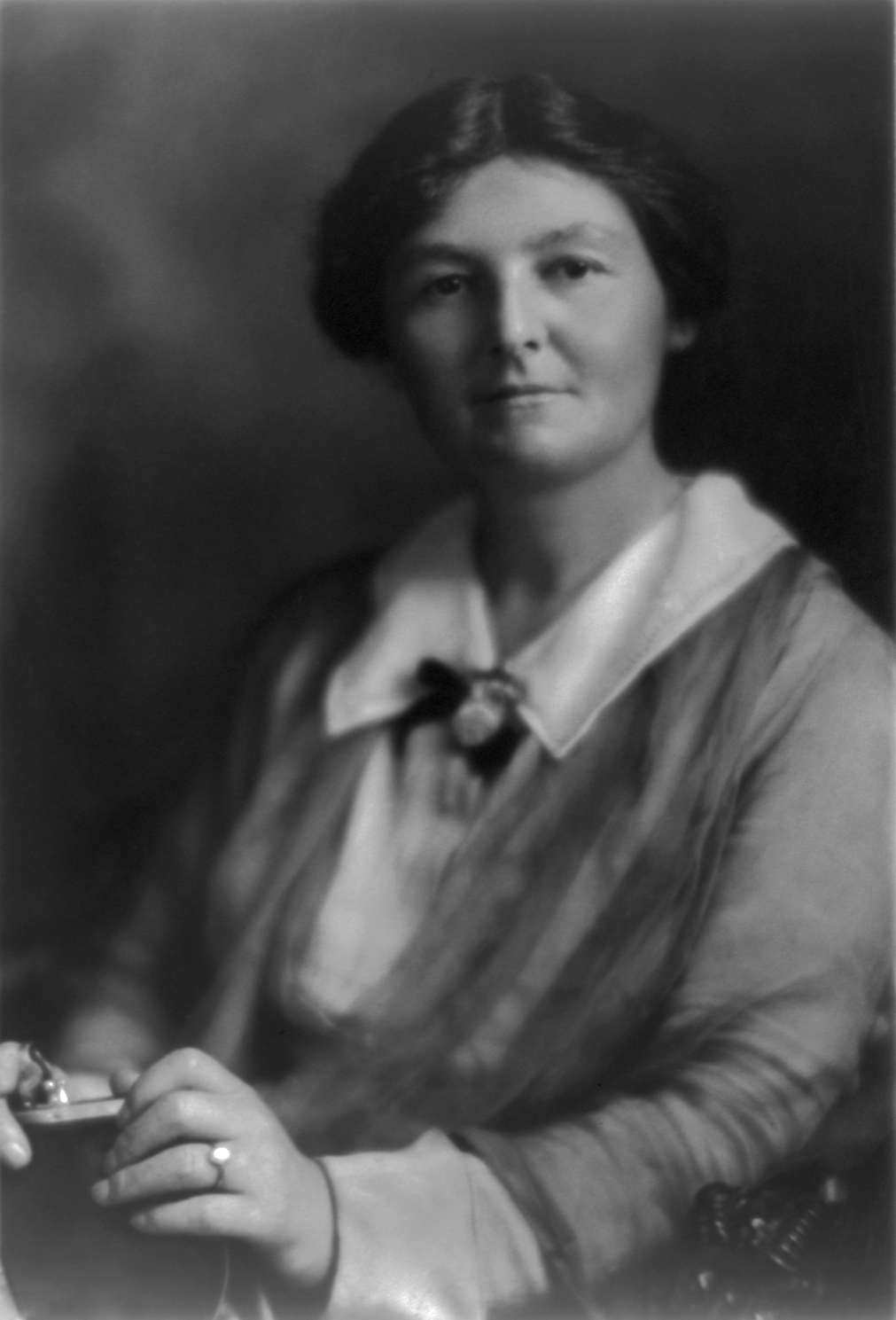
Bondfield, narrowly defeated in Northampton in 1920

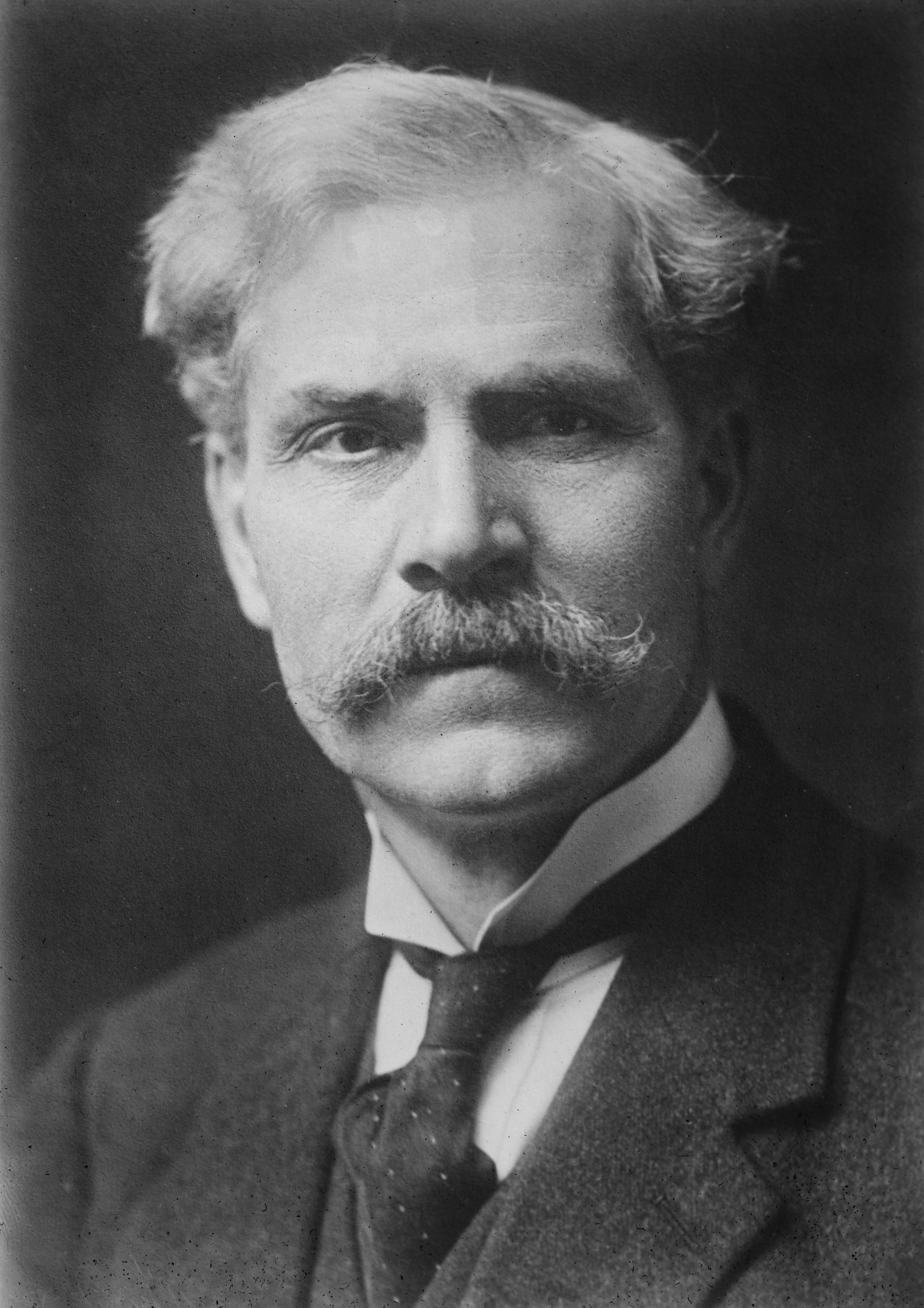
MacDonald, former party leader, unsuccessful in Woolwich East in 1921

By-election	Candidate	Votes	%	Position	Sponsor
1919 Liverpool West Derby by-election	George Nelson	4,670	43.5	2	Constituency
1919 Aberdeenshire and Kincardineshire Central by-election	Joseph Forbes Duncan	3,482	26.4	3	ILP
1919 Swansea East by-election	David Williams	8,158	46.9	2	ILP
1919 Bothwell by-election	John Robertson	13,135	68.8	1	Miners
1919 Widnes by-election	Arthur Henderson	11,404	52.3	1	Iron Founders
1919 Pontefract by-election	Isaac Burns	8,445	46.0	2	Miners
1919 Manchester Rusholme by-election	Robert Dunstan	6,412	31.2	2	ILP
1919 Chester-le-Street by-election	Jack Lawson	17,838	77.1	1	Miners
1919 Plymouth Sutton by-election	William Thomas Gay	9,292	33.3	2	
1919 St Albans by-election	John W. Brown	8,908	42.4	2	Shipping Clerks
1919 Bromley by-election	Francis Percy Hodes	10,077	47.5	2	
1919 Spen Valley by-election	Tom Myers	11,962	39.4	1	ILP
1920 Ashton-under-Lyne by-election	William Cornforth Robinson	8,127	39.6	2	Textile Factory Workers
February 1920 The Wrekin by-election	Charles Duncan	8,729	38.4	2	Workers
1920 Horncastle by-election	William Holmes	3,443	18.8	3	Agricultural Workers
1920 Argyll by-election	Malcolm MacCallum	5,498	35.1	2	Highland Land League
1920 Dartford by-election	John Edmund Mills	13,610	50.2	1	
1920 Stockport by-election	Leo Chiozza Money	16,042	18.0	3	
1920 Basingstoke by-election	James H. Round	5,352	27.8	3	
1920 Camberwell North West by-election	Susan Lawrence	4,733	32.1	2	
1920 Northampton by-election	Margaret Bondfield	13,279	44.4	2	Shop Assistants
1920 Edinburgh North by-election	David Pole	3,808	17.1	3	
1920 Sunderland by-election	Vickerman Henzell Rutherford	14,379	34.0	2	
1920 Nelson and Colne by-election	Robinson Graham	14,134	49.5	1	
1920 Ebbw Vale by-election	Evan Davies	unopposed	N/A	1	
1920 South Norfolk by-election	George Edwards	8,594	45.7	1	Agricultural
1920 Woodbridge by-election	Henry Devenish Harben	8,707	46.8	2	
1920 Ilford by-election	Joseph King	6,577	22.9	2	
November 1920 The Wrekin by-election	Charles Duncan	10,600	42.1	2	
1920 Abertillery by-election	George Barker	15,942	66.4	1	Miners
1920 Rhondda West by-election	William John	14,035	58.5	1	
1921 Woolwich East by-election	Ramsay MacDonald	13,081	48.7	2	ILP
1921 Dudley by-election	James Wilson	10,244	50.7	1	Railwaymen
1921 Kirkcaldy Burghs by-election	Tom Kennedy	11,674	53.4	1	NSP
1921 Penistone by-election	William Gillis	8,560	36.2	1	Miners
1921 Taunton by-election	James Lunnon	8,290	38.9	2	Agricultural Workers
1921 Bedford by-election	Frederick Fox Riley	9,731	40.3	2	Post Office Workers
1921 Hastings by-election	Richard Davies	5,437	25.5	2	Constituency
1921 Heywood and Radcliffe by-election	Walter Halls	13,430	41.7	1	Railwaymen
1921 Caerphilly by-election	Morgan Jones	13,699	54.2	1	ILP
1921 Louth by-election	James L. George	3,873	19.5	3	Constituency
1921 Westhoughton by-election	Rhys Davies	14,876	58.4	1	Distributive Workers
1921 Southwark South East by-election	Thomas Ellis Naylor	6,561	57.0	1	London Compositors
1922 Tamworth by-election	George Henry Jones	6,671	31.2	2	Miners
1922 Manchester Clayton by-election	John Edward Sutton	14,662	57.1	1	Miners
1922 Camberwell North by-election	Charles Ammon	7,854	53.9	1	Post Office Workers
1922 Wolverhampton West by-election	Alexander Walkden	13,799	45.1	2	Railway Clerks
1922 Cambridge by-election	Hugh Dalton	6,954	31.1	2	Constituency
1922 Leicester East by-election	George Banton	14,062	52.9	1	ILP
1922 Nottingham East by-election	A. H. Jones	5,431	27.3	2	Co-op
1922 Gower by-election	David Rhys Grenfell	13,296	57.5	1	Miners
1922 Pontypridd by-election	Thomas Isaac Mardy Jones	16,630	57.0	1	Miners
1922 Hackney South by-election	Holford Knight	9,046	49.8	2	
1922 Newport by-election	John William Bowen	11,425	33.8	2	Post Office Workers

== See also ==
- Labour Representation Committee election results
