= Labour Representation Committee election results =

UK political party election results

This article lists the Labour Representation Committee's election results in UK parliamentary elections. The Labour Representation was the forerunner of the Labour Party. It was founded in 1900 and became the Labour Party in 1906, shortly after that year's general election.

== Summary of general election performance ==
Year	Number of Candidates	Total votes	Average votes per candidate	% UK vote	Change (percentage points)	Number of MPs
1900	15	62,698	4,780	1.8	N/A	2
1906	50	321,723	6,434	4.8	+3.0	29

== Election results ==
=== 1900 general election ===
Constituency	Candidate	Votes	%	Position	Sponsorship
Ashton-under-Lyne	James Johnston	737	11.0	3	ILP
Blackburn	Philip Snowden	7,096	25.6	3	ILP
Bow and Bromley	George Lansbury	2,558	36.7	2	SDF
Bradford West	Fred Jowett	4,949	49.8	2	ILP
Derby	Richard Bell	7,640	25.7	2	Railway Servants
Gower	John Hodge	3,853	47.4	2	Steel Smelters
Halifax	James Parker	3,276	16.1	4	ILP
Leeds East	William Pollard Byles	1,266	19.7	3	Leeds Trades Council
Leicester	Ramsay MacDonald	4,164	13.0	4	ILP
Manchester South West	Fred Brocklehurst	2,394	37.4	2	ILP
Merthyr Tydfil	Keir Hardie	5,745	31.3	2	ILP
Preston	Keir Hardie	4,834	22.1	3	ILP
Rochdale	Allen Clarke	901	8.0	3	ILP and SDF
Sunderland	Alexander Wilkie	8,842	23.6	4	Shipwrights
West Ham South	Will Thorne	4,439	44.2	2	Gasworkers

Hardie stood in two constituencies and was elected in Merthyr Tydfil, where he placed second in a two-seat constituency; Bell was similarly elected in Derby.

=== By-elections, 1900–1906 ===
By-election	Candidate	Votes	%	Position	Sponsorship
1902 Wakefield by-election	Philip Snowden	1,979	40.1	2	ILP
1902 Clitheroe by-election	David James Shackleton	unopposed	N/A	1	Clitheroe LRC
1903 Woolwich by-election	Will Crooks	8,687	61.4	1	Woolwich Trades Council
1903 Preston by-election	John Hodge	6,490	42.9	2	Steel Smelters
1903 Barnard Castle by-election	Arthur Henderson	3,370	35.4	1	Ironfounders
1904 Norwich by-election	George Henry Roberts	2,440	13.7	3	ILP
1905 Belfast North by-election	William Walker	3,966	47.2	2	Carpenters

=== 1906 general election ===
Constituency	Candidate	Votes	%	Position	Sponsorship
Barnard Castle	Arthur Henderson	5,540	58.8	1	Ironfounders
Barrow-in-Furness	Charles Duncan	5,167	48.3	1	Engineers
Belfast North	William Walker	4,616	48.5	2	Carpenters
Birmingham Bordesley	John Bruce Glasier	3,976	33.9	2	ILP
Birmingham East	James Holmes	5,343	47.4	2	Railway Servants
Blackburn	Philip Snowden	10,282	26.8	2	ILP
Bolton	Alfred Henry Gill	10,416	37.1	2	Textile Workers
Bradford West	Fred Jowett	4,957	39.1	1	ILP
Chatham	John Hagan Jenkins	6,692	62.5	1	Shipwrights
Clitheroe	David James Shackleton	12,035	75.9	1	Textile Workers
Croydon	Sidney Stranks	4,007	20.2	3	Stonemasons
Darlington	Isaac Mitchell	4,087	48.3	2	Engineers
Deptford	C. W. Bowerman	6,236	52.2	1	London Compositors
Dewsbury	Ben Turner	2,629	21.2	3	Heavy Woollen LRC
Dundee	Alexander Wilkie	6,833	23.3	2	Shipwrights
Eccles	Ben Tillett	3,985	26.4	3	Dockers
Glasgow Blackfriars and Hutchesontown	George Nicoll Barnes	3,284	39.5	1	Engineers
Glasgow Camlachie	Joseph Burgess	2,568	30.0	3	ILP
Glasgow Govan	John Hill	4,212	29.0	3	Boilermakers
Gorton	John Hodge	8,566	66.4	1	Steel Smelters
Gravesend	James Macpherson	873	16.2	3	Shop Assistants
Great Grimsby	Tom Proctor	2,248	17.8	3	Engineers
Halifax	James Parker	8,937	38.3	2	ILP
Huddersfield	T. Russell Williams	5,813	35.2	2	Huddersfield Trades Council
Ince	Stephen Walsh	8,046	70.2	1	Lancashire & Cheshire Miners
Jarrow	Pete Curran	5,093	38.8	2	Gasworkers
Leeds East	James O'Grady	4,299	66.1	1	Furnishing Trades
Leeds South	Albert E. Fox	4,030	32.6	2	ASLEF
Leicester	Ramsay MacDonald	14,685	39.8	2	ILP
Liverpool Kirkdale	James Conley	3,157	45.7	2	Boilermakers
Liverpool West Toxteth	James Sexton	2,592	43.5	2	Dock Labourers
Manchester North East	John Robert Clynes	5,386	64.6	1	ILP
Manchester South West	George Davy Kelley	4,101	58.8	1	Lithographic Printers
Merthyr Tydfil	Keir Hardie	10,187	32.0	2	ILP
Monmouth Boroughs	James Winstone	1,678	16.5	3	Newport Trades Council
Newcastle-upon-Tyne	Walter Hudson	18,869	31.1	1	Railway Servants
Newton	James Andrew Seddon	6,434	52.2	1	Shop Assistants
Norwich	George Henry Roberts	11,059	37.5	1	Typographers
Portsmouth	William Sanders	8,172	17.6	3	Portsmouth LRC
Preston	John Thomas Macpherson	10,181	31.0	1	Steel Smelters
St Helens	Thomas Glover	6,088	56.6	1	Lancashire & Cheshire Miners
Stockport	George Wardle	7,299	32.4	1	Railway Servants
Stockton-on-Tees	Frank Herbert Rose	1,710	23.1	3	Engineers
Sunderland	Thomas Summerbell	13,430	31.8	2	ILP
Wakefield	Stanton Coit	2,068	36.9	2	ILP
West Ham South	Will Thorne	10,210	67.2	1	Gasworkers & West Ham Trades Council
Westhoughton	William Tyson Wilson	9,262	60.2	1	Carpenters
Wolverhampton West	Thomas Frederick Richards	6,767	50.9	1	Boot and Shoe
Woolwich	Will Crooks	9,026	56.6	1	Woolwich LRC
York	G. H. Stuart	4,573	19.7	4	Postmen

Burgess, Clynes, Coit, Hardie, Jowett, MacDonald, Parker, Snowden, Summerbell and Williams were sponsored by the Independent Labour Party. Gill, Hardie, MacDonald, Parker, Snowden, Summerbell and Wilkie were elected by taking second place in a two-seat constituency.

== See also ==
- Independent Labour Party election results
- Social Democratic Federation election results
