= Richard Squance =

Welsh trade unionist

William John Richard Squance (1 January 1880 – 22 August 1948) was a Welsh trade unionist.

Born in the Landore area of Swansea, Squance found work as a cleaner for the Great Western Railway in 1894, and four years later became a fireman on the railway. He joined the Associated Society of Locomotive Engineers and Firemen (ASLEF), at which time he was based in Aberdare.

In 1907, Squance became an engine driver. He moved to Goodwick to take up the post, and was elected as secretary of the local branch of ASLEF, and he maintained leading roles in local branches as he moved, first to Newport, then to Llanelli. There, he chaired a joint committee of unions during the railway strike of 1911. Increasingly radical, he supported two drivers who refused to move Irish freight during the 1913 Dublin lock-out, organising solidarity action which ultimately led to most of the South Wales railway workers going on strike.

ASLEF set up a GWR Delegation Board in 1915, and Squance was chosen as its first secretary; he was elected to the union's executive the following year, then served as vice-president in 1919/20 and president in 1920/21. In 1920, he was appointed to the National Wages Board, serving for eight years. Following Squance's presidency, he became the union's full-time organising secretary. Active during the UK general strike of 1926, he was imprisoned for his role, but this only increased his prestige in the union, and in 1927 he was promoted to Assistant General Secretary.

Squance was a member of the Labour Party, and was selected as the Prospective Parliamentary Candidate (PPC) for Bassetlaw at the 1935 UK general election. However, ASLEF decided that, if he were elected, he would need to resign his union posts, and Squance decided instead to stand down as PPC.

During the early 1930s, ASLEF's general secretary, John Bromley, suffered from increasingly poor health, and Squance frequently deputised for him. As such, when Bromley retired in 1936, Squance was the natural choice as his successor. He also served on the General Council of the Trades Union Congress from 1936, until his retirement in 1939.

As general secretary, Squance was known as an outspoken anti-fascist, close to the Communist Party of Great Britain. He took a leading role in the People's Convention of 1940/41, and as a result was expelled by the Labour Party.

Trade union offices
Preceded by George Moore	Assistant General Secretary of ASLEF; 1927–1936	Succeeded by William P. Allen
Preceded by John Bromley	General Secretary of ASLEF; 1936–1939	Succeeded by William P. Allen
