= People's Convention =

- People's Convention (United Kingdom), a proposed UK 1940s convention
- People's Convention 2020, a virtual event in the US in 2020
