= Sunter =

Sunter may refer to:

== People ==
- Ercüment Sunter, Turkish basketball player
- Ian Sunter, Scottish-Canadian Canadian football player
- James Sunter (1839–1909), clergyman in South Australia
- Thomas Sunter (1847–1901), British trade unionist

== Places ==
- Sunter Island, Islands on the Great Barrier Reef
- Sunter, Jakarta, an area of North Jakarta, Indonesia.
- Sunter River in Jakarta, Indonesia.
