= Mick Rix =

Mick Rix (born 11 April 1963 in Barnsley, West Riding of Yorkshire) is a British trade unionist and politician.

== Union career ==
Rix is the former General Secretary of ASLEF. He left school at 16 and started work the next day with no qualifications. During his tenure of ASLEF, most members saw their real earnings rise by an average of 6% per annum, and their working week cut to an average of 35 hours, and with many working a four-day week.. He fought for the safety of his members, and the inquiry into the Ladbroke Grove rail crash led by Lord Cullen. He got into trouble with Cullen, when he was quoted in the press stating that leading counsel for Railtrack were lying to cover up their negligence about the cause of the Ladbroke Grove crash. Rix refused to apologise, stating to do so would dishonour the memories of his deceased members.

There is a plaque and a tree outside Euston station which Rix planted to celebrate the memories of those killed in railway disasters. Rix founded the group Take Back the Track, which was successful in turning Railtrack into a not-for-profit publicly owned company in 2001. Rix's defeat in the election for General Secretary of ASLEF by Shaun Brady, a relatively right wing candidate, came as a great surprise to the left wing of the trade union movement. It was widely claimed that those in New Labour and the railway companies had a hand in his defeat. The defeat led to a period of instability in ASLEF culminating in a brawl at a barbecue at the union's London headquarters, which resulted in a number of senior officers being removed from their positions, including Brady.

Rix is currently a National Officer with the GMB Union responsible for relationships with DHL. He also leads the union on all transport and aviation matters, including Yodel, BA, Servisair, Menzies, BMI, the private hire taxi industry and ASDA Distribution.

== Political views ==
Rix joined the Labour Party in February 1980. He created the left-wing FUWL group (Fed Up With Losing) in 1999 after a discussion with Kenny Cameron, Alan Sapper and Ken Gill. The group became more widely known in the public and media as the "awkward squad", after journalist Kevin Maguire coined the term in an article in The Guardian in 2001, in which he also reported that Rix had recently rejoined Labour after a period in the Arthur Scargill's Socialist Labour Party. Rix insisted that the FUWL group had not to ape the left of the old days but had to include a senior officer, senior lay member and a trusted staffer, so that the decisions made at FUWL meetings would go through the various networks of union internal structures. FUWL insisted that it was not the preserve of males, and included the very powerful TUC women's network, along with the editor of the Morning Star. FUWL became a powerful block on the TUC. FUWL basically wrote the policy agenda and in 2001 it ended the right wing dominance at the TUC on policy, and in winning elections to the general council elections in a number of unions. FUWL worked with the Campaign Group of MPs on a whole host of projects.

Rix was responsible for creating the influential Justice for Colombia (JFC) group in late 2000, which helped raise awareness of the deaths and murders of trade unionists taking place in the country. When Rix formed this influential group within the British trade union movement, there were over 250 trade unionists being murdered in Colombia each year. By the time Rix had moved on, this figure had been cut to around 50 to 70 a year, with regular visits and fact finding missions to Colombia taking place by leading trade unionists, journalists, solicitors, politicians, and NGOs. Rix even met the Vice President, later President, Juan Manuel Santos, and berated him over the impunity involved in the murders. Nearly every trade union in the UK plays an active part in JFC.

Rix, along with others, was a founder of the Stop the War Coalition, but later resigned from the organisation. He spoke at most of STWC's large popular demonstrations. He is also active in the Cuba Solidarity Campaign, has visited Cuba many times, has met with many leading Cubans, including Castro, and holds the Workers' Central Union of Cuba (CTC) medal, and the Che Guevara medal, presented to him by the general secretary of the Cuban CTC.

Rix also helped Denis Goldberg, the South African anti-apartheid activist, with his activities with the Woodcraft Folk on numerous occasions, until his return to South Africa. Rix has visited many countries meeting leading trade unionists and politicians.

== Personal life ==
Born in the West Riding of Yorkshire but raised in Leeds, Rix has three children. He owns a Golden Retriever named Che Keir.

Political offices
Preceded by Lew Adams	General Secretary of ASLEF; 1998 - 2003	Succeeded by Shaun Brady
