= Shaun Brady =

British trade unionist

Shaun Brady is a British trade unionist who was general secretary of the Associated Society of Locomotive Engineers and Firemen (ASLEF), the train drivers' trade union in Great Britain.

He was the surprise winner of the election for general secretary in 2003. He had a short and troubled period in office, and was sacked by the union in 2004. In 2008 he won a libel action against his successor Keith Norman, following defamatory articles published in the union's journal and online.

Political offices
Preceded by Mick Rix	General Secretary of ASLEF; 2003–2004	Succeeded by Keith Norman
