= Simon Weller =

Simon Weller (born 1968) is an English trade unionist.

Born in Sussex, Weller undertook an apprenticeship in light engineering, before finding work with British Rail as a traction trainee. He immediately joined the Associated Society of Locomotive Engineers and Firemen (ASLEF), becoming chair of his branch when he was 19 years old, and winning election to its executive committee in 2006.

Weller spent a period working as a fireman on the British Rail-owned and steam-operated Vale of Rheidol Railway. He qualified as a train driver in 1989, and worked out of depots at London Waterloo, Aberystwyth and Westbury-on-Trym before returning to work for Connex in Brighton.

In 2009, Weller began working as ASLEF's full-time national organiser, the post being renamed "assistant general secretary" in 2016. In 2011, he was elected to the General Council of the Trades Union Congress (TUC). That year, he stood to become general secretary of the union, but was narrowly defeated by Mick Whelan. He again stood to become general secretary of the union in 2025, but was defeated by Dave Calfe, taking 2,951 votes to Calfe's 4,556. In 2026, he was elected as President of the TUC, stating that he would focus on the provision of decent jobs for young people.

Trade union offices
Preceded by Andy Reed	National Organiser / Assistant General Secretary of ASLEF; 2009–present	Succeeded by Incumbent
Preceded by Steve Gillan	President of the Trades Union Congress; 2026–present	Succeeded by Incumbent
