= Amalgamated Society of Enginemen, Cranemen and Firemen =

Former trade union of the United Kingdom

- Merged into: British Steel Smelters' Association
- Founded: 1889
- Dissolved: 1912
- Headquarters: 18 Parliament Street, Stockton-on-Tees
- Location: United Kingdom
- Members: 4,056 (1906)
- Affiliations: TUC

The Amalgamated Society of Enginemen, Cranemen and Firemen was a trade union in the United Kingdom. It represented stationary engine drivers and cranemen in a wide variety of industries.

The union was founded in 1889, and within three years it had a membership of nearly 4,000 workers. However, it split in 1893, with nearly 1,000 members leaving to form the Northern United Enginemen's Association, which eventually joined the rival National Amalgamated Union of Enginemen, Firemen, Mechanics, Motormen and Electrical Workers. The remaining members renamed the union as the National Amalgamated Society of Enginemen, Cranemen, Boilermen and Firemen, and slowly rebuilt its membership, which peaked at 4,056 in 1906.

The union was based in North East England, but also had a significant membership in Scotland, particularly in the steel industry, where it appointed representatives to a board of conciliation. In England, it instead reached agreement to link its members' wages to those negotiated by the Amalgamated Society of Engineers.

The union tried to broaden its membership, in 1906 becoming the National Amalgamated Society of Enginemen, Cranemen, Boilermen, Firemen and Electrical Workers, but in 1912 decided to merge into the British Steel Smelters, Mill, Iron, Tinplate and Kindred Trades Association.

== General Secretaries ==
Thomas Dobson
1907: John Baker
