= Ivor Gregory =

Welsh trade unionist and political activist

Ivor Gregory (1880–1936) was a Welsh trade unionist and political activist.

Born in Swansea, Gregory left school before he was thirteen and began working at a tinplate works. This was illegal, and he later stated that he was hidden whenever a factory inspector visited. He later worked as a coal miner, then became a cleaner for the Great Western Railway, and later as a driver. He joined the Associated Society of Locomotive Engineers and Firemen (ASLEF), but was discharged from his job in 1907. He believed that he had been victimised for his union activities, but his claim for reinstatement failed, and the union instead found him work as a clerk at its head office.

Gregory proved successful as a clerk, and 1913 was elected as a full-time organiser for ASLEF, still based at head office, but travelling around the country. In 1914, the union's general secretary died, and Gregory stood in the election to replace him. He took third place, with 3,641 votes, behind Jack Bromley with 5,235 votes, and George Moore with 4,249 votes.

Gregory was a socialist and was active in the Labour Party. The union decided to sponsor three Labour candidates at the 1918 United Kingdom general election, one being Bromley, and Gregory topped a poll to select the other two. He stood in Nuneaton, and took 25.8% of the vote, and second place. He supported the October Revolution, and spoke on behalf of the Hands Off Russia movement.

Gregory spent much of 1919 organising the union in Ireland, and was successful in establishing five branches, with a total of about 250 members. He remained in post as an organising secretary until his death in 1936.
