= Keith Norman =

British trade union leader

Keith Norman was general secretary of the Associated Society of Locomotive Engineers and Firemen (ASLEF), the train drivers' trade union in Great Britain, from 2004 to 2011. He comes from Wales, and is a supporter of the Labour Party.

Political offices
Preceded by Shaun Brady	General Secretary of ASLEF; 2004–2011	Succeeded by Mick Whelan
