= Dave Calfe =

Dave Calfe is a British trade union leader.

Born in Bounds Green in London, Calfe began working for British Rail in 1985. He trained as a driver while based at a depot in West London. He later worked for Eurostar, Virgin Trains and Avanti West Coast. He joined ASLEF and served on its executive committee for 20 years, serving as president of the union from 2019. While in post, he jointly led a major industrial dispute.

In 2025, Calfe stood to become general secretary of the union, defeating Simon Weller to win the post. On 12 December 2025, he drove his final train, from Birmingham New Street to London Euston, where he was met by supportive rail workers. As leader of the union, he planned to broadly continue the approach of his predecessor, Mick Whelan, while campaigning to reduce the minimum age to train as a driver to 18, in an attempt to attract people from under-represented demographics.

Trade union offices
Preceded by Tosh McDonald	President of ASLEF; 2019–2025	Succeeded by Andy Hudd
Preceded by Mick Whelan	General Secretary of ASLEF; 2026–present	Succeeded by Incumbent
