= Mick Whelan =

British union leader

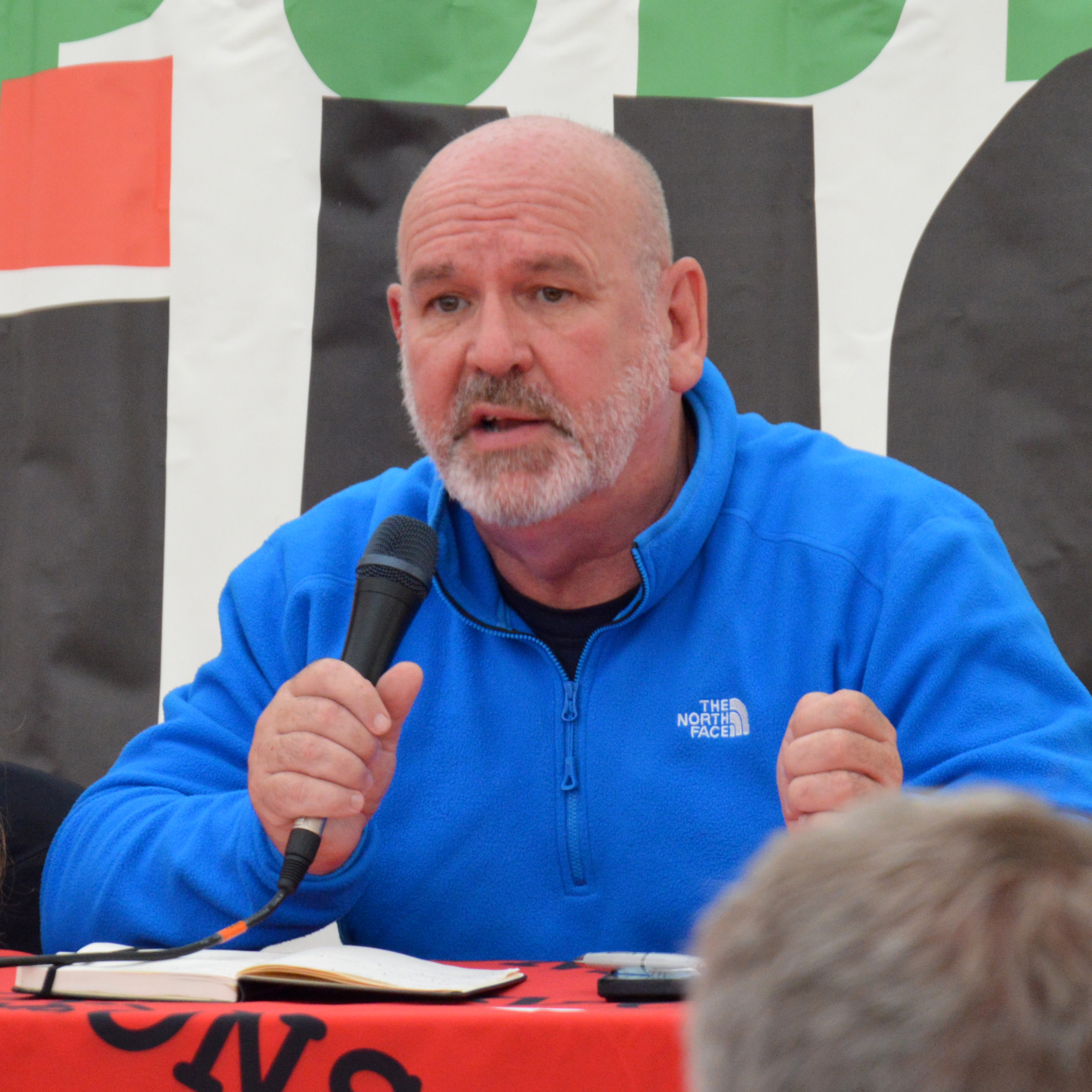
Mick Whelan speaking at Tolpuddle Martyrs' Festival in 2023

John Michael Whelan (born 1960) was the 18th General Secretary of the British trade union ASLEF, a position he held from 2011 to 2026.

== Early life ==
Whelan was born in Paddington to Irish parents and grew up in North West London. His mother worked in a sweet shop at Euston station and his father was a bricklayer. Whelan credited his father with politicising him, although both his parents had left-wing views: his father was a member of the Socialist Workers Party whilst he described his mother's beliefs as "hard Labour". He passed his eleven-plus and attended London Oratory School: he planned to attend university after leaving school, however he entered employment instead after his father suffered injuries from a fall from some scaffolding and was unable to continue working.

== Career ==
He began working in the rail industry in 1984, becoming a train driver. Previously he had been a bank clerk.

=== ASLEF ===
Whelan was elected General Secretary of ASLEF on 11 October 2011, when he received 3683 votes compared to 3458 for Simon Weller. Previously he had been Midlands District Organiser (ASLEF District 6) for the union. In the first ballot on 19 September 2011 he received 3,284 votes, against 3,115 for Simon Weller. He became General Secretary on 5 December 2011.

He is also Editor of Aslef Journal (a nominal position for the General Secretary), published by TU ink.

Whelan supports Brexit as he believes that "the EU has become a rich man’s club which offers plenty for the boss class – but very little for the ordinary hard-working men and women trying to earn a living".

Whelan is a prominent supporter of the Ukraine Solidarity Campaign and highlighted this when rejecting claims by a UK government minister that ASLEF was failing to show solidarity with Ukrainians by striking during Eurovision 2023, which was hosted by the UK on behalf of Ukraine.

== Personal life ==
Whelan is a supporter of Chelsea football club.

He is married to Lorraine Phelan MBE, the Chief Biomedical Scientist for special haematology at St Mary's Hospital, London. They live at a house in Wembley and have two boys including a son born in 1995.

Political offices
Preceded by Keith Norman	General Secretary of ASLEF; 2011-2025	Succeeded by Dave Calfe
