= William P. Allen (trade unionist) =

British trade unionist

William Philip Allen CBE (11 November 1888 – 4 May 1958) was a British trade unionist.

Born in Islington, Allen worked for the Great Northern Railway from 1907, initially as an engine cleaner. He became active in the Associated Society of Locomotive Engineers and Firemen (ASLEF), and served as its Hornsey branch secretary and on the national executive before winning election as the union's president in 1930, being re-elected in 1932 and 1933.

After his final term as president, Allen was employed as the union's organising secretary. He was promoted to assistant general secretary in 1936 before, in 1940, becoming general secretary. At the same time, he was elected to the General Council of the Trades Union Congress. He served in the post for seven years, and was made a Commander of the Order of the British Empire in the 1947 New Year Honours.

Later in 1947, Allen resigned all his trade union positions to take up a position on British Transport Commission (BTC)'s new Railway Executive, acting as chief negotiator with the railway trade unions. While in this post, an LNER Peppercorn Class A1 locomotive was named in his honour. In 1953, he became the BTC's COE and Staff, the role later renamed Manpower Adviser, retaining his negotiation responsibilities. He retired in 1958, shortly before his death at age 69.
