= Arthur Mason (trade unionist) =

British trade unionist and political activist

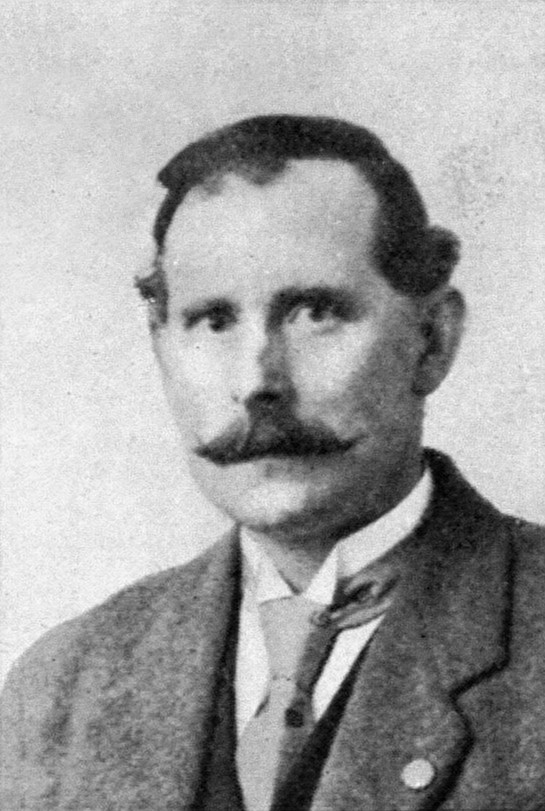

Arthur Mason (1875 or 1876 – 17 March 1933) was a British trade unionist and political activist.

Mason joined the Great Central Railway in 1893, based in Gorton, and he became an engine driver when he was 27 years old. He joined the Associated Society of Locomotive Engineers and Firemen (ASLEF), and began working full-time for the union in 1905. In 1916, he became Organising Secretary of the union's Manchester District.

Mason was a supporter of the Labour Party, and in 1918 the union sponsored him as a candidate in Chester. He took 15.7% of the vote, and third place. Thereafter, he devoted himself to union work, but he became ill in 1932 and was offered early retirement in February 1933. He died in March, before he could take up the offer.
