= People's Convention (United Kingdom) =

The People's Convention was a conference that was proposed by the Communist Party of Great Britain in 1940–1941. Its advocates attempted to persuade Labour Party and trade union members that the current government was solely for the rich and was dominated by those who through appeasement had "caused" the Second World War, who opposed the Soviet Union, and who were profiteering from the war. Its literature did not, however, explicitly state that it was communist-backed.

The Convention was the initiative of the Hammersmith Trades Council and Labour Party, and Denis Nowell Pritt, Member of Parliament for Hammersmith North, who had both been expelled from the Labour Party in 1940. It was backed by Palme Dutt, Robin Page Arnot, Harry Pollitt, and Willie Gallacher, all well-known communists. Many of the founder members were members of the People's Vigilance Committee, which had been formed by communists expelled from the Labour Party. A few supporters, such as Richard Squance, still held membership of the Labour Party, but were expelled for participating. A convention did take place in Manchester in February 1941 to find a people's government and peace.

The Convention was vigorously opposed by the Labour Party and the Trades Union Congress, and failed to take off; eventually it was disowned by the Communist Party of Great Britain itself in January 1942.

There were also proposals for regional People's Conventions, including a Midlands Convention and a Scottish Convention.
