= John Baker (Labour politician) =

British trade unionist and politician

John Baker (8 April 1867 – 3 May 1939) was a British trade unionist and Labour Party politician.

Born in Stockton-on-Tees, Yorkshire, he was the son of a bricklayer, also named John Baker. He held various jobs in iron foundries, steelworks, brickyards and engineering works prior to becoming a locomotive driver. In 1898 he became national organiser of the National Amalgamated Society of Enginemen, Cranemen, Boilermen, Firemen and Electrical Workers, later rising to be general secretary in 1907. From 1906–1910 he was a member of Stockton-on-Tees Borough Council.

During the First World War he served on munition tribunals and a number of government committees: the Ship Yard Labour Advisory Committee; the Labour Advisory Committee to the Ministry of Munitions and the Food Committee of the Ministry of Munitions.

An early member of the Labour Party, Baker was subsequently selected to contest parliamentary elections on behalf of the party. In 1918 he stood unsuccessfully at Kidderminster, and also failed to be elected at Wolverhampton Bilston in 1922 and 1923. He was finally elected as Bilston's member of parliament at his third attempt in the 1924 general election. By this time he was an assistant secretary at the Iron and Steel Trades Confederation. He held the seat at the 1929 election, but was unseated in 1931 following a split in the Labour Party and the formation of a National Government.

Baker was a writer on industrial economics and sat on Arthur Balfour's Committee on Industry and Trade.

By the time of his death, aged 72, in the North Middlesex Hospital he was living in East Finchley.

Parliament of the United Kingdom
Preceded by Charles Howard-Bury	Member of Parliament for Wolverhampton, Bilston; 1924–1931	Succeeded by Geoffrey Peto
Trade union offices
Preceded by Thomas Dobson	General Secretary of the National Amalgamated Society of Enginemen, Cranemen, Boilermen, Firemen and Electrical Workers; 1907–1912	Succeeded by Position abolished
