= Thomas Sunter =

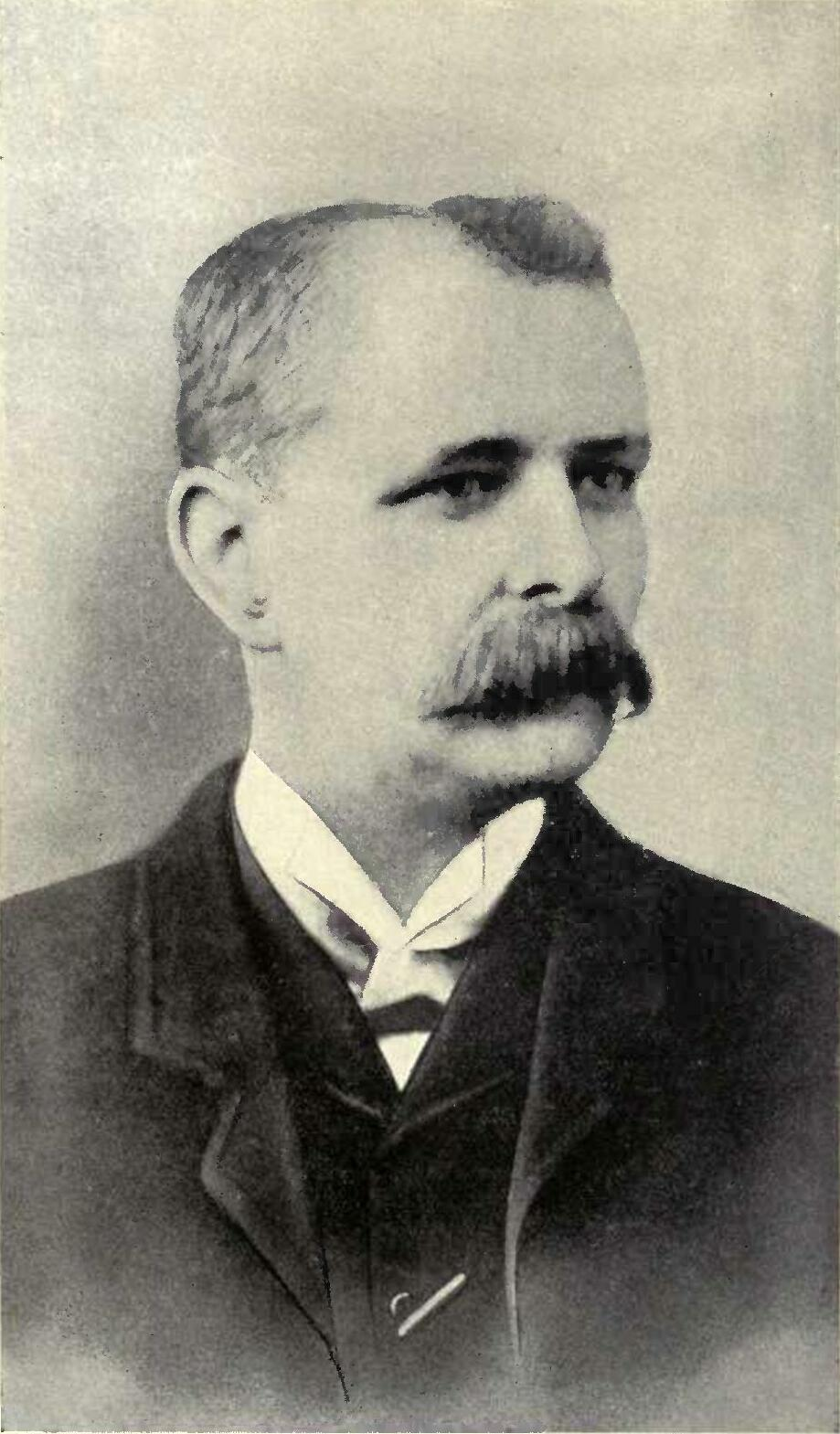
- Born: 30 April 1847
- Died: 20 September 1901 (aged 54)
- Resting place: Beeston Hill
- Occupation: Trade unionist, train driver

Thomas G. Sunter (30 April 1847 – 20 September 1901) was a British trade unionist.

Born in the Halton area of Leeds, Sunter began working for the Midland Railway in 1864, as a cleaner. He was steadily promoted until he became an express train driver, a job he undertook for sixteen years.

Sunter was one of the first members of the Associated Society of Locomotive Engineers and Firemen (ASLEF), which was initially based in Leeds. He served on the union's first executive committee, which was led by Joseph Brooke, its part-time secretary. Brooke proved ineffective, and in 1885 the executive voted to remove him from office. An election to the post was held, Sunter taking on Brooke, and Sunter won by a 6-to-1 majority.

Under Sunter's leadership, ASLEF's membership rose from 1,000 to over 10,000. In 1901, he became ill, but was able to attend meetings and expected to recover. However, he died suddenly, aged 54, on 21 September and was buried at Beeston Hill Cemetery, Leeds, three days later.

In 1881, his address was given as 91, Bewerley Street, Beestan Road, Leeds.

Trade union offices
Preceded by Joseph Brooke	General Secretary of ASLEF; 1885–1901	Succeeded by Albert E. Fox
