= British Steel Smelters' Association =

Former trade union of the United Kingdom

- British Steel Smelters, Mill, Iron, Tinplate and Kindred Trades Association
- Merged into: Iron and Steel Trades Confederation
- Founded: 1885
- Dissolved: 1917
- Headquarters: Ormond Mansions, Great Ormond Street, London
- Location: United Kingdom
- Members: 39,507 (1917)
- Key people: John Hodge (Gen Sec)
- Affiliations: TUC, Labour

The British Steel Smelters' Association (BSSA) was a trade union representing steel smelters and workers in related trades in Britain.

== History ==
The union was founded in after a strike at the David Colville and Sons Works in Motherwell in 1885. This succeeded in preventing third-hand melters from being laid off, and one of them, John Hodge became the secretary of the new union, founded in 1886. Although its founders were all based in Scotland, it rapidly spread into England and Wales, having 750 members by 1888, and 2,700 in 1890. In 1899, its name was lengthened to the British Steel Smelters, Mill, Iron, Tinplate and Kindred Trades Association, as it attempted to recruit other metalworkers. However, this faced strong opposition from other unions in the industry, including the National Blastfurnacemen's Federation, the Associated Iron and Steel Workers of Great Britain, and the Tin and Sheet Millmen's Association. A few smaller unions merged into the BSSA, including the Amalgamated Society of Enginemen, Cranemen and Firemen, in 1912.

Ongoing disputes did not prevent the BSSA from expanding to 39,507 members by 1917, but a series of demarcation disputes between these unions led several of them to form the Iron and Steel Trades Confederation that year.

== General Secretaries ==
1886: John Hodge

== Assistant General Secretaries ==
1900: J. T. Macpherson
1906: Arthur Pugh
