= John Bromley (politician) =

English Labour Party politician

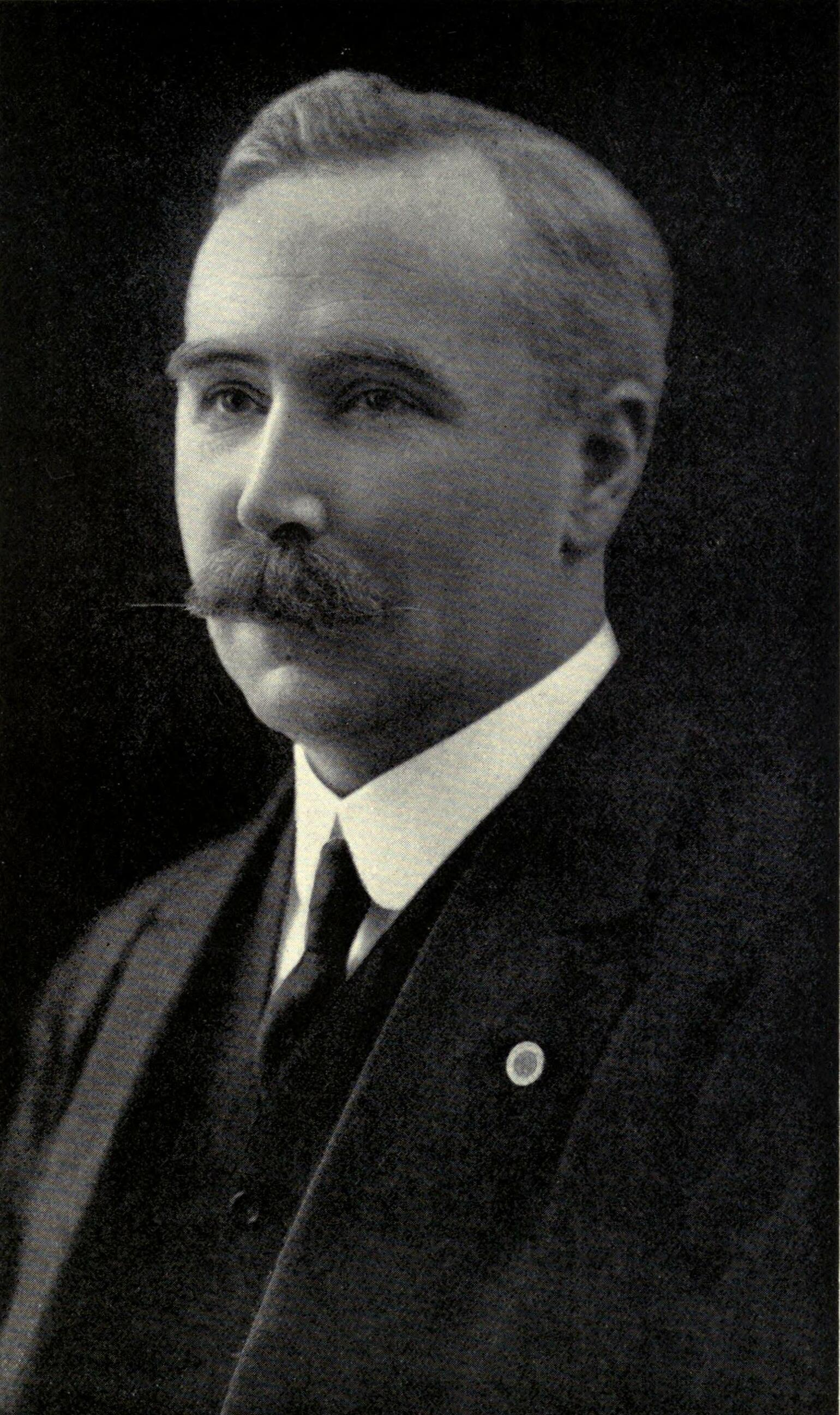
- Born: 16 July 1876
- Died: 7 September 1945 (aged 69)
- Occupation: Politician, trade unionist
- Position held: member of the 35th Parliament of the United Kingdom (1929–1931), member of the 34th Parliament of the United Kingdom (1924–1929)

John Bromley (16 July 1876 – 7 September 1945) was an English Labour Party politician who served as Member of Parliament (MP) for Barrow-in-Furness from 1924 to 1931, and a trade union leader.

== Early life and railway career ==
He was born at Haston Grove, Hadnall, Shropshire, son of Charles Alfred Bromley, a dyer, and his wife Martha Helen nee Wellings, and baptised at Hadnall on 6 August 1876.

He was educated at elementary schools until the age of twelve (1888), when he began working successively as a country post boy, a chemist's errand boy, and assistant on W.H. Smith & Sons' bookstall at Shrewsbury railway station. At age fourteen (1890) he began working for the Great Western Railway (GWR) as an engine cleaner at Shrewsbury. In 1892 he became an assistant fireman, and a regular fireman in 1896. He was a registered train driver in the GWR until 1905.

== Trade union career ==
Becoming a fireman qualified him to join his trade union, the Associated Society of Locomotive Engineers and Firemen (ASLEF). He became active in union branches in Shrewsbury and, as he moved employment in the GWR, at Worcester and Southall, Middlesex. In 1903 he joined the GWR locomotivemen's negotiating committee and in 1908 became ASLEF representative on the sectional conciliation board. In 1909 he became its organiser in the North of England, based in Manchester. In succession to Albert E. Fox, he was elected with clear majority to national general secretary in October 1914.

When the railway companies were brought under government control during the First World War, he was a railway unions representative on the Advisory Committee to the Ministry of Transport. During the same period, as his union's head he campaigned for the interests of its trades against the claims of rival railway unions and secured an agreement in December 1918 for a standard eight-hour day for locomotive footplatemen.

In 1919 he obtained a full standardisation of locomotivemen's wages and service conditions. By that year the union's membership had grown from 32,200 in 1913 to 57,184. In January 1924 he led a nine-day national locomotivemen's strike against worsening working conditions.

He was a founder member of the General Council of the Trades Union Congress (TUC) in 1921. He attended the TUC's first delegation to visit the Soviet Union in 1924. He served as President from 1932 to 1933 and retired as ASLEF general secretary in 1936.

== Parliamentary service ==
An early member of the Independent Labour Party, he unsuccessfully contested the Leeds North East constituency at the 1918 general election. He switched to Barrow-in-Furness for the 1922 election, losing by 1,927 votes. He cut the Conservative majority to 420 votes at the 1923 election and finally won at the 1924 general election, with a majority of 710. He increased his majority in 1929, and retired from the House of Commons at the 1931 general election.

== Personal and later life ==
Bromley married in Shrewsbury, on 6 March 1901, Ann Hall (1880–1953). After his retirement from union leadership in 1936 they moved to Cornwall where he died of a cerebral haemorrhage at his home, Mon Repos, Borras Cross, Liskeard, aged sixty-nine. He was cremated at Efford Crematorium, Plymouth, Devon.

Parliament of the United Kingdom
Preceded by Daniel Somerville	Member of Parliament for Barrow-in-Furness; 1924 – 1931	Succeeded by Jonah Walker-Smith
Trade union offices
Preceded by Albert E. Fox	General Secretary of ASLEF; 1914 – 1936	Succeeded by Richard Squance
Preceded by A. A. Purcell and Ben Smith	Trades Union Congress representative to the American Federation of Labour; 1926; With: George Hicks	Succeeded by Arthur Pugh and Will Sherwood
Preceded by Arthur Hayday	President of the Trades Union Congress; 1932	Succeeded by Alexander Walkden
