= Albert E. Fox =

British trade unionist and politician

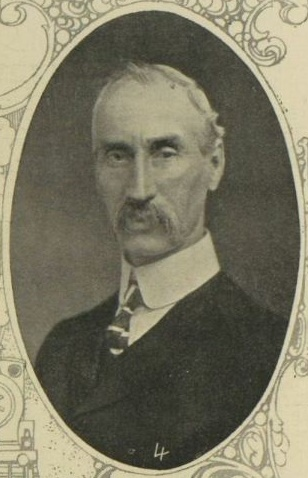
- Fox in 1911
- Born: c. 1858; Aldershot, Hampshire, England
- Died: 22 March 1914; Leeds, Yorkshire, England
- Occupations: trade unionist, politician

Albert E. Fox (1858 – 22 March 1914) was a UK trade unionist and Labour Representation Committee politician.

== Trade unionist ==
Fox joined the Associated Society of Locomotive Engineers and Firemen in 1886 and for a number of years was ASLEF Branch Secretary at Mexborough, Yorkshire. By 1897 ASLEF's Yorkshire district had elected Fox to the union's Executive Committee and in April 1900 the executive committee elected Fox as its president. In September 1901 ASLEF's general secretary, Thomas Sunter, died in office and in December Fox was one of 10 candidates in the ballot to succeed him.

ASLEF's Rules stated, "The General Secretary shall be elected by the votes of the majority of the whole of the members of the Society". However, only 4,369 of ASLEF's 10,502 members (41.6%) had voted and Fox won only 42.6% of the votes that had been cast. The runner-up was an EC member and former organising secretary, Harry Parfitt, with 1,536 votes. After the votes were counted on 8 December an EC member proposed a run-off election between Fox and Parfitt but the EC voted to take legal advice. On 9 December the EC voted to declare Fox elected as general secretary and the assistant general secretary, Henry Shuttleworth, quickly issued a circular to all branches to that effect. Parfitt challenged the decision and issued his own circular to branches asserting the members' right to demand a run-off ballot, but none was held and Fox took office without further challenge.

Fox supported ASLEF's continuation as an independent craft union. In 1900 ASLEF had rejected a proposal from the industrial union for UK railway workers, the Amalgamated Society of Railway Servants, that ASLEF and the ASRS should merge. Instead ASLEF proposed a Federation, which was enacted in 1903. Fox later reiterated his preference for Federation under the slogan "Organise your grade, Federate your industry". Fox claimed that the employees' victory in the UK's first national railway strike, which was held in 1911 by four railway unions acting jointly, proved there was no need for merger, whereas the ASRS claimed the same victory proved that "one railway union will prove to be most beneficial for all railwaymen".

== Political candidate ==
In 1903 ASLEF affiliated to the Labour Representation Committee and in the 1906 General Election Fox was the LRC candidate for Leeds South. He polled 4,030 votes, losing to the Liberal incumbent Sir John Lawson Walton, and in 1921 ASLEF's official historian blamed "a strong A.S.R.S. section impairing his chances" for Fox's defeat.

Acrimony between ASLEF and the ASRS caused the Federation to collapse in 1906–07 and spilled over into the Leeds LRC. In January 1908 Lawson Walton died and in the ensuing Leeds South by-election Fox was again the LRC candidate. When the Liberal candidate William Middlebrook won, Fox blamed opponents for exploiting the division between railway unions.

== Illness and death ==
By 1910 Fox found himself to be seriously ill but he persisted with his duties. He led ASLEF through the 1911 national railway strike but by 1912 he was very pale and clearly unwell. After ASLEF's 1912 Conference his condition worsened, and his doctor prescribed a period of bed rest. He attended the 1913 Conference, but delegates voted him a salary increase and three months' leave of absence as he had not taken a holiday since 1910.

In 1913 Fox's younger son Charles suffered a painful illness and died in October, and Fox's own condition worsened in December. Because of his illness, in the early part of 1914 there were only two days on which Fox managed to come to work. He died on Sunday 22 March 1914.

== Sources ==
- McKillop, Norman (1950). The Lighted Flame; a History of the Associated Society of Locomotive Engineers and Firemen. London & Edinburgh: Thomas Nelson & Sons Ltd.
- Raynes (1921), Engines and Men, Goodall & Suddick, Wikidata Q115680227

Trade union offices
Preceded by Thomas Sunter	General Secretary of ASLEF; 1901–1914	Succeeded by Jack Bromley
