= ASLEF =

British trade union

- Associated Society of Locomotive Engineers and Firemen
- Founded: 1880; 146 years ago
- Headquarters: 77 St John Street, London
- Members: ▲25,206 (2024)
- General Secretary: Dave Calfe
- Affiliations: TUC; STUC; ITF; ETF; Labour Party
- Website: aslef.org.uk

The Associated Society of Locomotive Engineers and Firemen (ASLEF) is a British trade union representing drivers of trains including services such as the London Underground (Tube). It is part of the International Transport Workers' Federation and the European Transport Workers' Federation. At the end of 2019 ASLEF had 24,479 members. Mick Whelan was its General Secretary between 2011-2026, before being replaced by Dave Calfe who was elected in November 2025.

== History ==
=== Foundation ===
In 1865, North Eastern Railway footplatemen founded a union called the Engine Drivers' and Firemen's Society. It unsuccessfully attempted strike action, as a result of which the NER was able to break up the Society.

In 1872, an industrial union, the Amalgamated Society of Railway Servants, was founded with the support of the Liberal MP Michael Bass. In 1872, the ASRS reported having 17,247 members, but by 1882, this had declined to only 6,321.

By the end of the 1870s, many UK railway companies had increased the working week from 60 to 66 hours, a 12-hour working day was common and wages had been reduced. The Great Western Railway had not increased wages since 1867, had increased the working day from 10 to 12 hours in 1878 and then reduced wages for all but the most junior drivers and firemen in 1879. In 1879, almost 2,000 GWR locomotive drivers and firemen signed an ASRS petition to the GWR Board of Directors requesting a restoration of the 1867 conditions of service and rates of pay. The GWR reacted by refusing to meet the ASRS representatives and dismissing several of the petitioners from their jobs.

As a result of this defeat, in 1879, drivers and firemen from Griffithstown, Pontypool, South Wales, started to organise to form a craft union separate from the ASRS. At the time there were similar moves in parts of England towards founding an enginemen's union. A large number of drivers and firemen met in Birmingham on 9 December 1879 and resolved to form a National Society of Drivers and Firemen. There was a similar move by Manchester, Sheffield and Lincolnshire Railway drivers and firemen at Sheffield, whom the Pontypool group called "the first founders of the Society". The Sheffield branch opened on 7 February 1880 with William Ullyott, one of its leaders, as the first member. Pontypool branch followed on 15 February, led by Charles H. Perry, one of the drivers who had unsuccessfully petitioned the GWR board the previous year. ASLEF officially records Perry as its founder. In the remainder of 1880 ASLEF opened branches at Tondu, Liverpool and Leeds (April), Neath (May), Bradford (June), and Carnforth (July).

ASLEF adopted and published its first Rule Book in 1881. Its title page reproduced a stanza of Robert Burns' "Man was made to mourn: A Dirge":

If I'm yon haughty lordling's slave
By Nature's law designed,
Why was an independent wish
E'er planted in my mind?
If not, why am I subject to
His cruelty or scorn?
Or why has man the will and pow'r
To make his fellow mourn?

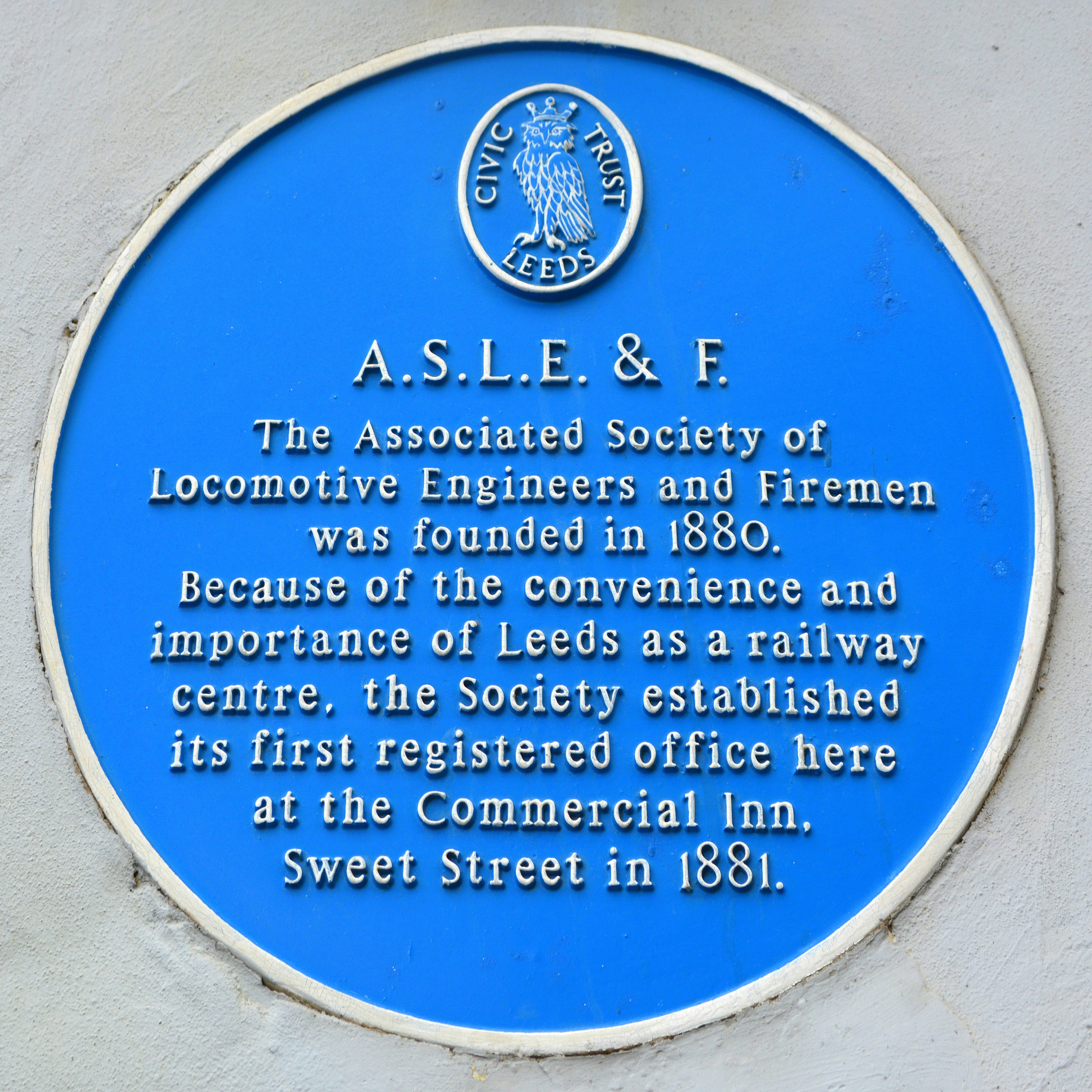
Blue plaque on the Commercial Inn, Holbeck

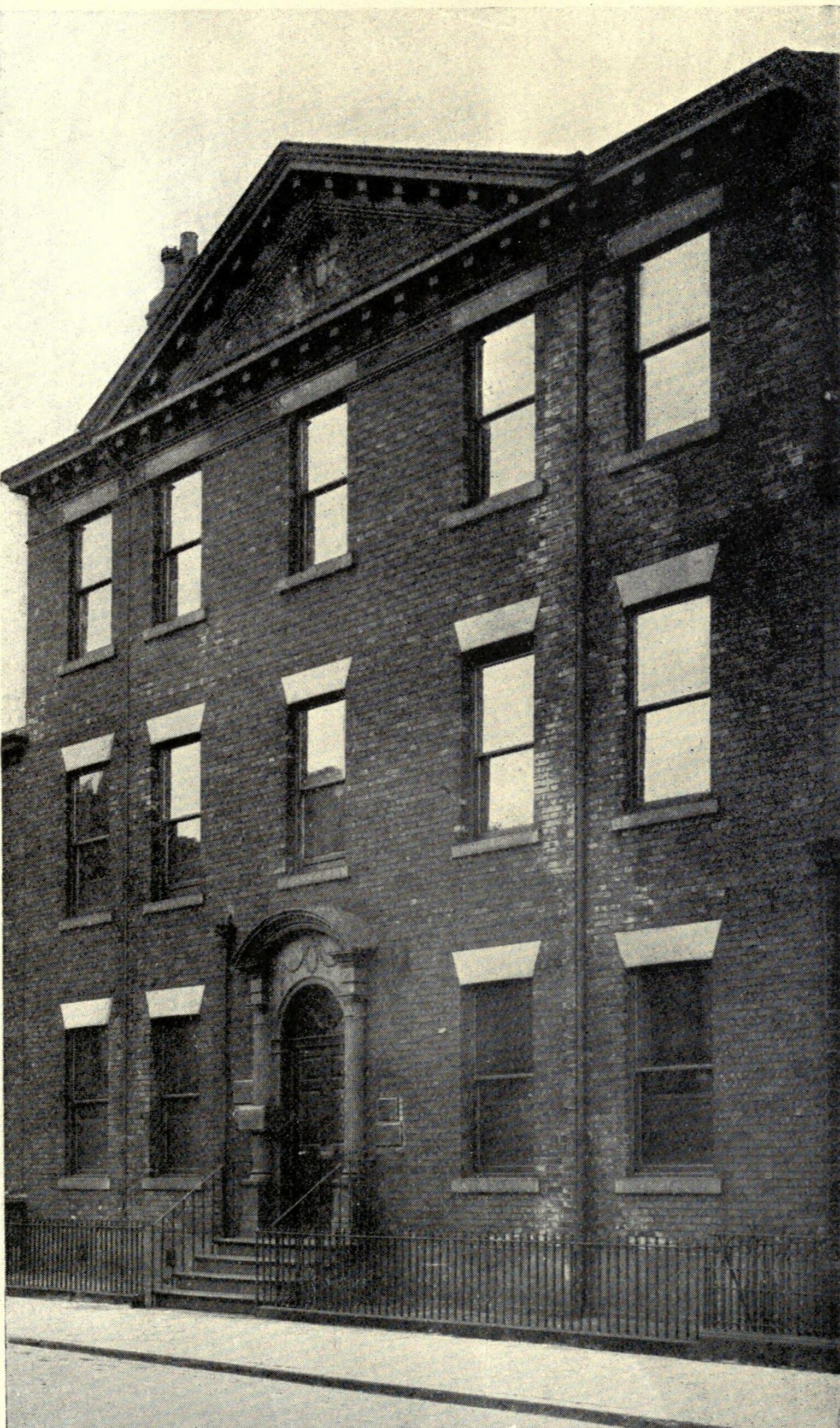
The union's Head Office, 8, Park Square, Leeds, in 1920

For economy's sake, ASLEF initially chose to be managed by its Leeds branch, as a result of which its first head office was at the Commercial Inn, Sweet Street, Holbeck. It moved to 17 Mill Hill Chambers, Leeds, in 1885, and again to 8 Park Square, Leeds, in 1904. In 1921, it moved to London by buying a house at 9 Arkwright Road, Hampstead, from the family of the late Sir Joseph Beecham, Bt. For a period in the second half of the 20th century ASLEF also owned the next-door house at 7 Arkwright Road.

=== Relations with industrial unionism ===
In the 1880s ASLEF's foundation as a craft union exclusively for one defined part of the railway workforce went against the industrial unionist trend of the New Unionism movement. In 1880, the ASRS denounced the enginemen's decision as "very selfish" and "an act of folly" and declared "the sooner our friends the enginemen... give up the idea of forming a separate Association the better".

ASLEF succeeded in getting more locomotive drivers and firemen to join a trade union, but it has never succeeded in recruiting all drivers or firemen. In 1900, the ASRS wanted amalgamation, but ASLEF proposed federation with the drivers and firemen of the ASRS. A Scheme of Federation was drafted and ASLEF's triennial conference adopted it in 1903. There were joint meetings of the Executive Committees of the two unions until 1906 when relations broke down.

In 1907, David Lloyd George, president of the Board of Trade, brought about a conciliation board for the railway industry with representatives of both the companies and their workforces. ASLEF initially welcomed the new board, but later grew dissatisfied with its slow operation and dubbed it a "confiscation" board. In August 1911, the ASRS, ASLEF, the United Pointsmen's and Signalmen's Society (founded 1880) and the General Railway Workers' Union (founded 1889) jointly called the United Kingdom's first national rail strike. In only two days it succeeded in forcing the Liberal Government to set up a Royal Commission to examine the workings of the 1907 conciliation board.

ASLEF's then General Secretary, Albert E. Fox, claimed that the 1911 victory showed there was no need to amalgamate with the ASRS and that Federation should be restored. Fox drafted a new federation scheme, but in October 1911, the ASRS rejected "the further extension of sectionalism contained therein" and expressed the opinion that the success of the national strike indicated "that one railway union will prove to be most beneficial for all railwaymen". In 1913, the ASRS, GRWU and UPSS duly merged to form the National Union of Railwaymen. ASLEF stayed out of the new industrial union and held to the slogan "organise your trade, federate your industry" coined by Fox.

During the First World War the cost of living increased rapidly. From July 1914 to September 1915, for example, food prices rose 37%. For the duration of the war, the government was in control of the railways. Wages were increased, but at a slower rate than the rise in the cost of living. NUR and ASLEF responded jointly, and forced the Board of Trade to award wage increases in September 1916 and April 1917. In March 1919, the coalition government indicated that it intended to review the War Wage, with a view to reducing it at the end of the year. The NUR and ASLEF started a second national railway strike in September 1919, which in nine days won both a change in pay policy and the reduction of the working day to eight hours.

After 1919, control of the railways was returned to the companies, and in 1923, the Railways Act 1921 merged about 120 of Great Britain's railways into four large regional companies. In December 1923, the new companies presented proposals that included some reductions in locomotive men's pay and conditions. Negotiations broke down and ASLEF ordered its members to strike, but the NUR instructed its members – including locomotivemen – to stay at work. After another nine-day strike, ASLEF was victorious, but the disagreement between ASLEF and the NUR left deep division.

Eventually ASLEF and the NUR agreed a new Railway Union Federation in 1982, but this failed to end mutual suspicion. About the time that the NUR and National Union of Seamen merged in 1990 to form the RMT the federation broke down, and neither federation nor merger has been negotiated since.

=== Major industrial disputes ===
ASLEF has taken part in several national rail strikes. The 1911 joint strike with the ASRS, 1919 joint strike with the NUR and 1924 strike of ASLEF without the NUR are described above. ASLEF and the NUR were prominent participants in the 1926 general strike that unsuccessfully sought to prevent British coal companies from reducing mineworkers' pay and conditions.

In 1955, ASLEF struck against British Railways for seventeen days in a pay dispute. In 1982, both ASLEF and the NUR opposed BR proposals for flexible rostering but they failed to co-ordinate strike action. First the NUR struck against BR and ASLEF instructed its members to cross NUR picket lines. Then after the end of the NUR's dispute, ASLEF held its own strike against BR.

There have also been local disputes with individual railway operators such as those with London Underground in 1982, 1989 and 1996.

=== Since railway privatisation ===
ASLEF aims to increase basic pay so the "overtime culture" is reduced or eliminated, in the hope that more jobs will be created to cover the work that is not covered by overtime. The health and safety issues related to overtime and fatigue would also be minimised.

=== Membership ===
The record of membership numbers is not complete for all years of the society's history. However, some key years will give an indication of ASLEF's growth in its first seven decades.

- 1881: 651
- 1889: 5,039
- 1892: 6,710
- 1894: 7,524
- 1901: 10,502
- 1908: 19,800
- 1910: 19,800
- 1913: 32,200
- 1916: 34,039
- 1918: 39,940
- 1919: 57,184
- 1937: 53,857
- 1939: 53,325
- 1946: 71,842
- 2011: 18,500+
- 2014: 20,364
- 2017: 21,791

== Political affiliation ==
ASLEF is affiliated to the Labour Party.

Labour was founded in 1900 as the Labour Representation Committee, and in 1903, ASLEF voted to affiliate to it. In the 1906 general election, ASLEF General Secretary Albert Fox was the LRC candidate for Leeds South, where he polled 4,030 votes. Fox lost to the Liberal incumbent John Lawson Walton, but Lawson Walton died in January 1908 causing a by-election. Fox contested Leeds South a second time, but lost to the new Liberal candidate William Middlebrook.

In June 2015, ASLEF endorsed Jeremy Corbyn's campaign in the Labour Party leadership election. Aslef said Corbyn has the "character, vision and policies" needed to win back power for the party. General secretary Mick Whelan said: "Jeremy understands what Labour has to do to win back the hearts, the minds and the votes of ordinary working people in Britain."

=== Election results ===
The union sponsored a Labour Party candidate in many Parliamentary elections, from 1906 until 1992. Several of its candidates were elected as Members of Parliament.

Election	Constituency	Candidate	Votes	Percentage	Position
1906 general election	Leeds South	Albert E. Fox	4,030	32.6	2
1908 by-election	Leeds South	Albert E. Fox	2,451	19.4	3
1918 general election	Chester	Arthur Mason	2,799	15.7	3
1918 general election	Leeds North East	John Bromley	4,450	24.5	2
1918 general election	Nuneaton	Ivor Gregory	6,269	25.8	2
1922 general election	Barrow-in-Furness	John Bromley	14,551	46.9	2
1923 general election	Barrow-in-Furness	John Bromley	13,576	46.0	2
1924 general election	Barrow-in-Furness	John Bromley	15,512	51.2	1
1929 general election	Barrow-in-Furness	John Bromley	19,798	56.0	1
1935 general election	Newcastle upon Tyne Central	Walter Monslow	10,871	40.7	2
1945 general election	Birkenhead West	Percy Collick	15,568	57.3	1
1950 general election	Barrow-in-Furness	Walter Monslow	26,342	56.3	1
1950 general election	Birkenhead	Percy Collick	26,472	49.9	1
1951 general election	Barrow-in-Furness	Walter Monslow	26,709	56.9	1
1951 general election	Birkenhead	Percy Collick	29,014	55.0	1
1951 general election	Carmarthen	David Owen	25,165	49.5	2
1955 general election	Barrow-in-Furness	Walter Monslow	22,792	53.2	1
1955 general election	Birkenhead	Percy Collick	24,526	53.5	1
1955 general election	Central Ayrshire	Archie Manuel	21,003	52.1	1
1959 general election	Barrow-in-Furness	Walter Monslow	23,194	54.7	1
1959 general election	Birkenhead	Percy Collick	22,990	48.9	1
1959 general election	Central Ayrshire	Archie Manuel	21,901	52.0	1
1964 general election	Central Ayrshire	Archie Manuel	23,999	56.4	1
1966 general election	Central Ayrshire	Archie Manuel	24,035	57.7	1
Feb 1974 general election	South East Derbyshire	J. W. Wardle	16,981	37.4	2
1979 general election	Runcorn	George Joseph Maudsley	22,226	34.8	2
1983 general election	Dundee East	Charles Bowman	15,260	33.0	2
1983 general election	Gillingham	Anthony West	9,084	17.8	3
1992 general election	Hampstead and Highgate	Glenda Jackson	19,193	45.1	1

== Leadership ==
=== General Secretaries ===
- 1880: Joseph Brooke
- 1885: Thomas Sunter
- 1901: Albert E. Fox
- 1914: Jack Bromley
- 1936: Richard Squance
- 1940: William P. Allen
- 1948: Jim Baty
- 1956: Albert Hallworth
- 1960: William Evans
- 1964: Albert Griffiths
- 1970: Ray Buckton
- 1987: Neil Milligan
- 1990: Derrick Fullick
- 1993: Lew Adams
- 1998: Mick Rix
- 2003: Shaun Brady
- 2004: Keith Norman
- 2011: Mick Whelan
- 2026: Dave Calfe

=== Assistant General Secretaries ===
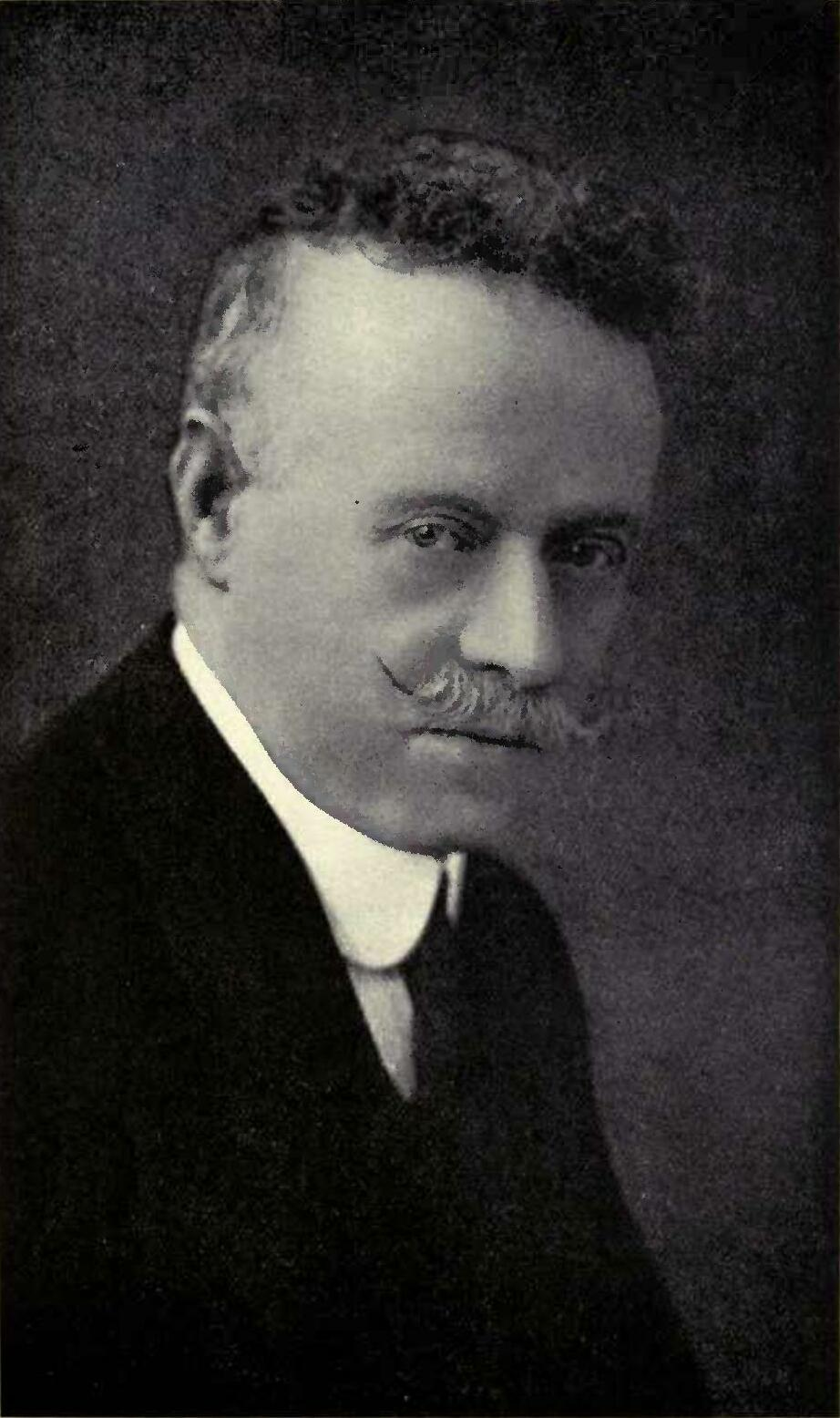
George Moore

- 1891: Henry Shuttleworth
- 1910: George Moore
- 1927: Richard Squance
- 1936: William P. Allen
- 1939: Percy Collick
- 1946: Jim Baty (acting)
- 1948: Albert Hallworth (acting)
- 1956: William Evans
- 1960: Albert Griffiths
- 1963: Ray Buckton
- 1970: Don Pullen
- 1985: Neil Milligan
- 1987: Derrick Fullick
- 1990: Lew Adams
- 1994: Tony West
- 2000: Mick Blackburn
- 2004: Post abolished
- 2009: Simon Weller

=== Presidents ===
- 1881: George Bamforth
- 1882: Henry Shuttleworth
- 1883: Samuel Holland
- 1880s: Henry Shuttleworth
- 1891: Moses John Dickinson
- 1893: Henry Parfitt
- 1896: J. Gough
- 1900: Albert E. Fox
- 1902: J. A. Hawkins
- 1907: George Moore
- 1910: Jack Bromley
- 1914: George Wride
- 1915: John Hunter
- 1917: George Wride
- 1918: Worthy Cooke
- 1919: W. A. Stephenson
- 1920: Richard Squance
- 1921: D. S. Humphreys
- 1930: William P. Allen
- 1934: Jim Baty
- 1937: William Evans
- 1939: S. Elliott
- 1942?: T. Burns
- 1945?: Ted Bidwell
- 1948: P. McGubbin
- 1952: Frederick Kelland
- 1954: N. A. Pinches
- 1958: Jack Simons
- 1963: Albert Atkinson
- 1965: Les Kirk
- 1968: George Thomas
- 1972: Les Feltham
- 1974: Bill Ronksley
- 1982: Derrick Fullick
- 1990: Willie O'Brien
- 1995: Clive Jones
- 1996: William Mackenzie
- 2000: David Tyson, Sean Madden,
- 2000: Martin Samways
- 2004: David Tyson
- 2005: Alan Donnelly
- 2015: Tosh McDonald
- 2019: Dave Calfe
- 2026: Andy Hudd

== See also ==
- Associated Society of Locomotive Engineers and Firemen v United Kingdom (2007)

== Sources and further reading ==
- Bagwell, Philip S. (1963). The Railwaymen. London: George Allen & Unwin.
- Bagwell, Philip S. (1982). The Railwaymen – Volume 2: the Beeching Era and After. London: George Allen & Unwin. ISBN 0-04-331084-2.
- Griffiths, Robert (2005). Driven by Ideals. London: Associated Society of Locomotive Engineers and Firemen.
- McKillop, Norman (1950). The Lighted Flame; a History of the Associated Society of Locomotive Engineers and Firemen. London & Edinburgh: Thomas Nelson & Sons Ltd.
- Raynes, John (1921), Engines and Men, Goodall & Suddick, Wikidata Q115680227
- Rose, John (1986). 100 Years of Kings Cross ASLEF; Solidarity Forever. London: Kings Cross ASLEF. ISBN 0-9512035-0-9.
- Rules of the Associated Society of Locomotive Engineers and Firemen (PDF). London: Associated Society of Locomotive Engineers and Firemen. 2019 [First edition 1881, Leeds].
