= SIRS =

SIRS may refer to:

- Systemic inflammatory response syndrome
- Scout International Relief Service

== See also ==
- Sirs, a surname (including a list of people with the surname)
- Not to be confused with SARS, a coronavirus disease, of which there are two related types, SARS, which is currently not a threat, and COVID-19.
