= Archie Marshall (politician) =

British Judge

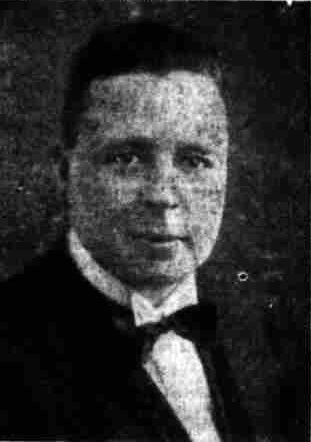
Pellow Marshall

Sir Archie Pellow Marshall (20 November 1899 – 20 June 1966) was a British local Liberal Party politician and High Court Judge.

== Background ==
He was the younger son of Alfred Ernest Stanley Marshall, of Roche, Cornwall. He was educated at Truro School, Cornwall and Gonville and Caius College, Cambridge, MA, LLB (Camb.), 1921–25. In 1926 he married Meta Hawke, of Bugle, Cornwall. They had one son and one daughter. In 1959 he was knighted. He was elected a bard of the Cornish Gorseth in 1963, taking the Bardic name Brusyas an Gernewyon (Judge of the Cornish).

== Legal career ==
He was called to Bar and joined the Midland Circuit in 1925. He took silk becoming a King's Counsel in 1947. He became a High Court Judge in 1959. In 1963 he presided over the trial of Dr. Stephen Ward. Geoffrey Robertson, a Queen's Counsel who has written a book on the trial, Stephen Ward was Innocent, OK, says that on more than one significant legal point, Marshall misdirected the jurors. The transcript of his summing up, lodged at the National Archives, has been closed and classified as secret until the year 2046. The case has been described as "a gross miscarriage of justice".

== Political career ==
In 1924 he was President of the Cambridge Union. He was also Chairman of Cambridge University Liberal Club from 1923 to 1924 and a vice-chairman of the National League of Young Liberals. He was Chairman of the Union of University Liberal Societies from 1924 to 1925. He was Liberal candidate for the King's Norton Division of Birmingham at the 1929 General Election.

General Election 1929: Birmingham Kings Norton Electorate: 41,602
Party	Candidate	Votes	%	±%
Conservative	Lionel Beaumont-Thomas	14,464	42.0	
Labour	Robert Dennison	13,973	40.6	
Liberal	Archie Marshall	5,998	17.4	
Majority		491	1.4	
Turnout			82.8	
Conservative gain from Labour		Swing		

He was Liberal candidate again for the King's Norton Division at the 1931 General Election.

General Election 1931: Birmingham Kings Norton Electorate: 47,399
Party	Candidate	Votes	%	±%
Conservative	Lionel Beaumont-Thomas	22,063	57.5	+15.5
Labour	Dick Mitchison	11,016	28.7	−11.9
Liberal	Archie Marshall	5,294	13.8	−3.6
Majority		11,047	28.8	+27.4
Turnout			81.0	−1.8
Conservative hold		Swing	+13.7	

In 1939 he was selected as prospective Liberal parliamentary candidate for a general election expected to take place within a year. He was Liberal candidate for the Hereford Division of Herefordshire at the 1945 General Election.

General Election 1945: Hereford Electorate: 48,574
Party	Candidate	Votes	%	±%
Conservative	James Thomas	17,439	51.8	
Labour	William Pigott	8,359	24.8	
Liberal	Archie Marshall	7,871	23.4	
Majority		9,080	27.0	
Turnout			69.3	
Conservative hold		Swing		

He was President of the London Cornish Association.
