= Harry Douglass =

British trade unionist (1902–1978)

Harry Douglass, Baron Douglass of Cleveland (1 January 1902 – 5 April 1978) was a British trade unionist.

Born in Middlesbrough, England, Douglass entered work at the age of 13, becoming a steel melter. He immediately joined the Iron and Steel Trades Confederation, and became a member of its executive council in 1933. Two years later, he was appointed as a full-time organiser for the union, then rose to become Assistant General Secretary in 1945 and finally General Secretary in 1953, serving until 1967. He was also President of the International Metal Workers' Federation.

Douglass also chaired the British Productivity Council, and served as the President of the Trades Union Congress in 1967. On retirement he was created a life peer on 22 September 1967, taking the title Baron Douglass of Cleveland, of Cleveland in the County of York.

Trade union offices
Preceded by Lincoln Evans	Assistant General Secretary of the Iron and Steel Trades Confederation; 1945-53	Succeeded by Dai Davies
Preceded by Lincoln Evans	General Secretary of the Iron and Steel Trades Confederation; 1953-67	Succeeded by Dai Davies
Preceded by Lincoln Evans and Jack Owen	Iron, Steel and Minor Metal Trades representative on the General Council of the TUC; 1953 – 1967; With: Joseph O'Hagan (1953–1966)	Succeeded by Dai Davies
Preceded by Claude Bartlett and Bill Webber	Trades Union Congress representative to the AFL-CIO; 1963; With: Anne Godwin	Succeeded by William Carron and George Lowthian
Preceded by Joseph O'Hagan	President of the Trades Union Congress; 1967	Succeeded by Lewis Wright
