= Ivor Gwynne =

Ivor H. Gwynne (1867–1934) was a Welsh trade unionist and politician.

== Biography ==
Born in Briton Ferry, Gwynne worked in the tinplate industry all his life. He joined the Independent Association of Tinplate Makers on its formation in 1886, but it collapsed in 1898. Gwynne was central to the formation of a new union, the Tin and Sheet Millmen's Association, becoming its first president. In 1904, he stood for the full-time general secretaryship of the union. Initial results indicated that he had been narrowly defeated by Henry Davies, but some branches had allowed non-members to vote, and when the election was re-run, Gwynne won.

In 1905, Gwynne moved to Swansea to take up his new post, and he became involved in local politics. Ramsay MacDonald asked him to stand for the Labour Representation Committee in East Carmarthenshire at the 1906 general election; the union was prepared to sponsor his candidacy, but it did not ultimately go ahead. In 1907, he was elected to Swansea County Borough Council, and took a particular interest in education, becoming chairman of the council's Education Committee in 1910.

Gwynne also involved himself with the Trades Union Congress (TUC), and in 1913 he was its delegate to the American Federation of Labour. He also served on various committees, including the court of Cardiff University, as Chairman of Swansea Technical College, and was appointed as a magistrate. He was a sub-area substitution officer for Swansea during World War I, then, in 1918, became an alderman on Swansea Town Council.

At the 1918 general election, Gwynne stood for the Labour Party in Pembrokeshire; he took 28.0% of the vote and was not elected.

The Millmen became part of the Iron and Steel Trades Confederation in 1921, and Gwynne was appointed as the new union's Tinplate Advisory Officer. Although less prominent in his new role, he served on the government's Haddow Committee into education from 1924 to 1926.

Trade union offices
New post	President of the Tin and Sheet Millmen's Association; 1899 – 1904	Succeeded by M. Griffiths
Preceded by Thomas Philips	General Secretary of the Tin and Sheet Millmen's Association; 1904 – 1921	Post abolished
Preceded by James Andrew Seddon; Robert Smillie	Trades Union Congress representative to the American Federation of Labour; 1913; With: Thomas Greenall	Succeeded by Charles Ammon; Ernest Bevin
