= Thomas Hackett =

Thomas Hackett may refer to:

- Thomas Hackett (Jacobite), Irish Jacobite official and merchant
- Thomas C. Hackett (c. 1798–1851), American politician and lawyer
- Thomas Hackett (British politician) (1869–1950), British co-operative activist and politician
- Thomas Bernard Hackett (1836–1880), Irish recipient of the Victoria Cross

== See also ==
- Tom Hackett (born 1992), Australian player of American football
