= Ronald Cartland =

British politician

Major Ronald Cartland MP
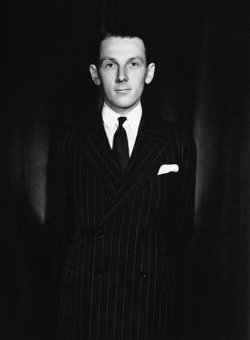

Member of Parliament for Birmingham King's Norton
- In office 14 November 1935 – 30 May 1940
- Preceded by: Lionel Beaumont-Thomas
- Succeeded by: John Peto

Personal details
- Born: 3 January 1907 Birmingham, England, UK
- Died: 30 May 1940 (aged 33) Watou, Belgium
- Cause of death: Killed in action
- Party: Conservative
- Relations: Barbara Cartland (sister)
- Education: Charterhouse School

Major John Ronald Hamilton Cartland (3 January 1907 – 30 May 1940) was a British Conservative Party politician. He was the Member of Parliament (MP) for King's Norton in Birmingham from 1935 until he was killed in action in 1940 during the British Expeditionary Force's retreat to Dunkirk. He was the brother of the novelist Barbara Cartland.

== Early life ==
Cartland was the son of Major Bertram Cartland and Mary Hamilton Scobell, and the younger brother of prolific romance author Barbara Cartland. He was the maternal nephew of Major-General Sir John Scobell. His paternal grandfather was a wealthy Birmingham brass founder who died four years before Ronald's birth. When the family's wealth diminished following the death of Ronald's grandmother, his father and his family moved to a rented farmhouse near the town of Pershore, Worcestershire.

In 1910, Bertram went to work for the local Conservative Party office, where he managed the election of the candidate. When he won the election, the new MP offered Bertram the post of private secretary. When the First World War broke out in 1914, his father, Bertram volunteered for military duty; he was killed near Berry-au-Bac, France, in June 1918.

In 1919 Mary Cartland, along with Ronald, her 18-year-old daughter Barbara and 8-year-old son Anthony, moved to London, and Ronald gained a scholarship to Charterhouse School, a public school in Surrey. While there he expressed his desire to become a Conservative MP, but at the same time, he held progressive views that were at odds with the party and the prevailing social norms at Charterhouse.

When Ronald was a child, Mary would take him with her on her trips to some of the poorer areas of Pershore, giving him a first-hand look at their dire living conditions. After he left Charterhouse, since Mary could not afford to send her son to university, Ronald went to work at Conservative Party Central Office in London.

== Parliamentary career ==
After Lionel Beaumont-Thomas decided to retire on health grounds in 1933, Cartland was chosen to replace him in Herbert Austin's former constituency of King's Norton, Birmingham. His selection was supported by the Chamberlain family, long the most powerful force in Birmingham Conservative circles. He won in the 1935 election and became one of the youngest MPs in the Commons.

Cartland's maiden speech to the Commons, in May 1936, attacked the National Government of Prime Minister Stanley Baldwin for its less-than-enthusiastic attitude in aiding 'distressed areas', the parts of the UK that were suffering from extreme economic difficulties, with unemployment rates as high as 40%. In 1936, he delivered a rebuke to the Treasury for balancing the budget on the backs of Britain's poor, attacking Neville Chamberlain, then serving as Baldwin's Chancellor of the Exchequer, despite Chamberlain's role in Cartland's selection as a Conservative candidate.

After Chamberlain succeeded Baldwin as Prime Minister, Cartland earned the wrath of the Conservative Party's hierarchy by taking a stand against the Government's policy of appeasement of Germany and Italy, which brought him to the attention of other Conservative dissident backbenchers, as well as Winston Churchill. Before Cartland's election in 1935, he and his sister Barbara had visited Germany, where Ronald was appalled at the Nazi persecution of Jews.

On his return, he warned his fellow MPs of Adolf Hitler's expansionist plans for Austria and other countries of Central Europe and that sooner or later, Britain would be at war with Germany.

He served as a backbench MP during Chamberlain's government. He is most famous for a speech that he gave to the house in August 1939 in which he accused the Prime Minister of having "ideas of dictatorship". Chamberlain had decided to adjourn the House until 3 October and instructed Conservative MPs that a majority vote for adjournment would be seen as a vote of confidence. That caused outrage in the House and prompted Cartland to stand up and make his famous speech, which also included what turned out to be prophetic words for himself: "We are in the situation that within a month we may be going to fight, and we may be going to die."

== Military career ==
Cartland achieved the rank of major in the British Army. In February 1937, he was commissioned in the Territorial Army. By August 1939, he was a lieutenant in the Worcestershire and Oxfordshire Yeomanry. When the Germans commenced the French and Low Countries campaign in May 1940, he was serving in the 53rd Anti-Tank Regiment (The Worcestershire Yeomanry), Royal Artillery. The unit was assigned to defend the town of Cassel, a hilltop site near one of the main roads leading to the Channel port of Dunkirk, France. Cartland and his men held off the Germans from 27 to 29 May. On the evening of 29 May, Cartland and his unit split up and joined the retreating British Expeditionary Force, which was heading towards Dunkirk. On 30 May 1940 during the Battle of Dunkirk, while he was reconnoitering his position from a ditch, he was shot and killed near Watou, Belgium.

Cartland was initially listed as missing. His family did not learn of his fate until January 1941 when his mother received a letter from one of Cartland's men, who was now a German prisoner-of-war. The soldier described Cartland's death in detail. His brother, James, had died the previous day and is buried at Zuidschote. A memorial service was held for Ronald Cartland on 18 February 1941, at London's St Martin-in-the-Fields Church. He is now buried at Hotton War Cemetery, in Hotton, Belgium.

== Personal life ==
Cartland was gay.

== Legacy ==
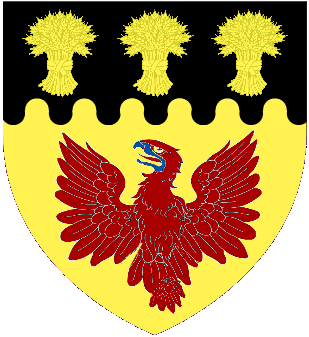
His shield of arms is displayed in the Chamber of the House of Commons.

He is commemorated with his father and brother with a calvary at Tewkesbury Abbey. His name is to be found on the Memorial Chapel at Charterhouse School.

His sister Barbara published a biography of him. She described him as "terribly inspiring" and said Winston Churchill "adored him" for his opposition to Chamberlain's policy of appeasing Hitler. In her autobiography The Path To Power, Margaret Thatcher referred to Cartland as a "young, idealistic, Conservative MP". Labour MP Chris Bryant wrote about Cartland and his young, gay Conservative colleagues who opposed Chamberlain's appeasement in his non-fiction work The Glamour Boys: The Secret Story of the Rebels who Fought for Britain to Defeat Hitler.

Cartland was played by Tom Burke in the 2008 television film In Love with Barbara, inspired by the life of Barbara Cartland.

== Bibliography ==
- Olson, Lynne: Troublesome Young Men: The Rebels Who Brought Churchill to Power and Helped Save England, Farrar, Strous, Giroux, 2007

Parliament of the United Kingdom
Preceded by Lionel Beaumont-Thomas	Member of Parliament for Birmingham King's Norton; 1935–1940	Succeeded by John Peto
