= Edward Trow =

British trade unionist

Edward Trow (29 June 1833 – 9 February 1899) was a British trade unionist.

== Life ==
Born in Wolverhampton, Trow grew up in Wednesbury. He left school when he was ten years old, and found employment at an ironworks, alongside his father. Three years later, he became a puddler at the works, then in 1850, he moved to Glasgow, in 1852 on to Consett, and then various locations until he returned to the Black Country early in the 1860s. There, he joined the Associated Ironworkers of Great Britain union, becoming a branch secretary.

In 1867, Trow moved to Darlington, again in search of work. The Associated Ironworkers did not organise in the town, so Trow transferred to the National Association of Ironworkers, led by John Kane. Given his experience, Trow was immediately as secretary of his lodge. The following year, Kane reformed the union as the Amalgamated Malleable Ironworkers of Great Britain, and Trow was elected to its first general council. In 1872, he was elected as both president and assistant secretary of the union, then in 1874 switched the presidency for the post of treasurer, which was made full-time.

Within the union, Trow focused on promoting negotiation with employers, avoiding industrial action, and for centralising power in the union, rather than allowing district high levels of autonomy. He also joined the Board of Arbitration and Conciliation for the Manufactured Iron Trade in the North of England. Kane died in 1876, and Trow succeeded him as general secretary, but was faced with a union which was in rapid decline. By 1887, it was evident that he was unable to do so, and the new British Steel Smelters' Association was recruiting many potential members.

Trow organised a conference which formed the Associated Iron and Steel Workers of Great Britain, becoming its first general secretary, although he remained secretary of the Malleable Ironworkers until it was merged into the new union in 1892. This new union proved a success, working closely with conciliation boards and gradually uniting workers around the UK. Trow remained its secretary until his sudden death, early in 1899.

In his spare time, Trow served on the 1892 Royal Commission on Labour, and was vice-president of the Darlington Liberal Association. He once stood for Darlington's council as a Liberal-Labour representative, but was not elected, and decided against pursuing a political career.

Trade union offices
Preceded by ?	President of the Amalgamated Malleable Ironworkers of Great Britain; 1872–1874	Succeeded by William Aucott
Preceded by New position	Assistant Secretary of the Amalgamated Malleable Ironworkers of Great Britain; 1872–1876	Succeeded by Position abolished
Preceded by John Kane	General Secretary of the Amalgamated Malleable Ironworkers of Great Britain; 1876–1892	Succeeded by Position abolished
Preceded by New position	General Secretary of the Associated Iron and Steel Workers of Great Britain; 1887–1899	Succeeded by James Cox
