= Keith Brookman, Baron Brookman =

British trade unionist (1937–2025)

The Right Honourable The Lord Brookman
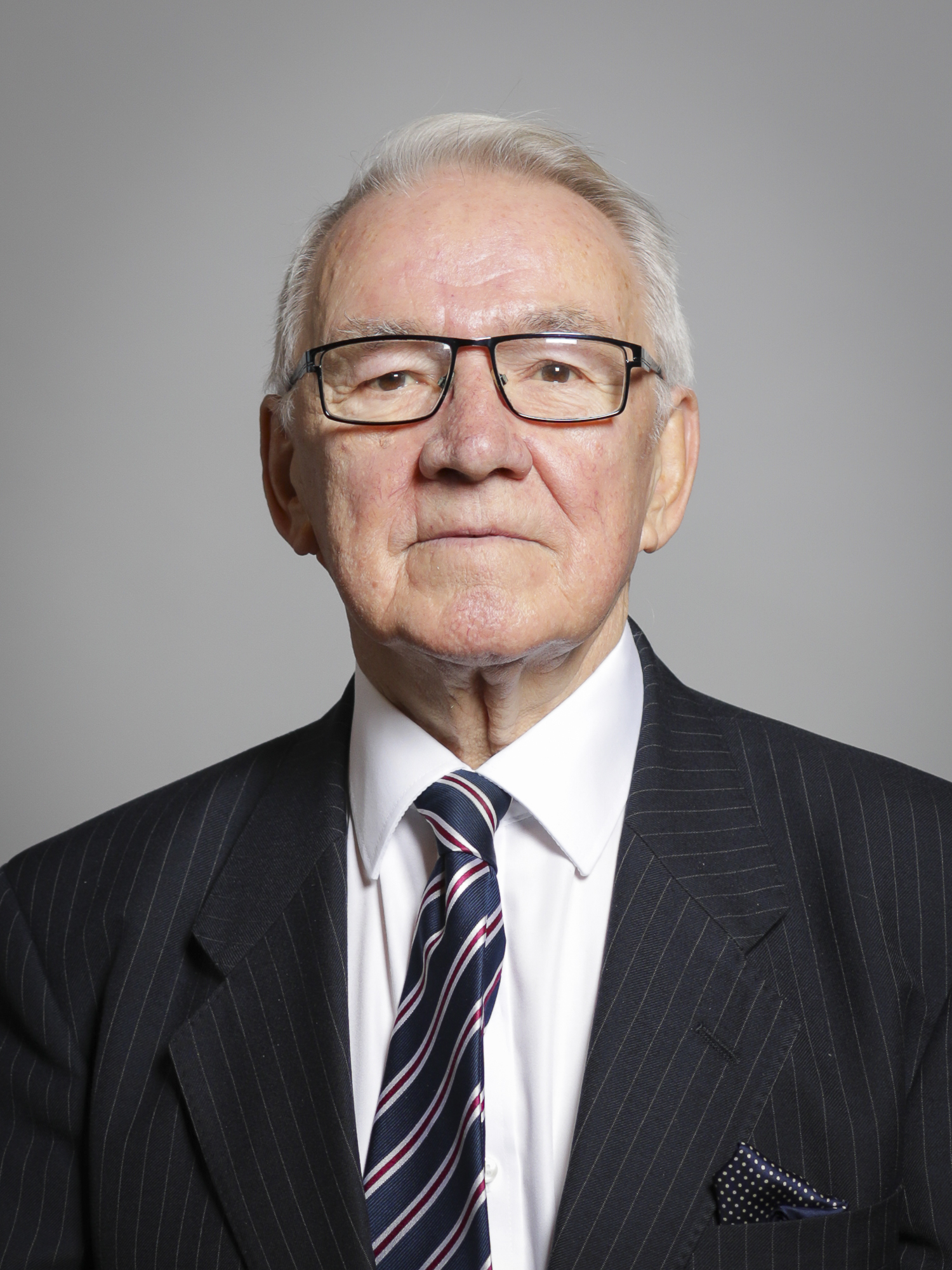
- Lord Brookman in 2019

Member of the House of Lords
- Lord Temporal
- Life peerage 30 July 1998 – 2 April 2020

Personal details
- Born: 3 January 1937
- Died: 22 January 2025 (aged 88)
- Party: Labour
- Education: Nantyglo Grammar School

David Keith Brookman, Baron Brookman (3 January 1937 – 22 January 2025) was a British steel worker and trade unionist.

== Life and career ==
The son of George Henry Brookman and Blodwin Nash, he was educated at Nantyglo Grammar School in Monmouthshire. Brookman worked as steel worker for Richard Thomas and Baldwins in Ebbw Vale from 1953 until 1955, when he began his service in the Royal Air Force. In 1957, he returned to his job and performed it to 1973. For the Iron and Steel Trades Confederation, he was divisional organiser from 1973 to 1985, assistant general secretary from 1985 to 1993 and general secretary from 1993 to 1999. From 1993, he was a board member of British Steel plc and UK Steel Enterprise.

From 1976 to 1982, Brookman was member of the TUC Educational Advisory Committee for Wales and from 1992 to 1999, of the Trades Union Congress. He was also member of the European Coal and Steel Committee from 1992 to 2002 and of the International Metalworkers' Federation. Between 1992 and 1999, he was further president of the Iron and Steel Non-Ferrous Department. Brookman was member of the Joint Industrial Council for Slag Industry and of the British Steel Joint Accident Prevention Advisory Committee from 1985 to 1993. He was also a member of the British Steel Advisory Committee on Education and Training from 1986 to 1993, and of the executive council of the European Metalworkers' Federation from 1985 to 1995. From 1991, he was a member of the National T.U. Steel Co-ordinating Committee and from 1993, its chairman. Between 1993 and 2002, he was a member of the European Coal and Steel Community Consultative Committee, between 1993 and 1998 joint secretary of the British Steel Strip Trade Board and of the British Steel Joint Standing Committee, as well as joint secretary of the British Steel European Works Council between 1996 and 1999.

Brookman was governor of the Gwent College of Higher Education from 1980 to 1984 and trustee of the Julian Melchett Trust from 1985 to 1995. From 2001, he was president of the Welsh Trust for Prevention of Abuse.

On 30 July 1998, he was created a life peer with the title Baron Brookman, of Ebbw Vale in the County of Gwent and took the Labour whip. In May 2019 it was revealed that Brookman claimed over £50,000 in expenses, covering a 12-month period, during which he never once spoke or submitted written questions and never took part in a single debate. He retired from the House of Lords in April 2020.

From 1958, he was married to Patricia Worthington, daughter of Lawrence Worthington. They have three daughters.

Brookman died after a long illness on 22 January 2025, at the age of 88.

== Sources ==
Trade union offices
Preceded by Roy Evans	Assistant General Secretary of the Iron and Steel Trades Confederation; 1985–1993	Succeeded by Michael J. Leahy
Preceded by Roy Evans	General Secretary of the Iron and Steel Trades Confederation; 1993–1999	Succeeded by Michael J. Leahy
