= Wire Workers' Union =

Former trade union of the United Kingdom

- Merged into: Iron and Steel Trades Confederation
- Founded: 1840
- Dissolved: 1991
- Headquarters: Prospect House, Alma Street, Sheffield
- Location: United Kingdom
- Members: 13,000 (1960s)
- Affiliations: Trades Union Congress

The Wire Workers' Union was a trade union in England which existed between 1840 and 1991. It represented workers involved in the manufacture of wire.

== History ==
The union originated in 1840 as the Federated Wire Drawers Association, bringing together various local unions. Although it had some success among those involved in the manufacture of thick wire, workers in thin wire did not join. By 1868, its total membership was only 700 and based entirely in England, but it adopted the new name of the Thick Iron and Steel Wire Drawers Association.

The association struggled through the Long Depression of the 1870s, and almost collapsed, being refounded in 1886 as the Iron and Steel Wire Drawers Trade Superannuation Gift and Burial Society of Great Britain. On this basis, it gained membership across the north of England and also in Birmingham, finally persuading the Halifax Small Wire Drawers to affiliate. In 1890, it became the Federated Wire Drawers Trade and Sick Benefit Society of the United Kingdom, with membership rising above 1,000 by the end of the decade.

In 1901, the federation adopted a more centralised structure and was again renamed, as the Amalgamated Wire Drawers Trade and Sick Benefit Society of the United Kingdom, then in 1908 it became the Amalgamated Wire Drawers Society of Great Britain, membership soon moving over 2,000. From 1916, unskilled wire workers were admitted, taking membership to 5,000 and prompting a further name change to the Amalgamated Society of Wire Drawers and Kindred Workers. In 1922, it merged into the Iron and Steel Trades Confederation (ISTC), but left again only two years later, re-establishing an independent existence.

Writing in the 1940s, G. D. H. Cole described the union as one of the three major unions dedicated solely to the metalworking industry in Britain, alongside the ISTC and the National Union of Blastfurnacemen. The society reached its peak in the 1960s with membership over 13,000, but then rapidly declined. It merged with the Card Dressers Union in 1984, adopting its final name of the Wire Workers' Union, although by that point the Card Dressers had only twenty members remaining. Membership slumped to around 5,000, so in 1991 the union merged with the Iron and Steel Trades Confederation.

== General Secretaries ==
J. Bramwell
1908: Alfred Birtles
1935: T. Seed
1958: R. Birtwhistle
1968: Len Carr
1983: Matt Ardron
