= Thomas McKenna (trade unionist) =

British trade unionist

Thomas McKenna (4 April 1876 – 13 October 1939) was a British trade unionist.

McKenna was born in Felling, Tyne and Wear, to an Irish father. By 1885, McKenna was employed at an ironworks in Stockton-on-Tees, and he joined the National Association of Blastfurnacemen in 1889, becoming an official of the renamed National Federation of Blastfurnacemen around 1899. He was elected as secretary of the Cleveland and Durham Blastfurnacemen and Cokemen's Association in 1912, then in 1914, he was elected as the federation's president, and as its general secretary in 1917.

Under McKenna's leadership, the federation became a more centralised union, the National Union of Blastfurnacemen, Ore Miners, Coke Workers and Kindred Trades. He also took part in the International Metalworkers' Federation, becoming secretary of its British section in 1930.

In 1939, McKenna was appointed to the iron and steel control committee of the Ministry of Supply, but he died later in the year.

Trade union offices
Preceded by Patrick Walls	Secretary of the National Union of Blastfurnacemen, Ore Miners, Coke Workers and Kindred Trades; 1917 – 1939	Succeeded by Ambrose Callighan
