= John Hodge (politician) =

British politician

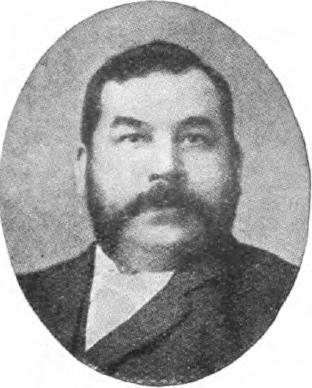
- John Hodge, c. 1905

Minister of Pensions
- In office 17 August 1917 – 10 January 1919
- Prime Minister: David Lloyd George
- Preceded by: George Barnes
- Succeeded by: Laming Worthington-Evans

Minister of Labour
- In office 10 December 1916 – 17 August 1917
- Prime Minister: David Lloyd George
- Preceded by: Office Established
- Succeeded by: George Henry Roberts

Deputy Leader of the Labour Party
- In office 10 November 1914 – 8 January 1919
- Leader: Arthur Henderson; William Adamson
- Preceded by: Alfred Henry Gill
- Succeeded by: J. R. Clynes

Member of Parliament for Manchester Gorton
- In office 8 February 1906 – 6 December 1923
- Preceded by: Ernest Hatch
- Succeeded by: Joseph Compton

Personal details
- Born: John Hodge; 29 October 1855 Linkeyburn, Ayrshire, Scotland, UK
- Died: 10 August 1937 (aged 81)
- Party: Labour
- Other political affiliations: Coalition Labour
- Education: Hutchesons' Grammar School

John Hodge (29 October 1855 – 10 August 1937) was a Labour Party and later Coalition Labour politician in the United Kingdom. He was the UK's first Minister of Labour, and the second Minister of Pensions.

== Early life ==
Hodge was born in Linkeyburn, Ayrshire and attended Ironworks School and Hutchesons' Grammar School. When he was thirteen Hodge left school to become a solicitor's clerk and then worked a grocer's shop before joining the local iron works as a puddler—the same job as his father.

Hodge first became involved with trade unionism while at the local iron works. Hodge helped form the British Steel Smelters' Association in 1885, of which he would be elected secretary, after bosses at Colville in Motherwell informed workers that their wages would be twenty per cent lower than before. The BSSA was a success and by the summer of 1886 practically every smelter in Scotland had become a member and by 1888 the BSSA had members joining from England and Wales and become affiliated with the TUC. The BSSA rarely organised strikes, but Hodge was successful at negotiating increases in wages.

Hodge also helped form the Associated Society of Millmen, acting as its secretary and treasurer for a year before its members could hold an election.

== Political career ==
Hodge (third from right, at the rear) in 1906, with other leading figures in the party

Hodge was a member of the Manchester City Council from 1897 to 1901.

At the 1900 general election, Hodge unsuccessfully contested Gower. He was unsuccessful again in Preston at the by-election in May 1903.

He finally won a seat at the 1906 general election, when he was elected as the Labour Party Member of Parliament for Manchester Gorton.

When the United Kingdom declared war and entered World War I in 1914, Hodge took a very patriotic stance and criticised other Labour politicians for opposing it. From 1915 to 1916 Hodge was Acting Chairman of the Labour Party. In 1916 he was part of the Mesopotamia Commission of Inquiry. He was also elected as president of the British Iron, Steel & Kindred Trades Association which he had helped to form with other iron and steel unions. He was Chairman of the 'patriotic labour' British Worker's National League

From December 1916 to August 1917, Hodge was the first Minister of Labour and had a seat in the Cabinet. At this job Hodge claimed that all strikes during war-time were acts of treason and Hodge successfully made striking boilermakers go back to work by threatening to charge them under the Defence of the Realm Act. Hodge supported the Empire Resources Department Committee, signing its manifesto. From August 1917 to January 1919, Hodge was Minister of Pensions in the Lloyd George Coalition Government. In 1919 he appeared in the film Broken in the Wars directed by Cecil Hepworth to advertise a fund set up for ex-servicemen.

Hodge kept his seat in both the general election of 1918 and the general election of 1922 but retired from Parliament at the general election of 1923. Hodge continued to argue against strikes during the General Strike of 1926 and retired from the presidency of the British Iron, Steel & Kindred Trades Association in 1931.

Hodge was turned down for military service because he was too old. Arthur Griffith-Boscawen, who served under Hodge, called him a "fat, rampaging and most patriotic Tory working man".

Parliament of the United Kingdom
Preceded by Ernest Frederic George Hatch	Member of Parliament for Manchester Gorton; 1906–1923	Succeeded by Joseph Compton
Trade union offices
Preceded by New position	General Secretary of the British Steel Smelters' Association; 1886 – 1917	Succeeded by Position abolished
Preceded by New position	General Secretary of the Associated Society of Millmen; 1888 – 1889	Succeeded by John Cronin
Preceded by Thomas Burt	President of the Trades Union Congress; 1892	Succeeded by Samuel Munro
Preceded by Joseph Nicholas Bell and Allan Gee	Trades Union Congress representative to the American Federation of Labour; 1907; With: David Shackleton	Succeeded by Herbert Skinner and John Wadsworth
Preceded by New position	President of the Iron and Steel Trades Confederation; 1917 – 1931	Succeeded by Lincoln Evans
Political offices
New title	Minister of Labour; 1916–1917	Succeeded by George Henry Roberts
Preceded by George Barnes	Minister of Pensions; 1917–1919	Succeeded by Sir Laming Worthington-Evans, Bt
Party political offices
Preceded by William Charles Steadman	Chairman of the Annual Conference of the Labour Representation Committee; 1901	Succeeded by William John Davis
Preceded by Richard Bell	Chairman of the Labour Representation Committee; 1903–1904	Succeeded by David Shackleton
Preceded by Joseph Nicholas Bell	Chairman of the Annual Conference of the Labour Representation Committee; 1904	Succeeded by Arthur Henderson
