= Thomas Walsh (trade unionist) =

British trade unionist

Thomas Walsh J.P. (7 November 1891 – 25 September 1964) was a British trade unionist.

Born in Grangetown, North Yorkshire, Walsh left school at the age of 13 and worked in the steelworks as an errand boy before getting a job in the blastfurnaces. He volunteered to serve in the Connaught Regiment during the First World War.

In 1919, after the war, Walsh returned to the blastfurnaces at Redcar Iron Works and became an active local official and works delegate for the National Union of Blastfurnacemen. In 1929 he became lodge delegate. In 1931 became a member of the Cleveland Wages Committee. He was appointed to the executive in 1936, and in 1939 was appointed District Secretary of the Cleveland and Durham District of the union.

A member of the Grangetown Labour Party, after the Second World War Walsh was elected to the North Regional Labour Party Executive. In 1953 he was elected National President of the union.

Walsh was appointed magistrate in 1944 and appointed Chairman of South Bank Justices in 1962.

Trade union offices
Preceded by Joseph O'Hagan	President of the National Union of Blastfurnacemen, Ore Miners, Coke Workers and Kindred Trades; 1953–1959	Succeeded by Position abolished
