= John Peto (politician) =

Major Basil Arthur John Peto (13 December 1900 – 3 February 1954) was a British Conservative Party politician.

== Early life ==
Peto was born 13 December 1900 at Chertsey, Surrey, the son of Sir Basil Peto, a former Member of Parliament. Peto was educated at Harrow School and St John's College, Cambridge, where he read history and political economy.

== Military ==
In 1924, Peto was commissioned in the Royal Artillery; two years later he transferred to the King's Dragoon Guards. In 1929, he was appointed as ADC to the governor of Bombay, and from 1932 to 1935 he served in India. Peto retired in 1939, but, with the start of the Second World War in 1939, Peto rejoined the army.

== Politics ==
As a founder member of the Cambridge University Conservative Association and a father who was a Member of Parliament he always had an interest in politics. In 1941, Peto was elected as Member of Parliament (MP) for Birmingham King's Norton at a by-election in May 1941 following the death of the sitting MP Ronald Cartland. From 1941 to 1945, Peto was a parliamentary private secretary to Geoffrey Lloyd chairman of the Oil Control Board. Peto stood again at the 1945 general election but was defeated by the Labour Party candidate, Raymond Blackburn.

== Family and later life ==
Peto married Patricia Geraldine Browne in 1934; the couple had a son and three daughters. On 3 February 1954, Peto was found shot dead in the garden of his home in Witley, Surrey with the gun beside him. It was concluded that Peto, who regularly shot in his gardens, had slipped on ice and shot himself.

Parliament of the United Kingdom
Preceded by Ronald Cartland	Member of Parliament for Birmingham King's Norton; 1941–1945	Succeeded by Raymond Blackburn
