= Richard Thomas (tin plate manufacturer) =

Richard Thomas (5 December 1837 – 28 September 1916) was an English tin plate manufacturer. He was the founder of Richard Thomas & Co., which later merged with Baldwins Ltd to become Richard Thomas and Baldwins, which in turn was absorbed into British Steel Corporation in the 1960s.

== Biography ==
Richard Thomas was born 5 Dec 1837 in Bridgwater, Somerset. He was the eldest son of Richard Thomas (25 Dec 1814-31 Jan 1895), a Somerset shipowner and merchant. The younger Richard Thomas attended the Wesleyan Collegiate Institute in Taunton before starting work as a clerk in his uncle's draper's shop in Oxford. He then worked at various jobs in the coal mining industry in Wales, including as a coal exporter, a commission agent, a works manager and an accountant. In 1863, he moved into the tin plate industry when he became accountant and sub-manager of an iron and tin plate works in Neath. In 1871, he founded his own company: Richard Thomas & Co. He acquired tin plate works at Lydbrook in Gloucestershire and Lydney, and then the colliery at Lydbrook. Financial problems caused directly by the flooding of Lydbrook Colliery led Richard Thomas to liquidate his company in 1883, but it was relaunched as Richard Thomas & Co. Ltd in 1884, with the financial backing of the Barrow Hematite Steel Company.

Thomas married Anne Loveluck (06 Feb 1837–04 Apr 1914) daughter of John Loveluck of Hafod Talog, Margam in Cardiff on 18 February 1859. Anne bore thirteen children, a number of whom did not survive to adulthood. His eldest son, Richard Beaumont Thomas, succeeded him as managing director of Richard Thomas & Co. Ltd. Three of his other surviving sons namely Harold Massey-Thomas of Moor Hall, Hubert Spence-Thomas of Cae Pwcella and Wyndham Partridge Thomas of Caxton House held prominent positions within Richard Thomas and Co. Ltd. Richard Thomas died in Bath on 28 September 1916. His will was proved at £92,140 at Bristol Registry Office on 11 Apr 1917. By this time, Richard Thomas & Co. Ltd and its associated companies employed over 11,000 in South Wales.
