= Raymond Blackburn =

British politician

Member of Parliament for Birmingham Northfield Birmingham King's Norton (1945–1950)
- In office 26 July 1945 – 25 October 1951
- Preceded by: John Peto
- Succeeded by: Donald Chapman

Personal details
- Born: Albert Raymond Blackburn; 3 November 1915 Bournemouth, Hampshire, UK
- Died: 3 November 1991 (aged 76) Charing Cross Hospital, London, UK
- Party: Labour
- Other political affiliations: Common Wealth Party
- Parent: Dr A. E. Blackburn (father)
- Education: Rugby School

Albert Raymond Blackburn (11 March 1915 – 3 November 1991) was a British Labour Party politician who served as Member of Parliament for the Birmingham King's Norton and Birmingham Northfield constituencies.

== Early life ==
Blackburn was born on 11 March 1915 in Bournemouth, Hampshire (now Dorset). He was the son of Dr A. E. Blackburn. He was educated at the private Rugby School.

== Military service ==
He served in the British Army during World War II. On 21 January 1940, having completed his officer training at Sandhurst, he was commissioned into the East Yorkshire Regiment as a second lieutenant. He was given the service number 113779. On 1 July 1942, he transferred from the East Yorkshire Regiment to the Royal Regiment of Artillery. He reached the rank of captain.

On 4 January 1955, having been convicted of a crime by the civil authorities, he was "removed from the Army". He had been an alcoholic who later campaigned against alcohol abuse and wrote a self-help book published in 1959.

== Political career ==
Blackburn stood unsuccessfully for the Common Wealth Party in the 1943 Watford by-election. He then won the King's Norton seat for Labour at the 1945 general election, defeating the sitting Conservative MP Basil Arthur John Peto but at the 1950 general election switched to the newly created Northfield seat. He left Parliament the following year.

Blackburn's political career, which began promisingly with his maiden speech being praised by Winston Churchill, was blighted by his alcoholism with the first of a series of arrests for drunkenness coming in 1947. Falling into further legal difficulties Blackburn was declared bankrupt in 1952 and imprisoned in 1956 for fraud regarding the illegal use of a caravan site, and for unlawfully inducing people to buy shares in a worthless company. He served 16 months in prison. He publicly acknowledged his drink problem and even wrote a 1959 book discussing how alcohol had ruined his career.

== Moral and judicial crusader ==
After disappearing from the public view for a time Blackburn returned as a moral crusader, working closely with anti-pornography campaigner Lord Longford. His other campaigns included a failed drive against gambling and attempts to prosecute the films Mera ur kärlekens språk and Language of Love for gross indecency, the former successfully, the latter unsuccessfully. Although Mera ur kärlekens språk was the sequel of Language of Love Blackburn opted to prosecute the later film first.

Blackburn also took part in a number of prominent legal challenges of major constitutional significance, including R v Commissioner of Metropolitan Police, ex parte Blackburn, on illegal gambling and the duties of the police, and Blackburn v Attorney-General, on the constitutionality of the European Communities Act 1972.

Blackburn petitioned the court for a writ in regards to the Betting, Gaming and Lotteries Act 1963. The case was described as follows: "A and B are alleged to have committed a crime. A is charged with the crime, convicted and sentenced. B is not charged. At the trial of A there is evidence which suggests that B may have committed or been a participant to the crime. Can the prosecution be compelled to prosecute B?" In 1968, the Divisional Court of Queen's Bench consisting of Lord Widgery C.J., Stevenson and Brabin JJ, decided that "to prosecute must indisputably be a matter of discretion." The judgment was affirmed by the Court of Appeal in autumn of 1972.

In 1972, he decided to pursue this matter into the Court of Appeal, which confirmed the 1968 judgment, in a separate matter of enforcement against the British Board of Film Censors and a cinema of the pornography laws then extant. The original Blackburn case in the 1968 Court of Queen's Bench dealt with Blackburn's allegations of a London illegal gambling establishment, whereas in Autumn 1972 the adjudication was in the Court of Appeal of Lord Denning, MR.

The case was noted as recently as the 1998 decision of the Lords Regina v. Chief Constable of Sussex Ex Parte International Trader's Ferry Limited 1998 UKHL 40, concerning police protection for the customers of ITF, a company involved in the export of livestock through the port of Shoreham, during the early months of 1995 when animal rights protesters were trying to stop the trade.

== Personal life ==
Blackburn married three times and had eight children. His first marriage was to Barbara Mary Robison in 1939. Together they had two sons and one daughter. Their marriage was dissolved in 1954. He was married to Marianne Ferguson from 1956 to 1959 when their marriage was dissolved. This was his only marriage to not produce children. His third and final marriage was to Tessa Hume in 1959. Their marriage ended on his death in 1991; she survived him. They had two sons and three daughters.

Blackburn died on 3 November 1991, aged 76, at Charing Cross Hospital, London.

Parliament of the United Kingdom
Preceded by John Peto	Member of Parliament for Birmingham King's Norton; 1945–1950	Succeeded by Geoffrey Lloyd
New constituency	Member of Parliament for Birmingham Northfield; 1950–1951	Succeeded by Donald Chapman
