= Lincoln Evans =

Welsh trade unionist

Sir Lincoln Evans CBE (18 September 1889 – 3 August 1970) was a Welsh trade unionist.

Born in Swansea, Evans left school at the age of twelve to work for a butcher, moving to several other jobs before, age seventeen, finding a post at a tin plate works. There, he joined the British Steel Smelters Association. This became part of the Iron and Steel Trades Confederation (ISTC) and, in 1936, Evans was elected as its Assistant General Secretary.

In 1945, Evans was elected to the General Council of the Trades Union Congress (TUC), where he worked closely with Arthur Deakin, Will Lawther and Tom Williamson to form a right-wing group strongly opposed to Marxism. He also chaired the TUC's economic committee. He attended the World Trade Union Conference that same year.

Evans was elected as General Secretary of the ISTC in 1946, and also took a place on the Iron and Steel Board. Two years later, he left the Iron and Steel Board to join the Economic Planning Board, and in 1952, he also became vice-chairman of the British Productivity Council. The following year, he resigned all his existing posts, and accepted a knighthood from the Conservative Prime Minister. He then became the full-time deputy chairman of the Iron and Steel Board. This was highly controversial, as the role now involved assisting the Conservative government in privatising the Iron and Steel Corporation of Great Britain, contrary to the policy of his former union.

Evans largely retired in 1960, but remained a part-time member of the Iron and Steel Board until his death in 1970.

Trade union offices
Preceded by John Hodge	President of the Iron and Steel Trades Confederation; 1931–1932	Succeeded by Tom Pugh
Preceded by John Brown	Assistant General Secretary of the Iron and Steel Trades Confederation; 1936–1946	Succeeded by Harry Douglass
Preceded by John Brown	General Secretary of the Iron and Steel Trades Confederation; 1946–1953	Succeeded by Harry Douglass
Preceded by John Brown and William Kean	Iron, Steel and Minor Metal Trades representative on the General Council of the TUC; 1945–1952; With: Ambrose Callighan (1945–1946); Jack Owen (1946–1952)	Succeeded by Harry Douglass and Joseph O'Hagan
Preceded by Herbert Bullock and William Harold Hutchinson	Trades Union Congress representative to the American Federation of Labour; 1949; With: Tom Williamson	Succeeded by Florence Hancock and Will Lawther
