= Amalgamated Malleable Ironworkers of Great Britain =

Former trade union of the United Kingdom

The Amalgamated Malleable Ironworkers of Great Britain was a trade union representing ironworkers in Great Britain.

The union was founded by John Kane in 1862 as the Amalgamated Malleable Ironworkers. Kane became its first president and editor of its journal, which was initially known as Sons of Vulcan. He built membership up to 6,500, largely based in the north of England. In 1866, the union led a strike in opposition to pay cuts of between 10 and 60%. The strike was defeated after twenty weeks, and membership of the union fell to under 500.

Undeterred by the near-collapse of the union, Kane convinced the remaining members to adopt a new constitution and a "of Great Britain" to the name of the union. He was elected as general secretary, and was able to rapidly increase membership, which reached 14,000 by 1871, and peaked at 35,000 in 1873. However, after this date, it faced increased competition, particular in Wales, where almost all of its members defected to the rival Independent Association of Tinplate Makers. Membership began to fall, particularly after Kane's death in 1876; it was only 5,000 in 1878, and just 1,200 in 1884.

In an attempt to recruit more members, the union changed its rules in the 1880s, admitting steelworkers, and paying unemployment benefits, but this had little impact. Instead, general secretary Edward Trow founded a new union, the Associated Iron and Steel Workers of Great Britain. Most members of Malleable Ironworkers switched to the new union, the old union being formally merged in to the Associated Iron and Steel Workers in 1892.

== General Secretaries ==
1868: John Kane
1876: Edward Trow

== Presidents ==
1862: John Kane
1868: ?
1872: Edward Trow
1874: William Aucott
1877: ?
