= Amalgamated Society of Steel and Iron Workers of Great Britain =

Former trade union of the United Kingdom

The Amalgamated Society of Steel and Iron Workers of Great Britain was a trade union representing workers in iron- and steelworks, principally in Scotland.

The union was founded in Glasgow in 1888 and was originally named the Associated Society of Millmen. John Hodge of the British Steel Smelters Association (BSSA) acted as the union's first secretary, but he stood down a year later, when members elected their own representative, John Cronin.

The union grew rapidly, despite charging new members a one-off fee of 5 shillings, membership reaching 3,000 by 1892, but most members were not fully paid up, and finances were an ongoing problem. In addition, Cronin was jailed in 1889 following trouble at a dispute in Clydebridge.

In 1895, the union changed its name to the "Amalgamated Society of Steel and Iron Workers" in the hope of attracting members from ironworks. It also began unionising blastfurnacemen, while in 1900, an organisation of nut, bolt and tube makers merged in. This took membership over 10,000, although it fell again during the 1900s, and a merger with the BSSA was discussed in 1911. It joined the Iron and Steel Trades Federation, founded in 1913, but not the more formal British Iron, Steel and Kindred Trades Association (BISAKTA) of 1917. However, a new vote in 1920 went in favour of joining BISAKTA, and it did so.

== General Secretaries ==
1888: John Hodge
1889: John Cronin
1902: Hugh Munro (acting)
1903: James Gavin
1917: Owen Coyle
