= National Steel Workers' Associated Engineering and Labour League =

- Merged into: Iron and Steel Trades Confederation
- Founded: June 1888
- Dissolved: 1917
- Headquarters: Horwell House, Harrogate Hill, Darlington
- Location: England
- Members: 3,000 (1917)
- Key people: George Beadle (Gen Sec)
- Affiliations: TUC, Labour Party

The National Steel Workers' Associated Engineering and Labour League was a trade union representing steel workers in England.

The union was founded in Middlesbrough in 1888, following an unsuccessful strike regarding wages at the Britannia Works. The leaders of the strike were victimised and, led by George Beadle, they formed a union. By 1891, it had a solid base in the north east of England, and decided to also begin recruiting steel workers in Sheffield. One of its first members there was Moses Humberstone, who later became president of the union.

By 1895, the union had 1,000 members, and this rose to 2,000 by 1913, and more than 3,000 by 1917. It was an early affiliate of the Labour Representation Committee, which later became the Labour Party.

The union affiliated to the loose Iron and Steel Trades Federation in 1913, and in 1917, it merged into the Iron and Steel Trades Confederation.
