= William Aucott =

British trade unionist (1830–1915)

William Aucott (20 July 1830 – 27 December 1915) was a British trade unionist.

Born in Hinckley in Leicestershire, Aucott was prevented from attending school as his father was a Chartist and a Methodist. Instead, he worked from home making stockings and taught himself to read. When he was sixteen, he moved to Wednesbury, where he found work at John Bagnall and Sons as an assistant puddler. Four years later, he married his manager's daughter, and was working as a sub-contractor, being paid on a piecework basis by the manager, while paying his assistants himself.

Despite his position in the firm, Aucott was a supporter of trade unionism and encouraged other workers to sign up. He began working for a variety of local ironworks, and became a well-known figure in the district. Always a supporter of temperance, his friendship with the Methodist minister Arthur O'Neill encouraged him to take up other radical causes, and he regularly spoke in support of Radical candidates in election in Wednesbury.

In 1863, Aucott was a founder of the Associated Ironworkers of Great Britain, a union for puddlers, based in Brierley Hill. This collapsed five years later, but Aucott followed many of its members in transferring to the national Amalgamated Malleable Ironworkers of Great Britain. In 1872, he joined the South Staffordshire Iron Trade Conciliation Board, an activity championed by the Malleable Ironworkers, sitting as one of twelve union representatives, and he was elected as the union's president in 1874. When agreements over pay collapsed in 1875, many puddlers in the area went on an unofficial strike, and ignored Aucott's requests to return to work.

Aucott was a leading figure in creating a new wages board, established in 1876, chaired by Joseph Chamberlain, with Aucott as the vice-chair. However, he became increasingly frustrated with the difficulties of organising workers in the industry and, in 1877, resigned all his trade union posts to become the superintendent at the Wednesbury Corporation Baths. Despite this, he remained in contact with leading figures in the union movement, and in 1887 was elected as the first president of the new Associated Iron and Steel Workers of Great Britain union. Two years later, he resigned from the baths to become the full-time secretary of the Midland Iron and Steel Wages Board. Through this, he frequently attended Trades Union Congress meetings, and supported the establishment of wages boards in other areas of the UK and elsewhere in Europe.

Aucott became a magistrate in 1893, and retired from his position on the wages board in 1907.
