= 1941 Birmingham King's Norton by-election =

UK Parliamentary by-election

The 1941 Birmingham King's Norton by-election was held on 8 May 1941. The by-election was held due to the death of the incumbent Conservative MP, Ronald Cartland, who was killed on active service during the Dunkirk evacuation. It was won by the Conservative candidate John Peto.

Birmingham King's Norton by-election, 1941
Party	Candidate	Votes	%	±%
Conservative	John Peto	21,573	86.9	+30.1
Independent	A. W. L. Smith	1,696	6.8	New
Pacifist	Stuart Morris	1,552	6.3	New
Majority		19,877	80.1	+66.5
Turnout		24,821	35.0	−39.6
Conservative hold		Swing		
