= Tin and Sheet Millmen's Association =

Former trade union of the United Kingdom

The Tin and Sheet Millmen's Association was a trade union representing millmen in the metalworking industry in the United Kingdom.

== History ==
The union was founded in 1899 following the collapse of the Independent Association of Tinplate Makers. In contrast to the earlier union, it did not represent tinhousemen, but it nonetheless immediately recruited more than 1,000 members. These included members of the South Wales, Monmouth and Gloucester Tinplate Workers' Union which merged into the new organisation, its secretary Thomas Philips becoming president of the Tin and Sheet Millmen.

The British Steel Smelters Association repeatedly asked the Millmen to merge with it, but demarcation disputes led to distrust between the two, and this was only partly improved with the formation of the loose Iron and Steel Trades Federation in 1913. The union balloted its members on a possible merger into the new British Iron, Steel and Kindred Trades Association, but this was rejected. However, in 1921, the union did merge into it.

== Election results ==
The union affiliated to the Labour Party, and sponsored its general secretary as a candidate in the 1918 UK general election.

Constituency	Candidate	Votes	%	Position
Pembrokeshire	Ivor Gwynne	7,712	28.0	2

== General Secretaries ==
1899: Thomas Philips
1904: Ivor Gwynne

== Presidents ==
1899: Ivor Gwynne
1906: M. Griffiths
