= Dai Davies (trade unionist) =

Welsh trade unionist (1909–1998)

Dai Davies OBE
- Born: David Henry Davies; December 1, 1909; Beaufort, Ebbw Vale Wales
- Died: April 2, 1998 (aged 88)
- Other name: Sir Dai Davies
- Occupations: Trade unionist, Labour Party official
- Known for: General Secretary of the Iron and Steel Trades Confederation (1967–1975); Chairman of the Labour Party (1962–1963); Treasurer of the Labour Party (1965–1967)
- Political party: Labour Party
- Awards: Knight Bachelor (1973)

Sir David Henry Davies (1 December 1909 – 2 April 1998), known as Dai Davies, was a Welsh trade unionist and Labour Party official. He served as General Secretary of the Iron and Steel Trades Confederation from 1967 to 1975 and held the positions of Chairman of the Labour Party from 1962 to 1963 and Treasurer from 1965 to 1967.

== Early life and career ==
Davies was born in Beaufort, Ebbw Vale, and worked in the local steel industry before joining the Iron and Steel Trades Confederation.

== Trade union career ==
In 1953, Davies was appointed Assistant General Secretary of the Iron and Steel Trades Confederation, working under General Secretary Harry Douglass. He succeeded Douglass as General Secretary in 1967, holding the position until 1975.

During his tenure as General Secretary, the British steel industry was nationalised in 1967 under the Labour government, creating the British Steel Corporation. The Iron and Steel Act 1967 brought about 90% of British steelmaking into public ownership.

Davies also served as the Iron, Steel and Minor Metal Trades representative on the General Council of the Trades Union Congress from 1967 to 1975.

== Labour Party positions ==
Davies served as Chairman of the Labour Party from 1962 to 1963. He subsequently held the position of Treasurer of the Labour Party from 1965 to 1967. In 1967, James Callaghan succeeded Davies as treasurer, defeating Michael Foot in the election for the position.

== Honours ==
Davies was appointed a Knight Bachelor in the 1973 New Year Honours.

== Death ==
Davies died on 2 April 1998, aged 88.

Party political offices
Preceded by Harold Wilson	Chair of the Labour Party; 1962–1963	Succeeded by Anthony Greenwood
Preceded by Harry Nicholas	Treasurer of the Labour Party; 1965–1967	Succeeded by James Callaghan
Trade union offices
Preceded by Harry Douglass	Assistant General Secretary of the Iron and Steel Trades Confederation; 1953–1967	Succeeded by Jim Diamond
Preceded by Harry Douglass	General Secretary of the Iron and Steel Trades Confederation; 1967–1975	Succeeded by Bill Sirs
Preceded by Harry Douglass	Iron, Steel and Minor Metal Trades representative on the General Council of the TUC; 1967 – 1975	Succeeded by Bill Sirs
