= Jack Owen (trade unionist) =

British trade unionist (1890–1983)

He should not be confused with Jack Owen (1887–1957) who was also a British trade unionist.

Jack Owen (c.1890 – 22 October 1983) was a British trade unionist.

Born in Scarborough, North Yorkshire, Owen worked as a blastfurnaceman in a foundry for twenty-five years. He joined the National Union of Blastfurnacemen, Ore Miners, Coke Workers and Kindred Trades (NUB), and began working full-time for the union in 1937.

In 1948, Owen was elected as general secretary of the NUB, and also to the General Council of the Trades Union Congress. He retired in 1953, and wrote Ironmen, a history of the union.

Owen died at the age of 93 in 1983.

Trade union offices
Preceded by Ambrose Callighan	General Secretary of the National Union of Blastfurnacemen; 1948 – 1953	Succeeded by Joseph O'Hagan
Preceded by Ambrose Callighan and Lincoln Evans	Iron, Steel and Minor Metal Trades representative on the General Council of the TUC; 1948 – 1953; With: Lincoln Evans	Succeeded by Harry Douglass and Joseph O'Hagan
