= National Union of Blastfurnacemen =

Former trade union of the United Kingdom

NUB
- National Union of Blastfurnacemen, Ore Miners, Coke Workers and Kindred Trades
- Merged into: Iron and Steel Trades Confederation
- Founded: 1888
- Dissolved: 1985
- Headquarters: 93 Borough Road West, Middlesbrough
- Location: United Kingdom
- Members: 25,000 (1918)
- Key people: Joseph O'Hagan (General President)
- Affiliations: TUC, Labour

The National Union of Blastfurnacemen, Ore Miners, Coke Workers and Kindred Trades (NUB) was a trade union in England and Wales which existed between 1888 and 1985. It represented process workers in the British iron and steel industry.

== History ==
Prior to the formation of the union, blastfurnacemen had been represented by the Associated Iron and Steel Workers of Great Britain, but this organisation concerned itself primarily with the puddlers. In response, the Cleveland-based blastfurnacemen split away to form the "Cleveland Blastfurnacemen's Association" in 1878, followed in 1887 by a split in Cumberland. These two unions merged the following year to form the first National Association of Blastfurnacemen, which rapidly spread across the country.

The union was re-founded in 1892 in Workington as the National Federation of Blastfurnacemen, with membership reaching 6,773 in 1898, then continuing a slow growth. In 1904, the organisation of the union devoted itself to organising in Cleveland and South Durham, while a new national federation of the same name was founded the following year, and the old union affiliated to it. In 1909, it was renamed as the National Federation of Blastfurnacemen, Ore Miners and Kindred Trades, and membership topped 25,000 by 1918. In 1921, the members of the federation united to form a single union, the "National Union of Blastfurnacemen, Ore Miners, Coke Workers and Kindred Trades".

The union suffered a lengthy decline in membership, exacerbated by the closure of many foundries. By 1980, membership had fallen to less than 14,000, and it developed a close working relationship with the Iron and Steel Trades Confederation (ISTC), which already organised blast furnace workers in Scotland. In 1985, the NUB merged into the ISTC.

== Election results ==
The union sponsored a Labour Party candidate in several Parliamentary elections.

Election	Constituency	Candidate	Votes	Percentage	Position
1918 general election	Middlesbrough	Patrick Walls	2,710	14.2	3
1922 general election	Newark	Henry Nixon	8,378	35.2	2
1923 general election	The Wrekin	Henry Nixon	11,657	53.2	1
1924 general election	The Wrekin	Henry Nixon	11,132	44.4	2
1929 general election	Gloucester	Henry Nixon	10,548	37.4	2
1955 general election	Tynemouth	James Finegan	20,113	35.8	2
1964 general election	Cleveland	James Tinn	28,596	44.6	1
1966 general election	Cleveland	James Tinn	34,303	53.6	1
1970 general election	Cleveland	James Tinn	36,213	53.8	1
Feb 1974 general election	Redcar	James Tinn	28,252	59.8	1
Oct 1974 general election	Redcar	James Tinn	23,204	53.9	1
1979 general election	Redcar	James Tinn	25,470	53.7	1
1983 general election	Redcar	James Tinn	18,348	40.6	1

== Leadership ==
=== General Secretaries ===
1889: William Snow
1892: Patrick Walls
1917: Thomas McKenna
1939: Ambrose Callighan
1948: Jack Owen
1953: Joseph O'Hagan
1968: James Barry
1970: Hector Smith
1982: Nick Leadley

=== General Presidents ===
1921: Henry Nixon
1939: Ambrose Callighan
1939: Harry France
1948: Joseph O'Hagan
1953–1959: Thomas Walsh
