= Roy Evans (trade unionist) =

British trade unionist (1931–2015)

Roy Lyon Evans OBE (13 August 1931 – 3 December 2015) was a British trade unionist.

Born in Pontarddulais in Wales, Evans' first years were spent speaking only Welsh. His father died when he was seven years old, after which he and his mother moved to Gorseinon. He was educated at Gowerton Grammar School, leaving at the age of sixteen to work in a tin mill.

Evans completed National Service with the Royal Air Force and joined both the Labour Party and the Iron and Steel Trades Confederation (ISTC). In 1963, he was appointed as the full-time North West regional organiser, moving to cover West Wales before he was appointed as Deputy General Secretary in 1973, then Assistant General Secretary in 1975. He was the leading figure in the union's strike of 1980, which achieved a 16% pay rise for members. The following year, he was elected to the National Executive Committee (NEC) of the Labour Party, on which he voted not to back Peter Tatchell as a candidate, and opposed the Militant Tendency. As a result of this and his opposition to the UK miners' strike, he lost his NEC seat in 1984.

In 1985, Evans was elected as the union's General Secretary, defeating Keith Jones. He also won election to the General Council of the Trades Union Congress. He opposed the privatisation of British Steel Corporation, but felt that industrial action would not prevent it, and so took no action. Retiring in 1993, he described job losses under his leadership as having "decimated" the industry.

Evans was made an Officer of the Order of the British Empire on his retirement, and returned to live in Wales with his wife.

Trade union offices
Preceded by Bill Sirs	Assistant General Secretary of the Iron and Steel Trades Confederation; 1975 – 1985	Succeeded by Keith Brookman
Preceded by Bill Sirs	General Secretary of the Iron and Steel Trades Confederation; 1985 – 1993	Succeeded by Keith Brookman
