= Joseph O'Hagan =

British trade union leader (1900–1978)

Joseph O'Hagan (18 March 1900 – 22 December 1978), often known as Joe O'Hagan, was a British trade union leader.

Born in Workington, O'Hagan started work at the age of fourteen for the United Steel Companies, and immediately joined the National Federation of Blastfurnacemen, Ore Miners and Kindred Trades (NUB). He was successful, becoming a blastfurnace keeper before he took up full-time union work in 1939.

O'Hagan took on a succession of roles in the union, becoming General President in 1948, and then, in 1953, General Secretary, serving until his retirement in 1968. In 1958, he was made an officer of the Order of the British Empire.

O'Hagan served on the Iron and Steel Industrial Training Board and the National Safety Committee, and was a delegate to the International Labour Conference. He was also elected to the General Council of the Trades Union Congress (TUC) in 1954, and served as the President of the TUC in 1966.

After leaving his union duties, O'Hagan served as a director of British Steel Corporation's General Steels section until his final retirement in 1971.

Trade union offices
Preceded by Harry France	General President of the National Union of Blastfurnacemen; 1948–1953	Succeeded by Thomas Walsh
Preceded by Jack Owen	General Secretary of the National Union of Blastfurnacemen; 1953–1968	Succeeded by James Barry
Preceded by Lincoln Evans and Jack Owen	Iron, Steel and Minor Metal Trades representative on the General Council of the TUC; 1953 – 1966; With: Harry Douglass	Succeeded by Harry Douglass
Preceded by Harold Collison	President of the Trades Union Congress; 1966	Succeeded by Harry Douglass
Preceded by Jim Campbell and Tom Eccles	Trades Union Congress representative to the AFL-CIO; 1959; With: Wilfred Beard	Succeeded by Frank Cousins and Frederick Hayday
