= John Kane (trade unionist) =

British trade unionist

John Kane (18 July 1819 – 21 March 1876) was a British trade unionist.

== Life ==
Born in Alnwick in Northumberland, Kane became an orphan when he was young and, as a result, left school at the age of seven to work in a tobacco factory. Two years later, he was able to return to school, where he spent three further years in education, before becoming an apprentice gardener. At the age of seventeen, the head gardener ordered all his staff to give a celebratory welcome to the landowner, but Kane refused, and was beaten. He left, moving to Gateshead, and found employment at an ironworks.

In Gateshead, Kane became interested in trade unionism, and founded a short-lived ironworkers' union in 1842. Its collapse, later in the year, discouraged his workmates from future attempts at forming an association. Kane remained keen, even as he gained promotions at work, to become a roller.

Around 1850, Kane began collaborating with Joseph Cowen, who shared support for Chartism and the Revolutions of 1848. He was a founder member of Cowen's Northern Reform Union, and was a leading supporter of P. A. Taylor, its candidate in the 1859 UK general election. During the 1850s, he was also active in the Working Men's Reading Room, Northern Working Men's Permissive Bill Association and Gateshead Ratepayers' Association, and was a founder of the Cramlington Co-operative Society.

In 1862, Kane's agitation for a trade union was finally successful. Branches were formed at works across Gateshead, and Kane was elected president of the new National Association of Ironworkers. Kane travelled around the North of England to help establish branches in other cities, and the union grew until 1864, when its members in Leeds were locked out by employers. Members held out for twenty-seven weeks, but eventually had to admit defeat, and Kane was sacked by his own employer for his part in the union.

Kane now devoted his whole time to the union, temporarily moving to Walsall in an attempt to gain new members there, and trying to make agreements with the rival Associated Ironworkers of Great Britain union. He attended the "Junta"'s trade union conference of 1867, and the founding conference of the Trades Union Congress (TUC) in 1868, serving on the Parliamentary Committee of the TUC from 1871, and as its chairman in 1875.

In 1868, the National Association was reorganised as the "Amalgamated Malleable Ironworkers of Great Britain". Kane now became its general secretary, and editor of its newspaper, the Ironworkers' Journal. He worked with David Dale to form a board of arbitration. With the Associated Ironworkers dissolving, the reorganised union grew to 14,000 members by 1871, and 35,000 two years later, although it then went into a rapid decline, as there was a general downturn in the industry. The union headquarters moved to Darlington, and Kane also moved to the town, where he became active in local politics and stood as the Labour Representation League's candidate for Middlesbrough at the 1874 UK general election. He took second place, but was well behind the winning Liberal Party candidate Henry Bolckow.

In 1876, Kane died suddenly in Birmingham. His son, W. B. Kane, stood in the election to replace him as general secretary, but was not elected.

Trade union offices
Preceded by New position	General Secretary of the Amalgamated Malleable Ironworkers of Great Britain; 1868 – 1876	Succeeded by Edward Trow
Preceded by Robert Knight	Chairman of the Parliamentary Committee of the Trades Union Congress; 1875 – 1876	Succeeded by John D. Prior
