= Iron and Steel Board =

- Company type: Government body
- Industry: Iron and Steel
- Founded: 1946 and 1953
- Founder: Ministry of Supply
- Defunct: 1948 and 1967
- Fate: Abolished under nationalisation
- Headquarters: London
- Area served: United Kingdom
- Key people: See text
- Number of employees: about 100

The Iron and Steel Board was a governmental body, originally established in 1946, to supervise the work and development of the United Kingdom iron and steel industry. It was reestablished in 1953 and was abolished in 1967.

== Iron and Steel Board 1946-48 ==
In 1946 the Labour government established an Iron and Steel Board to control the price of raw materials, finished products, and steel imports; and to regulate investment, pooling arrangements, and the development of new plant and equipment. Board members were appointed by the Minister of Supply and represented industry employers, workers and consumers.

=== Personnel ===
The Board originally comprised:

- Sir Archibald Forbes (chairman)
- Sir Alan Barlow
- A. Callighan
- Sir Lincoln Evans
- G. H. Latham
- R. Mather
- Sir Wilfred Ayre
- A. C. Boddis (secretary)

The Board was staffed by about 100 civil servants from the Ministry of Supply.

=== Nationalisation ===
The Board received little cooperation from the British Iron and Steel Federation. In October 1948 in light of the changed circumstances likely to arise from the government's nationalisation proposals five of the board members, with the exception of the trade unionists, refused a further term of office. As a consequence, the Board nominally ceased to exist from 1 October 1948. The work of the Board continued within the Ministry of Supply.

The Labour government nationalised the iron and steel industry. This was enacted by the Iron and Steel Act 1949. The Iron and Steel Bill included provisions for the establishment of a National Iron and Steel Board. During the passage of the Bill through Parliament the proposed Iron and Steel Board became the Iron and Steel Corporation.

== Iron and Steel Board 1953-67 ==
The Conservative government denationalised the iron and steel industry under the provisions of the Iron and Steel Act 1953. The 1953 Act established a new Iron and Steel Board which began operating on 13 July 1953. The Board had a duty 'to exercise a general supervision over the iron and steel industry... with a view to promoting the efficient, economic and adequate supply, under competitive conditions, of iron and steel products'. There were criticisms of work of the Board, its powers were sufficient when iron and steel were in short supply. However, when iron and steel became plentiful in the late 1950s the board's powers to set maximum prices and to veto development became meaningless. However, the ‘toothless tiger’ suited the steelmasters.

=== Personnel ===
The 1953 Act prescribed that the Board should comprise not less than 10 and not more than 15 members. They were appointed by the Minister of Supply. In 1953 the Board initially comprised:

- Sir Archibald Forbes (chairman)
- Sir Lincoln Evans (vice-chairman)
- Robert Shone
- Sir Andrew McCancy
- Neville Rollason
- James Owen
- Wilfred Beard
- James Shaw
- Charles Connell
- Sir Percy Lister
- George Beharrell

Sir Cyril Musgrave became chairman on 1 March 1959 upon the retirement of Sir Archibald Forbes.

Other staff included: Sir Robert Shone, executive member (1955-62); J. Grieve-Smith, head of the economics division (1962-63); W. Taplin and Dr R. Robson, chief economists/senior economic advisors (1955-58); H. McArthur, head of finance/prices (1955-57); R.W. Foad, director of finance (1954-59).

=== Ministerial responsibility ===
In 1955 ministerial responsibility for the industry, including the Board, passed from the Ministry of Supply to the Board of Trade. In 1957 responsibility passed to the Ministry of Power.

=== Dissolution ===
In 1965 the Labour government announced plans to nationalise the iron and steel industry. The Iron and Steel Act 1967 vested the industry in the British Steel Corporation and the Iron and Steel Board was abolished.

== Records ==
The records of the Iron and Steel Board are held at the National Archives, reference BE 1; and at the Modern Records Centre.

== See also ==
- Iron and Steel Corporation of Great Britain
- British Iron and Steel Federation
- British Steel Corporation
- History of the steel industry (1850–1970)
