= Sirs =

Sirs is a surname. Notable people with the surname include:

- Bill Sirs (1920–2015), British trade unionist
- Judith Sirs (born 1954), British swimmer
