= Iron and Steel Trades Confederation =

Former trade union of the United Kingdom

- Merged into: Community
- Founded: 1 January 1917
- Dissolved: 2004
- Headquarters: Swinton House, Gray's Inn Road, London
- Location: United Kingdom
- Members: 110,000 (1978)
- Publication: ISTC Banner
- Affiliations: TUC, CSEU, Labour, STUC
- Website: www.istc-tu.org

The Iron and Steel Trades Confederation (ISTC) was a British trade union for metal-workers and allied groups, being the largest union in these fields. It was formed on 1 January 1917 as a merger of existing steel-workers' unions and it is now part of Community.

== History ==
In 1917 Minister of Labour, John Hodge passed the Trade Unions' Amalgamation Act, which simplified the process whereby Trade Unions merged, amalgamated or federated. This was in response to both the difficulty of mergers under the previous legislation (requiring two-thirds majorities in favor in all participant unions), as well as a desire to push craft unions into general trade unions to cover entire industries. However, difficulties still remained. When the first three members federated in 1917, they were legally prevented from accepting any new members. The ISTC focused on industrial negotiations, and new members joined its subsidiary, the British Iron, Steel and Kindred Trades Association (BISAKTA); formally, unions which federated after 1917 joined this association.

Trade unions that have amalgamated with or transferred engagements to the ISTC or BISAKTA and year it occurred:

- British Steel Smelters, Mill, Iron and Tinplate Workers Union (1917)
- Associated Iron and Steel Workers of Great Britain (1917)
- National Steel Workers' Associated Engineering and Labour League (1917)
- Amalgamated Society of Steel and Iron Workers of Great Britain (1920)
- Tin and Sheet Millmen's Association (1921)
- Wire Workers Union (1922–24, 1991)
- National Union of Blastfurnacemen (1985)
- Power Loom Carpet Weavers and Textile Workers Union (2000)
- National League of the Blind and Disabled (2000)

The resultant union was named the Iron and Steel Trades Confederation. Members of the Amalgamated Association of Steel and Iron Workers of Great Britain and of the Tin and Sheet Millmens' Association voted against joining the union, but were later reballoted and voted in favour. The Wire Workers Union joined the confederation in 1922 but left in 1924, rejoining in 1991. Other members left in 1924 to form the Constructional Engineering Union.

From the 1980s, employment in the metalworking trades was in sharp decline, and membership of the ISTC dropped in line with this. In 1984, the existing ISTC was legally absorbed by BISAKTA, which took on the ISTC name.

In later years the union also built up representation amongst workers in the electronics industry, plastics and glass, the manufacture of kitchen furniture, carpet production, and call centres. Expansion was especially strong in areas with major steel industry installations.

Responding to the contraction of the British manufacturing sector, the ISTC expanded into new areas in 2000. Both the NLBD and PLCWTWU pre-dating the ISTC having been formed as a trade union in 1899 and 1866 respectively.

In 2004, the ISTC merged with the National Union of Knitwear, Footwear & Apparel Trades (KFAT) to form a new organisation called Community.

== Election results ==
The union sponsored Labour Party candidates in each Parliamentary election.

Election	Constituency	Candidate	Votes	Percentage	Position
1918 general election	Kidderminster	John Baker	9,760	42.0	2
1918 general election	Manchester Gorton	John Hodge	13,047	67.4	1
1918 general election	Pontypool	Thomas Griffiths	8,348	38.8	1
1918 general election	Rotherham	James Walker	9,757	38.1	2
1922 general election	Bilston	John Baker	10,392	45.8	2
1922 general election	Manchester Gorton	John Hodge	15,058	53.6	1
1922 general election	Pontypool	Thomas Griffiths	11,198	40.6	1
1922 general election	Rotherham	James Walker	16,449	49.0	2
1922 general election	Walsall	Robert Dennison	8,946	23.6	3
1923 general election	Bilston	John Baker	9,085	37.1	2
1923 general election	Cleveland	Robert Dennison	9,683	27.8	3
1923 general election	Pontypool	Thomas Griffiths	13,770	50.6	1
1924 general election	Bilston	John Baker	14,583	53.2	1
1924 general election	Birmingham King's Norton	Robert Dennison	10,497	43.3	1
1924 general election	Pontypool	Thomas Griffiths	15,378	52.6	1
1929 general election	Bilston	John Baker	18,679	50.8	1
1929 general election	Birmingham King's Norton	Robert Dennison	13,973	40.6	2
1929 general election	Eccles	David Mort	20,489	49.8	1
1929 general election	Newport	James Walker	18,653	39.5	1
1929 general election	Pontypool	Thomas Griffiths	17,805	51.5	1
1931 general election	Bilston	John Baker	16,847	44.9	2
1931 general election	Eccles	David Mort	16,101	38.2	2
1931 general election	Newport	James Walker	19,238	40.9	2
1931 general election	Pontypool	Thomas Griffiths	18,981	56.3	1
1935 general election	Bilston	David Mort	17,820	48.8	2
1935 general election	Motherwell	James Walker	14,755	50.7	1
1940 by-election	Swansea East	David Mort	unopposed	N/A	1
1945 general election	Bolton	Jack Jones	44,595	24.0	1
1945 general election	Swansea East	David Mort	19,127	75.8	1
1950 general election	Rotherham	Jack Jones	31,211	64.4	1
1950 general election	Swansea East	David Mort	32,680	75.3	1
1951 general election	Rotherham	Jack Jones	31,124	65.6	1
1951 general election	Swansea East	David Mort	32,790	73.6	1
1955 general election	Rotherham	Jack Jones	27,423	63.3	1
1955 general election	Swansea East	David Mort	28,198	72.4	1
1959 general election	Rotherham	Jack Jones	28,298	62.8	1
1959 general election	Swansea East	David Mort	29,884	67.5	1
1964 general election	Neath	Donald Coleman	29,692	73.4	1
1966 general election	Neath	Donald Coleman	31,183	79.9	1
1968 by-election	Sheffield Brightside	Edward Griffiths	14,179	55.2	1
1970 general election	Neath	Donald Coleman	28,378	71.4	1
1970 general election	Sheffield Brightside	Edward Griffiths	23,941	72.2	1
Feb 1974 general election	Halesowen and Stourbridge	Dennis Turner	22,465	33.8	2
Feb 1974 general election	Neath	Donald Coleman	25,351	62.3	1
Feb 1974 general election	Sheffield Brightside	Edward Griffiths	27,363	68.4	1
Oct 1974 general election	Halesowen and Stourbridge	Dennis Turner	23,637	37.6	2
Oct 1974 general election	Neath	Donald Coleman	25,028	61.4	1
1979 general election	Kettering	William Homewood	31,579	45.0	1
1979 general election	Neath	Donald Coleman	27,071	64.5	1
1983 general election	Corby	William Homewood	17,659	36.1	2
1983 general election	Neath	Donald Coleman	22,670	53.6	1
1987 general election	Enfield North	Martin Upham	14,743	28.5	2
1987 general election	Neath	Donald Coleman	27,612	63.4	1
1987 general election	Newport West	Paul Flynn	20,887	46.1	1

== General Secretaries ==
1917: Arthur Pugh
1936: John Brown
1946: Lincoln Evans
1953: Harry Douglass
1967: Dai Davies
1975: Bill Sirs
1985: Roy Evans
1993: Keith Brookman
1999: Michael J. Leahy

== Assistant General Secretaries ==
1935: John Brown
1936: Lincoln Evans
1945: Harry Douglass
1953: Dai Davies
1967: Jim Diamond
1973: Bill Sirs
1975: Roy Evans
1985: Keith Brookman
1993: Michael J. Leahy
1999: Eddie Lynch
2004: Roy Rickhuss
