= Richard Beaumont-Thomas =

British businessman (1860-1917)

Richard Beaumont-Thomas (25 May 1860 – 14 February 1917) was the managing director of a major South Wales iron, steel and tinplate manufacturing company named Richard Thomas and Co Ltd, which eventually merged with Baldwins to become Richard Thomas and Baldwins.

== Biography ==
He was born on 25 May 1860 at Oxford, the eldest son of his father, tinplate manufacturer Richard Thomas. Richard Beaumont Thomas married Nora Anderson, the fourth daughter of James Anderson a Tea Merchant, of Dundee and Elizabeth Ann Downes at Holy Trinity Church, Tulse Hill, London on 2 August 1888.

Richard and Nora produced four children:

- Vera Nora Beaumont-Thomas (12 June 1889 – 24 November 1900)
- Colonel Lionel Beaumont-Thomas MC MP (1 August 1893 – 7 December 1942)
- Irene Murial Beaumont-Thomas (born 9 October 1894)
- Reginald Alexander Beaumont-Thomas (born 3 September 1903)

== Inventions ==
During 1885, assisted by Robert Davies, Richard Beaumont-Thomas invented a cleaning machine and a dusting machine. These machines made possible the continuous production of tinplate. Richard Beaumont-Thomas continued this inventive streak, in 1897 together with his brother Hubert Spence-Thomas, a continuous tinning machine was patented. The patents for these inventions were issued and utilised by the tinplate industry globally.

== Will ==
Richard Beaumont-Thomas died on 14 February 1917 leaving a will of £449,285-18-9 pounds sterling. The will, due to its complexity, was converted into a Private Bill, an Act of Parliament named the Beaumont Thomas Estate 1929 (19 & 20 Geo.5), read in the House of Lords.
