= Patrick Walls =

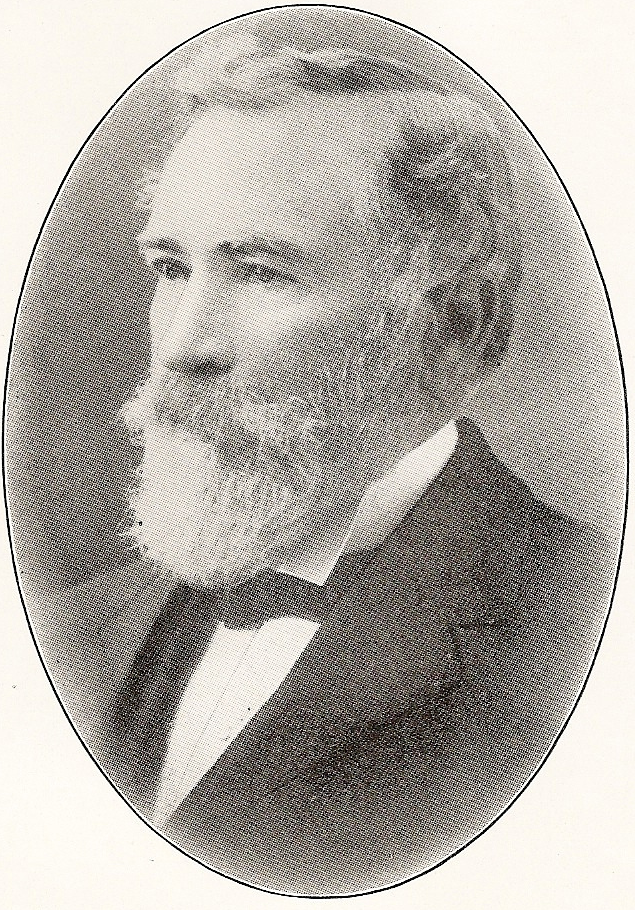
Patrick Walls, while secretary of the National Federation of Blastfurnacemen

Patrick Walls (1847 – 24 October 1932) was an Irish trade unionist.

Walls was born to a Catholic family in the northern part of Ireland during the worst of the Great Famine. He emigrated to Tyneside to work as a labourer, then moved to Middlesbrough, where he worked at Bell's Foundry as a blastfurnaceman for seventeen years. While there, he became active in the Associated Union of Iron Workers, and in 1878 supported the split which formed the Cleveland Blastfurnacemen's Association, serving as its president. In 1887, Walls was president of Middlesbrough Trades Council.

In 1887, William Snow, secretary of the blastfurnacemen's union in Cumberland, was incapacitated through illness, and Walls travelled to Workington in an attempt to resolve a dispute there. Following a fall in the price of iron, local employers had cut wages. Walls believed that the price of iron would quickly recover, and recommended that trade unionists accept a deal where they would receive a 5% reduction in pay if it did not recover, but no reduction if it did. As he hoped, the price rebounded within a week, and wages were restored to their earlier level. Following this success, the Cumberland blastfurnacemen joined with those of Cleveland to form a new National Union of Blastfurnacemen, and Walls led negotiations which agreed an eight-hour working day in 1890. In 1892, he was elected as general secretary of the union.

Walls relocated to Workington to take up his position. Long an opponent of the Liberal Party, he formed a Cumberland Labour Electoral Association in 1891, and was a founder member of the Independent Labour Party in 1893. He was elected to Workington Town Council in 1893, and to Cumberland County Council in 1901. At the January 1910 general election, he stood for the Labour Party in Middlesbrough, with the support of the ILP and the United Irish League, but was not elected. He also served on the National Executive Committee of the Labour Party for a few years.

Walls retired from his trade union posts in 1919, and died in 1932.

Trade union offices
Preceded by William Snow	Secretary of the National Federation of Blastfurnacemen; 1892 – 1917	Succeeded by Thomas McKenna
