= Lionel Beaumont-Thomas =

British Army officer and politician (1893-1942)

Colonel Lionel Beaumont-Thomas MC MP
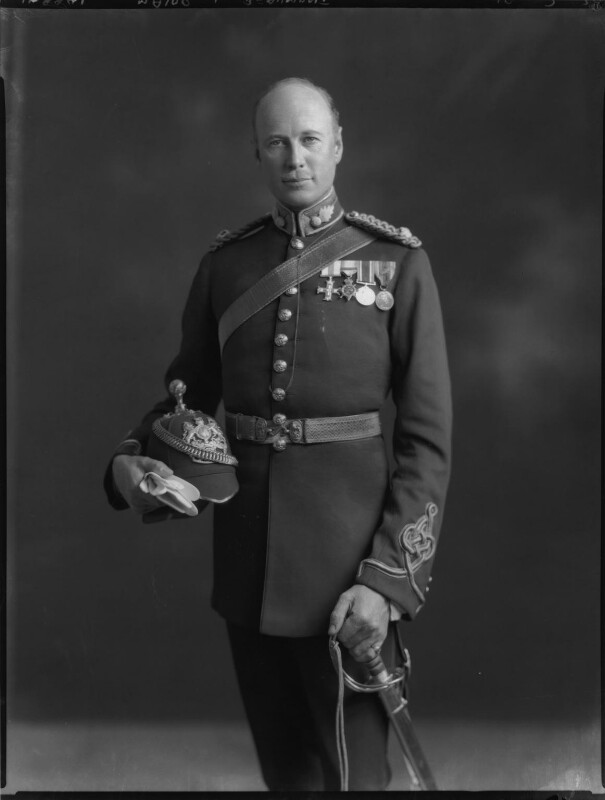

Member of Parliament for Birmingham King's Norton
- In office 14 November 1929 – 7 December 1935
- Preceded by: Robert Dennison
- Succeeded by: Ronald Cartland

Personal details
- Born: 1 August 1893 Lydney, Gloucestershire, England
- Died: 7 December 1942 (aged 49) Caribbean area, Atlantic Ocean
- Cause of death: Killed in action
- Party: Conservative
- Relations: Richard Beaumont-Thomas (father)
- Education: Rugby school
- Occupation: Businessman; British Army Officer; Conservative MP, King's Norton, Birmingham

Colonel Lionel Beaumont-Thomas MC (1 August 1893 – 7 December 1942) was a Welsh businessman, British Army officer and politician, who served as Conservative Member of Parliament for Birmingham King's Norton, from 1929 to 1935.

== Early life ==
The second child of industrialist Richard Beaumont-Thomas and his wife Nora Anderson, Lionel was born on 1 August 1893. Educated at Rugby school, on graduating in 1912 Lionel was commissioned as Second Lieutenant (Special Reserve) in The Royal Artillery. He then spent two years touring Europe, gaining knowledge of pig iron and steel production, particularly the ARBED steelworks in Luxembourg where he lived.

== World War I ==
On the outbreak of World War I, and now married, he was promoted to Lieutenant. Posted to the 14th Brigade, he served in the trenches. Promoted to captain, for three years from August 1915 to August 1918, Beaumont-Thomas was adjutant to the 14th Brigade of the Royal Horse Artillery. He served in the Battle of the Somme in July 1916, where the division in which he served held ground around the village of Mametz. In January 1917, he was awarded the Military Cross (MC) for holding a stretch of ground after two of his companions had been killed.

== Inter-war period ==
Promoted in June 1918, to Major in charge of the 76th Battery, Royal Field Artillery, he was tempted to stay on, but decided in light of the death of his father to rejoin the family business, Richard Thomas & Co Ltd. Rather than taking a board position, he took a working post to learn the business. He did however retain his military commission, appointed to command a Battery in the 83rd Welsh Brigade, the Territorial Army in Cardiff.

After resigning his commission in 1923, as well as his duties as Deputy Chairman of Richard Thomas & Co Ltd, he was a Justice of the Peace and a Conservative County Councillor in Herefordshire. In 1923, he also stood for Parliament unsuccessfully in Llanelli and in 1924, again unsuccessfully, for Pontypool.

== MP for Birmingham King's Norton ==
Beaumont-Thomas was adopted as the prospective parliamentary candidate for Birmingham King's Norton in 1925. He received great support from the ousted Conservative candidate of 1927, the car manufacturer and industrialist Herbert Austin, including the placement of posters in his Longbridge car factory which was located within the constituency.

Beaumont-Thomas was elected to the seat of Birmingham King's Norton in 1929, ousting Labour's Robert Dennison. He took part in his first debate on 24 March 1930, on disarmament. Two years later he showed his gratitude to his constituents, inviting 2,000 to tea at Lyons Corner House, followed by a tour of the Palace of Westminster. He arranged for the visit to be filmed, which is now stored in the BFI National Archive. However, after the breakdown of his marriage, in spring 1933 he wrote to Neville Chamberlain to say that he would be standing down "for reasons of health". He was subsequently divorced in late 1933, due to his affair with Iseult Margery Hazlehurst, whom he married the following year. His final debate was on 1 May 1935, on the subject of pedal cyclists.

He returned to working in the family business and became involved in an early lock or viaduct-based version of the Thames Barrier, to alleviate flooding of the lower reaches of the river.

== World War II ==
At the outbreak of war, Beaumont-Thomas signed up to be reactivated, although his health was graded B1. In part due to his fluency on French, he was appointed to the command of the enemy armaments intelligence branch at the Ministry of Economic Warfare, a post he held until May 1940. After serving as a general staff officer, he joined Military Intelligence, and in early 1941 attended an eight-week military politics course at Trinity College, Cambridge. Promoted to Colonel (Acting Lieutenant Colonel), he was to lead a mission proceeding to the Middle East.

In November 1942, at the height of the Battle of the Atlantic, Beaumont-Thomas left England as a passenger on the cargo ship Henry Stanley. She was to cross the Atlantic Ocean to the Caribbean, re-cross the Atlantic to Freetown, Sierra Leone, and then continue to Lagos. Beaumont-Thomas would then travel onwards to Gibraltar. She left Liverpool on 28 November 1942 with Convoy ON 149, which dispersed on 5 December.

On the night of 6–7 December German submarine U-103 sank Henry Stanley about 580 nautical miles (1,070 km) west of the Azores. All passengers and crew made it to the four lifeboats, and started rowing to the Azores. U-103 surfaced later that day, and after questioning the crew and passengers took the captain prisoner. That night a gale blew up. The u-boat commander, Oblt.z.S. Gustav-Adolf Janssen, tried to find the lifeboats, but in the heavy sea U-103's engine room shipped 0.5 metres (20 in) of water, forcing him to abandon the search. The gale continued for three days and nights. Nothing more was seen or heard of the four lifeboats and their crews, and it was presumed that they lost their lives in the storm: 44 crew, DEMS 8 gunners and 11 passengers.

After being assumed dead the following year, his name was inscribed on the Brookwood Memorial, together with 3,500 other men and women of the land forces of the Commonwealth who died in action during the Second World War and have no known grave.

His family later learnt that Beaumont-Thomas was en route to brief forces with regards the Battle of Crete, to recapture it from the Nazis. His enjoyment in being involved in such a mission was that at the time of his departure, his son Nigel was a Prisoner of War in Italy.

Released as the allies undertook the Italian Campaign, Nigel Beaumont-Thomas (17 April 1916 – 20 September 1944) was second in command of the 4th Parachute Squadron within the 1st Airborne Division, when they parachuted into Arnhem as part of Operation Market Garden, where he was killed in action.

== Personal life ==
On his tour he met Pauline Grace Marriott, the daughter of Sidney Frederick Marriott the Governor's Commissioner for Colo West, Fiji. A relationship disapproved of by his mother, the couple married in a Register office with the bride's mother was a witness. On visiting his mother, the couple told her of their marriage, and she insisted on them remarrying in a church, which they later did at Holy Trinity, Brompton. The couple lived at Great Brampton House, in Madley, Herefordshire, and had four children: Richard Lionel, Nigel, Paul and Pearl.

An affair with Welsh seamstress Nancy Turner (born 22 December 1899 in Canton, Cardiff – died April 1971 in Lemington Spa) daughter of Arthur Turner of Cardiff, bore him a son, Noel David Jeffries Turner (born 5 January 1920 at Whitchurch, Cardiff – died 22 December 1987 in Newport).

After he started a prolonged affair with Isuelt Marjery Bland daughter of Oscar Theodore Bland of Riversdale, Insinga, Rhodesia (born 6 March 1896 in Culworth, Northamptonshire – died 15 December 1987 in Yeovil, Somerset), at the time wife of Henry Edward Hazlehurst, Pauline divorced him in 1933. He married Iseult Hazlehurst on 5 January 1934 in Kensington, London.

== MY Llanthony ==
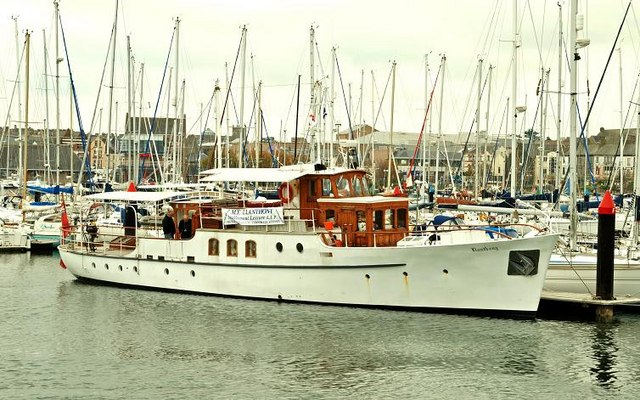
MY Llanthony at Bangor, Northern Ireland

After his divorce, in 1934 Beaumont Thomas commissioned Camper and Nicholsons to build him the motor yacht Llanthony. She was requisitioned in 1939 by the Admiralty, and after transfer to Ramsgate was placed under the command of Sub Lieutenant Robert Timbrell of the Royal Canadian Navy. Under his command, she was one of the Little Ships that took part in the Dunkirk evacuation. MY Llanthony brought back 280 men, and with trawlers added to his flotilla Timbrell was responsible for the evacuation of 900 troops. After the war, she was sold to Lord Astor of Hever Castle. Found languishing in Greece in 1995, she has since been restored and now forms part of the collection at Ardlamont Estate.

== Bibliography ==
- Cowden, James E (1981). The Price of Peace Elder Dempster 1939–1945. Liverpool: Jocast Ltd. ISBN 0-9507480-0-5.

Parliament of the United Kingdom
| Preceded by Robert Dennison | Member of Parliament for Birmingham King's Norton; 1929 – 1935 | Succeeded by Ronald Cartland |
