= Ambrose Callighan =

British trade unionist

Ambrose Callighan CBE (12 April 1883 – 15 March 1955) was a British trade unionist.

Callighan was born in Jarrow, County Durham. He worked in a foundry, joining the Cleveland Blastfurnacemen's Association. He also joined the Labour Party, and was elected to Jarrow Town Council in 1911.

In 1913, Callighan served as chairman of the Cleveland Blastfurnacemen. In 1919, he moved to Cumberland to become full-time secretary of the Cumberland and Lancashire Blastfurnacemen's Association, and in 1921, he was elected to Cumberland County Council.

The Cumberland and Lancashire Blastfurnacemen were affiliated to the National Union of Blastfurnacemen, Ore Miners, Coke Workers and Kindred Trades (NUB), and Callighan was elected as its president in 1939. Later in the year, the post of general secretary of the NUB became available, and Callighan was elected. In 1945, he was additionally elected to the General Council of the Trades Union Congress. He joined the Iron and Steel Board in 1946, and retired from all his posts two years later.

Callighan was appointed a Commander of the Order of the British Empire (CBE) in the 1948 Birthday Honours.

Trade union offices
Preceded by Henry Nixon	General President of the National Union of Blastfurnacemen; 1939	Succeeded by Harry France
Preceded by Thomas McKenna	General Secretary of the National Union of Blastfurnacemen; 1939 – 1948	Succeeded by Jack Owen
Preceded by John Brown and William Kean	Iron, Steel and Minor Metal Trades representative on the General Council of the TUC; 1945 – 1948; With: Lincoln Evans	Succeeded by Lincoln Evans and Jack Owen
