= Robert Dennison (politician) =

British Labour MP (1879–1951)

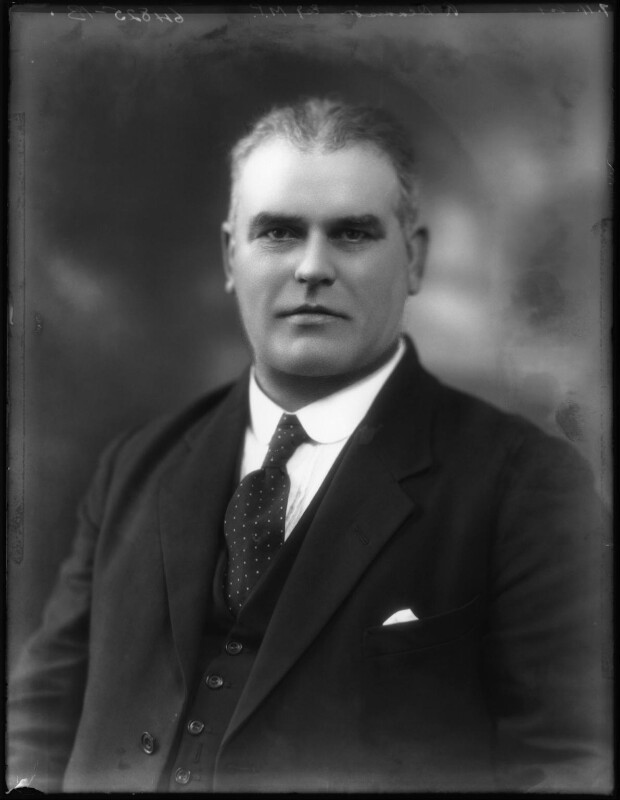
- Dennison in 1924

Member of Parliament for Birmingham King's Norton
- In office 29 October 1924 – 30 May 1929
- Majority: 133

Personal details
- Born: 14 December 1879
- Died: 10 November 1951 (aged 71)
- Party: Labour

Robert Dennison (14 December 1879 – 10 November 1951) was a British Labour Party politician.

Born in Glasgow, Dennison attended a Science School in the city. In 1912, he was elected to Stockton-on-Tees Town Council, for the Labour Party, serving until 1917. Also in 1912, he began working full-time for a trade union, a predecessor of the Iron and Steel Trades Confederation.

Dennison stood unsuccessfully in Walsall at the 1922 UK general election, and in Cleveland at the 1923 UK general election. He was finally elected for Birmingham King's Norton at the 1924 general election, with a small majority of 133 votes.

Dennison lost his seat to Lionel Beaumont-Thomas, a Conservative, at the 1929 general election, by 491 votes. He subsequently moved to New Barnet, where he was elected to the Urban District Council. He was also appointed as a magistrate for both Hertfordshire and Middlesex.

Parliament of the United Kingdom
Preceded by Herbert Austin	Member of Parliament for Birmingham King's Norton; 1924 – 1929	Succeeded by Lionel Beaumont Thomas
