= Thomas Hackett (British politician) =

Thomas Hackett (14 June 1869 – 9 May 1950) was a British co-operative activist and politician.

Born in Smethwick, Hackett left school at the age of thirteen and completed an apprenticeship in engineering. In 1892, he began working at Cadbury's, when he was promoted to night foreman, and then works foreman. He also joined the Ten Acres and Stirchley Co-operative Society, becoming a director in 1894, and served as president from 1923-1946.

Hackett joined the Labour Party, and was elected to Birmingham City Council in 1913, representing Rotton Park. He registered as a conscientious objector during World War I, which his opponents made a central issue when he stood at the 1918 general election. He contested Birmingham King's Norton for the Birmingham and District Co-operative Representation Council, and with the support of the Labour Party. He finished in second place with a 35.8% share of the vote. The council subsequently became the Birmingham branch of the Co-operative Party, and Hackett chaired the branch for four years from 1919.

In 1920, Hackett was re-elected to the council, now representing Northfield, and became an alderman in 1941, but finally lost his seat in 1949. In his spare time, he was a tutor for the Workers' Educational Association, and chairman and founder of the Brynmawr and Clydach Valley Industries (Public Utility Society).
