= Birmingham King's Norton =

Parliamentary constituency in the United Kingdom, 1918–1955

- Former borough constituency for the House of Commons

1918–1955
- Seats: One
- Created from: North Worcestershire and East Worcestershire
- Replaced by: Birmingham Selly Oak, Birmingham Hall Green and Birmingham Northfield
- During its existence contributed to new seat(s) of: Birmingham Northfield

Birmingham King's Norton was a constituency of the House of Commons of the Parliament of the United Kingdom from 1918 to 1955. It elected one Member of Parliament (MP) by the first-past-the-post system of election.

== Boundaries ==
The Representation of the People Act 1918 provided that the constituency was to consist of:

1918–1950: County Borough of Birmingham wards of Northfield and Selly Oak and the part of King's Norton which is not included in the Moseley Division

The Representation of the People Act 1948 provided that the constituency was to consist of:

1950–1955: County Borough of Birmingham wards of King's Norton and Moseley and King's Heath.

Moseley and King's Heath wards had previously been part of the Birmingham Moseley and Birmingham Sparkbrook constituencies, as had the part of King's Norton ward which lay to the north of Bells Lane and to the east and south-east of the middle of Monyhull Hall Road and Brandwood Road. Northfield and Selly Oak wards became the constituency of Birmingham Northfield.

== Members of Parliament ==
Election	Member	Party	Notes
1918	Sir Herbert Austin	Conservative	later Baron Austin
1924	Robert Dennison	Labour	
1929	Lionel Beaumont-Thomas	Conservative	
1935	Ronald Cartland	Conservative	
1941 by-election	John Peto	Conservative	
1945	Raymond Blackburn	Labour	Contested Birmingham Northfield following redistribution
Constituency split, majority joined Birmingham Northfield, minority merged with part of the abolished Birmingham Moseley
1950	Geoffrey Lloyd	Conservative	Member for Birmingham Ladywood (1931–1945); Contested Sutton Coldfield following redistribution
1955	Constituency abolished		

== Election results ==
=== Elections in the 1910s ===
General election 1918: Birmingham King's Norton
Party		Candidate	Votes	%
C	Unionist	Herbert Austin	8,809	54.5
	Co-operative Party (Labour)	Thomas Hackett	4,917	30.4
	Liberal	Norman Birkett	2,435	15.1
Majority			3,892	24.1
Turnout			16,161	
Registered electors				
	Unionist win (new seat)			
C indicates candidate endorsed by the coalition government.

=== Elections in the 1920s ===
General election 1922: Birmingham King's Norton
Party	Candidate	Votes	%	±%
Unionist	Herbert Austin	8,870	41.5	−13.0
Labour Co-op	Eleanor Barton	7,017	32.8	+2.4
Liberal	Walter Meakin	5,474	25.6	+10.5
Majority		1,853	8.7	−15.4
Turnout		21,361	74.0	
Registered electors				
Unionist hold		Swing		

General election 1923: Birmingham King's Norton
Party	Candidate	Votes	%	±%
Unionist	Herbert Austin	9,545	43.4	+1.9
Labour Co-op	Eleanor Barton	6,743	30.7	−2.1
Liberal	Elizabeth Cadbury	5,686	25.9	+0.3
Majority		2,802	12.7	+4.0
Turnout		21,974	74.1	+0.1
Registered electors				
Unionist hold		Swing	+2.0	

General election 1924: Birmingham King's Norton
Party	Candidate	Votes	%	±%
Labour	Robert Dennison	10,497	43.3	+12.6
Unionist	Herbert Austin	10,364	42.8	−0.6
Liberal	John Fryer	3,370	13.9	−12.0
Majority		133	0.5	N/A
Turnout		24,231	84.9	+10.8
Registered electors				
Labour gain from Unionist		Swing		

General election 1929: Birmingham King's Norton
Party	Candidate	Votes	%	±%
Unionist	Lionel Beaumont-Thomas	14,464	42.0	−0.8
Labour	Robert Dennison	13,973	40.6	−2.7
Liberal	Archie Marshall	5,998	17.4	+3.5
Majority		491	1.4	N/A
Turnout		34,435	82.8	−2.1
Registered electors				
Unionist gain from Labour		Swing	+1.0	

=== Elections in the 1930s ===
General election 1931: Birmingham King's Norton
Party	Candidate	Votes	%	±%
Conservative	Lionel Beaumont-Thomas	22,063	57.5	+15.5
Labour	Gilbert Mitchison	11,016	28.7	−11.9
Liberal	Archie Marshall	5,294	13.8	−3.6
Majority		11,047	28.8	+27.4
Turnout		38,373	81.0	−1.8
Registered electors				
Conservative hold		Swing	+13.7	

General election 1935: Birmingham King's Norton
Party	Candidate	Votes	%	±%
Conservative	Ronald Cartland	24,559	56.8	−0.7
Labour	Gilbert Mitchison	18,684	43.2	+14.5
Majority		5,875	13.6	−15.2
Turnout		43,243	74.6	−6.4
Registered electors				
Conservative hold		Swing		

=== Elections in the 1940s ===
1941 Birmingham King's Norton by-election
Party	Candidate	Votes	%	±%
Conservative	John Peto	21,573	86.9	+30.1
Independent	A. W. L. Smith	1,696	6.8	New
Pacifist	Stuart Morris	1,552	6.3	New
Majority		19,877	80.1	+66.5
Turnout		24,821	35.0	−39.6
Registered electors				
Conservative hold		Swing		

General election 1945: Birmingham King's Norton
Party	Candidate	Votes	%	±%
Labour	Raymond Blackburn	32,062	55.2	+12.0
Conservative	John Peto	19,764	34.0	−22.8
Liberal	Bertram Samuel White	6,289	10.8	New
Majority		12,298	21.2	N/A
Turnout		58,115	74.0	−0.6
Registered electors				
Labour gain from Conservative		Swing		

=== Elections in the 1950s ===
General election 1950: Birmingham King's Norton
Party	Candidate	Votes	%
Conservative	Geoffrey Lloyd	27,308	50.61
Labour	Albert Bradbeer	21,715	40.24
Liberal	Michael Beesley	4,940	9.15
Majority		5,593	10.37
Turnout		53,963	84.26
Registered electors			
Conservative win (new boundaries)			

General election 1951: Birmingham King's Norton
Party	Candidate	Votes	%	±%
Conservative	Geoffrey Lloyd	30,456	57.70	
Labour	Denis Howell	22,325	42.30	
Majority		8,131	15.40	
Turnout		52,781	81.63	
Registered electors				
Conservative hold		Swing		
