= Scout International Relief Service =

Organization of the Scout Association tasked with relief work

- Formation: 1942; 84 years ago
- Founder: The Scout Association
- Type: Organisation
- Purpose: Sending teams of adult Scouters to do relief work in refugee and displaced persons' camps
- Region served: Northwest Europe, Italy, Austria, Yugoslavia, Greece, Cyprus, Syria, Palestine, Egypt and Hong Kong

Scout International Relief Service was an organisation set up by the Scout Association in Britain in 1942 with the aim of sending teams of adult Scouters to do relief work in refugee and displaced persons' camps in Northwest Europe, Italy, Austria, Yugoslavia, Greece, Cyprus, Syria, Palestine, Egypt and Hong Kong after World War II.
