= British Productivity Council =

The British Productivity Council (BPC) was a body that aimed to increase Britain's industrial efficiency. It was formed in 1953 and superseded the Anglo-American Council on Productivity (AACP), which was formed in 1948 and dissolved in 1952. Until 1973, it was funded by the UK government before it was reorganised into smaller Local Productivity Associations and renamed as the British Council of Productivity Associations. The Council was dissolved in 1999.

== History ==
The idea for the Anglo-American Council on Productivity came jointly from Stafford Cripps, the Chancellor of the Exchequer, and Paul G. Hoffman, the Marshall Plan administrator, in July 1948. The AACP operated from August 1948 to June 1952, with a budget of a million pounds, two-thirds of which was provided by the Marshall Plan. In response to a parliamentary question from William Teeling in November 1949, Cripps said that the UK government had contributed £87,500 to the AACP that year. The council was made of twenty members, twelve British and eight American, meeting in a joint session roughly once a year. British members included representatives from the Trades Union Congress, the Federation of British Industries and the British Employers' Confederation. The AACP commissioned hundreds of reports and We Too Can Prosper, a popular book on productivity by economist Graham Hutton.

Initial media coverage was unfavourable and trade union leaders were irritated that they had not been consulted and at the implication that British industry needed American help. Though there is no clear evidence that Britain significantly benefited from the AACP, the exercise was seen as "a great success" by its sponsors, leading to the establishment of the BPC in 1953. The Trades Union Congress "participated wholehartedly" in the BPC, to the criticism of some of its members, such as Les Cannon and Ted Hill, who was disciplined by the TUC for his public opposition to the BPC's productivity campaigns.

The BPC's first chair was Peter Bennett, the then-MP for Birmingham Edgbaston, and its first vice-chair was the TUC's Lincoln Evans.

The BPC also sponsored the creation of the National Industrial Fuel Efficiency Service.

== Organisation ==
The BPC's chair alternated between a representative of the trade unions and one from the industry. Notable chairpeople and board members include:

- Sir Peter Bennett
- William Carron
- James Crawford
- Lincoln Evans
- Thomas Jacomb Hutton
- Lord McCorquodale of Newton
- Sir Charles Norris
- Ewart Smith
- Bertram White (a director of Albright and Wilson)
- Lord Williamson

== Activities ==
The BPC started many campaigns, like the National Productivity Year from November 1962 to November 1963, and the Quality and Reliability Year in 1966. It also distributed a publication called Target aimed at educating workers and employers about better workplace practices and adapting to changing markets.

The BPC also made educational films such as Views on Trial (1954). Dispute, a BPC film on industrial relations, won the BAFTA Film Award for Best Specialised Film in 1960. Sarah Erulkar produced several films for the BPC, including the Training For Industry series in 1959.

=== National Productivity Year ===
National Productivity Year was given patronage by the Duke of Edinburgh and was supported by both the Prime Minister and the Leader of the Opposition at the time, Harold Macmillan and Hugh Gaitskell respectively. A set of commemorative stamps was released in November 1962 to celebrate it.

Its impact was described as "negligible", and it was recorded as beginning "disastrously" with a decline in outputs.
