= Richard Thomas and Baldwins =

Richard Thomas and Baldwins Ltd (RTB) was a major iron, steel and tinplate producer, primarily based in Wales and formed in 1948 by the merger of Richard Thomas & Co Ltd with Baldwins Ltd. It was absorbed into British Steel Corporation in 1967. The business now forms part of Tata Steel Europe.

== Richard Thomas & Co ==
Richard Thomas & Co Ltd was an iron, steel and tinplate producer and colliery proprietor. The founder, Richard Thomas (died 1916), leased two tinplate works in Gloucestershire: Lydbrook in 1871 and Lydney in 1876. He went on to acquire local collieries and, in 1888, the Melingriffith Tin Plate Works near Cardiff.

Richard Thomas & Co, in which Thomas was succeeded as managing director by his son, Richard Beaumont Thomas, in 1888, became one of the principal tinplate manufacturers in the UK.

The Ebbw Vale Steel Iron and Coal Company was taken over by Richard Thomas & Co in 1936, and a new steel plant and strip mill was erected in the town.

== Baldwins ==
Baldwins Ltd began as EP&W Baldwin, ironfounders of Stourport. In 1870, Alfred Baldwin bought out his relatives to become the sole proprietor of the firm, but continued to trade under the old name. In 1888, he brought his 21-year-old son Stanley, afterwards Prime Minister of the United Kingdom, into the business. The firm was incorporated as EP&W Baldwin Ltd in 1898, and gradually acquired a number of tinplate works, mainly in South Wales.

== Richard Thomas & Baldwins ==
In 1948 RTB introduced the first continuous tinning line at its Ebbw Vale tinplate works.

In 1951, RTB was nationalised and placed under the Iron and Steel Corporation of Great Britain. Under Conservative rule in 1953 it passed to the Iron and Steel Holding and Realisation Agency in readiness for privatisation. However, its size – it was the UK's largest steel company – inhibited its sale. It was still in public ownership when the industry was re-nationalised under British Steel Corporation in 1967.

The major event during public ownership as a separate company was the official opening in 1962 of the Spencer Steelworks at Llanwern, a wholly new plant on a greenfield site to the east of Newport. This was named after H F Spencer, managing director of RTB at the time construction of the works was announced in 1956.
