= Bill Sirs =

William Sirs (6 January 1920 – 16 June 2015) was a British trade unionist, who served as general secretary of the Iron and Steel Trades Confederation (ISTC) from 1975 to 1985.

Bill Sirs was born and raised in Hartlepool, one of 10 children. He left school at 14 and became a crane operator in the iron and steel industry, becoming active in forerunners of the ISTC. He remained in north-east England until he moved south with his two children and his wife Joan.

Sirs is best remembered for his involvement in the steelworkers' strike of 1980. During the action, Sirs came into conflict with Ian MacGregor, the man appointed by Prime Minister Margaret Thatcher to slim down British Steel Corporation, then a nationalised industry. Sirs was quoted as saying, "We are being looked upon as the worst producing steel nation in Europe".

Sirs subsequently incurred the wrath of other trade unionists by his intervention in the miners' strike of 1984.

Sirs was a member of the St Ermin's group, an organised group of right-wing trade unionists meeting at the St Ermin's Hotel with the aim of preventing the Bennite left taking over the Labour Party.

== Works ==
- Hard Labour. Sidgwick & Jackson, 1985.

Trade union offices
Preceded by Jim Diamond	Assistant General Secretary of the Iron and Steel Trades Confederation; 1973 – 1975	Succeeded by Roy Evans
Preceded by Dai Davies	General Secretary of the Iron and Steel Trades Confederation; 1975 – 1985	Succeeded by Roy Evans
Preceded by Dai Davies	Iron, Steel and Minor Metal Trades representative on the General Council of the TUC; 1975 – 1982	Succeeded by Council reorganised
Preceded by Geoffrey Drain	Trades Union Congress representative to the AFL-CIO; 1985	Succeeded by Fred Jarvis
