= Associated Iron and Steel Workers of Great Britain =

Union of Iron and Steel workers in Great Britain

The Associated Iron and Steel Workers of Great Britain was a trade union representing people employed in iron- and steelworks in Britain.

The union was founded in 1887, following a conference organised by Edward Trow of the Amalgamated Malleable Ironworkers of Great Britain, which had been in decline for many years. In particular, Trow worried that many of the remaining members worked on contracts in declining ironworking areas, while the new British Steel Smelters' Association (BSSA) aimed to unionise daily paid workers, and indeed campaigned against contracts.

Trow organised a conference in Manchester, where attendees represented 40,000 iron and steel workers. In order to minimise regional rivalries, its rules stated that the president must come from South Staffordshire, and the vice-president from Lancashire. Trow was elected as general secretary, unpaid for the first three months. He suggested that, after this time, the post would be held jointly with James Capper, but Capper was not interested in the role.

In contrast to the earlier union, the Associated also sought to unionise workers in the rapidly growing steelworks, and it had particular success in attracting contractors to join. In 1891, the Malleable Ironworkers was wound up, and its few remaining members transferred to the Associated, with membership reaching 10,000 in 1892. Although this varied over the next decade, it was still around 8,000 in 1899, when Trow died, and the old regional rivalries had by then been overcome.

During the 1900s, the union lost members due to a decline in employment at ironworks, and through some potential members joining the rival BSSA. Both unions were members of the Trades Union Congress and their demarcation dispute came to a head in 1909. The foundation of the loose Iron and Steel Trades Federation in 1913 did not solve the issue, but in the Associated began growing again and merged into the new British Iron, Steel and Kindred Trades Association in 1917, at which point it had just under 10,000 members.

== General Secretaries ==
1887: Edward Trow
1899: James Cox
