= Herbert Austin, 1st Baron Austin =

English engineer and car manufacturer

The Right Honourable The Lord Austin KBE
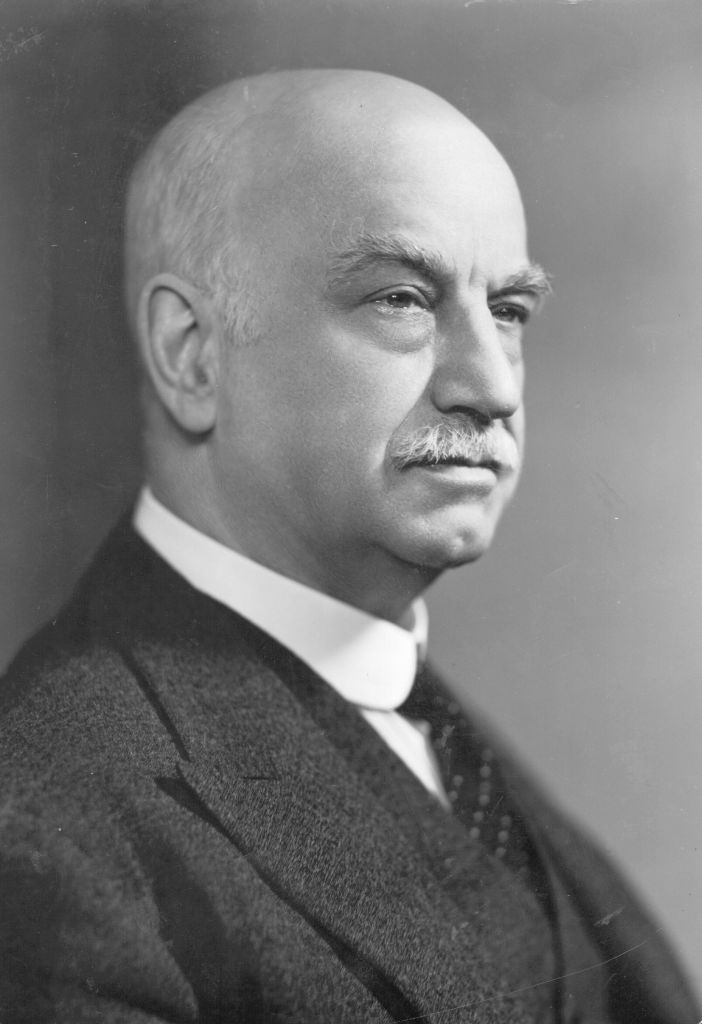

Member of Parliament for Birmingham King's Norton
- In office 14 December 1918 – 9 October 1924
- Preceded by: New constituency
- Succeeded by: Robert Dennison

Personal details
- Born: 8 November 1866 Little Missenden, Buckinghamshire, England
- Died: 23 May 1941 (aged 74) Birmingham, England
- Party: Conservative
- Spouse(s): Helen, Lady Austin
- Children: 3

Herbert Austin, 1st Baron Austin KBE (8 November 1866 – 23 May 1941) was an English automobile designer and builder who founded the Austin Motor Company. For the majority of his career he was known as Sir Herbert Austin, and the Northfield bypass is called "Sir Herbert Austin Way" after him.

== Background and early life ==
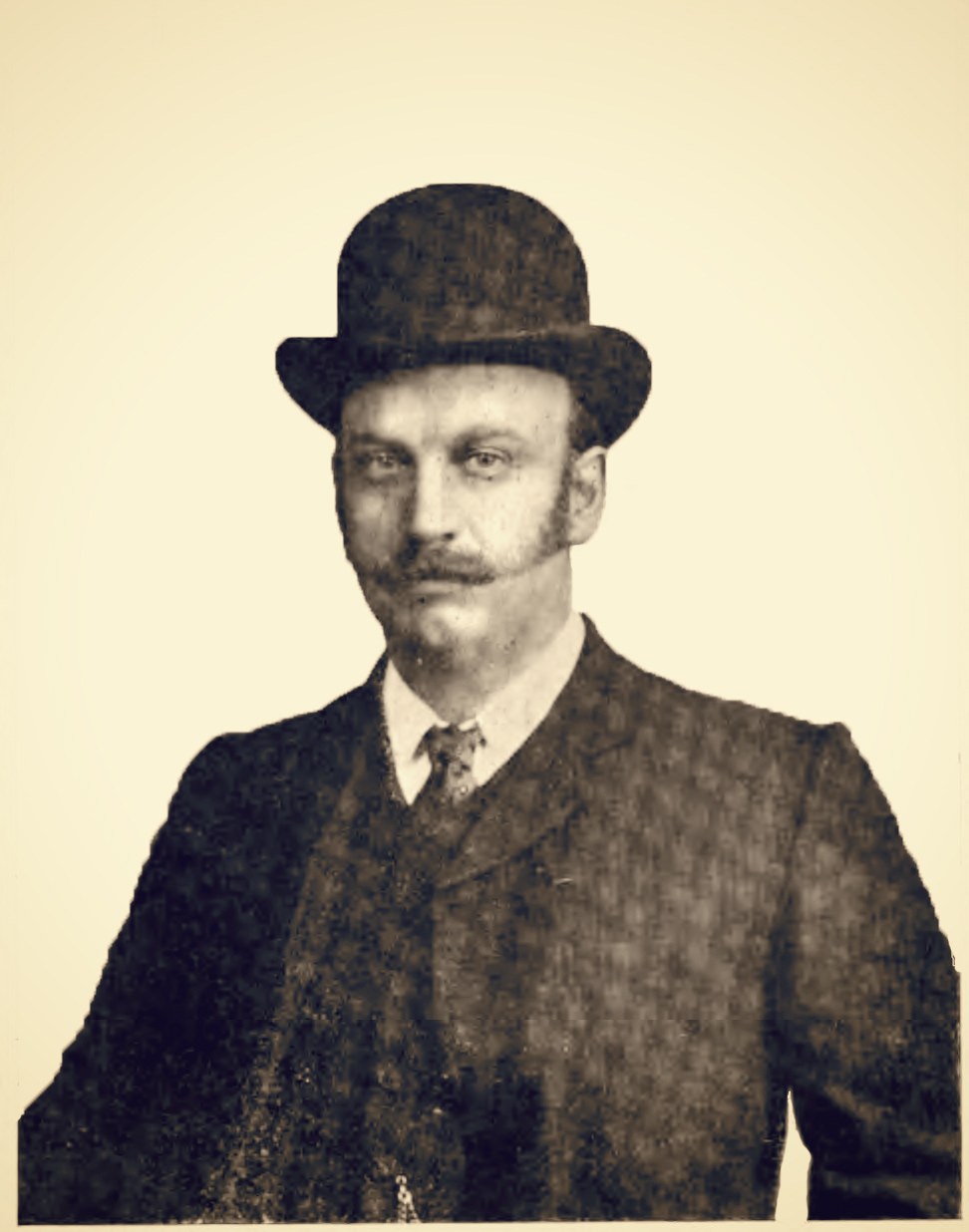
Herbert Austin aged 38, 1905 (Note: "Mr H Austin, who has for so many years been associated with the Wolseley Tool and Motor Car Company, Limited, and who is starting new works, where he will manufacture Austin Cars, at Longbridge, near Birmingham" Mr H Austin, who has been for so long associated with the Wolseley Tool and Motor Car Co. of Adderley Park, Birmingham, advises us that he is leaving the Company, and is starting works on his own account situated at Longbridge, near Birmingham, where he will manufacture vehicles which are to be known as the ‘'Austin'’ Cars. At first Mr Austin will turn out two sizes of tourist cars viz., a 15–20 hp and a 25–30 hp. both of which models will embody the best approved principles in design, and Mr Austin proposes to use only the highest grade of materials in their manufacture. Moderation is to govern the selling price, and Mr Austin hopes to make the car of his name a household word for reliability and good service. Captan Frank Kayser is associated with Mr Austin in the new undertaking and he will be assisted by a specially-selected staff, several of whom have been connected with him in the past. The works are of considerable extent, covering several acres, and are thoroughly suitable for the construction of automobiles of all types. Mr Austin hopes to have his first 25–30 hp car on the road by 1 December and to commence deliveries by the end of March 1906. Mr Austin sends us, in a tabulated form, an extremely interesting record gained by the cars which have been turned out by the Wolseley Company during his direction of that Company. This list bristles with gold and silver medals in all the leading reliability and consumption trials, exhibitions etc whilst in the speed events and hill-climbing contests, the number of winners makes a formidable show, these triumphs being in addition to the selection by the A.C.G.B.I. of the Wolseley racers in 1904 and 1905 for the Gordon Bennett Race. ‘'The Automotor Journal, 4 November 1905 Page 1366'’) The portrait published with his announcement that he had left Wolseley and was setting up on his own account

The son of a farmer, he was born in Little Missenden, Buckinghamshire in South East England, but the family moved to Wentworth Woodhouse, near Rotherham, Yorkshire in 1870 when his father was appointed farm bailiff. Herbert Austin first went to the village school, later continuing his education at Rotherham Grammar School.

In 1884, he emigrated to Australia, travelling with a maternal uncle, who lived in Melbourne but had recently returned to England on a family visit. They travelled to Australia by ship, via the Cape.

== Life in Melbourne ==
He started work with his uncle who was the works manager at a general engineering firm, Mephan Ferguson, in North Melbourne. Two years later he joined Alex. Cowan & Sons, a Scottish paper business which had an agency for printing equipment and Crossley gas engines. Later he worked for the Langlands Foundry Company Limited in Yarra Bank, Melbourne, which made locomotive boilers, wheels and gold mining equipment.

To develop his drawing skills, Austin attended Hotham School of Art in North Melbourne, outside working hours. During this time, he submitted a design for a swing bridge over the Yarra River at Spencer Street, Melbourne, for a competition organised by the Government of Victoria, but did not win.

In December 1887, Austin took up his new appointment as manager of an engineering workshop owned by Richard Pickup Park, who was developing a new sheep-shearing machine for Frederick York Wolseley.

On the strength of this new managership, he married Helen Dron in Melbourne on 26 December 1887. Born in Melbourne on 23 October 1866, she was the seventh daughter of Scottish parents. They were to have two daughters, Irene (born in 1891, later Mrs. Waite) and Zeta (later to become Mrs Lambert). Their only son, Vernon James Austin, was killed in action in France during the First World War on 26 January 1915.

After Austin spent three months improving the sheep-shearing machine, he was asked to join The Wolseley Sheep Shearing Machine Company, in Sydney. Shortly after joining, he was sent to a sheep station at Avoca, Victoria to study the machines in use. Austin patented in his own name the improvements he made to the sheep-shearing machines and later sold the patents to the Wolseley Sheep Shearing Machine Company on 10 March 1893 in exchange for shares.

== Motor cars ==
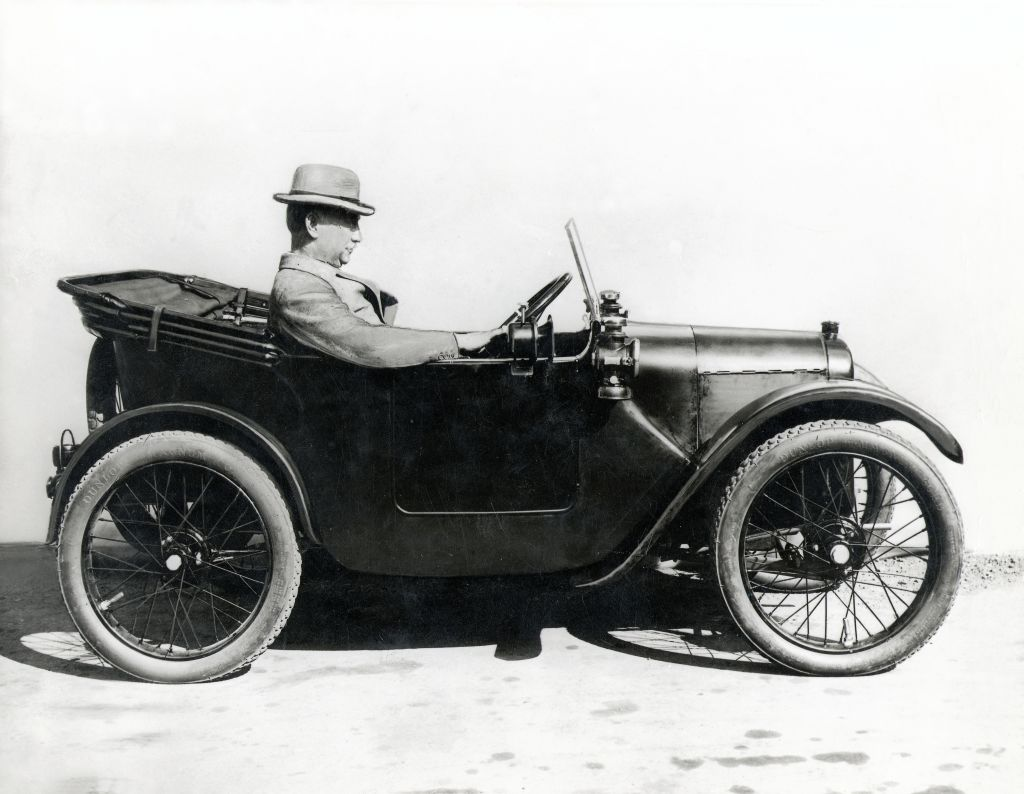
Austin driving an Austin 7

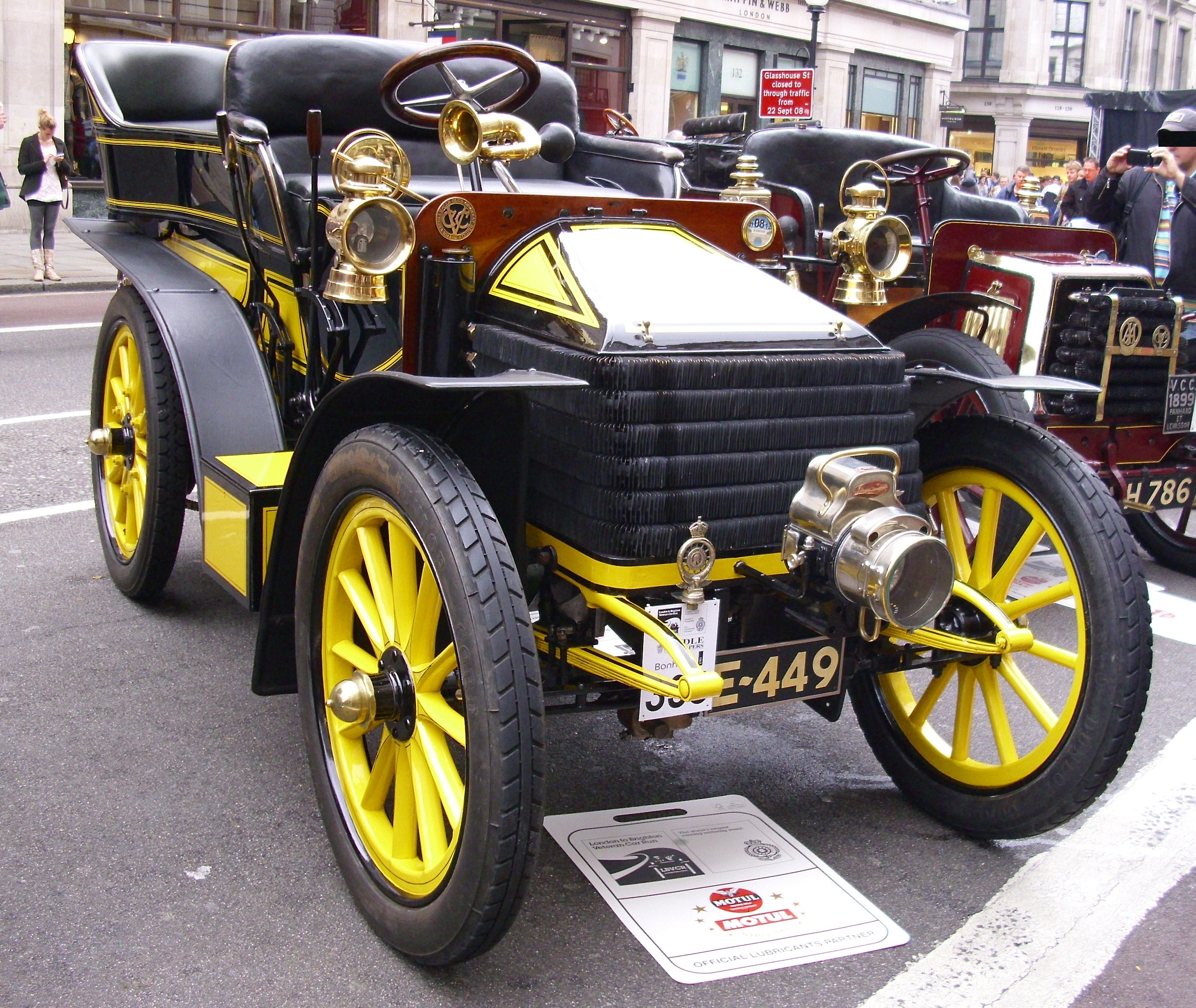
Wolseley by Herbert Austin 10 hp 2-cylinders 1141 cc 1903 example

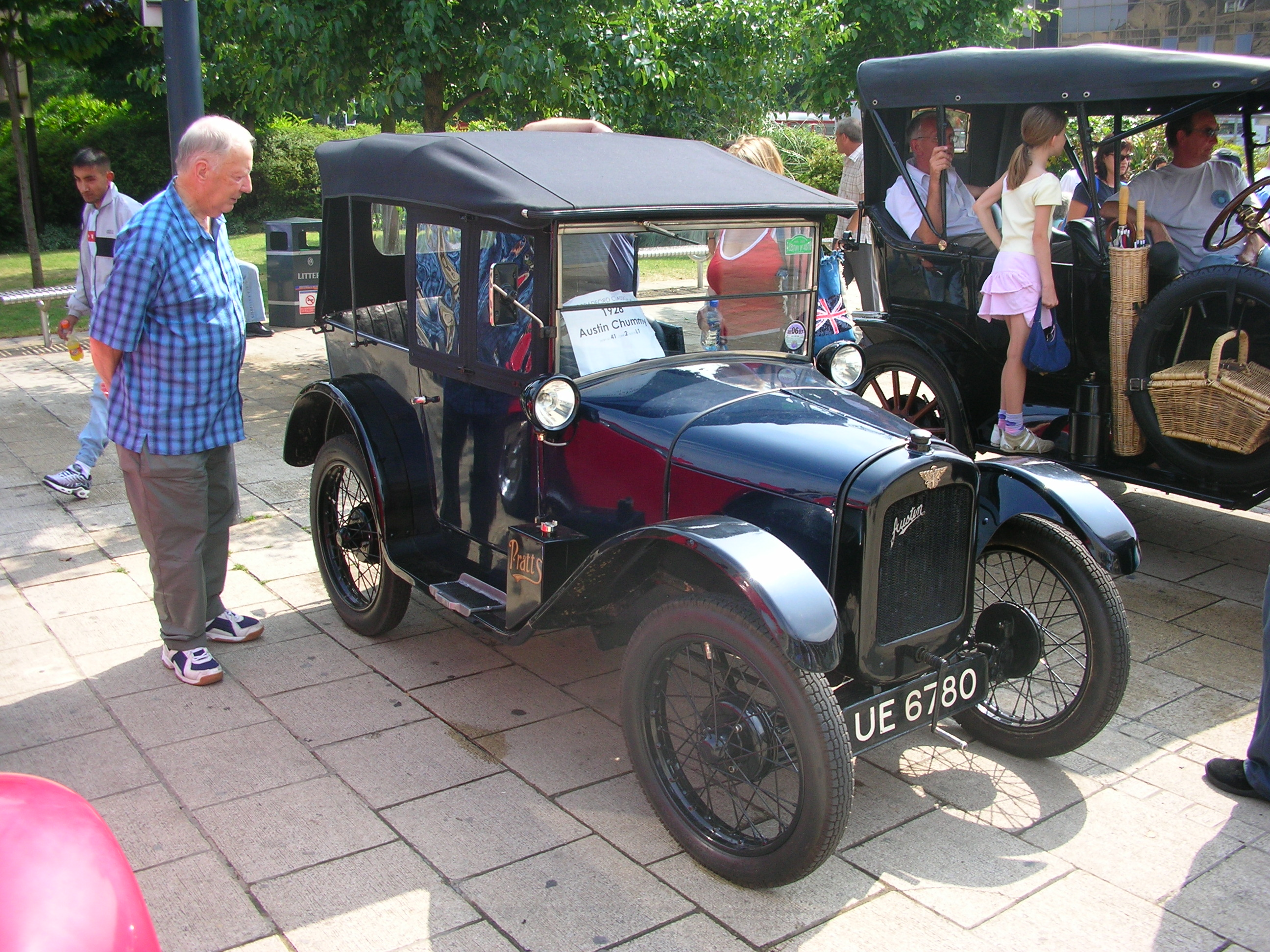
Austin by Herbert Austin 7 Chummy, 1928 example

Frederick Wolseley wound up the Sydney-registered company in 1889 and transferred ownership of the business to a new company registered in London but all operations remained in Australia. Difficulties with suppliers persuaded the Wolseley board to move assembly to England in 1893. Frederick Wolseley and Herbert Austin left John Howard in charge of the Australian operation and returned to England in November 1893. Austin set up a factory in Broad Street, Birmingham. Fredrick Wolseley resigned from the company in 1894. The Broad Street factory was not large enough, so Austin bought a bigger premises in Aston, Birmingham. Shearing machinery sales were highly seasonal, thus during slack periods in the year they built bicycles.

Looking for other products to even out the workload, Herbert Austin became interested in motor cars and built two different types of three-wheelers in his own time. A version of one of these was taken up by the Wolseley Sheep Shearing Machine Company and listed for sale in 1900, but the Wolseley board could see no profitable future for a motor industry. In 1901, Vickers bought Wolseley's car interests, taking Austin too, and naming the new business Wolseley Tool & Motor Company setting it up in Adderley Park, Birmingham. Herbert Austin retained his interest and ties with The Wolseley Sheep Shearing Machine Company. He was chairman of their board from 1911 to 1933, when he retired shortly before his death.

In 1905, still under an unexpired five-year contract, Austin resigned from the Wolseley Tool & Motor Company, taking some of the senior staff with him. His brother Harry also joined him in this new venture, having worked with him at Wolseley in Birmingham. Austin raised capital of £37,000 (£4,369,468.69 adjusted for inflation in 2018) and embarked on a search for a factory that could accommodate his idea for a new car manufacturer. He took over an old print works, still outside Birmingham, in Longbridge, which was then in the County of Worcestershire; Longbridge did not become a suburb of Birmingham until 1911 when the city's boundaries were expanded. The Austin car works at Longbridge was later to become one of the greatest car manufacturers in the world (also see Longbridge plant).

Austin was producing seventeen different models by 1908. During the First World War Austin produced munitions and built Austin Village in Turves Green for his workers. The car business was difficult after World War I; the Austin company was threatened with bankruptcy in 1921 and a receiver was appointed. The "Baby Austin" was launched in 1922 and offered for sale at £225 (£12,417.65 in 2018); putting it within the budget of customers who had never owned a car before. Its output reached 25,000 annually by 1925; the price was lowered each year. In 1931, the Austin 12/6 was introduced, followed by the Austin 12/4 in 1933.

== Military production ==
The company turned its resources to the war effort in 1914 and, in 1917, Austin was knighted for his services and also received the Belgium Order of the Crown of Leopold II, for the employment of 3,000 Belgian refugees at Longbridge.

During World War II, the company specialised in making aircraft; Horsa glider fuselages; specialist army vehicles; hydraulic motors for gun turrets; ammunition boxes, magazines for machine guns, tommy guns, Oerlikon anti-aircraft guns; marine engines for ships lifeboats; and pressings for jerrycans.

=== British shadow factories ===
Up until 1938, the Air Ministry had been headed by Lord Swinton, who at that point had been forced to resign his position by Prime Minister Neville Chamberlain due to a lack of progress in re-arming the Royal Air Force. New minister Sir Kingsley Wood implemented a new plan to treble British aircraft production in the run up to the Second World War in two parts:

- Development of nine new factories
- Extension and extensions to existing factory complexes to allow either easier switching to aircraft industry capability, or production capacity expansion

Underneath the plan, there was government funding for the building of these new production facilities, in the form of grants and loans. Key to the plan were the products and plans of Rolls-Royce Limited, whose Merlin engine powered many of the key aircraft being developed by the Air Ministry. Austin was placed in charge of implementing the scheme on the producers' side, who were mainly motor vehicle manufacturers; while technical liaison with the aircraft industry was placed with Charles Bruce-Gardner.

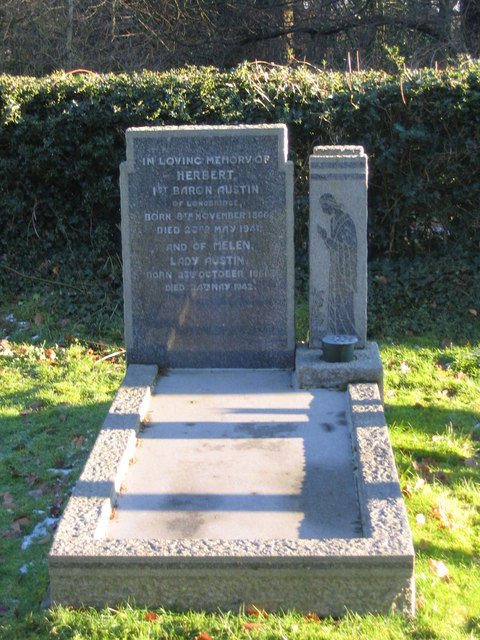
Grave of Lord and Lady Austin

== Parliamentary career ==
From 1918 to 1924, Austin served as the Conservative Member of Parliament (MP) for Birmingham King's Norton but never made a speech in the House of Commons. In 1936, he was created Baron Austin, of Longbridge in the City of Birmingham. In 1937, he received a Doctor of Laws (LL.D.) from the University of Birmingham.

Lord Austin died from a heart attack and a bout of pneumonia. His only son Vernon had been killed in action in France in 1915 and the peerage became extinct upon his death. He and his wife also had two daughters, Irene (later to become Mrs. Waite) and Zeta (later to become Mrs. Lambert).

He was buried with his wife Helen, Lady Austin in the churchyard of Holy Trinity Church, Lickey, near his former home at Lickey Grange and the factory at Longbridge, close to both Bromsgrove and Birmingham.

== Arms ==
Coat of arms of Herbert Austin, 1st Baron Austin
Crest A Garb Or charged with a Steering Wheel and Column winged Gules Escutcheon Gules a Cross between in the first and fourth quarters a Garb and in the second and third quarters a Lozenge Or Supporters On either side a Bull Sable gorged with a Collar of Lozenges conjoined Or Motto Forward

== Notes ==
Parliament of the United Kingdom
New constituency	Member of Parliament for Birmingham King's Norton; 1918–1924	Succeeded by Robert Dennison
Peerage of the United Kingdom
New creation	Baron Austin; 1936–1941	Extinct
