= 1920 in the United Kingdom =

Events from the year 1920 in the United Kingdom.

== Incumbents ==
- Monarch – George V
- Prime Minister – David Lloyd George (Coalition)

== Events ==
- January–November – Experimental radio broadcasts including speech and music are made from a studio at the Marconi Company factory in Chelmsford, Essex.
- 9 January – The cargo steamer Treveal is wrecked in the English Channel; 35 people lose their lives.
- 23 February – War Secretary Winston Churchill announces that conscripts will be replaced by a volunteer army of 220,000 men.
- 10 March – The Ulster Unionist Council accepts the Government's plan for a Parliament of Northern Ireland.
- 17 March – Queen Alexandra unveils a monument to Nurse Edith Cavell in London.
- 27 March – Troytown wins the Grand National.
- 29 March – Sir William Robertson is promoted to Field Marshal, the first man to rise from private (enlisted 1877) to the highest rank in the British Army.
- 31 March
  - In the Second reading, debate in Parliament on the Government of Ireland Bill, Unionist leader Sir Edward Carson opposes the division of Ireland, seeing it as a betrayal of Unionists in the south and west.
  - Disestablishment of the Church in Wales comes into effect, under terms of the Welsh Church Act 1914.
- 5–30 April – 1920 blind march, a protest march of 250 blind men from Newport (Wales), Manchester and Leeds to London organised by the National League of the Blind to campaign for improved working conditions and social provision, with a rally at Trafalgar Square on 25 April.
- 10 April – West Bromwich Albion win the Football League title for the first time.
- 20 April–12 September – Great Britain and Ireland compete at the 1920 Summer Olympics in Antwerp and win 15 gold, 15 silver and 13 bronze medals.
- 24 April – Aston Villa beat Huddersfield Town 1–0 in the first FA Cup Final since 1915.
- 29 April – Welwyn Garden City established by Ebenezer Howard. The first house is occupied just before Christmas.
- 7 May – Morecambe F.C. is founded during a meeting at the West View Hotel on the town's promenade.
- 10 May – Forty Irish republican prisoners on hunger strike at Wormwood Scrubs are released.
- 11 May – Oswald Mosley, a Conservative MP, marries Cynthia Curzon, second daughter of ex-Viceroy of India, Earl Curzon of Kedleston, in the Chapel Royal of St James's Palace, London.
- 13 May – "Hands Off Russia" campaign: London dockers refuse to load the SS Jolly George with munitions intended for Poland in the Polish–Soviet War.
- 17 May – Sinn Féin supporters and Unionists engage in pitched street battles in Derry.
- 18 May – Women lecturers are given equal status to their male colleagues at the University of Oxford.
- 21 May – The UK Government proposes a car tax of £1 per horsepower (13 p/kW).
- 29 May – Louth flood of 1920 in Lincolnshire kills 23.
- 9 June – King George V opens the Imperial War Museum at The Crystal Palace.
- 15 June – Australian soprano Nellie Melba becomes history's first well-known performer to make a radio broadcast when she sings two arias as part of the series of Marconi broadcasts from Chelmsford.
- 20 June – Five people are killed during severe rioting in Ulster.
- 24 June – Troops are sent to reinforce the Derry garrison.
- 3 July – The Scenic Railway (roller coaster) at Dreamland Margate amusement park opens, the first in the UK.
- 5 July – A new airmail service starts from London to Amsterdam.
- 13 July – London County Council bans aliens from almost all council jobs.
- 16 July – World War I is officially declared over with Austria.
- 21 July – Protestants expel Catholic workers from the Harland and Wolff shipyard in Belfast.
- 23 July – Fourteen die and one hundred are injured in fierce rioting in Belfast.
- 24 July – Frank T. Courtney wins the Aerial Derby aircraft race from Hendon at an average speed of 153.5 mph (247.0 km/h).
- 28 July – The first women jury members in England are empanelled at Bristol quarter sessions.
- 30 July–8 August – 1st World Scout Jamboree held at Olympia, London.
- 31 July
  - Irish-born Roman Catholic Archbishop of Melbourne Daniel Mannix is detained on board ship off Queenstown and prevented from landing in Ireland or from speaking in the main Irish Catholic communities elsewhere in the UK.
  - The Communist Party of Great Britain is founded in London.
- 1 August – The first Congress of the Communist Party of Great Britain opens.
- 3 August – There are Catholic riots in Belfast in protest at the continuing British Army presence.
- 9 August – The Labour Party says it will call for a general strike if the United Kingdom declares war on Russia.
- 13 August – The Restoration of Order in Ireland Act receives Royal Assent, providing for Irish Republican Army activists to be tried by court-martial rather than by jury in criminal courts.
- 16 August
  - Blind Persons Act 1920 passed, the world's first disability-specific legislation, providing a pension allowance for blind persons aged between 50 and 70 years of age, directing local authorities to make provision for the welfare of blind people and regulating charities in the sector.
  - First Firearms Act passed.
- 18 August – The first night bus services are introduced in London.
- 28 August – The first games in the new Football League Third Division are played by the 22 clubs who were elected to the new division from the Southern League. Among the members of the new division are Southampton, Crystal Palace, Millwall, Norwich City, Queen's Park Rangers and Luton Town. A northern section is planned for next season.
- 29 August – Eleven die and forty are injured in street battles in Belfast.
- September
  - First Bentley cars are delivered to customers.
  - City of Birmingham Orchestra formed, the UK's first municipally-supported orchestra.
- 22 September – The Metropolitan Police forms the Flying Squad, following an announcement on 17 February that their horses will be replaced by cars.
- 7 October – The first one hundred women are admitted to study for full degrees at the University of Oxford.
- 10 October – It is announced that compulsory hand signals are to be introduced for all drivers. Hand signals will remain a crucial part of motoring life until the 1970s, when the increased use of indicators on vehicles renders them no longer necessary.
- 14 October – The first women receive degrees at the University of Oxford, these being awarded retrospectively. Dorothy L. Sayers and Ivy Williams are among them.
- 16 October – Miners go on strike.
- 20 October – The suffragette activist Sylvia Pankhurst is charged with sedition after calling upon workers to loot the London Docks.
- 25 October
  - The Emergency Powers Bill to counter the miners' strike has its second reading in the House of Commons.
  - Terence MacSwiney, jailed Lord Mayor of Cork, dies in Brixton Prison after a 78-day hunger strike.
- 28 October – Sylvia Pankhurst is jailed for six months.
- 3 November – The miners' strike ends after only a small majority vote to continue.
- 8 November – Rupert Bear first appears in a cartoon strip in the Daily Express.
- 10 November – The body of The Unknown Warrior arrives from France aboard HMS Verdun.
- 11 November – King George V unveils The Cenotaph in London; The Unknown Warrior is buried in Westminster Abbey.
- 15 November – First complete public performance of Gustav Holst's suite The Planets given in London by the London Symphony Orchestra conducted by Albert Coates.
- 21 November – Bloody Sunday: the Irish Republican Army, on the instructions of Michael Collins, shoot dead the Cairo gang, fourteen British undercover agents in Dublin, most in their homes. Later the same day in retaliation, the Auxiliary Division of the Royal Irish Constabulary open fire on a crowd at a Gaelic Athletic Association Football match in Croke Park, killing thirteen spectators and one player and wounding 60. Three men are shot on this night in Dublin Castle "while trying to escape".
- 28 November – Kilmichael Ambush: the flying column of the 3rd Cork Brigade IRA, led by Tom Barry, ambushes two lorries carrying Auxiliaries at Kilmichael, County Cork, killing seventeen (with three of its men also dying), which leads to official reprisals.
- 29 November – Rationing imposed during World War I ends when the restriction on availability of sugar is lifted by the Government.
- 5 December – The Scots vote against prohibition.
- 9 December – The Navy, Army and Air Force Institutes (NAAFI) is established by the government as a not-for-profit civilian organisation to provide canteens, shops and other recreational facilities for serving other ranks in the British armed forces and their families worldwide; it begins trading in 1921.
- 11 December – Irish War of Independence: the Burning of Cork: British forces set fire to 5 acres (20,000 m^{2}) of the centre of the city of Cork, including the City Hall, in reprisal attacks after a British auxiliary is killed in a guerilla ambush.
- 15 December – Vaughan Williams' The Lark Ascending is premiered in its original version for violin and piano with Marie Hall as violinist at Shirehampton near Bristol.
- 23 December
  - Government of Ireland Act 1920, passed by the Parliament of the United Kingdom, receives Royal Assent from George V providing for the partition of Ireland into Northern Ireland and Southern Ireland with separate parliaments, granting a measure of home rule.
  - Jewish leaders in London launch a £25 million appeal for Palestine.
- 26 December – Dick, Kerr's Ladies F.C. draw the largest-ever crowd to attend a women's association football match, 53,000 spectators at Goodison Park, Liverpool, for a game against St. Helen's Ladies.
- December – Madge Easton Anderson becomes the first woman admitted to practice as a professional lawyer in the UK when she qualifies as a solicitor (law agent) in Scotland.

=== Undated ===
- This year sees the all-time highest annual number of live births in the country, over 1.1 million.
- Meccano Ltd of Liverpool produce the first Hornby toy train, a clockwork 0 gauge model.
- Prince Albert (later George VI), having become Duke of York earlier in the year, meets Elizabeth Bowes-Lyon, who will become his wife in 1923 (and later Queen Elizabeth The Queen Mother).
- Huddersfield Corporation buys the leaseholds of much of the town from the Ramsden estate for £1.3M, becoming "the town that bought itself".

== Publications ==
- Edmund Blunden's The Waggoner and Other Poems.
- John Galsworthy's novels In Chancery and Awakening, part of The Forsyte Saga.
- Dean William Inge's Romanes Lecture The Idea of Progress.
- Wilfred Owen's collected Poems (posthumous).
- Charles à Court Repington's The First World War, 1914–1918.
- The anthology Valour and Vision: Poems of the War, 1914–1918.

== Births ==
=== January – March ===
- 1 January - Cecily Geraghty, British centenarian (died 2026)
- 2 January – Andrew Cavendish, 11th Duke of Devonshire, peer (died 2004)
- 3 January – Hugh McCartney, Labour MP (died 2006)
- 5 January – William Ward, 4th Earl of Dudley, life peer (died 2013)
- 6 January
  - John Maynard Smith, biologist and geneticist (died 2004)
  - Doris Stokes, spiritualist and medium (died 1987)
- 9 January – Clive Dunn, actor (died 2012)
- 12 January
  - James Bottomley, diplomat (died 2013)
  - Janet Elizabeth Macgregor, physician and cytologist (died 2005)
- 20 January
  - Sarah Baring, socialite and memoirist (died 2013)
  - John Maynard Smith, theoretical evolutionary biologist and geneticist (died 2004)
  - Joyce Waley-Cohen, educationist and public servant (died 2013)
- 22 January
  - Philippa Pearce, children's author (died 2006)
  - Alf Ramsey, footballer and manager (died 1999)
  - Charlie Stubbs, footballer (died 1984)
- 24 January – Keith Douglas, poet (killed in action 1944)
- 26 January – Derek Bond, actor (died 2006)
- 27 January – John Box, film production designer (died 2005)
- 28 January – James A. Whyte, priest and theologian (died 2005)
- 30 January
  - Michael Anderson, film director (died 2018)
  - Patrick Heron, painter, writer and designer (died 1999)
- 31 January – Bert Williams, footballer (died 2014)
- 5 February – Frank Muir, actor, comedy writer and raconteur (died 1998)
- 6 February – Maurice Beresford, historian and archaeologist (died 2005)
- 10 February – Alex Comfort, physician and scientist (died 2000)
- 16 February – Tony Crook, racing driver (died 2014)
- 17 February – Ronald Butt, journalist (died 2002)
- 19 February – George Rose, actor (died 1988)
- 21 February – Logan Scott-Bowden, army general (died 2014)
- 25 February – Antony Duff, diplomat (died 2000)
- 26 February
  - Derek Goodwin, ornithologist (died 2008)
  - Kenneth Hubbard, RAF pilot (died 2004)
- 27 February – Reg Simpson, cricketer (died 2013)
- 2 March – George Cowling, weatherman (died 2009)
- 3 March
  - Ronald Searle, cartoonist (died 2011)
  - Sydney Templeman, Baron Templeman, judge and law lord (died 2014)
- 5 March – Rachel Gurney, actress (died 2001)
- 6 March – Lewis Gilbert, film director (died 2018)
- 9 March
  - Michael Brock, historian (died 2014)
  - Alison Robins, military communications listener (died 2017)
- 11 March – D. J. Enright, academic, poet, novelist and critic (died 2002)
- 14 March – Dorothy Tyler-Odam, high jumper (died 2014)
- 17 March – John Ehrman, historian (died 2011)
- 19 March – Jack Odell, inventor of Matchbox Toys (died 2007)
- 20 March
  - Pamela Harriman, née Digby, socialite, dipliomat and political activist in the United States (died 1997)
  - Edwin Hunt, waterman, Queen's Bargemaster (died 2022)
  - Dudley Savage, theatre organist (died 2008)
  - Rosemary Timperley, fiction writer (died 1988)
- 22 March – Fanny Waterman, pianist and musical educator (died 2020)
- 23 March – Barbara Low, biochemist (died 2019)
- 25 March
  - Paul Scott, novelist, playwright and poet (died 1978)
  - Patrick Troughton, actor (died 1987)
- 27 March – Robin Jacques, illustrator (died 1995)
- 31 March – Deborah Cavendish, Duchess of Devonshire, aristocrat, writer and socialite (died 2014)
- March – Walter Smith, land surveyor (died 2018)

=== April – June ===
- 2 April – Jack Stokes, animation director (died 2013)
- 5 April – Arthur Hailey, novelist (died 2004)
- 9 April – Alex Moulton, mechanical engineer and inventor (died 2012)
- 11 April – Peter O'Donnell, fiction and comic strip writer (died 2010)
- 14 April – Ivor Forbes Guest, historian of dance (died 2018)
- 16 April – Alan Pegler, English businessman (died 2012)
- 17 April – Arnold Yarrow, actor (died 2024)
- 18 April – Roy Paul, Welsh footballer (died 2002)
- 21 April – Ronald Magill, actor (died 2007)
- 23 April – Eric Yarrow, businessman (died 2018)
- 27 April – Edwin Morgan, Scottish poet and translator (died 2010)
- 28 April – Hugh Bentall, surgeon (died 2012)
- 30 April
  - Alexander Lamb Cullen, electrical engineer (died 2013)
  - Tom Moore, World War II soldier and NHS fundraiser (died 2021)
  - William Ralph Turner, painter (died 2013)
- 2 May – Joe "Mr Piano" Henderson, Scottish pianist, composer and broadcaster (died 1980)
- 4 May – Ronald Chesney, harmonica player and comedy scriptwriter (died 2018)
- 5 May – Glanmor Williams, geographer (died 2005)
- 9 May – Michael Dauncey, brigadier (died 2017)
- 10 May
  - Richard Adams, novelist (died 2016)
  - Helen Crummy, social activist (died 2011)
  - Bert Weedon, guitarist and composer (died 2012)
- 13 May – Gareth Morris, flautist (died 2007)
- 16 May – Geoffrey Page, air ace (died 2000)
- 18 May – Anthony Storr, psychiatrist and author (died 2001)
- 20 May
  - William Bulmer, businessman (died 2012)
  - Betty Driver, actress (died 2011)
- 21 May
  - John Chadwick, cryptanalyst and classical scholar (died 1998)
  - Anthony Steel, actor (died 2001)
- 23 May – P. N. Furbank, writer and literary critic (died 2014)
- 28 May – Jim Russell, racing driver (died 2019)
- 30 May – Reginald Harland, Royal Air Force commander (died 2013)
- 2 June – Johnny Speight, television comedy scriptwriter (died 1998)
- 6 June – Aubrey Richards, actor (died 2000)
- 9 June – Sheila Keith, actress (died 2004)
- 11 June – Diana Armfield, artist
- 12 June – Peter Jones, actor (died 2000)
- 17 June
  - Patrick Duffy, Labour politician and economist (died 2026)
  - John Waddy, British Army colonel (died 2020)
- 18 June – Ian Carmichael, actor (died 2010)
- 19 June
  - Johnny Douglas, composer and musician (died 2003)
  - Geoffrey Lewis, Turkologist (died 2008)
- 22 June – Marea Hartman, athletics administrator (died 1994)
- 23 June – Henry Chadwick, theologian (died 2008)
- 24 June – John Coplans, artist, curator and museum director (died 2003)
- 28 June
  - Reginald Coates, civil engineer (died 2004)
  - Clarissa Eden, born Clarissa Spencer-Churchill, wife of Prime Minister Anthony Eden (died 2021)
  - Irene Thomas, radio personality (died 2001)

=== July – September ===
- 1 July – Geoffrey Lees, cricketer (died 2012)
- 2 July – Annette Kerr, actress (died 2013)
- 4 July – Anthony Barber, Conservative politician (died 2005)
- 10 July – Leslie Porter, businessman (died 2005)
- 12 July – Randolph Quirk, linguist (died 2017)
- 13 July – Bill Towers, footballer (died 2000)
- 14 July – Tom Neil, RAF pilot (died 2018)
- 17 July – Kenneth Wolstenholme, sports commentator (died 2002)
- 19 July – George Dawkes, cricketer (died 2006)
- 20 July – Jasper Blackall, racing yachtsman (died unknown)
- 21 July – John Horsley, actor (died 2014)
- 24 July
  - Tamar Eshel, Israeli diplomat and politician (died 2022)
  - Toby Graham, Olympic cross country skier and university professor (died 2013)
  - Charles Suckling, biochemist (died 2013)
- 25 July – Rosalind Franklin, crystallographer (died 1958)
- 29 July – Jack Richardson, chemical engineer (died 2011)
- 30 July
  - Bob Cobbing, poet (died 2002)
  - Michael Crawford, cricketer (died 2012)
  - Lady Brigid Guinness, nurse and noblewoman (died 1995)
- 31 July – Peter Thomas, politician (died 2008)
- 2 August – Hugh Hickling, lawyer, colonial civil servant (died 2007)
- 3 August
  - Norman Dewis, test driver and development engineer (died 2019)
  - P. D. James, writer of crime fiction (died 2014)
  - Hugh Lunghi, military interpreter (died 2014)
- 10 August – Tony Tenser, film producer (died 2007)
- 12 August – Peter West, sports commentator (died 2003)
- 13 August – Forbes Howie, businessman (died 2000)
- 15 August – Glyn Gilbert, major-general (died 2003)
- 17 August – Emrys Jones, geographer (died 2006)
- 18 August – David Lacy-Scott, amateur cricketer (died 2020)
- 19 August – Hugh Manning, actor (died 2004)
- 21 August – Christopher Robin Milne, author and bookseller (died 1996)
- 23 August – W. I. B. Crealock, yacht designer (died 2009)
- 27 August
  - Michael Giddings, air marshal (died 2009)
  - James Molyneaux, Ulster Unionist Party leader (died 2015)
  - Peter Vansittart, writer (died 2008)
- 3 September – Les Medley, footballer (died 2001)
- 6 September – Trevor Morris, footballer (died 2003)
- 7 September – Brian Pippard, physicist (died 2008)
- 9 September – Michael Aldridge, actor (died 1994)
- 12 September – Cornel Lucas, photographer (died 2012)
- 17 September – Dinah Sheridan, actress (died 2012)
- 21 September – Kenneth McAlpine, English racing driver (died 2023)
- 22 September – Nathaniel Fiennes, 21st Baron Saye and Sele, peer and businessman (died 2024)
- 24 September – Leo Marks, author and cryptographer (died 2001)
- 27 September – Alan A. Freeman, record producer (died 1985)
- 29 September – Peter D. Mitchell, chemist, Nobel Prize laureate (died 1992)

=== October – December ===
- 1 October – David Jamieson, Army officer (died 2001)
- 2 October – Norman Whiting, cricketer (died 2014)
- 3 October
  - Philippa Foot, née Bosanquet, philosopher (died 2010)
  - Philip Knights, Baron Knights, police officer and life peer (died 2014)
- 5 October
  - Ronald Leigh-Hunt, actor (died 2005)
  - Richard Wood, Baron Holderness, politician (died 2002)
- 8 October – Alf Bellis, footballer (died 2013)
- 9 October – Michael Shaw, Baron Shaw of Northstead, politician (died 2021)
- 12 October
  - Steve Conway, singer (died 1952)
  - Eric Shilling, opera singer and producer (died 2006)
- 13 October – Donald Russell, classicist (died 2020)
- 15 October – Daniel Everett, RAF pilot (killed in action 1945)
- 16 October – Arthur Worsley, ventriloquist (died 2001)
- 18 October – Alexander Young, operatic tenor (died 2000)
- 19 October – Harry Alan Towers, film producer and screenwriter (died 2009)
- 25 October – J. Denis Summers-Smith, ornithologist and tribologist (died 2020)
- 31 October – Dick Francis, steeplechase jockey and crime novelist (died 2010)
- 1 November – Ted Lowe, snooker commentator (died 2011)
- 3 November
  - Ursula Dronke, medievalist (died 2012)
  - William Goodreds, cricketer (died 2014)
  - John Westcott, computer scientist (died 2014)
- 4 November – Peter Ayerst, World War II RAF fighter and test pilot (died 2014)
- 5 November – Tommy Godwin, cyclist (died 2012)
- 11 November – Roy Jenkins, politician (died 2003)
- 13 November – Ian Gourlay, Army general (died 2013)
- 15 November
  - Colin Collindridge, footballer (died 2019)
  - Daphne Pochin Mould, author and photographer (died 2014)
- 16 November – Laurence Stark, World War II air ace (died 2004)
- 18 November – Jerry Roberts, codebreaker and businessman (died 2014)
- 20 November – Ian McHarg, architect (died 2001)
- 22 November – Anne Crawford, film actress, in Mandatory Palestine (died 1956)
- 25 November
  - Shelagh Fraser, actress (died 2000)
  - Bernard Weatherill, politician and Speaker of the House of Commons (died 2007)
- 27 November – Buster Merryfield, character actor (died 1999)
- 28 November
  - Cecilia Colledge, Olympic figure skater (died 2008)
  - Ethel Lote, English World War II nurse and yoga instructor (died 2024).
  - Patrick Rodger, Scottish-born Anglican bishop (died 2002)
- 3 December – Sheila K. McCullagh, author (died 2014)
- 6 December – George Porter, chemist, Nobel Prize laureate (died 2002)
- 7 December – Frank Taylor, sports journalist (died 2002)
- 10 December – Alfred Goldie, mathematician (died 2005)
- 11 December – William Elliott, Baron Elliott of Morpeth, politician (died 2011)
- 12 December – Dick James, singer and record producer (died 1986)
- 14 December – Rosemary Sutcliff, novelist (died 1992)
- 16 December
  - Les Leston, racing car driver (died 2012)
  - David Seely, 4th Baron Mottistone, naval officer and life peer (died 2011)
- 18 December
  - Ian Edward Fraser, World War II sailor (died 2008)
  - Merlyn Rees, Labour politician, Home Secretary (died 2006)
- 23 December – Tim Elkington, RAF pilot (died 2019)
- 24 December – John Barron, actor (died 2004)
- 30 December – David Fraser, Army general (died 2012)

== Deaths ==
- 6 January – Walter Cunliffe, 1st Baron Cunliffe, banker (born 1856)
- 11 January – Pryce Pryce-Jones, Welsh entrepreneur (born 1834)
- 18 January – John McClure, admiral in the Imperial Chinese Navy (born 1837)
- 24 January – William Plunket, 5th Baron Plunket, diplomat and administrator (born 1864)
- 7 February – Dollie Radford, poet (born 1858)
- 19 February – Ernest Hartley Coleridge, literary scholar and poet (born 1846)
- 13 March – Charles Lapworth, geologist (born 1842)
- 15 March – Edith Holden, nature artist, drowned (born 1871)
- 21 March – Evelina Haverfield, suffragette (born 1867)
- 26 March – Mary Augusta Ward (Mrs. Humphry Ward), novelist (born 1851 in Tasmania)
- 14 April – John George Bartholomew, cartographer (born 1860)
- 17 April – Alex Higgins, Scottish international footballer (born 1863)
- 20 April – Briton Rivière, painter (born 1840)
- 7 May – Hugh Thomson, illustrator (born 1860)
- 14 May – Ronald Montagu Burrows, archaeologist (born 1867)
- 18 May – Frank Matcham, theatrical architect and designer (born 1854)
- 28 May – Hardwicke Rawnsley, clergyman, hymnodist and conservationist (born 1851)
- 4 June – John Bruce Glasier, Scottish-born socialist politician (born 1859)
- 5 June – Rhoda Broughton, novelist (born 1840)
- 10 July – John ("Jackie") Fisher, 1st Baron Fisher, admiral (born 1841)
- 17 July – Sir Edmund Elton, 8th Baronet, studio potter (born 1846)
- 2 August – George W. Anson, actor (born 1847)
- 10 August – Erskine Beveridge, textile manufacturer and antiquarian (born 1851)
- 16 August – Sir Norman Lockyer, astronomer and science editor (born 1836)
- 5 October – William Heinemann, publisher (born 1863)
- 17 October – Reginald Farrer, botanist, in China (born 1880)
- 24 October – Grand Duchess Maria Alexandrovna of Russia (Duchess of Edinburgh), member of the royal family, in Switzerland (born 1853)
- 23 November – Sir George Callaghan, admiral (born 1852)
- 3 December – William de Wiveleslie Abney, astronomer and photographer (born 1843)
- 20 December – Linton Hope, Olympic yachtsman and yacht and aircraft designer (born 1863)

== See also ==
- List of British films of 1920
- The Troubles in Ulster (1920–1922)
