= UFS =

UFS may refer to:

== Computing ==
- Universal Flash Storage
- Unix File System
- Unsupervised Forward Selection, a data reduction algorithm

== Other ==
- UFS (trade union), former trade union in the United Kingdom
- United Family Services
- United Feature Syndicate, commonly known as United Media
- United Feeder Service, a company formerly part of the United Express carrier network
- Universal Fighting System, a collectible card game
- Universidade Federal de Sergipe, a Brazilian public university
- University of the Free State, in South Africa
- UFS the stock ticker for Domtar
