= Mountain baronets =

Baronetcy in the Baronetage of the United Kingdom

Mountain baronets, of Oare Manor and Brendon
- Blazon: Arms: Issuant from the battlements of a tower Proper a demi lion guardant Argent holding between the paws an escallop Gules.; Crest: Ermine on a fess Azure between three lions rampant guardant Sable each holding between the forepaws an escallop Gules three cross crosslets Argent.; Motto: Cum cruce salus
- Creation date: 23 January 1922

The Mountain Baronetcy, of Oare Manor in the County of Somerset and Brendon in the County of Devon, is a title in the Baronetage of the United Kingdom. It was created on 23 January 1922 for Edward Mountain. He was Chairman of Eagle Star & British Dominions Insurance Company Limited (which later became Eagle Star Insurance Company Ltd). The second Baronet (Sir Brian Mountain Bt.) succeeded Sir Edward as Chairman of Eagle Star Insurance Company Ltd. The third Baronet also became Chairman of Eagle Star Insurance Company Ltd.

== Mountain baronets, of Oare Manor and Brendon (1922) ==
- Sir Edward Mortimer Mountain, 1st Baronet (1872–1948)
- Sir Brian Edward Stanley Mountain, 2nd Baronet (1899–1977)
- Sir Denis Mortimer Mountain, 3rd Baronet (1929–2005)
- Sir Edward Brian Stanford Mountain, 4th Baronet (born 1961)

The heir apparent is the present holder's son Thomas Denis Edward Mountain (born 1989).
