= 1920 blind march =

Political protest in the United Kingdom

Photograph of the march in the Daily Sketch newspaper

The 1920 blind march was a protest march from across the United Kingdom to London of 250 blind people. It was organised by the National League of the Blind (NLB) to protest poor working conditions and poverty experienced by blind people. In particular the NLB raised concerns over the conditions in workshops run to provide employment to the visually impaired by various charities.

The marchers assembled at Newport, Manchester and Leeds on 5 April and marched to London, assembling at Trafalgar Square on 25 April. They were greeted by a crowd of 10,000 who listened to speeches from Herbert Morrison and trade union leaders. The march leaders met with prime minister David Lloyd George on 30 April, who made few promises apart from to pay for the marchers' rail tickets home.

A subsequent Blind Persons Act 1920, the first disability-specific legislation in the world, compelled local authorities to ensure the welfare of blind persons and reduced the pension age for blind men. The march served as inspiration for the more famous 1936 Jarrow March against unemployment, in which the NLB also participated.

== Background ==
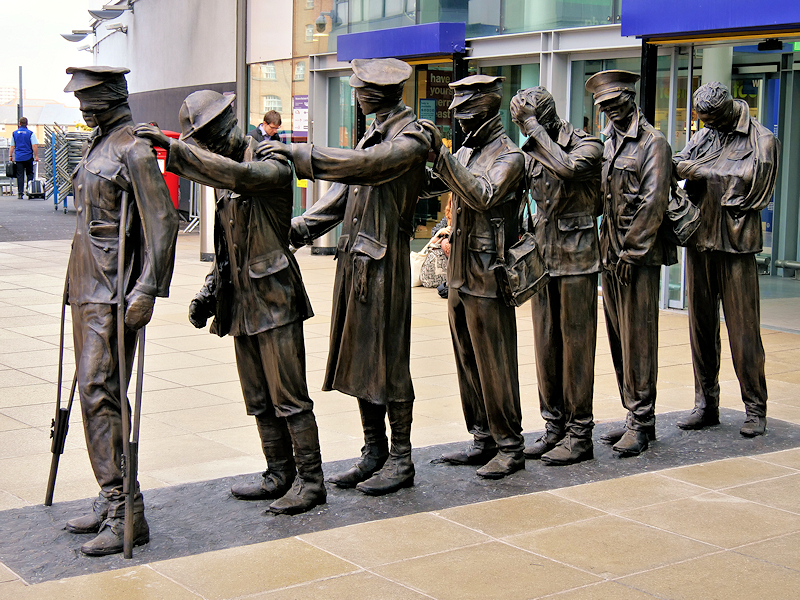
Depiction of a column of blinded soldiers, Manchester

A trade union and pressure group, the National League of the Blind (NLB), was founded in 1894 to campaign for the rights of visually impaired persons; a founder-member, Ben Purse, became its first general secretary in 1897. At this time many blind people were reliant on low paid work in charity factories under poor conditions. The charities were often controlling over their employees including restricting if they could marry. It was also alleged that too much of the charities' funds was spent on sighted employees.

The NLB had little success in furthering the welfare of blind people in the years preceding the First World War, though it held its first strike in Bristol in 1912. After the First World War, in the course of which many servicemen were blinded by poison gas or shells, many blind people were living in poor conditions. The NLB estimated that 20,000 out of the 35,000 blind people in the United Kingdom were in poverty. The NLB held a large meeting at Trafalgar Square in 1918 and disrupted a session of the House of Commons in 1919. Later that year the house failed to pass a bill proposed by Labour member of parliament Ben Tillett, the third attempt to introduce legislation to improve the welfare of blind people. The NLB responded by calling for a march to demand more rights for blind people and fairer working conditions.

== March ==
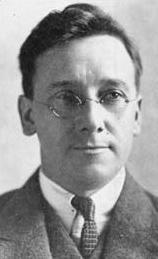
Herbert Morrison

The NLB decided that only men would be permitted to join the march as conditions on the route were expected to be poor. Additionally, though it had many members who were veterans of the British Army, it was decided that they would not march as the union did not want patriotic sympathy to be cited as the reason for its success. The marchers would be ill-equipped, carrying only their white canes and with no change of clothes or provisions. This may have been a deliberate move by the NLB to portray the marchers as vulnerable and disprove the popular perception that the charities were looking after them well. The march was led by Purse, David Lawley (the NLB North West organiser) and Patrick Neary (the Dublin branch secretary).

The march began on Easter Monday, 5 April 1920 from Newport, Manchester and Leeds. The 37 Newport marchers were drawn from Wales and South West England, the 60 assembled at Manchester came from Ireland and North West England and the 74 at Leeds from Scotland and North East England. The Newport group marched via Abergavenny and Worcester, meeting the Manchester group, who had marched through Stafford and Wolverhampton, at Birmingham. The combined group then marched to Leicester to meet with the Leeds marchers who had travelled via Sheffield and Nottingham. After joining at Leicester on 15 April the group marched through Market Harborough to reach Northampton and Wellingborough on 17 April and Luton on 20 April. They had grown to 250 in number by the time the march arrived at London's Trafalgar Square on 25 April, where they were greeted by a crowd of 10,000 people.

The marchers carried banners reading "social justice not charity" and were accompanied by music played on drums, toy trumpets and mouth organs. The men marched arm in arm and four abreast or else held onto a rope to avoid getting separated. Sighted guides marched with them and directed the men by means of whistles or shouted signals. In some municipalities the local police provided an escort for the marchers, others put on buses to transport the men. The marchers took a train between Stone and Stafford due to poor weather. The men found accommodation on the route, provided by trade unions and cooperative societies and in some instances, were allowed to sleep in police cells.

Some towns and cities provided a formal reception for the march with ceremonies attended by local dignitaries and with music from brass bands. In Trafalgar Square Labour Party politician Herbert Morrison and union leaders addressed the crowd whilst the marchers stood on the steps of the National Gallery.

== Aftermath ==
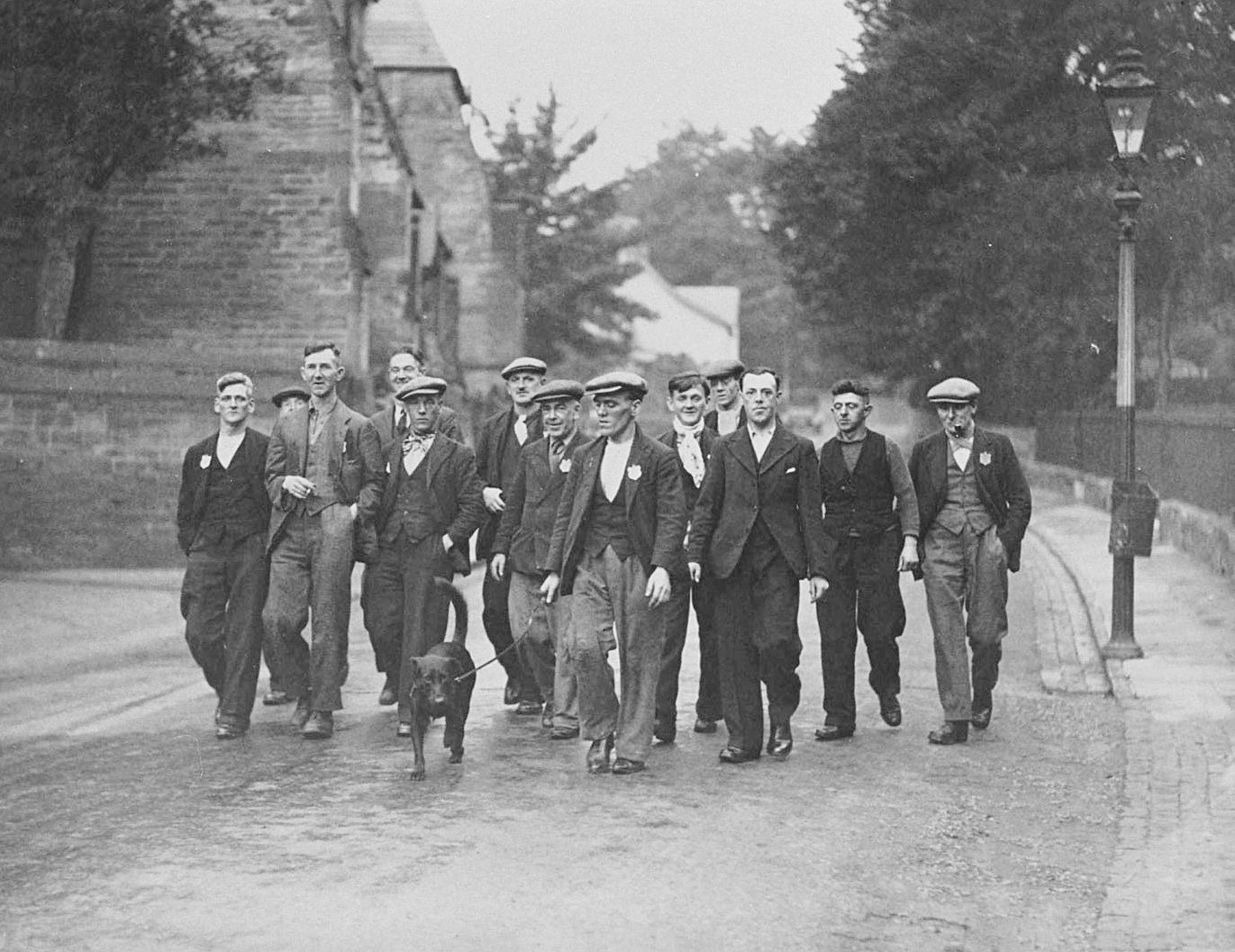
Some of the 1936 Jarrow March participants

The marchers requested a meeting with the prime minister, David Lloyd George, which they claimed he had promised them in July 1919. Lloyd George initially declined to meet them, offering the Lord Privy Seal and his effective deputy Bonar Law. The marchers refused this offer and said they would remain in London until they could meet with Lloyd George. While they waited they were invited to take tea at the House of Commons with Lady Astor. Lloyd George eventually relented and met, on 30 April, with Lawley, Neary, Purse and Charles Lothian. The prime minister claimed that his budget was limited, due to the costs of the war, and he could not meet their demands of better education, more work opportunities and a financial grant to all blind persons. The government would instead progress the Blind Persons Act and pay for rail tickets for the marchers to return home. Though similar legislation had been debated before the march, both the Royal National Institute of Blind People (RNIB) and historian Francis Salt writing in 2017 say the new act was a direct result of the 1920 NLB protest.

Though the march did not achieve all of its aims it has been described by the BBC as "a milestone in the history of the disability rights movement". The Blind Persons Act 1920 was the first disability-specific legislation anywhere in the world. The act required local authorities to "promote the welfare of blind persons" and reduced the pension age for blind men from 70 to 50. The NLB feared that the act would simply allow local authorities to sub-contract their responsibilities to the charities that they opposed. The NLB later passed a motion of dissatisfaction in the government's response to the march. Purse changed his views and became more favourable to the charities, this was not compatible with the NLB's position and he left the organisation in 1920, founding the National Union of the Industrial and Professional Blind (which continues, as of 2020, as the National Federation of the Blind advocacy group).

The march helped inspire the more famous, but less successful, 1936 Jarrow March against unemployment. The NLB joined the 1936 Jarrow March to highlight the plight of unemployment among blind people which had reached 35,000 out of 40,000 during the Great Depression. The NLB merged with the Iron and Steel Trades Confederation in 2000 and is now part of the trade union Community. The RNIB marked the centenary of the march in April 2020. Though their plans were curtailed because of the COVID-19 pandemic the RNIB urged people to use their daily permitted exercise during the virus control lockdown to take steps significant to them and record it on social media.
