= Charlie Stubbs =

Charlie, Charles or Chuck Stubbs may refer to:

- Charlie Stubbs (Coronation Street), a character on the British soap opera Coronation Street
- Charlie Stubbs (American football) (born 1955), American college football coach
- Charlie Stubbs (footballer) (1920–1984), English footballer
- Charles Stubbs (1845–1912), English clergyman
