= Ben Purse =

British campaigner for blind welfare

Ben Purse OBE
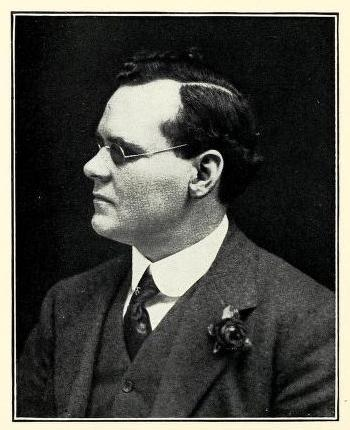

President of the National League of the Blind
- In office 1918–1920
- Preceded by: R. D. Smith
- Succeeded by: David B. Lawley

President of the National League of the Blind
- In office 1905–1916
- Preceded by: First office holder
- Succeeded by: R. D. Smith

General Secretary of the National League of the Blind
- In office 1897–1899
- Preceded by: First office holder
- Succeeded by: Peter Miller

Personal details
- Born: 29 August 1874 Salford, Lancashire
- Died: 31 March 1950 (aged 75) Bridgwater, Somerset
- Domestic partner: Mary Elizabeth Alcock
- Occupation: Trade union leader, campaigner for blind people's rights

Benjamin Ormond Purse OBE (29 August 1874 – 31 March 1950) was a British trade unionist and campaigner for the rights of blind people. Purse, who was completely blind by the age of 13, was a piano tuner. He became a founder-member of the National League of the Blind (NLB) in 1894 and was elected as its first general secretary in 1897. Purse held the position for two years, during which he founded its journal the Blind Advocate. Purse became president of the NLB in 1905 and held the position until 1916. He was regarded as particularly energetic in this role, successfully negotiating concessionary travel for blind people with 37 municipal authorities, attending an international conference and giving evidence to the 1907 Royal Commission on the Poor Laws. The early NLB had been a combative organisation, confronting charities that it claimed exploited blind workers, but Purse put it on more conciliatory footing, that won it support from key political figures.

Purse campaigned for neonatal conjunctivitis to become a notifiable disease, which was achieved in 1914 and in the same year joined a government committee that helped influence the bill that became the Blind Persons Act 1920. Purse became a founder-member of the government's Advisory Committee for the Welfare of the Blind in 1917 and held that role for 25 years.

The NLB split in 1921 over the question of whether it should register as a charity and Purse left to found the National Union of Industrial and Professional Blind, which later became the National Association of Blind Workers. He was editor of the new organisation's journal, the Tribune until 1942. Purse published two books on blind people's welfare in the 1920s and, in 1931, a book of verse. He was appointed an Officer of the Order of the British Empire in the 1944 New Year Honours.

== Early life ==
Ben Purse was born in Salford, Lancashire on 29 August 1874 to Edward Purse, a general labourer, and Matilda Purse (née Clavering). He was born with a visual impairment and was completely blind by the age of 13. Purse trained as a piano tuner at Henshaw's Blind Asylum in Old Trafford, but struggled to find work. Purse determined upon a career as a professional or a public servant and in 1894 became a founder-member of the National League of the Blind (NLB). The NLB had been founded to campaign against the exploitation of blind workers by companies and charities and for the government to take over responsibility for blind persons welfare from the charities.

== National League of the Blind ==
Purse was elected general secretary of the NLB in 1897, the organisation's first full time leader. Purse organised the NLB's first national congress in 1897 and remained general secretary until 1899. Purse inherited £60 in 1898 and used it to found the NLB's journal, the Blind Advocate, of which he was its first editor. He married in 1899 to Mary Elizabeth Alcock. Purse became a fulltime employee of the NLB in 1901 and served for a long period as the body's national organiser. His large social network was a great help in this role, one contemporary commentator recalled that it "was rare to find a blind person whom Purse did not know". Purse argued for the NLB to become affiliated with the Trades Union Congress, which was achieved in 1902, and campaigned for a minimum wage for blind workers.

Purse became president of the NLB in 1905, serving continuously until 1916. He was particularly energetic in this role, visiting 48 municipal authorities by 1910 to campaign for concessionary travel for blind people (he was successful in 37 of them) and attending an international conference on blind worker's welfare in 1905. In 1907 Purse was the only witness to give evidence on behalf of blind people at the Royal Commission on the Poor Laws. The NLB became affiliated to the Labour Party in 1909. The NLB was originally highly combative in its campaigning but from 1910 Purse adopted a more conciliatory approach, which helped to increase its influence and draw support from key political figures. The NLB held a number of strikes by blind workers including one in Bristol in 1912 that lasted for six months. Purse was key in a campaign that led to neonatal conjunctivitis, which could lead to blindness in newborn babies, becoming a notifiable disease in 1914.

From 1914 Purse was a member of a government interdepartmental committee that helped influence the wording of the bill that would become the Blind Persons Act 1920. From 1917 he was also a founding member of the Advisory Committee for the Welfare of the Blind, a government body, and remained in that role until 1942. Purse's cooperation with the government led to some complaints in the NLB's journal, the Blind Advocate. One member W. Halkyard wrote to say Purse was "a former comrade influenced through personal gain and was now on the side of the opponents". Purse responded by calling Halkyard "mischievous and inaccurate" and that his intention was only to increase his stature in the NLB by criticising others. Purse was persuaded by Sir Arthur Pearson in 1916 to accept employment as director of aftercare at the National Institute for the Blind, helping to train blind people and find opportunities for them in the workplace. He remained in the role until 1943. Purse became president of the NLB again in 1918, holding the position for two years.

Participants of the 1920 blind march

Purse was a leader of the 1920 blind march, a march to London by blind people campaigning for more rights and fairer working conditions. Purse was part of a delegation that met with the prime minister, David Lloyd George, after the march. Lloyd George stated that the government could not afford to meet all of the demands of the marchers, but he would progress the Blind Persons Act. The act was first read in Parliament on 26 April 1920 and received Royal Assent on 16 August, becoming the first disability-specific legislation anywhere in the world.

== Later career ==
From 1920 to 1921, the NLB membership was split over whether the organisation should register as a charity, in addition to its status as a trade union, which had recently been ruled acceptable by the courts. The NLB had long opposed the existing blind people's charities and many in the membership thought that registration would be hypocritical. The NLB chose not to register but to continue solely as a trade union. Purse left the NLB in 1921 to found a new organisation, the National Union of Industrial and Professional Blind (later the National Association of Blind Workers), which adopted a more co-operative approach with blind charities. He was editor of the union's journal, the Tribune, until 1942. Purse published The Blind in Industry in 1925; The British Blind, arguing for more self-help and less state interference in blind persons' lives, in 1928; and Moods and Melodies, a book of verse, in 1931. In 1942 he was elected vice-president of his old school, now called Henshaw's Institution. Purse was appointed an Officer of the Order of the British Empire in the 1944 New Year Honours "for devoted service to the blind".

Purse died at Bridgwater, Somerset on 31 March 1950; his wife and their two children predeceased him. The NLB became the National League of the Blind and Disabled in 1968. It merged with the Iron and Steel Trades Confederation in 2000 and is now part of Community. The National Association of Blind Workers became the National Federation of the Blind of the United Kingdom after the Second World War, registered as a charity in 1964 and continues to campaign for blind people's welfare.
