= Old Age Pensions Act 1908 =

Act of the Parliament of the United Kingdom

Old Age Pensions Act 1908 (Note: Section 12(2).)
- Act of Parliament
- Parliament of the United Kingdom
- Long title: An Act to provide for Old-Age Pensions.
- Citation: 8 Edw. 7. c. 40
- Territorial extent: United Kingdom

Dates
- Royal assent: 1 August 1908
- Commencement: 1 January 1909 (Note: Section 12(2).)
- Repealed: England and Wales and Scotland: 1 January 1937; Northern Ireland:
Other legislation
Amended by	Old Age Pensions Act 1911; Old Age Pensions Act 1924; Widows', Orphans' and Old Age Contributory Pensions Act 1929
Repealed by	England and Wales and Scotland: Old Age Pensions Act 1936

Status: Repealed

Text of statute as originally enacted

Old Age Pensions Act 1924 (Note: Section 2(1).)
- Act of Parliament
- Parliament of the United Kingdom
- Long title: An Act to amend paragraph (3) of section two of the Old Age Pensions Act, 1908.
- Citation: 14 & 15 Geo. 5. c. 33
- Territorial extent: England and Wales; Scotland; (Note: Section 2(2).)

Dates
- Royal assent: 7 August 1924
- Commencement: 7 August 1924 (Note: The Acts of Parliament (Commencement) Act 1793.)
- Repealed: 1 January 1937
Other legislation
Amends	Old Age Pensions Act 1908
Repealed by	Old Age Pensions Act 1936

Status: Repealed

Text of statute as originally enacted

The Old Age Pensions Act 1908 (8 Edw. 7. c. 40) was an act of the Parliament of the United Kingdom, passed in 1908. The act is one of the foundations of modern social welfare in the present-day United Kingdom and the Irish Republic. It forms part of the wider welfare reforms of the Liberal government of 1906–1914.

Successful single claimants over the age of seventy were paid five shillings a week, while couples in which the husband was aged over seventy got seven shillings and sixpence per week.

== History ==
A royal commission (1893-1895) chaired by Lord Aberdare investigated the viability of old age pensions, but issued an adverse verdict for economic reasons. A second committee (1896-1898) chaired by Lord Rothschild gave an adverse verdict on setting up an old age pension. A 1899 committee reported favorably on establishing old age pensions for those above the age of 65. A number of bills were introduced in Parliament between 1900 and 1907, and in March 1906 the House of Commons unanimously approved a resolution calling for the introduction of universal old-age pensions.

The Old Age Pensions Act 1908 was passed in Parliament on May 7, 1908 in H. H. Asquith's budget.

The voting on the legislation established the Old Age Pensions Act mostly occurred along party lines. In the Second Reading of the bill, which took place on the 16th of June 1908, 325 Liberal and Labour members voted for the measure while 2 were opposed and 64 abstained. Additionally, 30 L.R.C. and Socialist members voted for the measure while 2 abstained. By contrast, 61 Nationalists abstained while only 22 voted for the measure, and on the Unionist side only 42 voted in favour, while 29 voted against and 91 abstained. Similarly, in the Third Reading, 258 Liberal and Labour members, together with 47 Nationalists, voted in favour, while 1 Liberal (Harold Cox) voted against. Amongst Unionists, only 12 voted in favour of the measure, while 11 voted against and 140 abstained.

== Provisions ==
The act provided for a non-contributory old age pension for people over the age of seventy, with the cost being borne by taxpayers generally. It was enacted in 1908 and was to pay a weekly pension of 5s (7s 6d for married couples) with effect from 1 January 1909. The level of benefit was deliberately set low – the approximate equivalent of £23 for unmarried pensioners and £37 for married pensioners in 21st century terms – to encourage workers to go on making their own provision for retirement.

In order to be eligible, claimants had to be over the age of 70, have been a British subject for 20 years and have resided in Great Britain and Ireland for at least twenty years. It was open to both men and women, both married and single, their "yearly means" not exceeding £31 10s. Only those with a 'good character' could receive the pensions. Others excluded from receiving the new pension were those in receipt of poor relief, those being held in what were then called 'lunatic asylums', those who had served a prison sentence and been released less than ten years before, those convicted of drunkenness (at the discretion of the court), and any person who was guilty of ‘habitual failure to work’, according to ability.

== Implementation ==
The pension was due to be paid from 1 January 1909, and those eligible had to apply to a local pension committee starting in October 1908 set up by the county councils. Forms for applicants were available from the end of September 1908 and had to be returned to the postmaster of the post office that would pay the individual's benefit. The claims were assessed by the pension officers and then sent to the local pension committee for approval.

On 31 December 1908 a total of 596,038 pensions had been granted:

Rate	England (excluding Monmouthshire)	Wales (including Monmouthshire)	Scotland	Ireland
5s	297,332	19,691	60,787	161,578
4s	15,178	864	1,443	3,101
3s	14,830	805	1,488	3,131
2s	7,185	362	656	1,628
1s	4,423	234	395	927
Totals	338,948	21,956	64,769	170,365

== Effects ==
A 2026 study found the law led to a reduction in elderly mortality in England and Wales.

Initially, most of the recipients of the pension benefit were women. In order to remove any stigma in receiving the benefit, the scheme was administered by the Post Office rather than the existing social welfare agencies such as the parish or Poor Law.

As Winston Churchill (with David Lloyd George a major social reformer of the era) said of the pension level, "It is not much unless you have not got it". Flora Thompson, who helped administer the first Post Office payouts, has movingly recorded the relief and gratitude of the first recipients: "'God bless that Lord George and God bless you, miss!' and there were flowers from their gardens and apples from their trees for the girl who merely handed them the money".

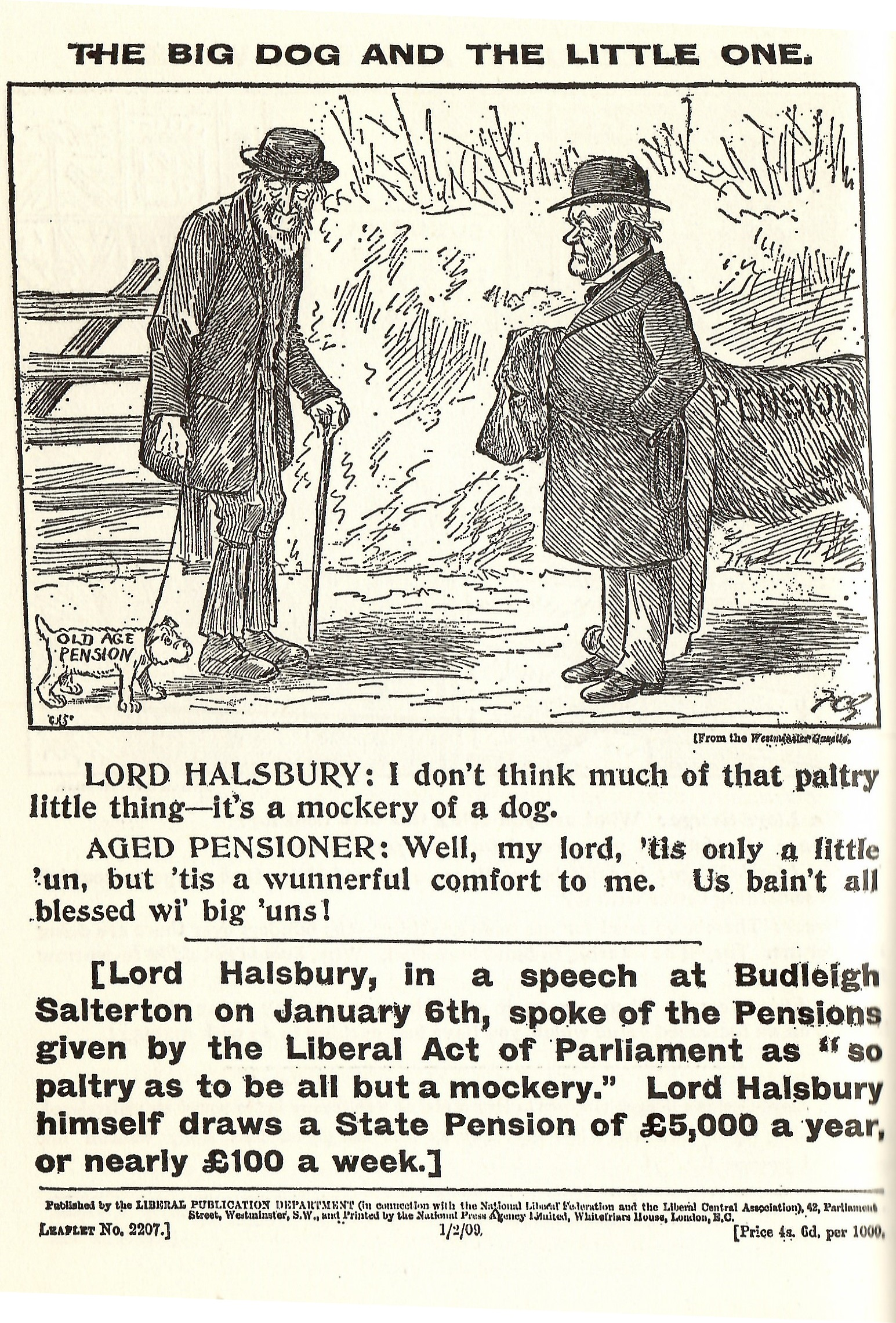
UK Liberal Party poster in 1909 defends new old age pension shown as a little dog while the rich aristocratic landlord has a huge pension (shown as a very large dog).

== Subsequent developments ==
The whole act was repealed by section 14 of, and the second schedule to, the Old Age Pensions Act 1936 (26 Geo. 5 & 1 Edw. 8. c. 31), which came into force on 1 January 1937.

== See also ==
- National Insurance Act 1911
- Pension provision in the United Kingdom
- Timeline of pensions in the United Kingdom
- History of the welfare state in the United Kingdom
- Liberal welfare reforms

=== State pensions acts ===
- Widows', Orphans' and Old Age Contributory Pensions Act 1925
- National Insurance Act 1946
- National Insurance Act 1965
- Social Security Contributions and Benefits Act 1992

=== Private pensions acts ===
- Superannuation and other Funds (Validation) Act 1992
- Pension Schemes Act 1993
- Pensions Act 1995
- Pensions Act 2004
- Pensions Act 2007
- Pensions Act 2008
