= Edward Mountain =

Sir Edward Mortimer Mountain, 1st Baronet (1872–1948) was the founder of Eagle Star Insurance which became one of the largest insurance companies in the United Kingdom.

== Career ==
Educated at Dulwich College, Edward Mountain initially joined a Lloyd's underwriting firm. He later established his own broking firm, Hawley Mountain, which, following a merger, became Gardner Mountain.

In 1904 he acquired the marine insurance business of British Dominions Insurance and formed British Dominions Marine Insurance Company. He then established a reputation for himself by refusing to insure the RMS Titanic on her maiden voyage. During 1916 and 1917 he acquired, in quick succession, the Eagle, Sceptre and Star Insurance Companies integrating them with his own business to create Eagle & British Dominions, which grew to become one of the largest insurance companies in the United Kingdom.

He was knighted in 1918 and made a baronet in 1922.

During 1934 he organized a search for the Loch Ness Monster.

He died in 1948 at Dunkeld House in Perthshire.

== Family ==
In 1897 he married Evelyn Ellen Regina Seigle (died 1950) and together they went on to have one son, Brian Edward Stanley (1899–1977), who inherited the title and also took on managing Eagle Star.

The family Motto is Cum cruce salus.

== Heraldic achievement ==
Coat of arms of Edward Mountain
Crest Issuant from the battlements of a tower Proper a demi lion guardant Argent holding between the paws an escallop Gules. Escutcheon Ermine on a fess Azure between three lions rampant guardant Sable each holding between the forepaws an escallop Gules three cross crosslets Argent. Motto Cum cruce salus. Badge An ivy leaf and a maple leaf slipped in saltire Proper enfiled by a circlet Or.

Baronetage of the United Kingdom
New creation	Baronet (of Oare Manor and Brendon); 1922–1948	Succeeded by Brian Mountain
