= Voice (trade union) =

- Merged into: Community
- Founded: 1970
- Dissolved: 1 October 2020
- Headquarters: 2 St James' Court; Friar Gate; Derby; DE1 1BT
- Location: United Kingdom
- Members: 19,711 (2020)
- Key people: Ray Bryant (Founder); Deborah Lawson (General Secretary)
- Affiliations: GFTU
- Website: www.voicetheunion.org.uk

Voice, formerly the Professional Association of Teachers (PAT), was a British trade union representing teachers, lecturers and other education and childcare workers in British education. The union is committed to protecting and promoting the "cause of education" and to defending the professional interests of members.

In 2020, Voice became the education and early years section of the British trade union Community and retains responsibility for the union's education policy and maintains a specialist staff. As a section of Community, it now respects and reserves its right to take industrial action in accordance with wishes of its members and policy of Community.

Voice was an independent trade union until October 2020. Whilst "respecting and reserving" its legal right to take industrial action, Voice previously maintained a policy that it did not engage in "any kind of industrial action" that is "injurious to education" or damaging to the health, safety of welfare of those in its care or charge.

== History ==
The Professional Association of Teachers was founded in 1970 by two Essex teachers: Colin Leicester and Ray Bryant. The union initially aimed to recruit teachers from all colleges, schools and universities, and by 1979 had a membership of 13,000. In 1981, the Conservative government gave the union a seat on the Burnham Committee, and its membership increased rapidly, reaching 40,000 by 1985. By 2001, it still had 34,000 members, many from early years education, and whilst The Guardian has claimed that it struggled to recruit and that rival unions believed it was likely to close, this did not occur and the union remains active.

In February 2008, the Professional Association of Teachers became Voice: the union for education professionals.

In 2018, Voice affiliated to the General Federation of Trade Unions, the 'federation for specialist unions', and works constructively with other unions in pursuit of shared objectives to the benefit of Voice members.

From October 2020 Voice: The Union for Education Professionals has transferred to general trade union Community to become its education and early years section.

== Affiliated bodies ==
The Professional Association of Nursery Nurses (PANN) was established, in 1982, by a group of nursery nurses, who also wished to commit themselves to the principle of not striking. They became a section of PAT on 1 September 1995.

The Professionals Allied to Teaching (PAtT) section was launched in 2000. The National Association of Administrative Staff in Schools and Colleges, which had been founded in 1951 as the School Secretaries Association, merged into PAT/PAtT in 2001. The PANN and PAtT sections no longer exist, as they are now part of Voice.

The charity PAT (Education and Learning) was launched by the Professional Association of Teachers in 1999. This charity changed its name, in June 2008, to Voice (Supporting Education and Learning.

== General Secretaries ==
1980: Peter Dawson
1992: John Andrews
1998: Kay Driver
2001: Jean Gemmell
2006: Philip Parkin
2012: Deborah Lawson
