= British Union of Social Work Employees =

The British Union of Social Work Employees (BUSWE) was a trade union representing social workers in the United Kingdom.

In 1976, a group of (mostly) local authority social workers met in Sheffield and formed a new trade union called the National Union of Social Workers (NUSW) which was essentially a breakaway from the major public sector white collar union, NALGO. Two years later BASW, a professional association, decided to form an associated trade union, the British Union of Social Work. However, neither NUSW or BUSW were recognised by any significant employers and they were opposed by existing trade unions who continued to represent the great majority of social workers employed in the public sector (and who were mainly in NALGO). BASW decided to withdraw its support for BUSW but the union's leadership decided to continue, relocating to Manchester and merging with NUSW in 1981 to form the British Union of Social Work Employees.

BUSWE survived and attempted to affiliate to the Trades Union Congress, but it was still regarded as a 'breakaway union' by other TUC affiliates, especially NALGO and its successor, Unison, and thus was unsuccessful. By 2007, it had 1,640 members and in 2008 it merged into the TUC affiliated Community.

== General Secretaries ==
1981: Vic Waite
1985: Stan Crawshaw
2000s: Harry Lyons
