= Old Age Pensions Act 1936 =

Act of the Parliament of the United Kingdom

Old Age Pensions Act 1936 (Note: Section 16(3).)
- Act of Parliament
- Parliament of the United Kingdom
- Long title: An Act to consolidate the enactments relating to non-contributory Old Age Pensions.
- Citation: 26 Geo. 5 & 1 Edw. 8. c. 31
- Territorial extent: England and Wales; Scotland; (Note: Section 16(2).)

Dates
- Royal assent: 14 July 1936
- Commencement: 1 January 1937 (Note: Section 16(1).)
- Repealed: England and Wales: 2 December 1966 (Note: The Ministry of Social Security Act 1966 (Commencement) Order 1966 SI 1966/986).); Northern Ireland:
Other legislation
Amends	See § Repealed enactments
Repeals/revokes	See § Repealed enactments
Amended by	Pensions and Determination of Needs Act 1943; National Insurance (No.2) Act 1957
Repealed by	England and Wales and Scotland: Ministry of Social Security Act 1966; Northern Ireland: Social Security (Miscellaneous Provisions) (Northern Ireland) Order 1977
Relates to	National Health Insurance Act 1936; Widows', Orphans' and Old Age Contributory Pensions Act 1936; Old Age Pensions Act (Northern Ireland) 1936

Status: Repealed

Text of statute as originally enacted

The Old Age Pensions Act 1936 (26 Geo. 5 & 1 Edw. 8. c. 31) was an act of the Parliament of the United Kingdom that consolidated enactments relating to non-contributory old age pensions in Great Britain.

== Provisions ==
=== Repealed enactments ===
Section 14 of the act repealed 7 enactments, listed in the second schedule to the act.

Citation	Short title	Extent of repeal
8 Edw. 7. c. 40	Old-Age Pensions Act 1908	The whole act.
1 & 2 Geo. 5. c. 16	Old Age Pensions Act 1911	The whole act.
9 & 10 Geo. 5. c. 102	Old Age Pensions Act 1919	The whole act.
10 & 11 Geo. 5. c. 49	Blind Persons Act 1920	Section one.
SR&O 1922/467	Government of Ireland (Modification of Old Age Pensions Acts) Order 1922	The whole Order.
SR&O 1923/405	Irish Free State (Consequential Adaptation of Enactments) Order 1923	Article nine.
14 & 15 Geo. 5. c. 33	Old Age Pensions Act 1924	The whole act.

== Subsequent developments ==
The whole act was repealed for England and Wales and Scotland by the Ministry of Social Security Act 1966, which came into force on 2 December 1966.
