= Eagle Star Insurance =

British insurance company

Eagle Star
- Industry: Insurance
- Founded: 1904
- Defunct: 1999
- Fate: Acquired
- Successor: Zurich Financial Services
- Headquarters: Cheltenham, Gloucestershire, England, United Kingdom
- Key people: Sir Denis Mountain, (Chairman)

The Eagle Star Insurance Company plc (formerly Eagle Star Insurance Company Limited) was a leading British insurance business. It underwrote the full range of risks including liability, fire, accident, marine, motor, life, contingency and Pluvius (weather) insurance. It was listed on the London Stock Exchange and was a constituent of the FTSE 100 Index.

== History ==
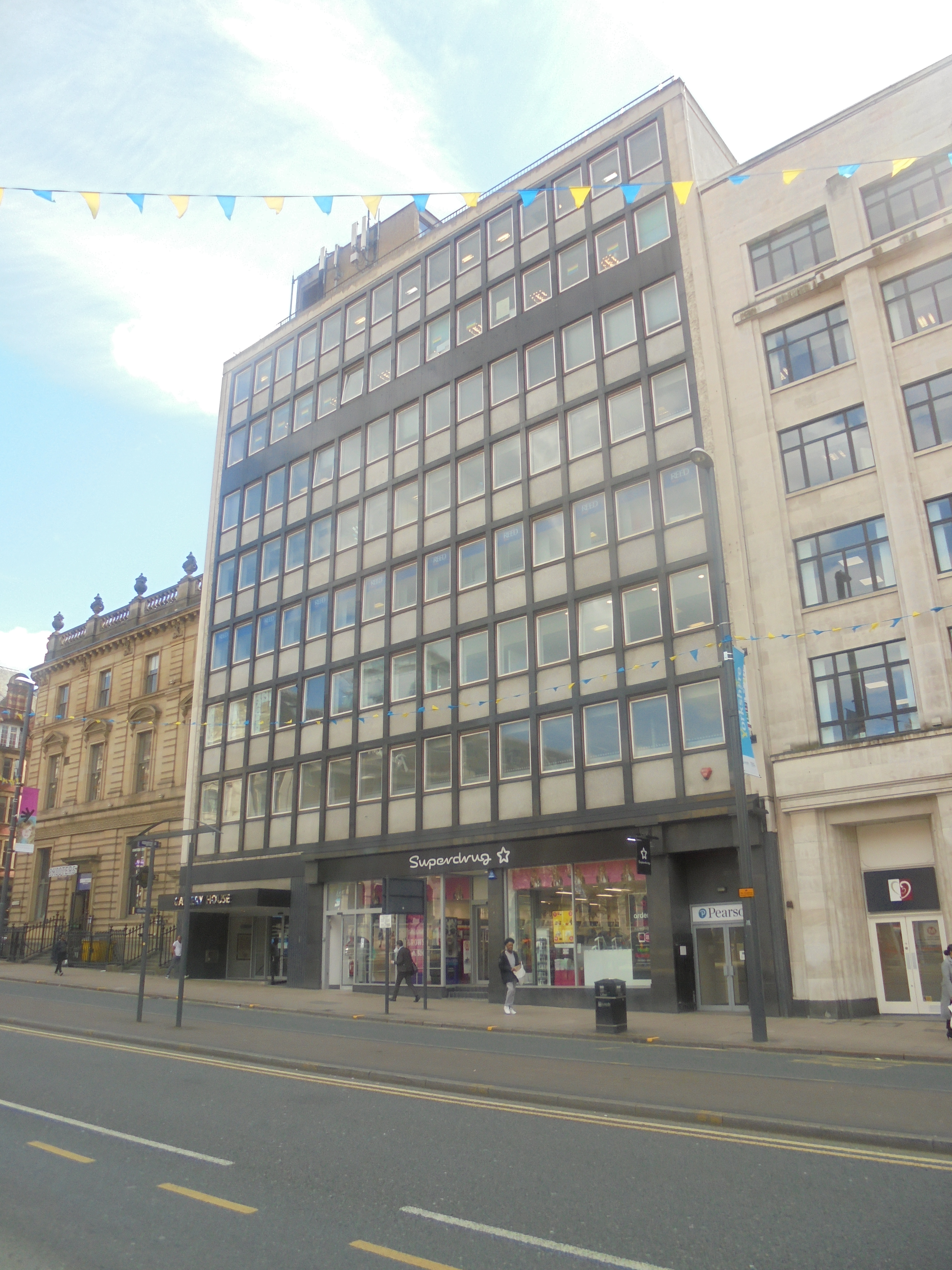
Former Eagle Star building on The Headrow in Leeds.

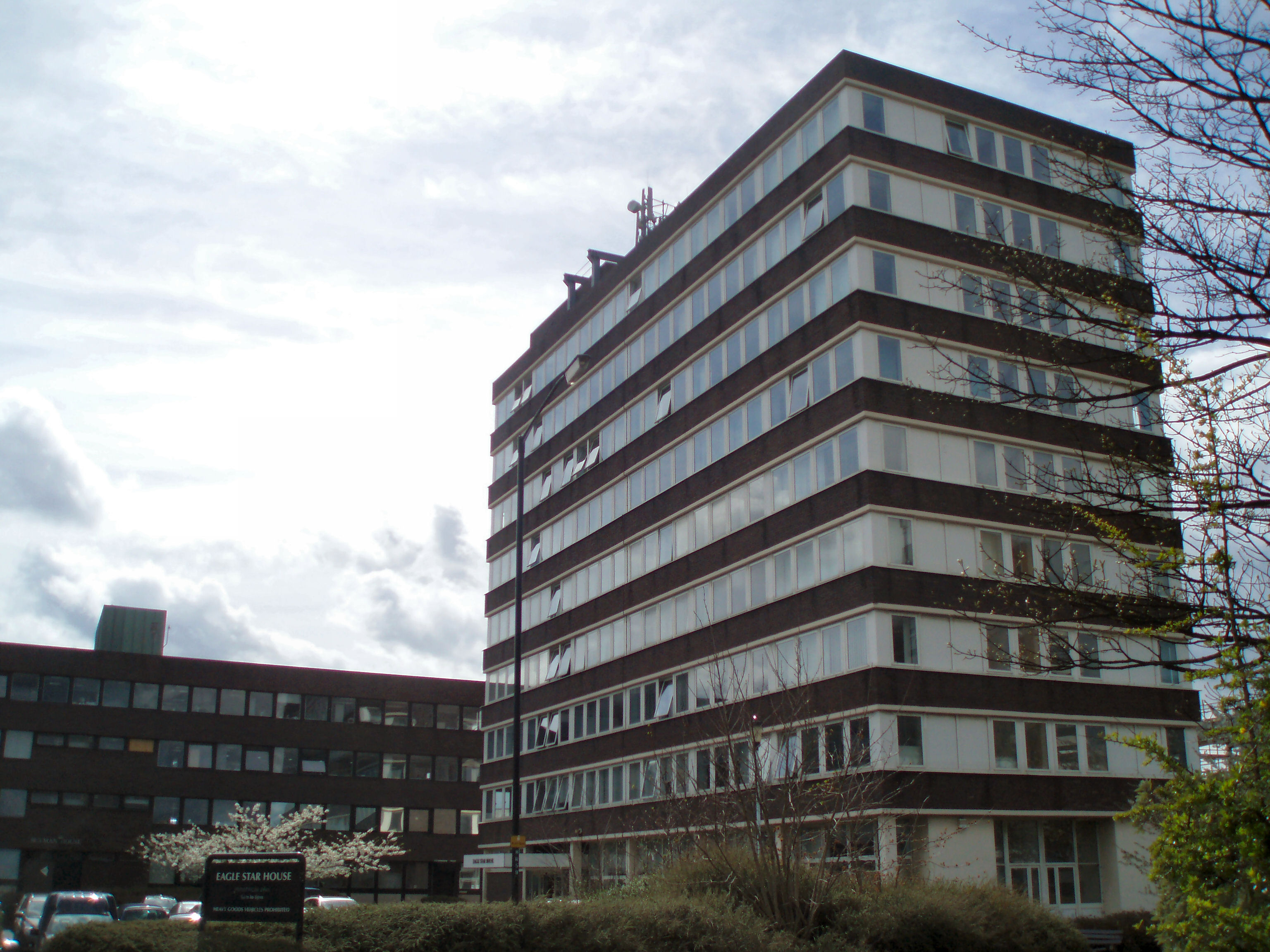
Former Eagle Star Insurance building at the Regent Centre, Gosforth, Newcastle upon Tyne.

The Eagle Insurance Company was founded by Sir William Rawlins in 1807. In 1858 it acquired Albion Life Insurance Company, which had been founded in 1805.

The British Dominions Marine Insurance Company was founded by Edward Mountain in 1904, which operated as a marine insurance office in the five principal overseas dominions.

It started writing fire and accident policies in 1911 and life assurance policies in 1916.

It expanded rapidly in its early years acquiring the Eagle Insurance Company in 1916 and both the Sceptre Insurance Company (founded in 1864) and Star Assurance Society (founded in 1843, Star Life Assurance Society until 1911) in 1917. It was renamed the Eagle Star and British Dominions in 1917 and Eagle Star in 1937.

For many years its head office was at the prestigious address 1 Threadneedle Street, London EC2. However, a new administrative head office and computer centre was opened in Cheltenham in October 1968.

In 1981 it fought off a takeover bid from Allianz, the German insurance Group.

It was acquired by BAT Industries for £968m in 1984. It continued to trade, under the Eagle Star name, until acquisition by Zurich Financial Services in 1999.

In the 1980s, the company supported the Nature Conservatory and the Royal Society for the Protection of Birds in the successful reintroduction of sea eagles to Scotland.

== See also ==
- Eagle Star Staff Union
- Syed, Isabel, Eagle Star A guide to its history and archives, 1997
- Splater, E.G., Box 1299, n/d 1950?
