= William Goodreds =

English cricketer

Cricket information
- Batting: Right-handed

Career statistics
Competition	First-class
Matches	1
Runs scored	4
Batting average	–
100s/50s	0/0
Top score	4*
Balls bowled	72
Wickets	0
Bowling average	–
5 wickets in innings	–
10 wickets in match	–
Best bowling	–
Catches/stumpings	0/–
- Source: Cricinfo, 7 November 2022

William Arthur Goodreds (3 November 1920 – 9 February 2014) was an English first-class cricketer born in Pensnett, Staffordshire who played in a single first-class match for Worcestershire against Cambridge University in 1952. He opened the bowling in both innings, but sent down only twelve overs in the game without taking a wicket; with the bat he scored 4 not out in his only innings.
