= Daniel Everett (RAF officer) =

Royal Air Force officer

- Born: Daniel Trevor Bulmer Everett; 15 October 1920; Epsom, Surrey
- Died: 7 March 1945 (aged 24); Hemmingstedt, Germany
- Burial place: Hamburg War Cemetery, Germany
- Military career
- Allegiance: United Kingdom
- Branch: Royal Air Force
- Service years: 1941–45
- Rank: Squadron Leader
- Nickname: Danny
- Service number: 155223
- Units: No. 158 Squadron RAF; No. 35 Squadron RAF
- Conflicts: Second World War
- Awards: Distinguished Flying Cross and 2 Bars.

Squadron Leader Daniel Trevor Bulmer "Danny" Everett, DFC and 2 Bars (15 October 1920 – 7 March 1945), was a leading Royal Air Force Bomber Command and Pathfinder Force pilot and bombing leader, decorated three times for gallantry before being killed in action.

== Early life ==
Everett was the son of Ellen Ada and Harold Bulmer Everett, a chartered accountant of Epsom, Surrey. He was the youngest of 9 children (6 girls and 3 boys). They lived at 30 Woodcote Park Road in Epsom, Surrey.

He was educated at Kingswood House Preparatory School in Epsom and later the City of London Freemen's School in Ashtead Park, Surrey. He was considered an accomplished all-round sportsman.

Prior to joining the RAF he worked in London for his uncle Tom McNabb.

== Royal Air Force service ==
Everett enlisted in the Royal Air Force Volunteer Reserve around May 1940, probably at RAF Uxbridge and was allocated service number 1263497.

=== Bomber Command ===
He trained to fly with the rank of Sergeant and in July 1942 he was stationed at RAF Bicester, flying as a pilot with No. 13 Operational Training Unit of RAF Bomber Command, which trained light day bomber aircrew in Bristol Blenheims.

His next posting was to No. 1652 Heavy Conversion Unit, at RAF Marston Moor.

Having been posted to No. 158 Squadron RAF at RAF Lissett on 28 February 1943 to fly Handley Page Halifax bombers he flew several operations as second pilot in March and April 1943. On 4 September 1943 he was detached to No. 1502 Beam Approach Training Flight at RAF Driffield, where he operationally tested recently developed equipment designed to improve the bombing accuracy of new crews in his next six operations through April and May 1943. Everett was commissioned pilot officer on 29 May 1943 and issued service number 155223.

=== Pathfinder Force ===
He then joined No. 35 Squadron RAF, of Bomber Command's Pathfinder Force, at RAF Graveley. Serving with No. 35 Squadron, Everett was recommended for a medal, and then promoted to flying officer on 29 November 1943.

Everett was awarded the Distinguished Flying Cross announced in the London Gazette on 21 January 1944. No citation was published but the original recommendation dated 29 October 1943 read: –

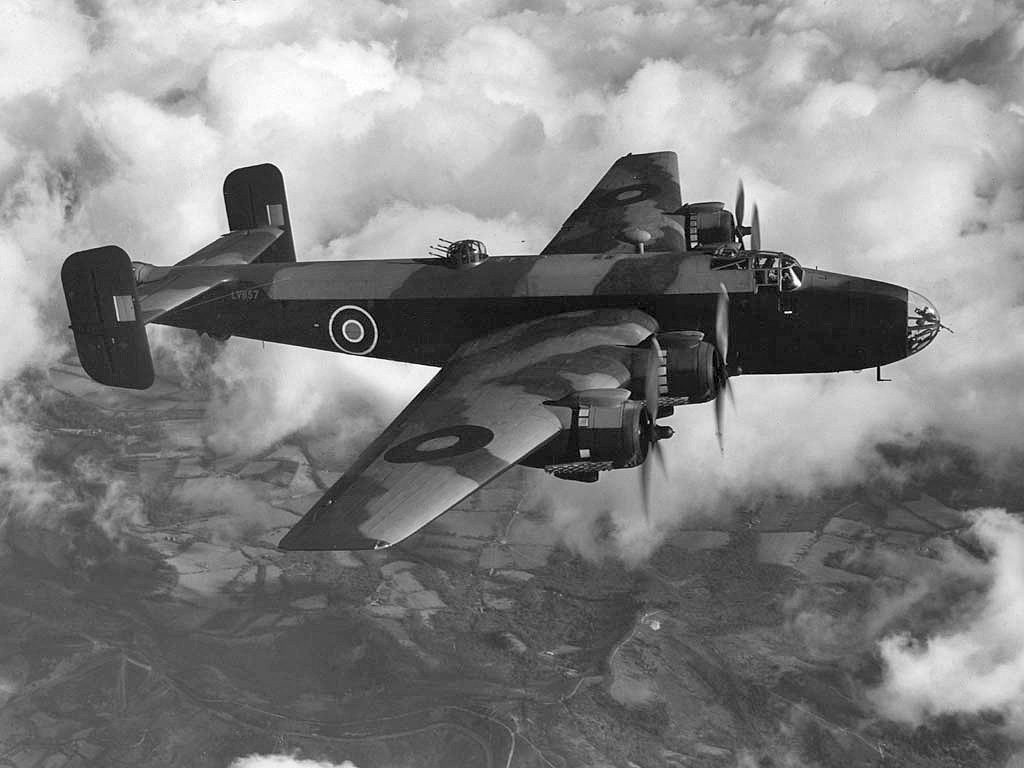
Handley Page Halifax bomber

Pilot Officer Everett was captain of an aircraft detailed to attack Kassel on the night of 22/23 October 1943. En route to the target the weather was particularly bad and some of his blind flying instruments became inoperative owing to the icing conditions. This officer carried on despite this handicap as he fully realised the importance of this special task and at the target he made a most successful attack, this being proved by an excellent photograph. Throughout the 33 night bombing attacks in which he has taken part, Pilot Officer Everett has consistently maintained an extremely high standard of tenacity and reliability and it is considered that the fine results he achieved in this attack fully merits the immediate (amended to non-immediate by the AOC) award of the Distinguished Flying Cross.

On completion of his Pathfinder Force tour of 45 operations Everett was posted from No. 35 Squadron RAF to the Pathfinder Force Navigational Training Unit for some months "rest".

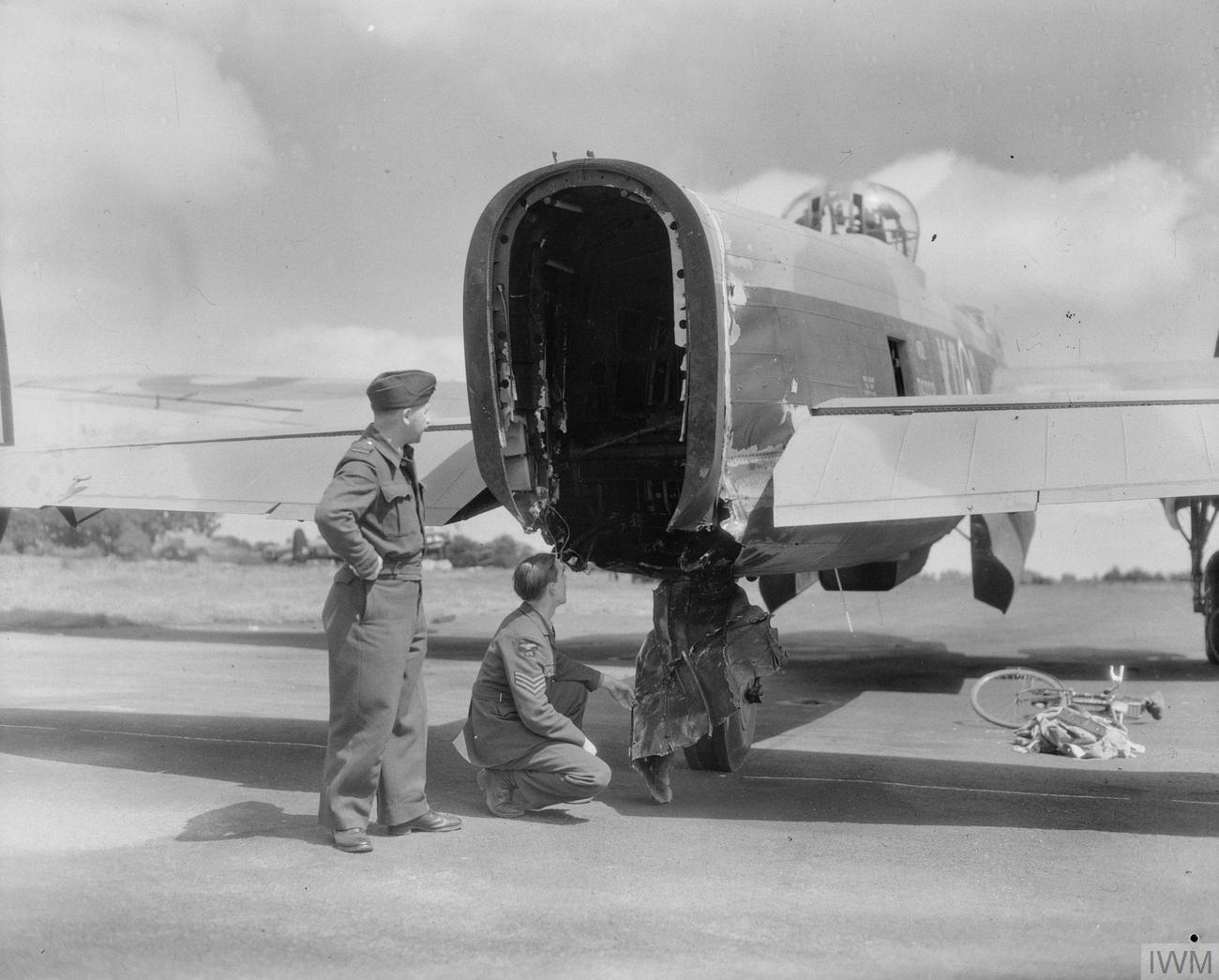
Lancaster which returned without its rear turret.

He requested a return to operational flying and rejoined No. 35 Squadron RAF on 22 August 1944.

Everett was awarded a Bar to the Distinguished Flying Cross as an acting flight lieutenant.

The citation of his award reads: "This officer, now on his second operational tour, is a brilliant captain of aircraft, possessing the greatest determination on operations and the utmost thoroughness in all matters of airmanship. Since being awarded the DFC he has taken part in many attacks against the enemy on widely separated targets such as Berlin, Nuremberg, the Ruhr and Army support attacks in Normandy. Whatever the target and whatever the task, he can be depended upon to mark and bomb with the greatest reliability. Flight Lieutenant Everett continues to show the keenest desire to operate against the enemy on all possible occasions and his enthusiasm and efficiency sets an example to the entire Squadron. In recognition of this Officer's fine record of service, he is recommended for the non-immediate award of a Bar to the Distinguished Flying Cross."

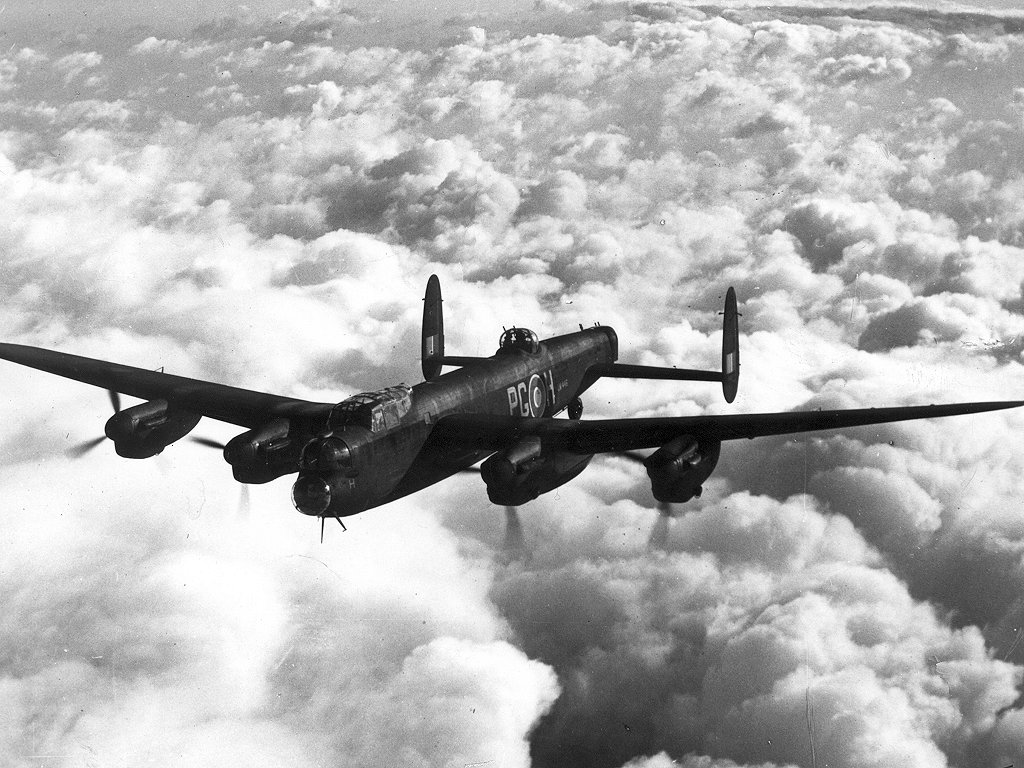
Avro Lancaster bomber

On 14 January 1945 he had piloted an Avro Lancaster serial number "PB684", squadron codes TL-B from RAF Graveley to Merseburg – Leuna. Over the target area his aircraft was hit by a bomb dropped by a friendly aircraft, the rear turret was smashed and later broke away taking with it the body of the rear gunner, flying officer Raymond Salvoni, DFC, who was believed to have been killed by the impact of the bomb. Everett brought the aircraft home safely.

On 18 February 1945 Everett was recommended for the award of a Distinguished Service Order, which was later changed to a second Bar to the Distinguished Flying Cross. His award was published in the London Gazette for 23 March 1945:

One night in February 1945, Squadron Leader Everett was pilot and captain of an aircraft detailed to attack Goch. Whilst making his first run over the target his aircraft was badly hit. The starboard main plane was extensively damaged and the starboard inner engine caught fire. Momentarily the aircraft went out of control. Squadron Leader Everett quickly levelled out though and feathered the propeller of the burning engine. The flames were then extinguished. Although unable to assess the full extent of the damage sustained, Squadron Leader Everett went on to make several further bombing runs over the target, which he only left after he was satisfied as to the success of the operation. He afterwards flew the badly damaged aircraft safely to base. This officer displayed a high degree of skill, courage and resolution throughout.

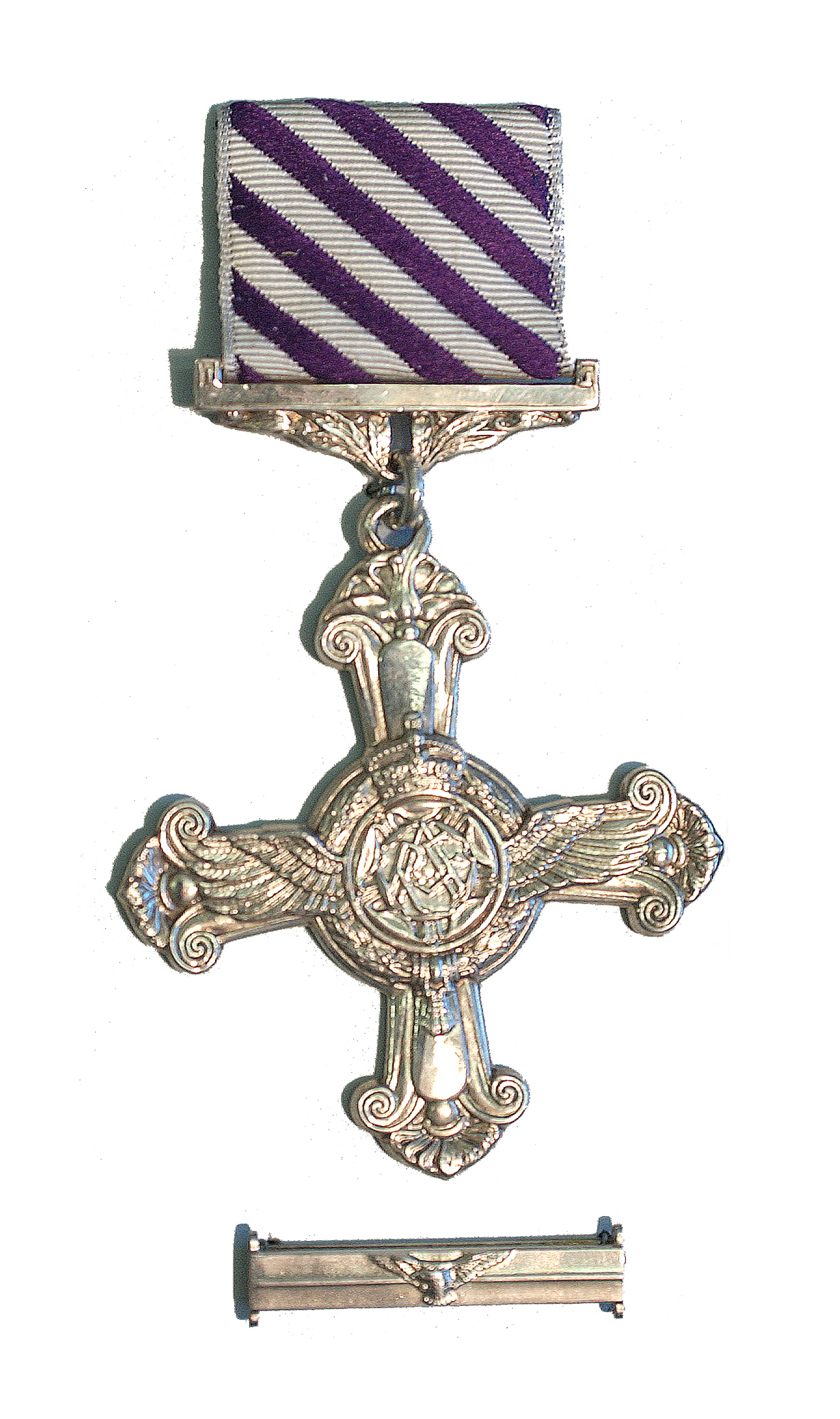
Distinguished Flying Cross with a Bar

Everett was promoted to full flight lieutenant and appointed acting squadron leader on 25 February 1945. The total number of operations he flew was astounding: he is recorded with various totals from 99 to 120.

=== Killed in action ===
Everett was ordered to take a rest from operations but continued to look for opportunities to fly, and on 7 March 1945 gathered a "scratch crew" of senior airmen for a spare Avro Lancaster aircraft, serial number "ME361", to lead 256 Halifaxes and 25 Lancasters of Nos. 4, 6 and 8 Groups to attack the Deutsche Erdöl-Aktiengesellschaft oil refinery at Hemmingstedt, near Heide. Everett took off at 18:53 hours from RAF Graveley as Master Bomber. His aircraft was shot down at about 22:00 hours in the target area, apparently hit by flak. The claim for a Lancaster shot down was submitted by Luftwaffe 3rd Flak Division. Everett and his crew of eight were killed; they were buried by the Germans at Hemmingstedt but later moved to the Commonwealth War Graves Commission war cemetery at Hamburg.

== Honours and awards ==

1) Distinguished Flying Cross on 21 January 1944.

2) Bar to the Distinguished Flying Cross on 16 January 1945.

3) Second Bar to the Distinguished Flying Cross on 27 March 1945.

== See also ==
- RAF Bomber Command Aircrew of World War II

== Bibliography ==
- Chorley, William R. (1998). RAF Bomber Command Losses. Vol. 6. Midland Counties. ISBN 0-904597-92-X.
- Mason, Francis K. (1989). The Avro Lancaster. Air Britain. ISBN 978-0946627301.
- Bowyer, Chaz (1979). Path Finders at War. Ian Allan. ISBN 0711007578.
- Musgrove, Gordon (1992). Pathfinder Force: A History of 8 Group. Crecy. ISBN 978-0-947554-23-1.
- Bowyer, Chaz (2001). Bomber Barons. Pen & Sword. ISBN 085052802X.
