= Michael Crawford (cricketer) =

English cricketer and administrator

Michael Grove Crawford (30 July 1920 – 2 December 2012) was an English first-class cricketer, who played one match for Yorkshire County Cricket Club in 1951.

A right-handed batsman, he scored 13 and 9 and took a catch, against Worcestershire at North Marine Road Ground, Scarborough, a match won by the visitors by eight runs. He also played for the Yorkshire Second XI from 1947 to 1953, and for Craven Gentlemen against Ireland in 1947.

He led Yorkshire Second XI in 1951 and 1952, and was captain of Leeds C.C. for fifteen seasons up to 1962, lending them to their first Yorkshire League title in 1958, and their third Yorkshire Council championship in the same year.

He became treasurer of Yorkshire in 1960, also serving as chairman. In 1991, he was a member of the board of the Leeds Cricket, Football and Athletic Club.

His son, Neil Crawford, played twenty two matches for Cambridge University from 1978 to 1980.

He died on 2 December 2012 at the age of 92
