= United Family Services =

- Company type: Private, Non-Profit
- Founded: 1909
- Headquarters: Charlotte, North Carolina
- Website: www.unitedfamilyservices.org

United Family Service (UFS) is a not-for-profit, family service organization based in Charlotte, North Carolina, with offices in Concord, Huntersville, Monroe and Mooresville, NC. United Family Services is a member of United Way of Central Carolinas, Inc. and is accredited by the Council on Accreditation.

== History ==
United Family Services was founded in 1882 by 100 religious and business leaders who pledged $25 a year each to support the work of the organization. With offices in Cabarrus, Mecklenburg, Mooresville/S. Iredell and Union counties, United Family Services has 84 full-time employees and more than 250 active volunteers.
