= William Ralph Turner =

English painter

William Ralph Turner (30 April 1920 – 10 July 2013) was a painter from Manchester.

== Life and work ==
William Ralph Turner was born in Chorlton-on-Medlock, Manchester, in 1920. A largely self-taught painter and teacher, he has become known as one of the last authentic Northern English industrial artists. Lowry was to visit Turner's exhibitions at the Tib Lane Gallery in the 1950s and 1960s, and the influence of L.S. Lowry can be seen in Turner's work.

For about 60 years Turner painted the North West and surrounding areas, often from memories and images obtained while indulging his passion for cycling long distances. A prolific painter, he painted thousands of pictures, including several hundred that featured the Stockport Viaduct. He was commissioned by Peter Burdett (of The Pitcairn Gallery) in the 1970s to paint Lyon in France and was represented by The Pitcairn until 1985 when the then owner, Wendy Levy, sold the gallery. In the 1980s he had exhibitions in Windsor and Eton and self organised shows in and around the Cheshire area including at Adlington Hall and in 1989 he was featured in a major book about northern artists by the artist and critic Peter Davies. Turner was "re-discovered" by David Gunning, an art dealer from Todmorden, in 2000, when Turner was 80.

Parkinson's disease eventually forced Turner to stop painting. In 2005, he was given a retrospective at Gallery Oldham with an accompanying book. An exhibition of Turner's work took place at Clark Art in Hale, Cheshire, in 2010. A major book on his life and work was launched at this exhibition.
