= Bill Towers (footballer) =

English footballer

Personal information
- Full name: William Harry Towers
- Date of birth: 13 July 1920
- Place of birth: Leicester, England
- Date of death: 2000 (aged 79–80)
- Position: Midfielder

Senior career*
Years	Team	Apps	(Gls)
1946–1947	Leicester City	4	(0)
1947–1956	Torquay United	274	(0)
- * Club domestic league appearances and goals

William Harry Towers (13 July 1920 – April 2000) was an English professional footballer. He was born in Leicester.

Towers signed for Leicester City from local side Bentley Eng. in January 1945, making 4 league appearances in the first post-war Football League season. He was signed by Jack Butler for Torquay United in October 1946 and went on to make 292 first team games (274 in the league), all of which came at either wing-half or right-back. Before retiring in 1955, Towers played under 5 managers at Plainmoor and played in the Gulls' 1954–55 run in the FA Cup in which the Gulls beat Leeds United before losing 1–0 at home to Huddersfield Town in front of the biggest crowd ever seen at Plainmoor.

After retiring as a player, Towers moved into adult education and eventually taught inmates at Parkhurst Prison on the Isle of Wight.

Towers died in April 2000 at the age of 79.
