= Community (trade union) =

UK trade union

- Community
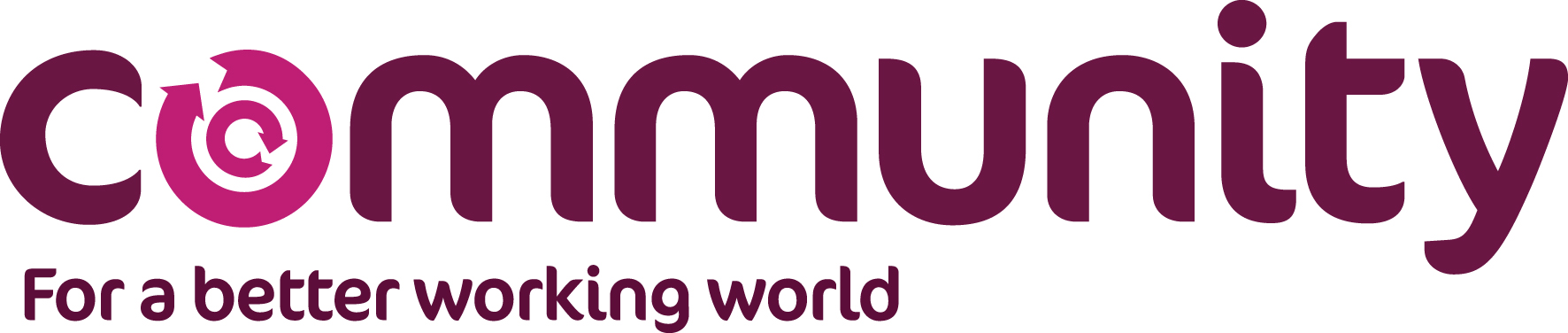
- Founded: 2004; 22 years ago
- Headquarters: 465c Caledonian Road, London
- Location: United Kingdom
- Members: ▼43,595 (2024)
- General Secretary: Alasdair McDiarmid
- Affiliations: TUC; STUC; CSEU; Labour Party
- Website: community-tu.org

Community is a British trade union which formed in 2004. The union represents workers in a diverse range of sectors, including iron and steel, justice and custodial, domestic appliance manufacturing, textiles and footwear, road transport, betting, the third sector, education and early years as well as the self-employed.

Although the former trade unions which amalgamated to form Community were all craft unions or industrial unions, Community is now a general union (and the smallest of the 'General Unions' in the TUC). Community has merged or transferred engagements with a number of unions, some of which have become sections within Community. These include the National League of the Blind and Disabled (NLBD), the National Union of Domestic Appliance and General Operatives (NUDAGO), the National Union of Knitwear, Footwear & Apparel Trades (KFAT), the British Union of Social Work Employees (BUSWE), the Prison Service Union (representing staff in the UK's privatised prisons and wider justice sector), the UFS, Blue Chip Staff Association (BCSA) and the Independent Democratic Union (IDU).

Community actively participates in the Trades Union Congress and Community's then General Secretary Michael Leahy served as TUC President in 2010/2011.

When Community was formed from the merger of KFAT and the ISTC in 2004 it was arranged for the first new member of the newly constituted union to be the then UK Chancellor of the Exchequer (and future Prime Minister), Gordon Brown.

== History ==
Community was formed from a merger of the Iron and Steel Trades Confederation (ISTC) and the National Union of Knitwear, Footwear & Apparel Trades (KFAT), effective from 1 July 2004. From this point the new trade union began advocating 'Community Unionism' which dictates that the union directs effort not only towards improving conditions in the workplace but also in the general community in which members live.

=== Iron and Steel Trades Confederation (ISTC) ===
The Iron and Steel Trades Confederation (ISTC) was constituted on 1 January 1917 from a merger of the British Steel Smelters, Mill, Iron and Tinplate Workers Union, The Associated Iron and Steel Workers of Great Britain and the National Steel Workers' Association Engineering and Labour League.

The ISTC was later joined by the Amalgamated Association of Steel & Iron Workers of Great Britain in 1920 and the Tin and Sheet Millmens Association in 1921. The Wire Workers Union joined in 1922, but withdrew in 1924. The Wire Workers Union rejoined in 1991. In 1985 the National Union of Blastfurnacemen joined the ISTC.

However the decline of British manufacturing jobs in these industries led the union to diversify its membership merging with the National League of the Blind and Disabled (NLBD) in 1999 and the Power Loom Carpet Weavers and Textile Workers Union (PLCWTWU) in 2000.

=== National Union of Knitwear, Footwear and Apparel Trades (KFAT) ===
The National Union of Knitwear, Footwear & Apparel Trades (KFAT) was formed in 1991 by the merger of the National Union of Hosiery and Knitwear Workers (NUHKW) with National Union of Footwear, Leather and Allied Trades (NUFLAT).

NUFLAT had been formed in 1873 following a meeting of various regional associations. The history of the NUHKW can be traced back to 1776 and the formation of the Stocking Makers Association in Nottingham.

=== National League of the Blind and the Disabled (NLBD) ===
The NLBD claims that it is the oldest organisation of disabled people in the world. It was formed as a trade union in 1899.

The NLBD campaigned for disabled people from formation and in 1920 lobbied parliament successfully to introduce the world's first piece of blind person specific legislation, the Blind Persons Act 1920. This tradition of advocacy contributed to the creation of the Disability Rights Commission and the Disability Discrimination Act 2005.

=== Subsequent mergers ===
In 2008 the membership of the British Union of Social Work Employees voted in favour of a transfer of engagements to Community. Their merger with Community in 2008 brought BUSWE members back into a TUC affiliated union. In a strange case of history repeating itself, BASW decided in 2011 to set up yet another trade union arm (this time called the "Social Workers' Union") but this body has no connection whatsoever with BUSWE branches within Community.

The Staff Union West Bromwich Building Society, with around 500 members, merged into Community in February 2018.

Blue chip staff association transferred to Community in 2019 followed by the Independent Democratic Union in 2020.

From October 2020, Voice: The Union for Education Professionals became a part of Community, becoming its education and early years section.

== Affiliations ==
Community is affiliated to a number of national, European and International union structures.

At a national level, Community is affiliated to the Trades Union Congress (TUC), Scottish Trades Union Congress (STUC) and Wales TUC.

At a European level, Community affiliates to the European Trade Union Confederation (ETUC), European Metalworkers' Federation (EMF), European Trade Union Federation - Textiles, Clothing & Leather (ETUF-TCL) and UNI-Europa.

At an international level, Community affiliates to the International Trade Union Confederation (ITUC), International Metalworkers' Federation (IMF), International Textile, Garment and Leather Workers' Federation (ITGLWF) and UNI-Global.

Community is affiliated to the Labour Party and the Co-operative Party.

== Structure ==
Community is organised into 8 regions and has several industrial sections. The regions are:

- Scotland and Northern Ireland,
- North East England,
- Yorkshire and Humberside,
- North West England and North Wales,
- West Midlands
- South Wales and South West England
- East Midlands
- London and South East England

The Sections are:

- Steel and Wire
- Betting shop workers
- Justice
- Third sector
- Self-employed
- Textile, Garment, Knitwear, Footwear and Leather Workers
- National League of the Blind and Disabled.

Community is governed by the national executive council NEC of 21 members and the general secretary. This body is elected for three-year terms with each region being allocated NEC seats proportionally. There are also three seats reserved for women members, one for members with disabilities and one for ethnic minority members.

Each year the NEC elects one member to serve one year as vice-president and then a further year as president.

The day-to-day business of the union is conducted by the general secretary and the staff of the head office in London and by the Member Service Centre based in Kidderminster. In addition to this there are regional officers based at several locations around the UK.

== Officeholders ==
Community held its first elections for national officeholders in October–November 2008.

=== General Secretary ===
General Secretaries are elected for five year terms by the ordinary members of the union.

2004: Michael J. Leahy
2013: Roy Rickhuss
2026: Alasdair McDiarmid

=== Deputy General Secretary ===
2004: Paul Gates
2008: Joe Mann
2013: Post abolished

=== Assistant General Secretaries ===
2004: Roy Rickhuss and Barry Morris
2013: John Park
2013: John Paul McHugh
2023—2026: Alasdair McDiarmid

=== President and vice president ===
The vice president is elected biennially by the NEC. After two years in this position the vice president then serves for two years as president of the union.
