= David Lacy-Scott =

English cricketer (1920–2020)

Personal information
- Full name: David Geffrey Lacy-Scott
- Born: 18 August 1920; Calcutta, British India
- Died: 2 February 2020 (aged 99); Eye, Suffolk, England
- Batting: Right-handed
- Bowling: Right-arm fast-medium

Domestic team information
- Years: Team
- 1946–1948: Cambridge University
- 1946: Kent

Career statistics
Competition	First-class
Matches	11
Runs scored	294
Batting average	14.00
100s/50s	0/0
Top score	36
Balls bowled	600
Wickets	9
Bowling average	29.77
5 wickets in innings	1
10 wickets in match	0
Best bowling	5/35
Catches/stumpings	0/–
- Source: Cricinfo, 14 December 2018

David Geffrey Lacy-Scott (18 August 1920 – 2 February 2020) was an English amateur cricketer.

Born at Calcutta in August 1920, Lacy-Scott was educated at Marlborough College and Peterhouse, Cambridge. He served in the British Indian Army during the Second World War, receiving an emergency commission in to the Royal Indian Army Service Corps on 27 October 1941. He relinquished his commission on account of ill-health, 22 December 1945, and was granted the honorary rank of captain.

Lacy-Scott made ten first-class cricket appearances for Cambridge University Cricket Club as an opening batsman, almost all of which came in the 1946 English cricket season. He won a Blue in 1946 but only played one first-class match for Cambridge after the season, appearing in 1948 against Free Foresters. He also made one appearance for Kent against Sussex in August 1946, having previously played in two Minor Counties Championship matches for Kent's Second XI in 1938 and 1939.

He latterly resided in rural Suffolk and died in February 2020 at the age of 99.
