= National League of the Blind and Disabled =

Former trade union of the United Kingdom

NLBD
- National League of the Blind and Disabled
- Merged into: Community
- Founded: 1899
- Headquarters: 465c Caledonian Road, London N7 9GX
- Location: United Kingdom
- Members: 3,500 (1982)
- Key people: Joe Mann (Secretary)
- Publication: The Advocate
- Affiliations: TUC, Labour

The National League of the Blind and Disabled (NLBD) is a section within the Community trade union. It was a trade union in its own right in the United Kingdom throughout the twentieth century (1899–2000), and is said to be the oldest surviving disabled persons' organisation in the world.

== History ==
Originally called the National League of the Blind, the NLB was founded in 1893, and registered as a trade union in 1899. It affiliated to the Trades Union Congress in 1902. It was initially led by Ben Purse, a piano tuner, born in Salford in 1874. During the early 1900s its General Secretary was Thomas Summerbell.

The League organised its first strike in 1912. In April 1920 it organised a march that converged towards Trafalgar Square from Leeds, Manchester and Newport in support of what became the Blind Persons Act 1920. This action inspired the later Jarrow March. Purse left the union in 1921, forming the National Union of the Professional and Industrial Blind, which later became the National Association of Blind Workers in 1933, and focused on providing benefits to its members. The National League of the Blind organised a further march in 1936, which met with less success, although it did achieve a further Blind Persons Act in 1938.

The NLB campaigned strongly for and organised its membership within state-provided sheltered employment workshops for blind workers, and it resisted any charity-based alternatives in welfare or employment for blind people.

In later years this tradition of advocacy contributed, with other organisations of disabled people, to some advances in disabled people's welfare, including the introduction of disability benefits and the creation of the Disability Rights Commission and the Disability Discrimination Act 1995.

The union voted to rename itself the "National League of the Blind and Disabled" in 1968, and by 1979 had a membership of reportedly just under 5000.

A book giving a detailed history of the League was published in 2015 - Blind Workers Against Charity, by Matthias Reiss.

== Recent times ==
In 1981 the NLBD was one of the founding organisations which created the radical British Council of Organisations of Disabled People. The NLBD was represented by Mike Barratt, George Salughter, and two observers at the meeting in London on 13 June 1981.

By February 2000 it had 1,755 members, and it merged with the much larger Iron and Steel Trades Confederation on 8 February 2000 to form the basis of the nascent millennial trade union Community, four years before the latter's official launch. By 2014 the membership number was "around 800 people".

== General Secretaries ==
1897: Ben Purse (Northern Section of the League)
1899: Peter Miller
1900: William Banham
1903: Joe Gregory
1926: G. E. Glester
1928: Alec Henderson
1949: Thomas H. Smith
1969: Thomas J. Parker
1979: Mike Barrett
1995: Joe Mann
2013: John Park
