= Charlie Stubbs (footballer) =

English football player and manager

Personal information
- Full name: Charles Frederick Stubbs
- Date of birth: 22 January 1920
- Place of birth: West Ham, England
- Date of death: 12 May 1984 (aged 64)
- Place of death: Bath, Somerset, England
- Position: Centre forward

Senior career*
Years	Team	Apps	(Gls)
- Bamforth's
1944–1948	Darlington	42	(17)
- Uxbridge

Managerial career
- Uxbridge (player-manager)
- * Club domestic league appearances and goals

Charles Frederick Stubbs (22 January 1920 – 12 May 1984) was an English footballer who scored 17 goals from 42 appearances in the Football League playing as a centre forward for Darlington in the 1940s. He joined the club while stationed in the area during the Second World War, and went on to be player-manager of Uxbridge.
