= UFS (trade union) =

Former trade union of the United Kingdom

- UFS
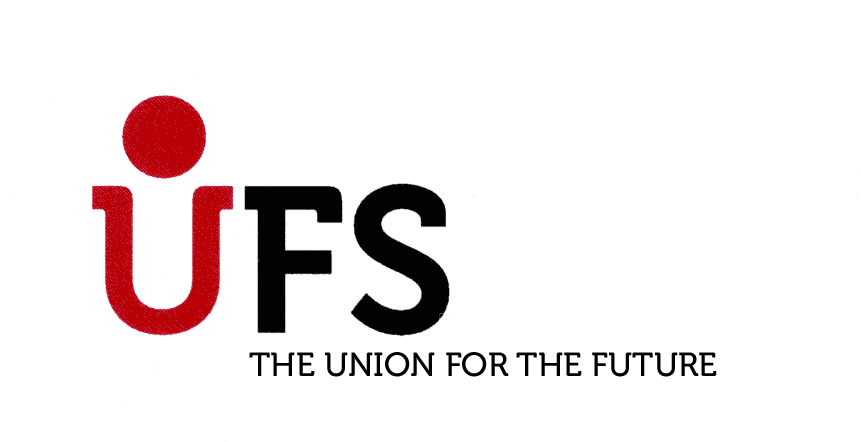
- The Union for the Future
- Merged into: Community
- Founded: 1988
- Dissolved: 1 January 2017
- Headquarters: Cheltenham, Gloucestershire, UK
- Location(s): England Wales Channel Islands Isle of Man
- Members: 2,535
- Key people: Alan Wood, General Secretary; Lynda Merrett, Assistant General Secretary; Sue Horton, NEC Chair
- Affiliations: AfF
- Website: ufsdirect.org

UFS was a trade union representing workers, principally in finance, in the United Kingdom.

The union was established in 1988 with its headquarters in Cheltenham, Gloucestershire. It was a non-profit-making organisation, and was not affiliated to the Trades Union Congress or to any political party, although it was part of the Alliance for Finance.

UFS members came from many different employment sectors and the union had partnership agreements with some of the UK's major employers, including Zurich Financial Services, Capita Group (Life & Pensions), IBM and CSC.

== History ==
An Eagle Star Staff Union merged into the Banking, Insurance and Finance Union (BIFU) in 1981, becoming its Eagle Star Insurance Company Section. In 1988, it split from BIFU, again becoming an independent Eagle Star Staff Union, under the leadership of local organiser Alan Wood. It is from this date that the UFS dated his formation.

Following the takeover of Eagle Star by Zurich Financial Services in 1998, ESSU changed its name to the Union of Finance Staff. It later shortened its name to UFS. At the start of 2017, UFS merged into Community.

== National Executive Committee ==
As a union, UFS was a democratic organisation that is organised into geographic regions, and is controlled by a National Executive Committee (NEC) which was elected by UFS members from different regions.

NEC members were not employed by UFS except the position of General Secretary, which, as well as being an employed position, was also an elected NEC seat. The General Secretary of UFS from 1998 was Alan Wood.
