= School strikes of 1911 =

School student protests in the UK

School strikes
- Part of the Great Unrest
- Date: 1911
- Location: United Kingdom of Great Britain and Ireland
- Caused by: Corporal punishment
- Goals: Abolition of corporal punishment in schools
- Methods: Strike action

The school strikes of 1911 were a series of mass walkouts of schoolchildren in the United Kingdom, protesting against corporal punishment and poor conditions in schools, originating in Llanelli, in Wales. At least 62 towns across the UK saw school strikes in September 1911.

== Background ==
School corporal punishment is the deliberate infliction of physical pain or discomfort and psychological humiliation as a response to undesired behavior by a student or group of students. It often involves striking the student directly with a tool such as a rattan cane, wooden paddle, slipper, leather strap or wooden yardstick. Much of the traditional culture that surrounds corporal punishment in school, at any rate in the English-speaking world, derives largely from British practice in the 19th and 20th centuries, particularly as regards the caning of teenage boys.

== Strikes ==
On 5 September 1911, students erupted in protest at Bigyn council school in Llanelli, Wales, after an assistant teacher unfairly struck a student. Around 32 students walked out of school that morning, marching down the streets of Llanelli and calling for students in other local schools to join them, culminating in a meeting at Park Street Chapel where they attempted to formulate a strategy on what to do next. The walkout, however, ended quickly, after headmaster Gwilym Harris, who had been at home on sick leave and who had previously been investigated by the Llanelli school board for excessive violence, appeared and threatened further punishments.

The Llanelli school strike was initially dismissed by school officials and reporters as just students taking advantage of their headmaster's absence to cause trouble, or just children trying to imitate their parents - there had been a number of strikes across the UK in 1911, the beginning of a period known as the Great Labour Unrest, with a violent police crackdown in Llanelli resulting in several deaths in August. However, word of the strike soon spread to other schools across Wales and the UK. Within the next few days, students in other schools in other cities in Wales began striking against corporal punishment, including in Cardiff and Newport. In Swansea, students took the leather straps that had been used to hit them and used them instead to tie school gates shut.

As the strikes grew, the scope of the demands of the strikers also grew, depending on local circumstances - the length of school hours were often protested against, as a significant number of students had to work to help support their families and suffered from exhaustion as a result of trying to both work and attend all school lessons. Some schools also made cuts to student lunch break periods and to holidays. The school-leaving age and school fees also featured as a point of contention in some strikes, as well as heavy homework loads that students were often effectively unable to meet due to the poverty inflicted on their families leaving home conditions unsuitable for proper studying.

The strikes soon spread outside of Wales, affecting over 60 towns across the United Kingdom, including Liverpool, Manchester, Sheffield, Birmingham, London, and Glasgow. A strike in Dundee on 14 September was reported to have been the biggest, with several thousand students taking part in demonstrations. The students that went on strike were mostly working class, mostly in industrial towns, and both schoolboys and schoolgirls participated, however, reporters tended to focus on strikes led by schoolboys. Some of the strikes were more organised than others, and saw picketing and the formation of committees, whereas some strikes were only a token protest. Most of the strikes were peaceful, with students signing and organising lunches, however, some became heated, such as in East London, where students marched with iron bars and sharpened sticks, or in Dublin, where students threw rotten cabbages at their teachers. Local authorities often responded harshly to strikes, sending attendance officers to homes, with police being called in, students being arrested, and parent threatened with loss of government welfare grants. The leaders of the strikes were particularly targeted - Clyde Roberts, a student of West Indian descent who had led strikes in Cardiff, was held down against a desk and beaten by teachers in front of his classmates, whereas Harry Carly, one of the leaders in Newport, had his father be legally prosecuted for violating compulsory education laws. In Southwark, a six year old and an eight year old were brought before the magistrate on charges of wandering without a guardian. In some schools, teacher convinced non-striking students to attack the strikers and break the strike.

Parents' attitudes towards the strikes varied from city to city, with some newspapers reporting on parents dragging their children back to school and issuing punishments at home, but with parents in other places, especially working-class parents, speaking out in favour of the students. Middle-class adult commentators blamed local authorities for hiring weak teachers who couldn't crack down on students, blamed the press for spreading the stories of the strikes, or blamed nonconformism Protestantism, which was particularly strong in Wales, for reducing Biblical education in day-to-day schooling.

The number of students who participated in the strikes was relatively small compared to the total number of students in the Kingdom, however, there is little reliable data on the precise number of strikers. In the end, the wave of strikes was short-lived, and few of the students' demands were met.

== Aftermath ==
The Great Unrest period from 1911 to 1914 would see a number of other school strikes, most notably the Burston Strike School, where students struck in support of Annie Higdon, a teacher who had been fired for complaining about dire conditions in schools and who was a socialist who had spoken out in favour of local farm labourers.

In the 1970s, in the wake of the protest about school corporal punishment by thousands of school pupils who walked out of school to protest outside the Houses Of Parliament on May 17, 1972, corporal punishment was toned down in many state-ran schools, and whilst many only used it as a last resort for misbehaving pupils, some state-ran schools banned corporal punishment completely, most notably, London's Primary Schools, who had already begun phasing out corporal punishment in the late 1960s.

Britain finally outlawed the practice of corporal punishment in schools in 1987 for state schools, following a 1982 ruling by the European Court of Human Rights that such punishment could not be administered without parental consent, and that a child's "right to education" could not be infringed by suspending children who, with parental approval, refused to submit to corporal punishment, and in 1998 for all private schools.

== See also ==
Burston School Strike (1914)
