= Eileen Atkins =

English actress (born 1934)

Dame Eileen Atkins DBE
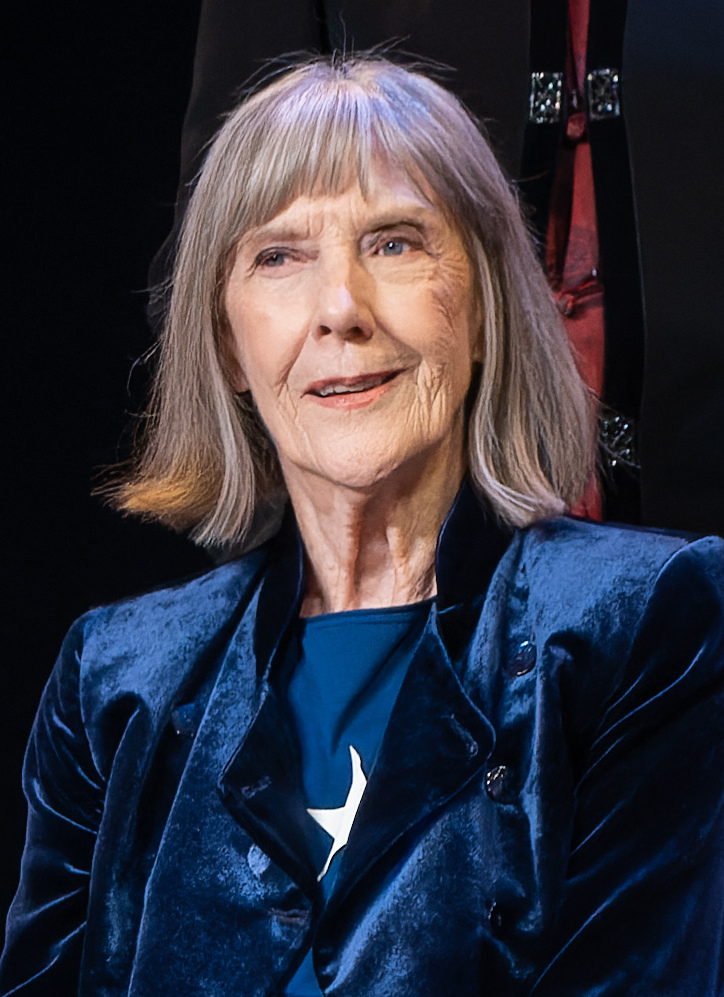
- Atkins in 2023
- Born: Eileen June Atkins; 15 June 1934 (age 92); Clapton, London, England
- Education: Guildhall School of Music and Drama
- Occupations: Actress, writer
- Years active: 1953–present
- Spouses: Julian Glover (m. 1957; div. 1966) Bill Shepherd (m. 1978; died 2016)

Dame Eileen June Atkins (born 15 June 1934) (Note: The birth certificate shows 16 June 1934. Atkins herself relates how she was born just before midnight on 15 June but the nursing home record was completed, and dated, just after midnight on 16 June.) is an English actress and writer. She has worked in the theatre, film, and television consistently since 1953. She is a three-time Olivier Award winner, winning Best Supporting Performance in 1988 (for Multiple roles) and Best Actress for The Unexpected Man (1999) and Honour (2004). In 2008, she won the BAFTA TV Award for Best Actress and the Emmy Award for Outstanding Supporting Actress in a Miniseries or Movie for Cranford. She was appointed Commander of the Order of the British Empire (CBE) in 1990 and Dame Commander of the Order of the British Empire (DBE) in 2001.

Atkins joined the Royal Shakespeare Company in 1957 and made her Broadway debut in the 1966 production of The Killing of Sister George, for which she received the first of four Tony Award nominations for Best Actress in a Play in 1967. She received subsequent nominations for Vivat! Vivat Regina! (1972), Indiscretions (1995) and The Retreat from Moscow (2004). Other stage credits include The Tempest (Old Vic 1962), Exit the King (Edinburgh Festival and Royal Court 1963), The Promise (New York 1967), The Night of the Tribades (New York 1977), Medea (Young Vic 1985), A Delicate Balance (Haymarket, West End 1997) and Doubt (New York 2006).

Atkins co-created the television dramas Upstairs, Downstairs (1971–1975) and The House of Elliot (1991–1994) with Jean Marsh. She also wrote the screenplay for the 1997 film Mrs Dalloway. Her film appearances include I Don't Want to Be Born (1975), Equus (1977), The Dresser (1983), Let Him Have It (1991), Wolf (1994), Jack and Sarah (1995), Gosford Park (2001), Cold Mountain (2003), Vanity Fair (2004), Scenes of a Sexual Nature (2006), Evening (2007), Last Chance Harvey (2008), Robin Hood (2010) and Magic in the Moonlight (2014).

== Early life and education ==
Atkins was born in the Mothers' Hospital in Lower Clapton, a Salvation Army maternity hospital in east London. Her mother, Annie Ellen (née Elkins), was a barmaid who was 46 when Eileen was born, and her father, Thomas Arthur Atkins, was a gas meter reader who was previously under-chauffeur to the Portuguese Ambassador. She was the third child in the family and when she was born the family moved to a council home in Tottenham. Her father did not, in fact, know how to drive and was responsible, as under-chauffeur, mainly for cleaning the car. At the time Eileen was born, her mother worked in a factory by day and then as a barmaid in the Elephant & Castle at night. When Eileen was three, a Romani woman came to their door selling lucky heather and clothes pegs. She saw little Eileen and told her mother that her daughter would be a famous dancer. Her mother promptly enrolled her in a dance class. Although she hated it, she studied dancing from age 3 to 15 or 16. From age 7 to 15, which covered the last four years of the Second World War (1941–45), she danced in working men's club circuits for 15 shillings a time as "Baby Eileen". During the war, she performed as well at London's Stage Door canteen for American troops and sang songs like "Yankee Doodle." At one time she was attending dance class three or four times a week.

Once, when she was given a line to recite, someone told her mother that she had a Cockney accent. Her mother was appalled but speech lessons were too expensive for the family. Fortunately, a woman took interest in her and paid for her to be educated at Parkside Preparatory School in Tottenham. Eileen Atkins has since publicly credited the Principal, Miss Dorothy Margaret Hall, for the wise and firm guidance under which her character developed. From Parkside she went on to The Latymer School, a grammar school in Edmonton, London. By 12, she was a professional in panto in Clapham and Kilburn. One of her grammar school teachers who used to give them religious instruction, an Ernest J. Burton, spotted her potential and, without charge, rigorously drilled away her Cockney accent. He also introduced her to the works of William Shakespeare. She studied under him for two years.

When she was 14 or 15 and still at Latymer, Atkins also attended "drama demonstration" sessions twice a year with this same teacher. At around this time (though some sources say she was 12), her first encounter with Robert Atkins took place. She was taken to see Atkins' production of King John at the Regent's Park Open Air Theatre. She wrote to him saying that the boy who played Prince Arthur was not good enough and that she could do better. Atkins wrote back and asked that she come to see him. On the day they met, Atkins thought she was a shop girl and not a school girl. She gave a little prince speech and he told her to go to drama school and come back when she was older.

Burton came to an agreement with Eileen's parents that he would try to get her a scholarship for one drama school and that if she did not get the scholarship he would arrange for her to do a teaching course in some other drama school. Her parents were not at all keen on the fact that she would stay in school until 16 as her sister had left at 14 and her brother at 15 but somehow they were persuaded. Eileen was in Latymer's until 16. Out of 300 applicants for a RADA scholarship, she got down to the last three but was not selected, so she did a three-year course on teaching at the Guildhall School of Music and Drama. But, although she was taking the teaching course, she also attended drama classes and in fact performed in three plays in her last year. This was in the early 1950s. In her third and last year she had to teach once a week, an experience she later said she hated. She graduated from Guildhall in 1953.

As soon as she left Guildhall, Atkins got her first job with Robert Atkins in 1953: as Jaquenetta in Love's Labour's Lost at the same Regent's Park Open Air Theatre where she was brought to see Atkins' King John production years before. She was also, very briefly, an assistant stage manager at the Oxford Playhouse until Peter Hall fired her for impudence. She was also part of repertory companies performing in Billy Butlin's holiday camp in Skegness, Lincolnshire. It was there when she met Julian Glover.

It took nine years (1953–62) before she was working steadily.

== Career ==
=== Theatre ===
Atkins joined the Guild Players Repertory Company in Bangor, County Down, Northern Ireland, as a professional actress in 1952. She appeared as the nurse in Harvey at the Repertory Theatre, Bangor, in 1952. In 1953 she appeared as an attendant in Love's Labours Lost at the Regent's Park Open Air Theatre. Her London stage debut was in 1953 as Jaquenetta in Robert Atkins's staging of Love's Labour's Lost at the Open Air Theatre in Regent's Park.

Atkins has regularly returned to the life and work of Virginia Woolf for professional inspiration. She has played the writer on stage in Patrick Garland's adaptation of A Room of One's Own and also in Vita and Virginia. She won the Drama Desk Award for Outstanding One-Person Show and an Obie Award for A Room of One's Own in which she also played in the 1990 television version; she also provided the screenplay for the 1997 film adaptation of Woolf's novel Mrs. Dalloway, and made a cameo appearance in the 2002 film version of Michael Cunningham's Woolf-themed novel, The Hours.

Atkins joined the Stratford Memorial Theatre Company in 1957 and stayed for two seasons. She was with the Old Vic in its 1961–62 season (she appeared in the Old Vic's Repertoire Leaflets of February–April 1962 and April–May 1962).

=== Film and television ===
Atkins appeared as Maggie Clayhanger in all six episodes of Arnold Bennett's Hilda Lessways from 15 May to 19 June 1959, produced by BBC Midlands with Judi Dench and Brian Smith. In the 1960 Shakespeare production An Age of Kings she played Joan of Arc.

Atkins helped create two television series. Along with fellow actress Jean Marsh, she created the concept for an original television series, Behind the Green Baize Door, which became the award-winning ITV series Upstairs, Downstairs (1971–75). Marsh played maid Rose for the duration of the series but Atkins was unable to accept a part because of stage commitments. The same team was also responsible for the BBC series The House of Eliott (1991–93).

Atkins' film and television work includes appearing as Dornford Yates' villainess Vanity Fair in the BBC adaptation of She Fell Among Thieves (1978), Sons and Lovers (1981), Smiley's People (1982), Oliver Twist (1982), Titus Andronicus (1985), A Better Class of Person (1985), Roman Holiday (1987), The Lost Language of Cranes (1991), Cold Comfort Farm (1995), Talking Heads (1998), Madame Bovary (2000), David Copperfield (2000), Wit (2001) and Bertie and Elizabeth (2002), Cold Mountain (2003), What a Girl Wants (2003), Vanity Fair (2004), Ballet Shoes (2005) and Ask the Dust (2006).

In the autumn of 2007, Atkins co-starred with Dame Judi Dench and Sir Michael Gambon in the BBC One drama Cranford playing the central role of Miss Deborah Jenkyns. This performance earned her the 2008 BAFTA Award for best actress, as well as the Emmy Award. In September 2007 she played Abigail Dusniak in Waking the Dead Yahrzeit (S6:E11-12).

In 2009 Atkins played the evil Nurse Edwina Kenchington in the BBC Two black comedy Psychoville. Atkins replaced Vanessa Redgrave as Eleanor of Aquitaine in the blockbuster movie Robin Hood, starring Russell Crowe, which was released in the UK in May 2010. The same year, she played Louisa in the dark comedy film Wild Target.

Atkins and Jean Marsh, creators of the original 1970s series of Upstairs, Downstairs, were among the cast of a new BBC adaptation, shown over the winter of 2010–11. The new series is set in 1936. Marsh again played Rose while Atkins was cast as the redoubtable Maud, Lady Holland. In August 2011, it was revealed that Atkins had decided not to continue to take part as she was unhappy with the scripts. In September 2011, Atkins joined the cast of ITV comedy-drama series Doc Martin playing the title character's aunt, Ruth Ellingham. She remained with the series until the show ended in 2022.

Atkins starred as Lady Spence with Matthew Rhys in an adaptation of Daphne du Maurier's The Scapegoat, shown in September 2012.

Atkins has portrayed Queen Mary on two occasions, in the 2002 television film Bertie and Elizabeth and in the 2016 Netflix-produced television series The Crown.

In 2018 Atkins starred in a British documentary titled Nothing Like a Dame, directed by Roger Michell, which documents conversations between actresses Atkins, Judi Dench, Maggie Smith and Joan Plowright, which were interspersed with scenes from their careers on film and stage. The film was released in the United States as Tea with the Dames. Peter Bradshaw of The Guardian gave the film a five out of five star rating, declaring it an "outrageously funny film". Guy Lodge of Variety called the film a "richly enjoyable gabfest" but that the film was "hardly vital cinema".

Atkins portrayed graduate school professor Evelyn Ashford to Vivian Bearing (Emma Thompson) in Wit, a 2001 American television movie directed by Mike Nichols. The teleplay by Nichols and Emma Thompson is based on the 1999 Pulitzer Prize winning play of the same title by Margaret Edson. The film was shown at the Berlin International Film Festival on 9 February 2001 before being broadcast by HBO on 24 March. It was shown at the Edinburgh Film Festival and the Warsaw Film Festival later in the year.

=== Radio ===
Atkins had a guest role in BBC Radio 4's long-running rural soap The Archers in September 2016, playing Jacqui, the juror who persuades her fellow jurors to acquit Helen Titchener (née Archer) of the charge of attempted murder and wounding with intent of her abusive husband, Rob.

== Personal life ==
Atkins was married to actor Julian Glover in 1957; they divorced in 1966. A day after his divorce, Glover married actress Isla Blair. She married her second husband, Bill Shepherd, on 2 February 1978. Shepherd died on 24 June 2016.

In 1997, she wrote the screenplay for Mrs Dalloway, starring Vanessa Redgrave. The film received positive reviews but was a box-office failure. It was a financial disaster for Atkins and her husband, who had invested in it. She said of this incident: "I have to work. I was nearly bankrupted over Mrs Dalloway, and if you are nearly bankrupted, you are in trouble for the rest of your life. I don't have a pension. In any case, it doesn't hurt me to work. I think it's quite good, actually."

All through my career, I have tried to do new work, but there is a problem in the West End as far as new work is concerned. As a theatregoer, I get bored with seeing the same old plays again and again. I felt terrible the other night because I bumped into Greta Scacchi and she asked me if I was coming to see her in The Deep Blue Sea. I said, 'Greta, I'm so old, I've seen it so many times. I've seen it with Peggy Ashcroft, with Vivien Leigh, with Googie Withers, with Penelope Wilton and I played it myself when I was 19. I can't bring myself to see it again.' She was very sweet about it.

In 1995, Atkins was diagnosed with breast cancer and treated for the condition. Living alone in widowhood during the COVID lockdown, Atkins completed her autobiography Will She Do?. She read an abridged version on BBC Radio 4.

== Acting credits ==
=== Film ===
Year	Title	Role	Notes
1968	Inadmissible Evidence	Shirley	
1975	I Don't Want to Be Born	Sister Albana	
1977	Equus	Hester Saloman	
1983	The Dresser	Madge	
1991	Let Him Have It	Lilian Bentley	
1994	Wolf	Mary	
1995	Jack and Sarah	Phil	
1998	The Avengers	Alice	
1999	Women Talking Dirty	Emily Boyle	
2001	Gosford Park	Mrs. Croft	
2002	The Hours	Barbara	
2003	Cold Mountain	Maddy	
2003	What a Girl Wants	Dowager Lady Jocelyn Dashwood	
2003	A Long Weekend in Pest and Buda	Amanda	
2004	Vanity Fair	Miss Matilda Crawley	
2004	The Queen of Sheba's Pearls	School Matron	
2005	The Feast of the Goat	Aunt Adelina	
2006	Ask the Dust	Mrs. Hargraves	
2006	Scenes of a Sexual Nature	Iris	
2007	Evening	Night Nurse	
2008	Last Chance Harvey	Maggie Walker	
2010	Robin Hood	Eleanor of Aquitaine	
2010	Wild Target	Louisa Maynard	
2012	The Scapegoat	Lady Spence	
2013	Beautiful Creatures	Gramma Emmaline Duchannes	
2014	Magic in the Moonlight	Aunt Vanessa	
2016	ChickLit	Peggy Law	
2017	Paddington 2	Madame Kozlova	
2018	Nothing Like a Dame	Herself	Documentary
2023	Wicked Little Letters	Mabel	
2026	Bunker	Eileen	

=== Television ===
Year	Title	Role	Notes
1959	Hilda Lessways	Maggie Clayhanger	6 episodes
1960	An Age of Kings	Performer	3 episodes
1961	Emergency Ward 10	Miss Spinks	2 episodes
1961	ITV Playhouse	Girl	Episode: "The Square"
1964	Z-Cars	Grace Patchett	Episode: "A Stroll Along the Sands"
1964	The Massingham Affair	Charlotte Verney	6 episodes
1964–1965	ITV Play of the Week	Norma/Kathy	2 episodes
1965	Knock on Any Door	Ruth	Episode: "Close Season"
1966	Major Barbara	Barbara	Television film
1968	Theatre 625	Eileen	Episode: "Party Games"
1968	Half Hour Story	Her	Episode: "Nothing's Ever Over"
1968	The Sex Game	Performer	Episode: "Women Can Be Monsters"
1965–1969	The Wednesday Play	Performer	4 episodes
1969–1970	W. Somerset Maugham	Various	2 episodes
1970	Solo	Mary Kingsley	Episode: "Eileen Atkins as Mary Kingsley"
1972	Stage 2	The Duchess	Episode: "The Duchess of Malfi"
1969–1972	BBC Play of the Month	Performer	4 episodes
1974	The Lady from the Sea	Ellida Wangel	Television film
1975	Affairs of the Heart	Kate Cookman	Episode: "Kate"
1978	She Fell Among Thieves	Vanity Fair	Television film
1980	Sons and Lovers	Gertrude Morel	Mini-series; 7 episode
1981	Celebrity Playhouse	Stella Kirby	Episode: "Eden's End"
1982	Smiley's People	Madame Ostrakova	4 episodes
1982	Oliver Twist	Mrs. Mann	Television film
1983	Nelly's Version	Nelly Dean	Television film
1985	The Burston Rebellion	Kitty Higdon	See Burston Strike School
1986	Breaking Up	Mrs. Mailer	4 episodes
1985–1987	Screen Two	Performer	2 episodes
1987	A Hazard of Hearts	Lady Harriet's Maid	Television film
1991	A Room of One's Own	Virginia Woolf	Television film
1992	The Lost Language of Cranes	Rose Benjamin	Television film
1992	Mistress of Suspense	Mrs. Waggoner	Episode: "The Stuff of Madness"
1993	Performance	Mrs. May Maitland	Episode: "The Maitlands"
1995	Cold Comfort Farm	Judith Starkadder	Television film
1997	A Dance to the Music of Time	Brightman	Episode: "Post War"
1998	Talking Heads 2	Celia	Episode: "The Hand of God"
2000	Tales from the Madhouse	The Mourner	Episode: "The Mourner"
2000	David Copperfield	Miss Jane Murdstone	Television film
2001	The Sleeper	Violet Moon	Television film
2001	Wit	Evelyn Ashford	Television film
2002	Bertie and Elizabeth	Queen Mary	Television film
2003	Love Again	Eva Larkin	Television film
2007	Agatha Christie's Marple	Lady Tressilian	Episode: "Towards Zero"
2007	Waking the Dead	Abigail Dusniak	Episode: Yahrzeit
2007	Cranford	Miss Deborah Jenkyns	2 episodes
2007	Ballet Shoes	Madame Fidolia	Television film
2009–2011	Psychoville	Edwina Kenchington	8 episodes
2010	Upstairs Downstairs	Maud, Lady Holland	3 episodes
2010	Agatha Christie's Poirot	Princess Natalia Dragomiroff	Episode: "Murder on the Orient Express"
2010	Rosamunde Pilcher's Shades of Love	Violet Aird	2 episodes
2014	This Is Jinsy	Miss Penny	Episode: "Penny's Pendant"
2016	The Crown	Queen Mary	Main role; 5 episodes
2017	Carnage	Dorothy	Television film
2011–2022	Doc Martin	Ruth Ellingham	46 episodes

=== Theatre ===
Year	Title	Role	Playwright	Venue
1957	Cymbeline	Performer	William Shakespeare	Shakespeare Memorial Theatre
1957	The Tempest	Performer	William Shakespeare	Shakespeare Memorial Theatre; Theatre Royal, Drury Lane
1957	The Vigil	Magdalen	Ladislas Fodor	Shakespeare Memorial Theatre
1958	Romeo and Juliet	Performer	William Shakespeare	Shakespeare Memorial Theatre
1958	Hamlet	Lady	William Shakespeare	Shakespeare Memorial Theatre
1958	Pericles	Diana	William Shakespeare	Shakespeare Memorial Theatre
1958	Much Ado About Nothing	Performer	William Shakespeare	Shakespeare Memorial Theatre
1958–1959	Romeo and Juliet, Hamlet	Performer, Lady	William Shakespeare	Tour
1961	Roots	Beatie Bryant	Arnold Wesker	Bristol Old Vic
1961	The Square	Girl	Marguerite Duras	Bromley Little Theatre
1962	Twelfth Night	Viola	William Shakespeare	The Old Vic
1962	Richard III	Queen	William Shakespeare	The Old Vic
1962	The Tempest	Miranda	William Shakespeare	The Old Vic
1962	Semi-Detached	Eileen Midway	David Turner	Saville Theatre
1963	The Provoked Wife	Lady Brute	John Vanbrugh	Georgian Theatre, Richmond, Yorkshire; Vaudeville Theatre
1963	Exit the King	Juliette	Eugène Ionesco	Edinburgh Festival; Royal Court Theatre
1965	The Sleepers' Den	Mrs. Shannon	Peter Gill	Royal Court Theatre
1965–1966	The Killing of Sister George	Alice McNaught	Frank Marcus	Bristol Old Vic; Duke of York's Theatre
1966–1967	The Killing of Sister George	Alice McNaught	Frank Marcus	Belasco Theatre, Broadway
1966	The Restoration of Arnold Middleton	Joan Middleton	David Storey	Royal Court Theatre
1967	The Promise	Lika	Aleksei Arbuzov	Henry Miller's Theatre, Broadway
1968	The Cocktail Party	Celia Coplestone	T. S. Eliot	Chichester Festival Theatre; Wyndham's Theatre; Theatre Royal Haymarket
1970–1971	Vivat! Vivat Regina!	Elizabeth I	Robert Bolt	Chichester Festival Theatre; Piccadilly Theatre
1972	Vivat! Vivat Regina!	Elizabeth I	Robert Bolt	Broadhurst Theatre, Broadway
1973	Suzanna Andler	Suzanna Andler	Marguerite Duras	Aldwych Theatre
1973	As You Like It	Rosalind	William Shakespeare	Royal Shakespeare Theatre
1975	Heartbreak House	Hesione Husbaye	George Bernard Shaw	The Old Vic
1977	The Night of the Tribades	Marie Caroline David	Per Olov Enquist	Helen Hayes Theatre, Broadway
1977	St. Joan	St. Joan	George Bernard Shaw	The Old Vic; Liverpool Playhouse
1978	The Lady's Not For Burning	Jennet Jourdemayne	Christopher Fry	The Old Vic
1978	Twelfth Night	Viola	William Shakespeare	The Old Vic
1981	Passion Play	Nell	Peter Nichols	Aldwych Theatre
1984	Serjeant Musgrave's Dance	Mrs. Hitchcock	John Arden	The Old Vic
1986	Medea	Medea	Euripides	The Young Vic
1988	The Winter's Tale	Paulina	William Shakespeare	Cottesloe Theatre
1988	Cymbeline	Queen	William Shakespeare	Cottesloe Theatre
1988	Mountain Language	Elderly Woman	Harold Pinter	Lyttelton Theatre
1989	Exclusive	Sally Kershaw	Jeffrey Archer	Theatre Royal, Bath; Strand Theatre
1990	A Room of One's Own	Virginia Woolf	Patrick Garland	Hampstead Theatre; Playhouse Theatre
1992	The Night of the Iguana	Hannah Jelkes	Tennessee Williams	Lyttelton Theatre
1992–1994	Vita and Virginia	Virginia Woolf	Eileen Atkins	Minerva Theatre, Chichester; Ambassadors Theatre; Union Square Theatre, Off-Broadway
1995	Indiscretions	Leonie	Jean Cocteau	Ethel Barrymore Theatre, Broadway
1996	John Gabriel Borkman	Mrs. Gunhild Borkman	Henrik Ibsen	Lyttelton Theatre
1996	Hermione Lee on Virginia Woolf	Reader	Hermione Lee	Cottesloe Theatre
1997	A Delicate Balance	Agnes	Edward Albee	Theatre Royal Haymarket
1998	The Unexpected Man	Woman	Yasmina Reza	The Pit, London; Duchess Theatre
2000	The Unexpected Man	Woman	Yasmina Reza	Promenade Theatre, Off-Broadway
2003	Honour	Honour	Joanna Murray-Smith	Cottesloe Theatre
2004	The Retreat from Moscow	Alice	William Nicholson	Booth Theatre, Broadway
2005	The Birthday Party	Meg	Harold Pinter	Duchess Theatre, London
2006	Doubt	Sister Aloysius	John Patrick Shanley	Walter Kerr Theatre, Broadway
2007	There Came A Gypsy Riding	Bridget	Frank McGuinness	Almeida Theatre, London
2008	The Sea	Mrs. Rafi	Edward Bond	Theatre Royal, Haymarket
2008	The Female of the Species	Margot Mason	Joanna Murray-Smith	Vaudeville Theatre
2009	Harold Pinter: A Celebration	Performer	Harold Pinter	Olivier Theatre
2012	All That Fall	Maddy Rooney	Samuel Beckett	Jermyn Street Theatre; Arts Theatre
2013	All That Fall	Maddy Rooney	Samuel Beckett	59E59 Theatre, New York City
2014	The Witch of Edmonton	Elizabeth Sawyer	William Rowley	Swan Theatre, Stratford-upon-Avon
2014–2016	Ellen Terry with Eileen Atkins	Ellen Terry	Eileen Atkins	Sam Wanamaker Playhouse
2018	The Height of the Storm	Madeleine	Florian Zeller	Wyndham's Theatre
2019	The Height of the Storm	Madeleine	Florian Zeller	Samuel J. Friedman Theatre, Broadway
2023	4000 Miles	Vera Joseph	Amy Herzog	Minerva Theatre, Chichester

=== Music video ===
Year	Title	Artist
1968	"Child of the Moon"	The Rolling Stones

== Accolades and honours ==
Atkins was appointed a Commander of the Order of the British Empire (CBE) in the 1990 Birthday Honours. She was promoted to Dame Commander of the Order of the British Empire (DBE) on her 67th birthday in the 2001 Queen's Birthday Honours "for services to Drama." On 23 June 2010, she was awarded the degree of Doctor of Letters, honoris causa, by Oxford University and is an Honorary Fellow of St Hugh's College, Oxford. On 5 December 2005 she received the degree of Doctor of Arts, honoris causa, from City University London. She is a member of the American Theater Hall of Fame; she was inducted in 1998.

=== Theatre Awards ===
==== Tony Awards ====
Year	Category	Work	Result	Ref.
1967	Best Actress in a Play	The Killing of Sister George	Nominated	
1972	Best Actress in a Play	Vivat! Vivat Regina!	Nominated	
1995	Best Actress in a Play	Indiscretions	Nominated	
2004	Best Actress in a Play	The Retreat from Moscow	Nominated	

==== Drama Desk Awards ====
Year	Category	Work	Result	Ref.
1972	Outstanding Performance	Vivat! Vivat Regina!	Won	
1978	Featured Actress in a Play	The Night of the Tribades	Won	
1991	Outstanding Solo Performance	A Room of One's Own	Won	
1995	Honorary Award	—N/a	Won	
2001	Outstanding Actress in a Play	The Unexpected Man	Nominated	
2004	Outstanding Actress in a Play	The Retreat from Moscow	Nominated	

==== Olivier Awards ====
Year	Category	Work	Result
1978	Best Actress in a Revival	Twelfth Night	Nominated
1981	Best Actress in a New Play	Passion Play	Nominated
1988	Best Supporting Performance	Cymbeline; The Winter's Tale; Mountain Language	Won
1992	Best Supporting Actress	The Night of the Iguana	Nominated
1997	Best Actress	John Gabriel Borkman	Nominated
1999	Best Actress	The Unexpected Man	Won
2004	Best Actress	Honour	Won
2018	Best Actress	The Height of the Storm	Nominated

==== The Offies ====
Year	Category	Work	Result
2012	Best Female Performance	All That Fall	Won

=== Film and Television Awards ===
Year	Award	Category	Work	Result
1970	BAFTA TV Award	Best Actress	BBC Play of the Month; W. Somerset Maugham; The Wednesday Play	Nominated
1983	BAFTA Film Award	Best Supporting Actress	The Dresser	Nominated
2001	Screen Actors Guild	Outstanding Ensemble – Film	Gosford Park	Won
2002	Broadcast Film Critics Association	Best Acting Ensemble	Gosford Park	Won
2002	Florida Film Critics Circle	Best Ensemble Cast	Gosford Park	Won
2002	Phoenix Film Critics Society	Best Ensemble	Gosford Park	Nominated
2002	Satellite Award	Best Cast – Film	Gosford Park	Won
2008	BAFTA TV Award	Best Actress	Cranford	Won
2008	Golden Globe Award	Best Supporting Actress – Television	Cranford	Nominated
2008	Emmy Award	Outstanding Supporting Actress in a Miniseries or a Movie	Cranford	Won
2011	Emmy Award	Outstanding Supporting Actress in a Miniseries or a Movie	Upstairs Downstairs	Nominated

== See also ==
- List of British actors
- List of Royal National Theatre Company actors
- List of actors in Royal Shakespeare Company productions
- List of Primetime Emmy Award winners
