= National railway strike of 1911 =

First national strike of railway workers in Britain

National railway strike
- Part of Great Unrest
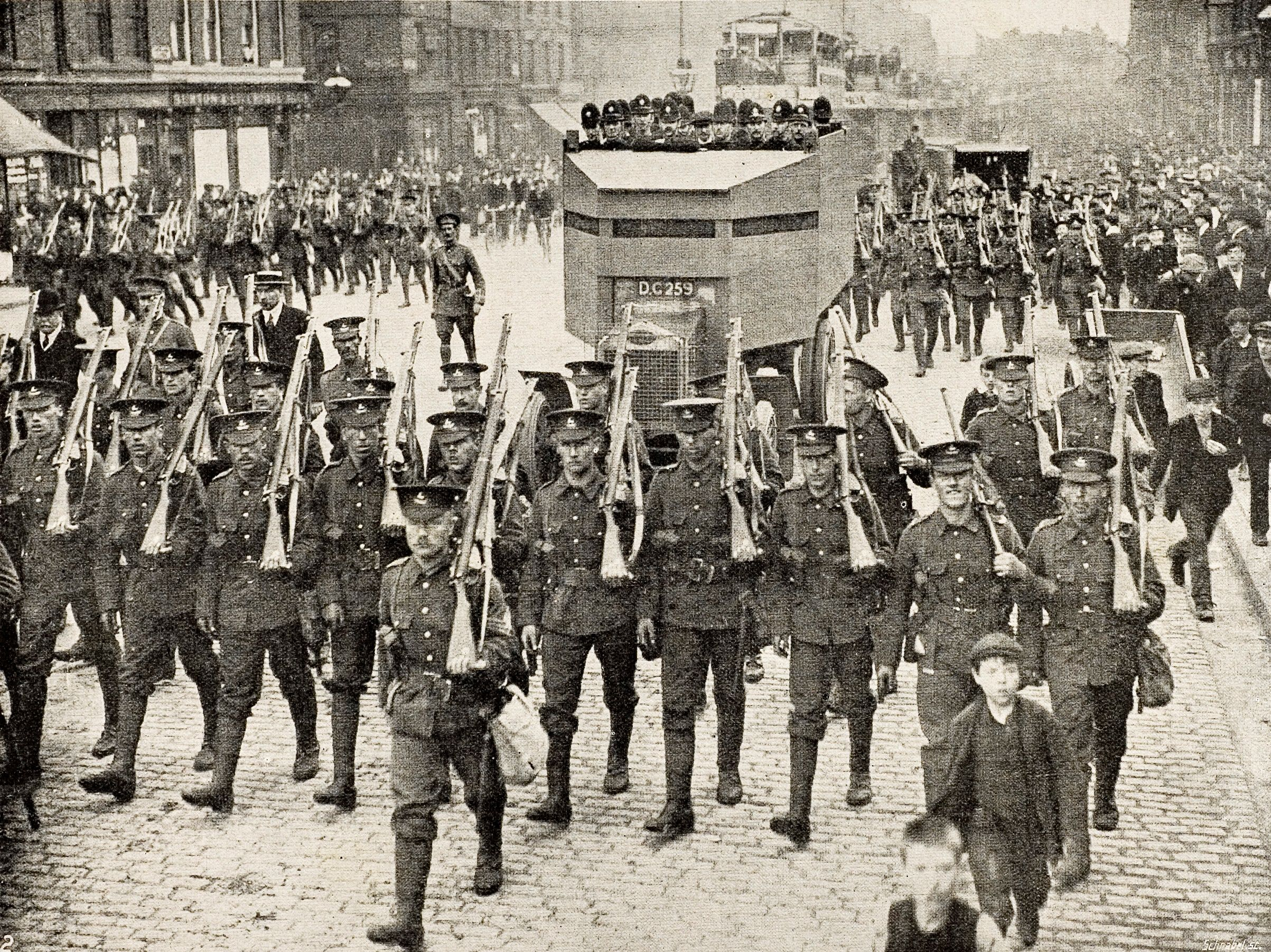
- Police and soldiers march through Liverpool during the strike
- Date: 1911
- Location: United Kingdom of Great Britain and Ireland
- Caused by: Labour disaffection amongst railway workers
- Methods: Strike action

The national railway strike of 1911 was the first nation-wide strike of railway workers in Britain. It took place during a period of labour unrest sometimes characterised as the Great Unrest.

The strike arose from longstanding disputes between workers and railway companies, combined with the desire of the unions to assert their unity and strength. The strike lasted only two days, but the show of strength succeeded in forcing the Liberal Government to set up a royal commission to examine the workings of the 1907 Conciliation Board. The strike also led to the Llanelli Riots, in which two people died in clashes between railway workers and troops, which had been sent in to stop the blockade of the line by strikers.

== Origins ==
The strike arose from widespread dissatisfaction with the activities of the so-called "conciliation boards" which had been set up to negotiate between workers and rail companies. A series of local disputes led to unofficial action in July and early August 1911. A meeting of the main rail unions was arranged in Liverpool to coordinate action nationally. Delegates were from the Associated Society of Locomotive Engineers and Firemen (ASLEF), The Amalgamated Society of Railway Servants (ASRS), the General Railway Workers' Union (GRWU) and the United Pointsmen and Signalmen's Society (UPSS). The unions issued an ultimatum to the rail companies to accept direct negotiation with their representatives within 24 hours or a national strike would be called.

The government were keen to ensure that the railways would not be shut down. The Prime Minister, H. H. Asquith told the rail companies that police and troops would be deployed to help keep the trains running. Troops were "marched into London and 32 other towns in England and Wales". The Home Secretary, Winston Churchill suspended the Army Regulation, which required that local authorities needed to request troops before they were sent.
