= Timeline of Llanelli history =

This article is a timeline of Llanelli history. For a full article on the town, see Llanelli.

== 600s ==
St. Ellyw, a child or grandchild of king Brychan and a disciple of Cadoc built a church, and lent his name to the town.

== 1600s ==
1607 – Oldest Map of Wales. Created by William Camden. Llanelly a small Town in South Wales where Machynys is shown to be a separate island called Bach hannis

1682 – Creation of Llanelly Church

1683 – Start of parish records

== 1700s ==
1714 - Llanelly House construction started.

1772 – John Wesley visits Llanelly.

1779 – Wesley visits again.

1780 – Independent chapel established at Capel Als.

1785 – Calvinist Methodist church established at Gelli On.

1791 – Blast furnace set up in Cwmddyche by Gevers and Ingman.

1795 – Alexander Raby begins to operate mining and melting of metal ores. Llanelly's population recorded as less than 500.

== 1800s ==
1801 – Llanelly's first census – population 2,972.

1802 – Establishment of foundry and engineering works by Waddle in New Dock.

1803 – Carmarthenshire Railway or Tramroad opened in May 1803. It had closed down by 1844, but the same trackway was used by the Llanelly and Mynydd Mawr Railway more than 80 years later.

1805 – Llanelly's copper works established by Daniel & Co.

1809 – Llanelly is hit by floods. Jubilee of King George celebrated by townsfolk. Establishment of Capel Newydd.

1810

- Erw Fawr coal pit founded by General Ward.
- Population: 2,972.

1813 – Box coal pit opened.

1822 – Sion Chapel founded.

1823 – Part of Parish Church is built.

1828 – Six bells put in tower of the Parish Church. Upper and Lower Markets opened. Wesleyan church built.

1829 – Construction of Hall Street and New Road begin. Railway allowed between St Davids and Machynys. R.J. Nevill buys all coal pits belonging to General Ward.

1830 – Cambrian copper works opened.

1831 – Town population recorded as 7,646.

1832 –

- Seventeen persons die in Llanelly after the town is hit by cholera.
- Llanelly was added as a contributory borough to the Carmarthen parliamentary district.

1834 - Llanelly Railway opened.

1835 – New Dock opened in Llanelly, the gas company is formed and the local industrialist Alexander Raby dies.

1839 – Swansea Road workhouse opened.

1840 –

- The Llanelly Pottery was established. Closed 1923.
- Population: 4,173.

1847 - Copperworks School was established, it is the oldest School in Llanelly. Built by Richard Janion Nevill, son of Charles Nevill of the Copperworks in Llanelly

1850 - St. Elli Parish Church Lynch gates and stocks were removed.

1875 – Llanelli RFC, one of the most storied rugby union clubs in Wales, is formed; though the club itself misidentified its formation date as 1872.

1879 – Stradey Park opens as the home of Llanelli RFC. It remained the home for Llanelli RFC for nearly 130 years, and later for the regional side Scarlets, but closed in November 2008 when the teams' new home, Parc y Scarlets, opened in nearby Pemberton.

1886 - Parc Howard Museum opened.

1895 – Host the National Eisteddfod of Wales

1895 – Lanelli General Hospital opened

1897 - Stamping works opens in Seaside Llanelli.

1898 - Initial founding of Llanelly Steel Works Limited (later Duport Steel).

== 1900s ==
1901 - Population: 25,617.

1903 – Hosts the National Eisteddfod for a second time.

1904 - A train derails as it was over speeding, killing five and injuring 94 people.

1906 - St Elli Church, Llanelli rebuilt.

1909 - Llanelli Star begins publication.

1911 – Riots occur as a part of railway strikes during 'the great unrest'. On 17 August, strikers at Llanelli held up trains at one of the level crossings in the town. The army was called in the next day and two bystanders were shot dead. Railway trucks carrying detonators were set on fire, causing an explosion that killed four people.

1911 - Palace Theatre, later called the Vint's Palace was established.

1912 - St. Elli Parish Church Llanelly. Lych Gates were replaced.

1920 - The Royal Theatre (Haggars) opens in Market Street Llanelli

1930 – Hosts the National Eisteddfod.

1930 - The Regal Cinema opens in Llanell.

1934 - The Ritz Ballroom opens in Llanelli.

1962 – Hosts the National Eisteddfod.

1970 -

- The first Horse Race Track opened in Machynys. Owner Scrap and Merchant Bobby Bradley of Morfa Ynys Farm Llanelli.
- Llanelli transmitting station built.

1972 – "The Day the Pubs Ran Dry"—31 October, when Llanelli RFC defeated the touring All Blacks of New Zealand 9-3 (10-3 in today's scoring system) before a crowd of 26,000 at Stradey Park. Pubs throughout the town ran dry serving fans celebrating the win.

1990 – Prince Philip Hospital construction completed

1995 - Our Lady Queen of Peace Church opened.

== 2000s ==
2000 – Hosts the National Eisteddfod.

2008 –

- 24 October—Stradey Park hosts its last match, an EDF Energy Cup contest in which the Scarlets defeat Bristol 27–0.
- 15 November—Parc y Scarlets opens with a match between Llanelli RFC and Cardiff RFC, with the home team comfortably winning 32–3.

2009 – 31 January—The official opening ceremony of Parc y Scarlets is held; the main event is a match between the Scarlets and the Barbarians, with the Scarlets winning 40–24.

== 2010s ==
- Hosts the 2014 National Eisteddfod

== 2020s ==
- 2020 - Llanelli goes into a local lockdown due to the COVID-19 pandemic. It was the first town-only lockdown in Wales.
- 2023 - Protesters camp outside of the Stradey Park Hotel after Home Office plans to house asylum seekers there were revealed. Arrests were made at the site.
- 2024 - the town's Chamber of Trade and Commerce leads a campaign for the town to become Wales' eighth city.
