= The Retreat from Moscow =

Play by William Nicholson

- Original language: English
- Written by: William Nicholson
- Characters: Edward; Jamie; Alice
- Setting: England, the present

Premiere
- Date: October 1999
- Place: Chichester Festival Theatre

The Retreat from Moscow is a play written by William Nicholson.

The play is about the end of a three-decade marriage and the subsequent emotional fallout. The title is taken from Napoleon's costly invasion of Moscow and the subsequent retreat. It was first performed at the Chichester Festival Theatre in October, 1999. It was eventually produced in New York on Broadway at the Booth Theatre, on October 23, 2003 with John Lithgow, Eileen Atkins and Ben Chaplin, under the direction of Daniel Sullivan.

In 2019 the play was adapted by Nicholson into the feature film Hope Gap with Annette Bening, Bill Nighy and Josh O'Connor.

== Recognition ==
- 2004 Tony Award nominations: Best Play, Best Actress in a Play, Best Featured Actor in a Play
