= 1911 Liverpool general transport strike =

- Part of the Great Unrest
- Date: June – August 1911
- Location: Liverpool
- Methods: General strike
- Result: Strike suppressed

Parties
National Sailors' and Firemen's Union	Liverpool City Police; 18th Royal Hussars

Lead figures
Tom Mann	Winston Churchill

Number
80,000 workers and supporters	3,500 British Army troops

Casualties
- Deaths: 2 people
- Injuries: 365 people

== Summary ==
The 1911 Liverpool general transport strike was a major protest of unskilled workers including dockers, railway workers, sailors and other tradesmen for the right to unionize, along with better pay and conditions. For the first time, unskilled trade unions were able to establish themselves on a permanent footing and become genuine mass organizations of the working class. The strike paralyzed Liverpool commerce for most of the summer of 1911 since Liverpool's industry was based around ports, whose workers were striking. The strike peaked on Sunday August 13 also known as "Bloody Sunday" when a crowd of 80,000 congregated in the city center. Two days later on August 15, protestors attacked a prisoner transport and the police opened fire resulting in the death of two and wounding 13 more. The strikes ended on the 24 August 1911 when their demands were met.

== Beginning of the strike ==
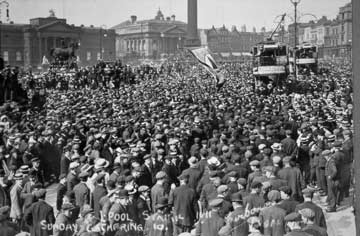
Strikers

Strike action began on 14 June when the National Sailors' and Firemen's Union announced a nationwide merchant seamen's strike. Solidarity action in support of the seamen led to many other sections of unskilled workers, such as dockers, railway workers, and many more professions striking for the right to unionize. As a port city. these workers striking caused the city to be paralyzed.

A strike committee, chaired by the syndicalist Tom Mann, was formed to represent all of the workers in dispute. Many meetings were held on St. George's Plateau, next to St. George's Hall, on Lime Street, including the rally on the 13th of August in which a crowd of 80,000 people, gathered to hear Tom Mann speak. This event became known as "Bloody Sunday".

== Bloody Sunday ==
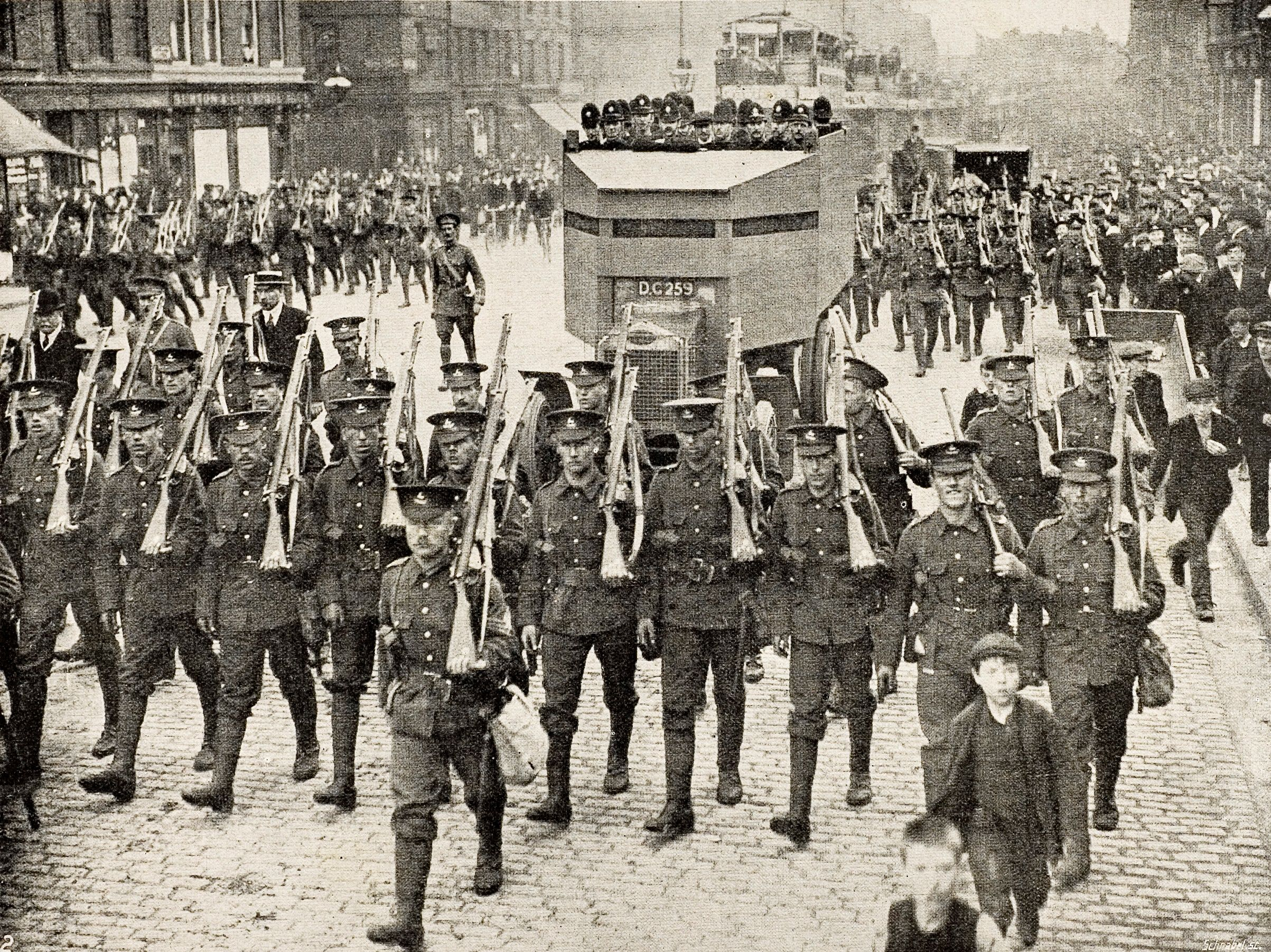
Policemen in Liverpool were protected by military

Bloody Sunday was the most significant day of the general transport strike. On this day roughly 80,000 protestors were given permission to gather at St. George's Plateau. The head constable had called in many police and military reinforcements and placed them inside of St. Georges Hall. When fights started breaking out they initiated a baton charge on the crowd.

After the charge took place four doctors took care of the injured. There were 186 people that had to be taken to the hospital and many more that went undocumented as they went home. There were also rumors that the police were waiting outside of the hospital which likely dissuaded the modest cases. Total estimates for those injured were around 350.

Of the 80,000 attendees only 95 faced charges after this event with a majority of charges being assaulting a police officer and throwing missiles.

After this event Home Secretary Winston Churchill also sent in 3,500 armed troops to patrol the streets and positioned the cruiser HMS Antrim in the Mersey.

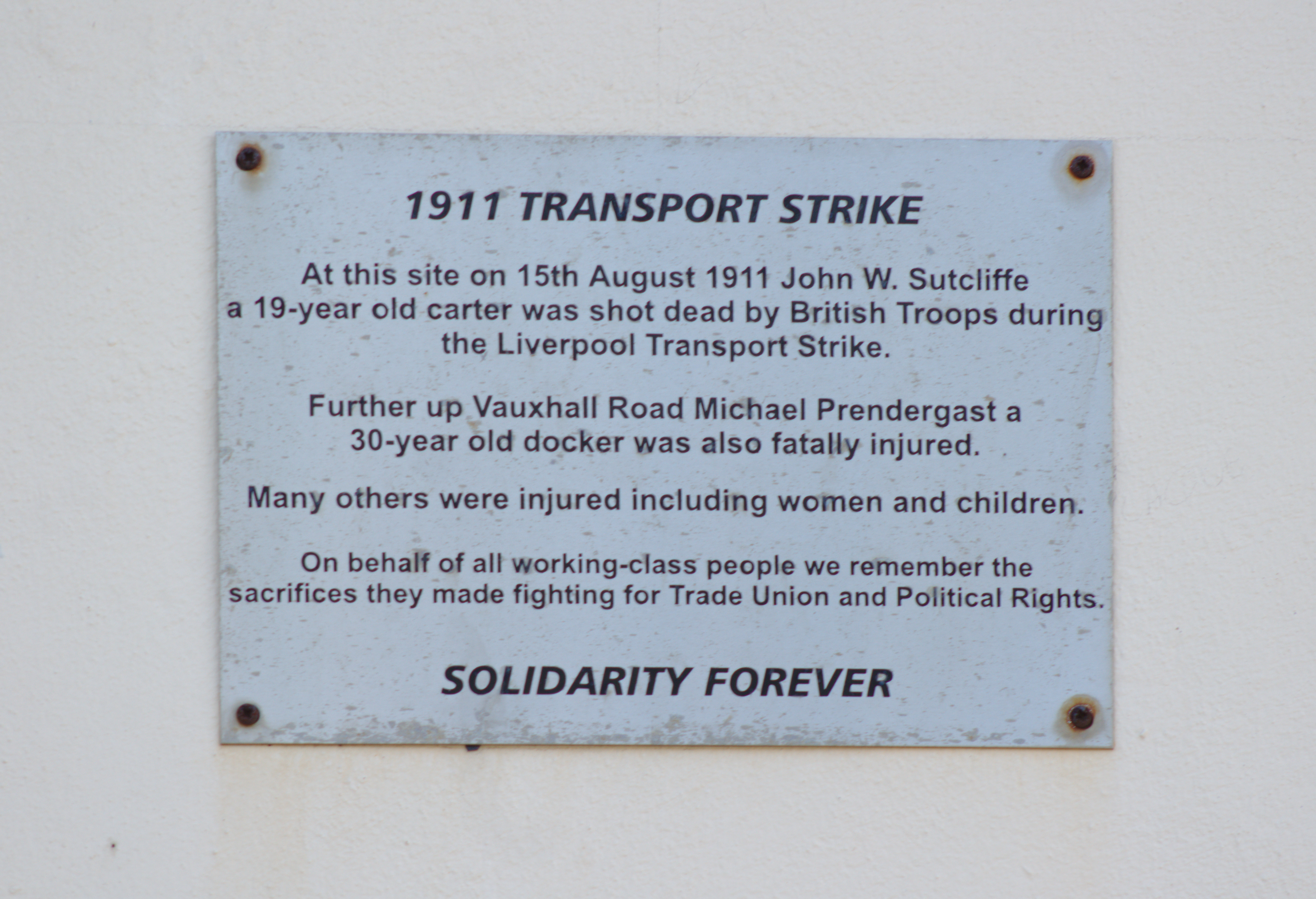
Plaque memorizing two deaths

== August 15 shooting ==
Two days later, as a prison transport was passing with prisoners who were arrested on Bloody Sunday, crowds began throwing objects at the transport. Soldiers of the 18th Hussars opened fire on a crowd on Vauxhall Road, injuring fifteen, two fatally: John Sutcliffe, a 19-year-old carter, was shot twice in the head, and Michael Prendergast, a 30-year-old docker, was shot twice in the chest. An inquest into their deaths later brought in a verdict of "justifiable homicide".

== See also ==
- Great Unrest
