= Burston Strike School =

School and museum founded as consequence of strike in Norfolk, UK

Coordinates: 52.4047°N 1.1397°E

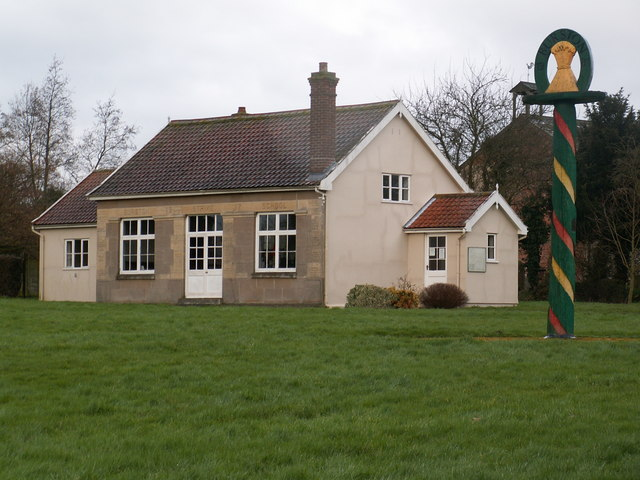

Information
- Established: 1914
- Founders: Annie Higdon; Tom Higdon
- Closed: 1939

The Burston Strike School was founded as a consequence of a school strike and became the centre of the longest running strike in British history, that lasted from 1914 to 1939 in the village of Burston in Norfolk, England. Today, the building stands as a museum to the strike. Every year hundreds of people turn up for a rally to commemorate the 25-year strike of Annie and Tom Higdon.

== History ==
The strike began when teachers at the village's Church of England school, Annie Higdon and her husband, Tom Higdon, were sacked after a dispute with the area's school management committee. The schoolchildren – led by Violet Potter – went on strike in their support. Encouraged by the community, the Higdons went on to set up an alternative school, which was initially attended by 66 of their 72 former pupils. Beginning in a marquee on the village green, the school moved to a local carpenter's premises and later to a purpose-built school financed by donations from the labour movement. Burston Strike School carried on teaching local children until shortly after Tom's death in 1939.

== Background to the strike ==
Annie Katherine Schollick, known as Kitty, married Tom Higdon, the son of a farm labourer, in 1896. They lived first in London before moving to Wood Dalling in Norfolk in 1902. This coincided with publication of an Education Bill in Parliament which offered education to working class children.

Kitty was appointed headmistress at Wood Dalling School, with Tom an assistant teacher. Identifying themselves with the local farm labourers, the Higdons ran up against almost immediate resentment from the school managers, who were mostly farmers. They objected to the cold, insanitary conditions of the school and especially protested at the farmers taking children away to work on the land whenever they were needed. Eventually, after a complete breakdown of relationships, the Norfolk Education Committee gave the Higdons a choice: accept dismissal or transfer to another school. They took up the latter offer and moved to the Burston School in 1911.

Arriving at Burston, the Higdons found conditions were no different. The newly arrived rector, the Reverend Charles Tucker Eland, was appointed chairman of the School Managing Body. Eland intended to recover the powers the Church had lost to the parish councils. He demanded deference and recognition of his right to lead the community. His situation, with an annual salary of £581 and a large comfortable rectory, contrasted starkly with the farm labourers and their families, living on average wages of £35 a year in squalid cottages. Their employers, themselves mostly tenants of brewery-owned land, naturally allied with the rector.

In 1913, after organising among the local agricultural labourers, Tom Higdon successfully stood for election to the parish council, topping the poll with Eland failing to be elected, against his expectation. However, although the rector and the farm owners had been defeated in the parish council election, they still had control of the school's managing body and were determined to use this power to victimise the Higdons. Since their arrival in Burston, the Higdons had complained about conditions in the school, particularly the dampness, inadequate heating and lighting, lack of ventilation and general unhygienic conditions. Looking for a pretext for action, the managers accused Kitty of lighting a fire without their permission – to dry the clothes of children who had walked three miles to school in the rain. She was also accused of gross discourtesy when reprimanded for this act. In addition, Kitty was accused of beating two Barnardo's girls. Despite her pacifist principles, the school managers found there was "good ground for the complaints of the Barnardo foster mother" and they demanded the Higdons be transferred.

Tom and Kitty demanded an inquiry be undertaken by the local Norfolk Education Authority Committee. Due to illness, Kitty was unable to attend, and the legal representative appointed by the National Union of Teachers failed to call any witnesses in her defence as they were being held back for a possible slander case. Despite that, the beating accusation was declared to be not proven. Only the final accusation of discourtesy to the managers was accepted and that was deemed sufficient to give the Higdons three months' notice.

== The Strike School ==
The Higdons' dismissal took effect on 1 April 1914. As the authorities were taking over, the sound of children marching and singing could be heard. Of the school's 72 pupils, 66 had gone on strike, marching around the village waving flags. None of them returned to the school, but instead had lessons on the village green. This alternative "school" was well equipped, maintained a full timetable and observed registrations with the full support of parents. The authorities were in no mood to tolerate this defiance, and 18 parents were summonsed to court and fined for failing to ensure their children's attendance at school. Collections outside the court paid the fines, and since the parents were sending their children to the school of their choice, the authorities were soon forced to back down.

Word of the strike quickly spread and it became a central issue for trade unionists and school reformers throughout the country. There were regular visits of supporters and speakers. With the onset of winter, the school moved into empty workshops. The authorities kept up their intimidation, with farmers sacking farm labourers (which also meant eviction from their tied cottages). This could not be maintained, because a shortage of labour during the First World War meant that they had to be re-employed. Striking families who rented land from the rector for growing food were evicted and their crops and property destroyed. The village's Methodist preacher, who held services on the village green on Sundays for families of the Strike School children, was censured by his church.

At the end of the first year of the strike, with the lease on the old workshops due to expire, an appeal was made for funds to build a new school. By 1917, a national appeal had reached £1,250 with donations from miners' and railway workers' unions, Trades councils, Independent Labour Party branches and Co-operative Societies. The new school was officially declared open on 13 May 1917, with the leader of the 1914 demonstration, Violet Potter, declaring, "With joy and thankfulness I declare this school open to be forever a School of Freedom."

The Burston Strike School continued until 1939. Tom Higdon died on 16 August 1939. By that time Kitty, now aged in her seventies, was unable to carry on alone, and the last eleven pupils transferred to the council's school. Kitty moved to a nursing home in Swainsthorpe and she died on 24 April 1946. They are buried side-by-side in Burston churchyard, adjacent to the Strike School building.

== Subsequent events ==
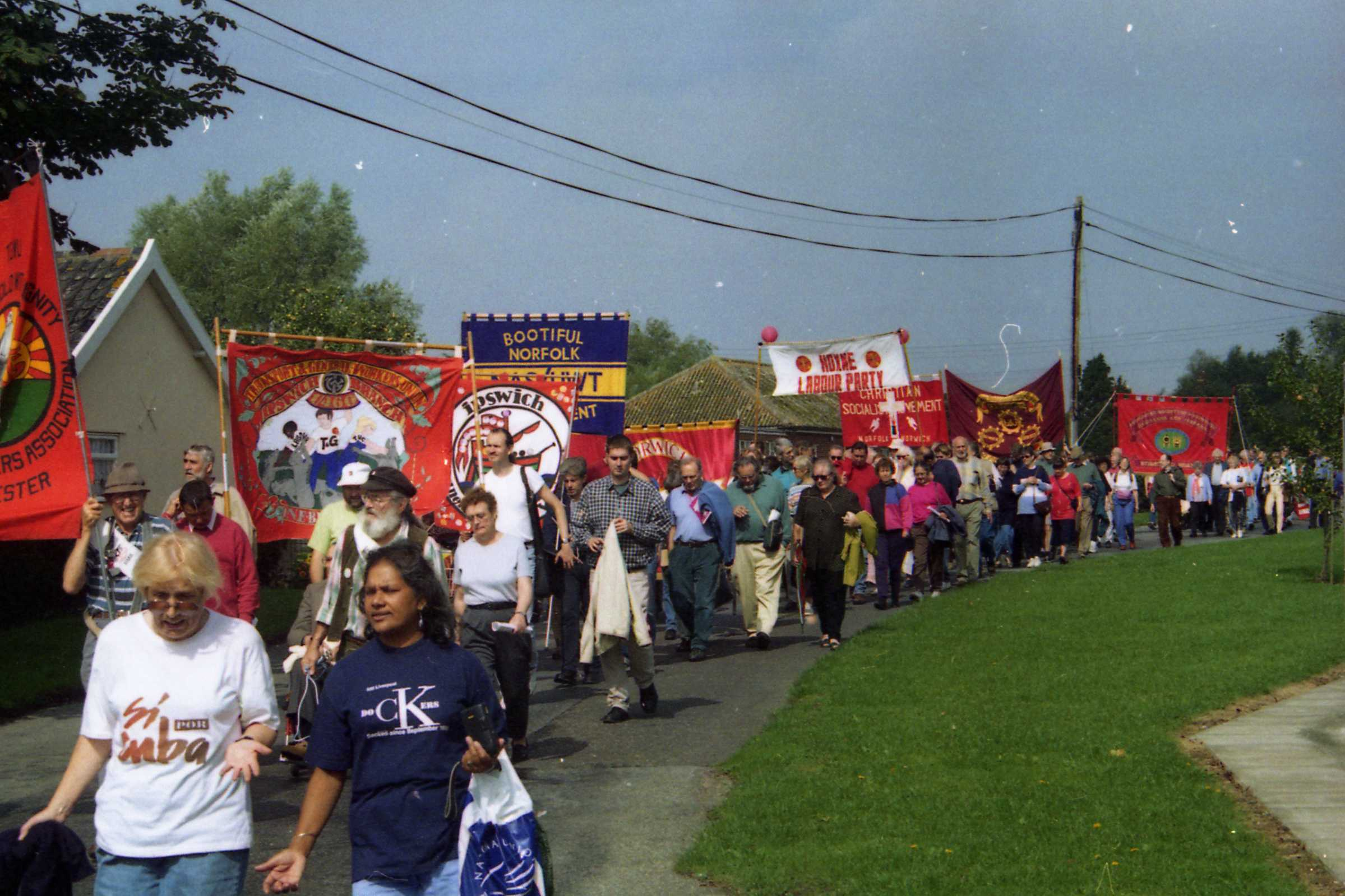
Trade Union and Labour Party Banners, Burston in 1998

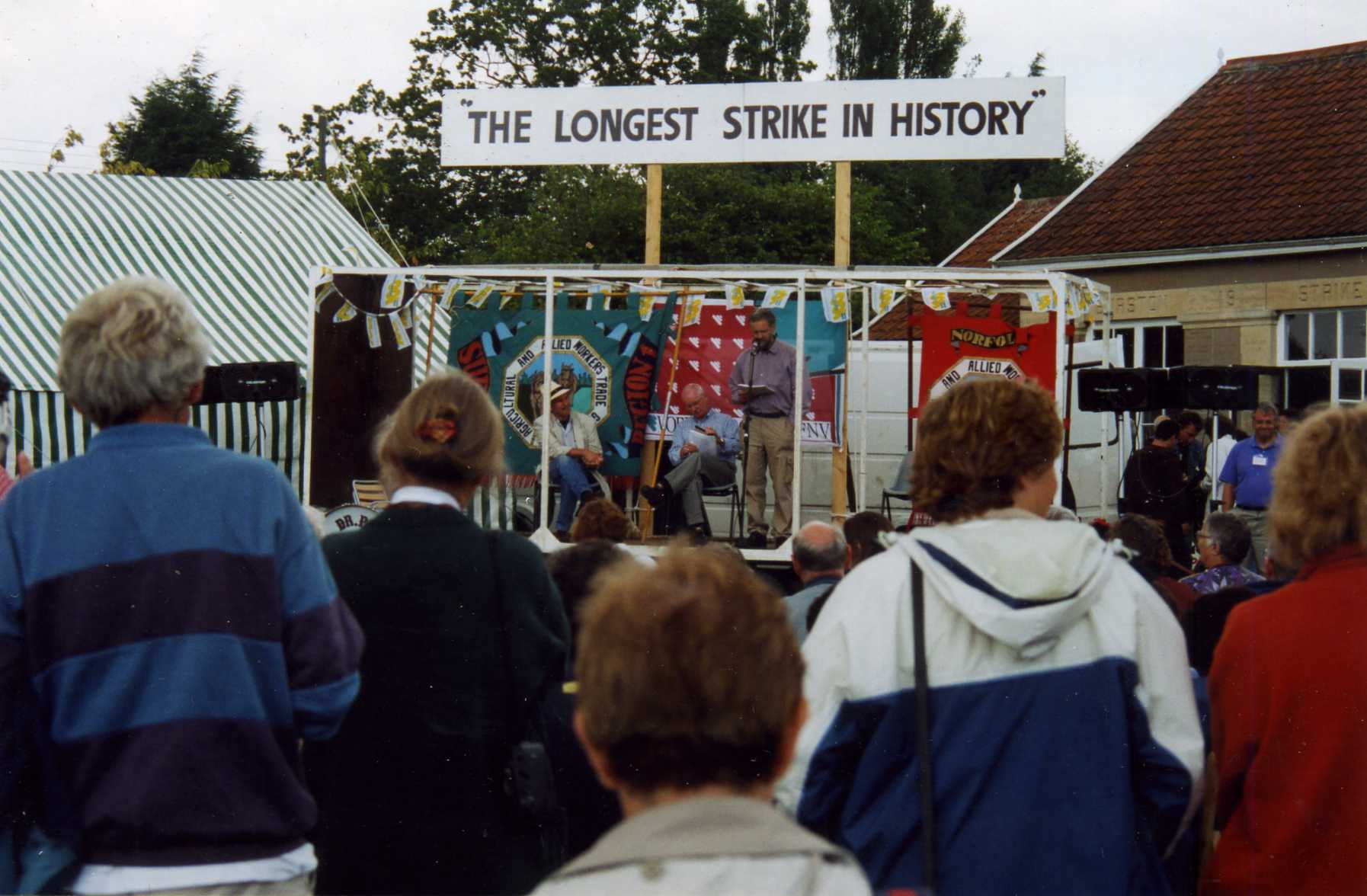
Jeremy Corbyn speaking. On the right, the strike school building, with the various carved blocks recording the financial support received from diverse sources

In 1949, the National Union of Agricultural Workers (NUAW) initiated the establishment of The Burston Strike School as a registered educational charity. Along with Sol Sandy, the surviving trustee of the strike school and a member of the NUAW, three additional trustees were appointed from the union. The self-perpetuating trustees have the legal responsibility to manage the school and try to develop it as a museum, visitor centre, educational archive and village amenity.

In the early 1980s the NUAW merged into the Transport and General Workers' Union (TGWU) to form the National Agriculture and Allied Workers' sector. It was at that time that the Strike School was turned into a museum and a rally to commemorate the school and the longest strike in UK history was re-established. The annual rally has been held on the first Sunday in September since 1984. It is organised by the trustees, members of TGWU (now Unite the Union) with support from other trade union organisations.

== Dramatisations ==
=== Television ===
The story of the strike was dramatised in 1985 by the BBC. Screen Two: The Burston Rebellion, written by Elaine Morgan, starred Eileen Atkins as Kitty Higdon, Bernard Hill as Tom Higdon, John Shrapnel as the Reverend Charles Tucker Eland and Nicola Cowper as Violet Potter. It was shown on 24 February 1985, following a documentary about the strike the previous day.

=== Film ===
In 2015, it was announced that a film adaptation of the strike would be produced for general release in 2017. Titled Burston, the producers aimed to film in summer 2017 with a release in 2018. However, filming was halted in 2017. The film was to be directed by the Norfolk-raised director George Moore with a screenplay written by Alice Instone-Brewer. The cast included Jasmine Fretwell as Violet Potter, Niklass van Poorvleit as Tom Higdon and Robert Clement-Evans as Rev. Eland. The filmmakers were reportedly working closely with the Burston Strike School Museum to ensure that the film represented the strike accurately and had hired a largely Norfolk-based cast and crew to reflect the regional origins of the story.

== See also ==
- School strikes of 1911 in the United Kingdom
