= Burston, Norfolk =

Village in Norfolk, England

Coordinates: 52.40°N 1.15°E

Burston
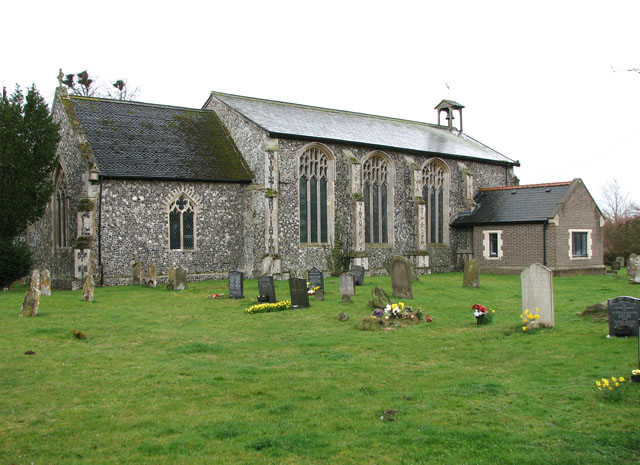
- St. Mary's Church

- Location within Norfolk
- Area: 9.17 km^{2} (3.54 sq mi)
- Population: 568 (2011)
  - Density: 62/km^{2} (160/sq mi)
- Civil parish: Burston and Shimpling
- District: South Norfolk
- Shire county: Norfolk
- Region: East
- Country: England
- Sovereign state: United Kingdom
- Post town: DISS
- Postcode district: IP22
- Dialling code: 01379
- UK Parliament: Waveney Valley

Burston is a village in the civil parish of Burston and Shimpling, in the South Norfolk district, in Norfolk, England. It is 2 1/2 miles (4.0 km) north-east of Diss and 16 miles (26 km) south-west of Norwich.

== History ==
Burston's name is of Anglo-Saxon origin, and in the Domesday Book it is recorded as a settlement of 41 households in the hundred of Diss that waspart of the estates of William the Conqueror and Robert Malet.

The local pub, The Crown, dates to the 17th century and still operates.

Burston railway station on the Great Eastern Main Line between Norwich and London Liverpool Street closed in 1966.

On 1 April 1935, the parish of Shimpling was merged with Burston. On 10 July 1983, the new parish was renamed to "Burston and Shimpling". In 1931 the parish of Burston (prior to the merge) had a population of 279. This was the last time separate population statistics for Burston were collected in the census.

== School ==
From 1914 to 1939, Burston was the scene of the longest strike in history when schoolteachers Tom and Annie Higdon went on strike in protest over unhygienic and inadequate schooling conditions for the local children. The children were instead invited to attend Burston Strike School, which was originally located on the village green before moving to the new school building in 1917. The building was funded by public subscription, with the patrons' names (including Leo Tolstoy) carved into bricks used to build the school.

In 1949, the school building was registered as an educational charity and is currently operated by a board of trustees as a museum, visitor centre, village amenity and educational archive. A rally to commemorate the strike has been organised on the first Sunday of September every year since 1984 by the Transport and General Workers' Union and its successor organisation, Unite the Union.

== St. Mary's Church ==
Burston's parish church is dedicated to Saint Mary and dates from the 15th century. The tower collapsed in 1753 and was never rebuilt. The building is Grade II listed. The church was restored in the 19th century and again in 2013, and has a set of royal arms from the reign of James I. Tom and Annie Higdon, leaders of the Burston Strike School, are buried side-by-side in the churchyard.

== Notable people ==
- Annie Higdon (1864–1946) teacher, lived and worked in Burston
