= Llanelli riots of 1911 =

1911 railway strike riots in Wales where troops shot dead two strikers

Llanelli Riots
- Part of the Great Unrest and National railway strike of 1911
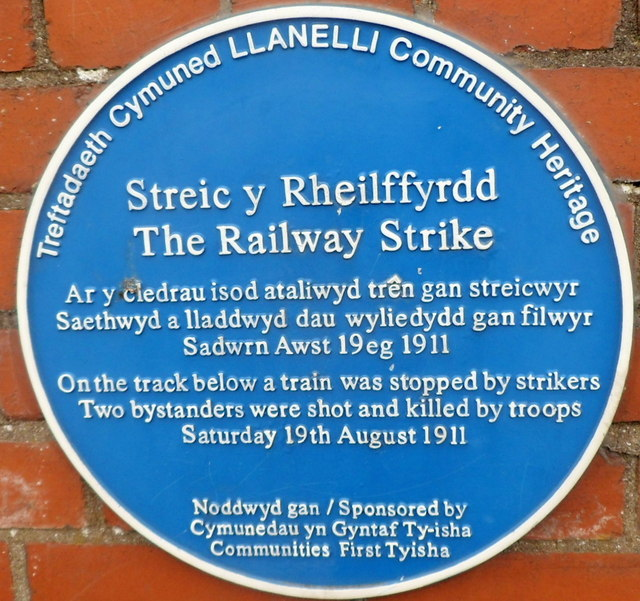
- 1911 Railway Strike fatalities plaque, Llanelli
- Date: 18–19 August 1911
- Location: Llanelli, Carmarthenshire, Wales
- Caused by: National railway strike of 1911
- Goals: Railway workers' rights, opposition to strikebreaking
- Methods: Strike action; Mass picketing; Rioting
- Result: Strike settled by negotiation; troops deployed; fatalities occurred

Parties
Railway strikers and local residents	Employers: Great Western Railway; Armed forces: Worcestershire Regiment; Government: Local magistrates

Lead figures
Richard Squance (strike committee chairman)	Major Brownlow Stuart; Winston Churchill (Home Secretary)

Number
Mass picket	Detachment from Worcestershire Regiment

Casualties
- Deaths: 6 total (2 shot by troops, 4 killed in explosion)
- Injuries: Multiple injuries from rioting
- Damage: Railway infrastructure, magistrates' homes attacked
- Buildings destroyed: Railway trucks set on fire
- Highlighted tensions between labour and state during Great Unrest

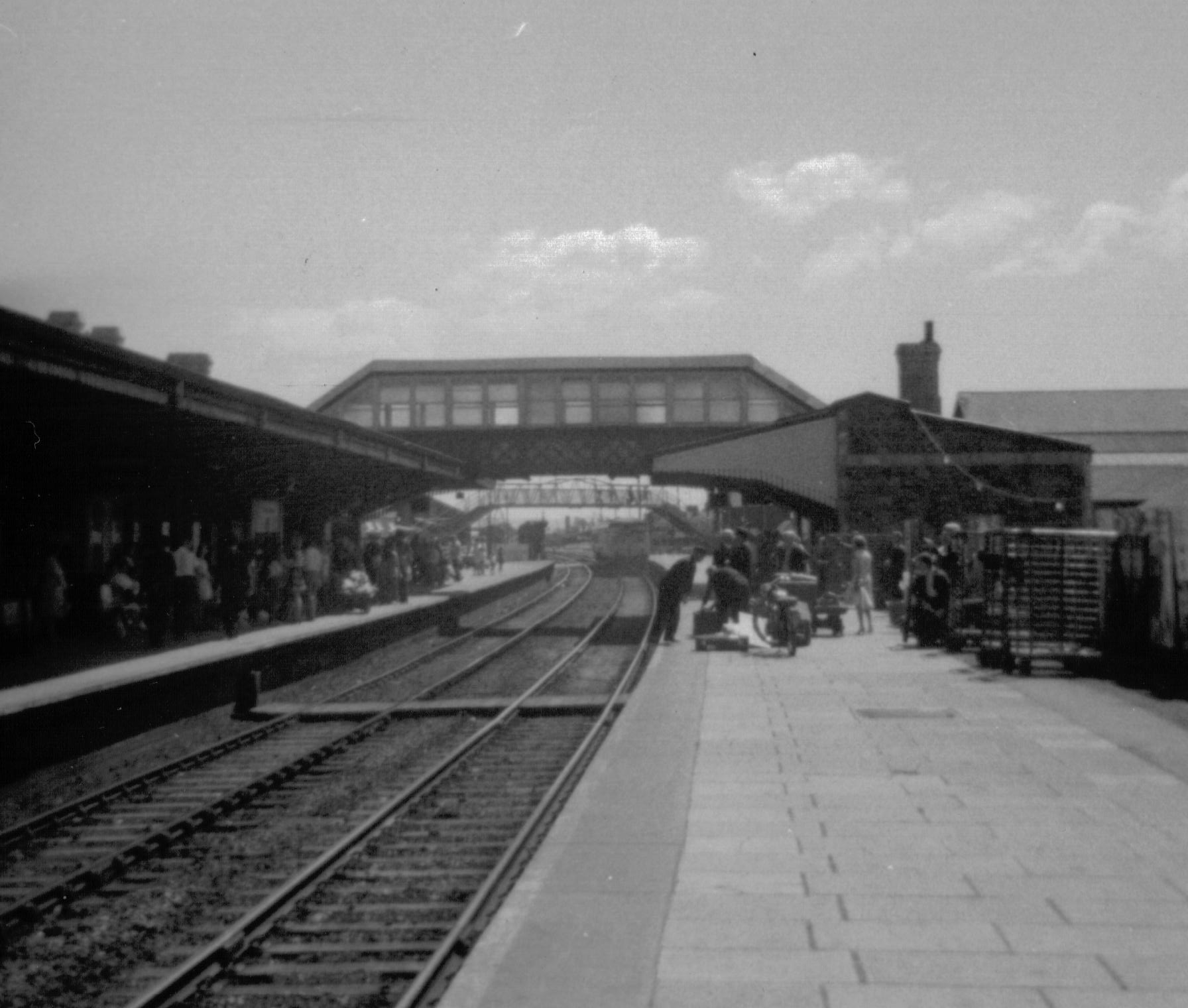
Llanelli railway station, pictured in 1971, was where the strike originated.

The Llanelli riots were a series of events precipitated by the national railway strike of 1911 at Llanelli, Carmarthenshire in Wales. Mass picketing action at Llanelli railway station was brutally suppressed by the police, resulting in the deaths of two men, shot dead by troops of the Worcestershire Regiment. Rioting followed and magistrates' homes were attacked and railway trucks were set on fire, resulting in an explosion which killed a further four people.

The incident was highly politically sensitive, as the Great Western Railway through Carmarthenshire, southwestern Wales, was the main route between England and Ireland. The Riots occurred during the period of frequent strikes referred to as the Great Unrest and involved prominent figures on the international scene such as David Lloyd George, Winston Churchill, King George V, and Kaiser Wilhelm of Germany.

== Strike and mass picket ==
The two-day industrial action took place on Friday 18 and Saturday 19 August 1911. It was part of the first national railway strike. A joint committee of trade unions was created to co-ordinate industrial action in the town, chaired by Richard Squance. It organised a mass picket in Llanelli due to the ease with which strikers could blockade the Great Western Railway at Llanelli railway station. The strike itself lasted only two days; it started on Thursday evening, and by Saturday evening a negotiated settlement had been reached. However, by this time a series of clashes with strikers had led to the deployment of a detachment from the Worcestershire Regiment. The involvement of the army was approved by the then Home Secretary, Winston Churchill.

== Shootings ==
On 19 August, during the negotiations, a train containing strikebreaking workers was held up. The commanding officer of the troops, Major Brownlow Stuart, ordered his men to use bayonets to disperse the crowd. The train passed slowly, but was pursued by strikers who boarded it and put out the engine fire, immobilising it. Troops followed, but found themselves boxed in a cutting, as miners approached, some throwing stones. Stuart asked the local Justice of the Peace to read the strikers the Riot Act, which he apparently mumbled reluctantly. Stuart then ordered his men to fire shots towards the crowd. Two young men were shot dead. One was a 21-year-old tinplate worker named John 'Jac' John, who "had joined the picket line to support his less fortunate townsmen." The other was a 19-year-old youth named Leonard Worsell, who was not involved in the conflict, but had just come out into his back garden when he heard the commotion. In his report Major Stuart claimed his soldiers were firing warning shots, and were unaware of the men when they did so, but other witnesses claim they were deliberately targeted.

== Riot ==
The troops action sparked not only the strikers, but also other residents of Llanelli into a day of widespread disorder and rioting. One man was killed when he attempted to use dynamite to open an armoured freight carriage, unaware that the cargo was munitions, resulting in a massive explosion. On the following day three more people died from injuries sustained in the blast. Local historian John Edwards believes a conspiracy between Liberals and the chapels promoted shame though his aunt referred to the Worcesters as "the murderers". As such the riots were rarely spoken of in the town, such that most of its later residents were unaware of one of the more significant events in its history.

== See also ==
- 1911 in Wales
- Timeline of Llanelli history
- National coal strike of 1912
- Tonypandy riots, 1910–11
