= Great Unrest =

Labour revolt in the United Kingdom, 1911–1914

- Part of Edwardian Era
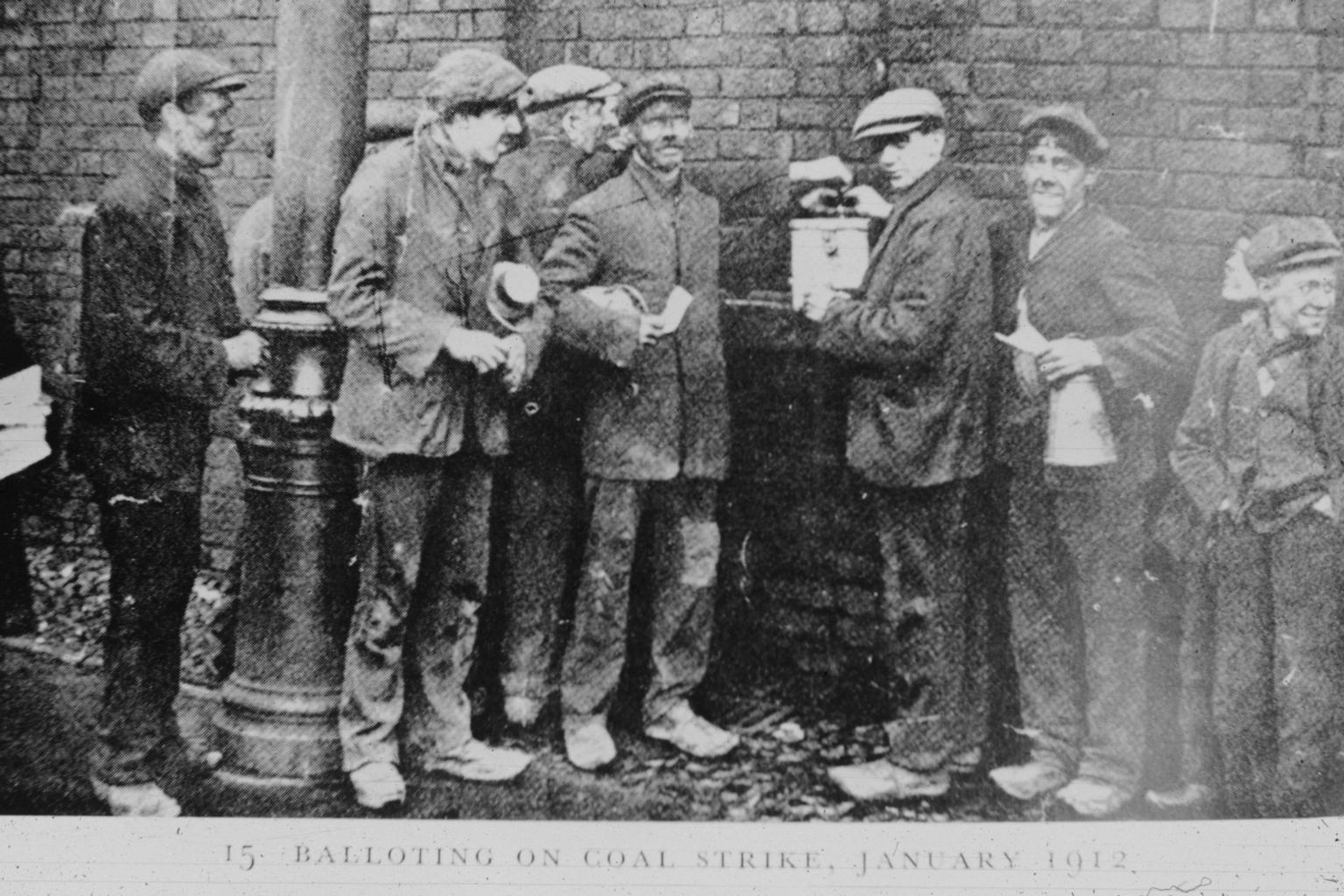
- Miners voting on strike action, January 1912. Image from the CU Boulder Libraries
- Date: 1911–1914
- Location: United Kingdom of Great Britain and Ireland
- Caused by: Poverty, underemployment, and poor working conditions
- Goals: Higher wages and improved working conditions
- Methods: Strike action
- Status: Labour revolt

The Great Unrest, also known as the Great Labour Unrest, was a period of labour revolt between 1911 and 1914 in the United Kingdom. The agitation included the Tonypandy riots, 1911 Liverpool general transport strike, school strikes of 1911, national railway strike of 1911, national coal strike of 1912 and the 1913 Dublin lockout. It was United Kingdom's most significant labour unrest since the Industrial Revolution but is not as widely remembered as the 1926 general strike. The period of unrest was labelled "great" not because of its scale, but due to the level of violence employed by both the state and labourers; including deaths of strikers at the hands of police and sabotage on the part of the workers.

== Background ==
During the late 19th century to the start of the Unrest, there were a series of economic booms, busts and worries. Throughout some of them, prices for consumer goods rose, but wages fell, especially with respect to the share of national income going to labour. French anarchist and syndicalist thought had taken root in Britain over the past three decades and had inspired radicals such as Tom Mann with ideas about the proper course of action for workers. The period leading up to the unrest also was one in which labour laws in Britain were significantly altered by court cases that were not well received by union members. In both cases, they were later either repealed or partially amended by Parliament. The Taff Vale judgement which made unions liable for damage caused by striking until the Trade Disputes Act 1906. The Osborne judgement banned unions from political spending until the Trade Union Act 1913. Additionally, by 1911, a Liberal government had been in power for years and was generally supported by the small Labour Party but had not accomplished enough to satisfy trade unions. Discontent with seeking action through Parliament fuelled extraparliamentary actions such as strikes by syndicalists, socialists and other activist groups.

== Notable events ==
From 1911 to 1914, there were more than 3,000 strikes, with over 1,200 in 1913 alone. The number of working days lost was in the tens of millions, and the percentage of the working population involved in strikes increased more than three times between the first decade of the 20th century and the year 1911. The strikes involved male and female workers, but they were not necessarily in the same unions, and the latter were also influenced by the contemporary women's suffrage movement. The period of the unrest coincided with other social upheavals reshaping Britain, including the Irish Nationalist struggle, the Unionist backlash and the women's suffrage movement. The events led later historians to argue (scholars now tend to agree their conclusions were overstated) that without the outbreak of World War I in 1914, there may have been a massive revolt in Britain.

== Contemporary reactions ==
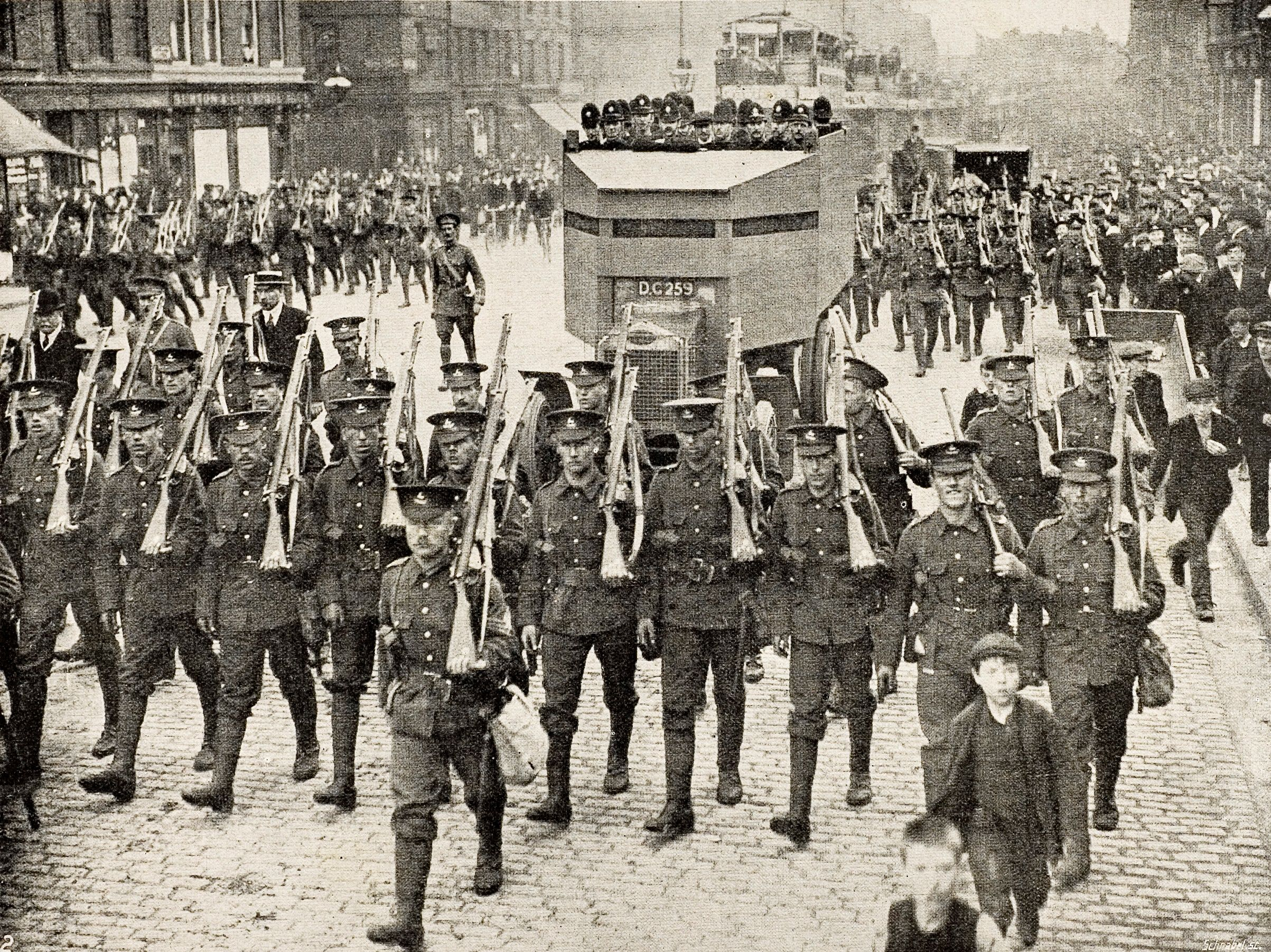
Soldiers escorting a police transport through Liverpool during the National railway strike of 1911

Contemporary reactions ranged from supportive to extremely negative, with papers of record like The Times often arguing for the government to be harder on the strikers, whereas more niche publications like The New Age and New Witness gave some modicum of support to the movement. The last two however tended to couch their support in elitist language and looked down upon the working people, rather than viewing them as equals. Various activist groups and radical movements also published their own papers in which they argued for or against strategic decisions or policies being undertaken.

== Links with other movements ==
=== Women's suffrage movement ===
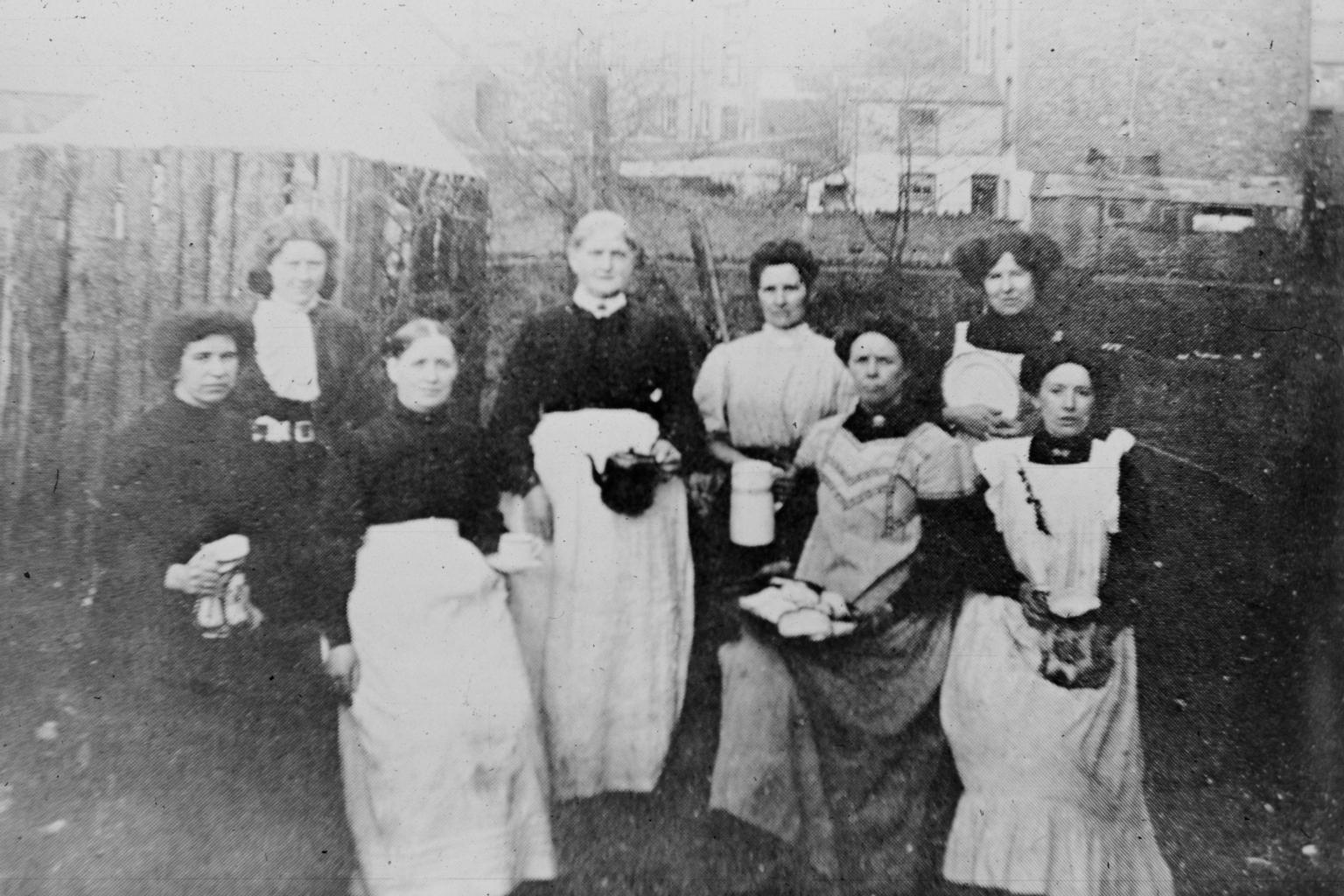
Photograph of women posing during the national coal strike

The labour and women's suffrage movements had a tenuous relationship and often were at odds, but there were instances of collaboration between them. The main issue where they differed was the type of suffrage being fought for. Between 1884 and 1918, approximately two thirds of men met the property requirements for voting. The Women's Suffrage movement, at least initially, tended to argue for instituting equal suffrage but retaining existing property qualifications although militant labour activists wanted full adult suffrage without such barriers. However, some groups of women found that the suffrage movement encouraged their workplace activism. Women strikers were emboldened by the example of militant suffragettes, the latter engaging in actions as extreme as mass window-smashing campaigns and serial arson. The National Federation of Women Workers, although it advocated for adult suffrage, in addition to many other reforms, rather than being a single-cause group, grew by more than 10 times from 1906 to 1914.

=== Syndicalist movement ===
Anarchism, socialism and syndicalism had a significant role in the militant industrial organizing which was the hallmark of the Unrest. From the mid-to-late 19th century, anarchist groups in France and Britain had exchanged ideas, and syndicalist ideology owed a significant debt to anarchist thinkers. Thinkers like Errico Malatesta and Peter Kropotkin were influenced by syndicalism, which found an important supporter in Tom Mann. Inspired by syndicalist ideology, Mann, a socialist and trade union activist, founded the International Syndicalist Education League (ISEL), which brought those ideas to British workers. The British unions took these ideas and applied them to their massive strikes, an example that crossed the English Channel in reverse and inspired French syndicalists, who looked to industrial unions (unions of entire sectors) in Britain as an example. One difference between French and British syndicalists was that the latter were more accommodating towards state power and saw value in the political process. The Social Democratic Federation (SDF) was a mixed supporter of the strikers, but some of its members were more unequivocally for active in the labour struggle.

== See also ==
- Edwardian era, of 1901–1914
- Belgian general strike of 1913
