= Annie Higdon =

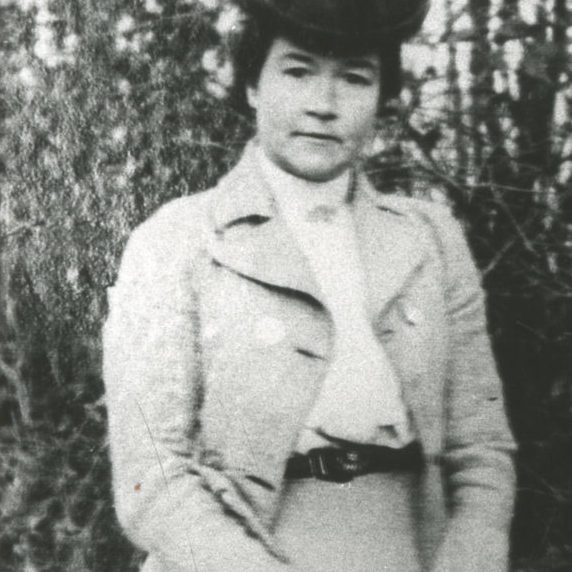
- Annie Schollick in 1896
- Born: Annie Catherine Schollick; 30 December 1864; Wallasey, Cheshire, England
- Died: 24 April 1946 (aged 81); Swainsthorpe, Norfolk, England
- Occupation: Headteacher
- Known for: Burston School Strike
- Spouse: Tom Higdon (m. 1896; died 1939)

Annie Catherine "Kitty" Higdon (née Schollick; 30 December 1864 – 24 April 1946) was a British schoolmistress. She and her husband, Tom, were at the centre of the 25-year long Burston School Strike. Their battle with authority is celebrated annually by a rally that attracts nationally known politicians and trade unionists.

== Life ==
Higdon was born in Poulton-cum-Seacombe, which is now part of Wallasey, in Cheshire. She was born to Samuel and Jane Schollick in 1864. Her father was a shipwright, but she became a qualified elementary teacher. She married Tom Higdon in 1896 and they initially lived in London.

Annie (Kitty) was appointed headmistress in the Norfolk village of Wood Dalling, with Tom as assistant teacher. There they were popular, but they came into conflict with the authorities. Norfolk Education Committee gave the Higdons little choice but to transfer to another school. They moved to the Burston School in 1911. Annie's final comments in the school records were later removed by the education authority as "political and inflammatory".

Arriving at Burston, the Higdons were again popular with all but the authorities. The Reverend Charles Tucker Eland chaired the school's managing body. Eland demanded deference and recognition of his right to lead the community. Their employers, themselves mostly tenants of brewery-owned land, allied with the rector.

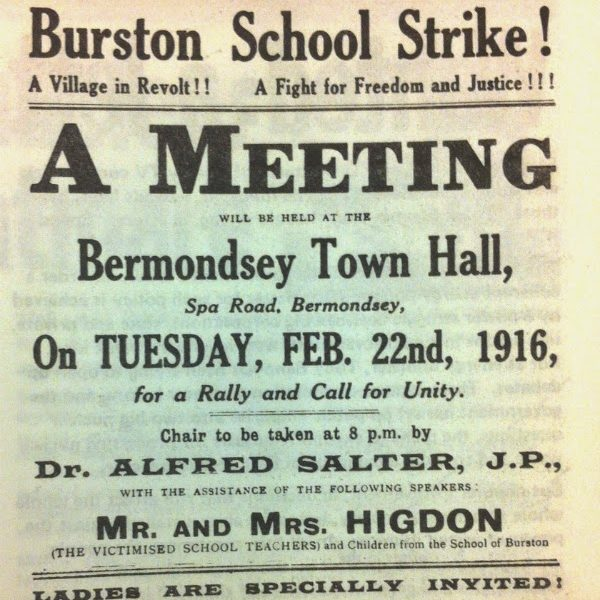
Burston School Strike in 1916

In 1913, Tom Higdon stood for election to the parish council, topping the poll with Eland failing to be elected, but Eland still controlled the school's managing body. The Higdons had complained about children being taken from school for farm work. They also noted the dampness, inadequate heating and lighting, lack of ventilation and generally unhygienic conditions in the school. The managers accused Annie of lighting a fire without their permission. She was also accused of not curtsying to the rector's wife and also of beating two girls. It is now thought that all these accusations were invented or exaggerated.

The Higdons were dismissed in 1914, but the pupils organised a strike. One of the pupils, Violet Potter, led the students out on strike. The vast majority agreed to be taught in temporary places. Initially they worked on the village green and then in a carpenter's shop. The situation attracted national publicity and crowd funding from supporters resulted in a new school building by 1917. Early visitors to the school were Sylvia Pankhurst and George Lansbury, who opened the new building.

The school remained open with eleven pupils until Tom's death in 1939. Annie Higdon died in a retirement home at Swainsthorpe on 24 April 1946. She is buried alongside her husband in Burston churchyard, adjacent to the school building.

== Legacy ==
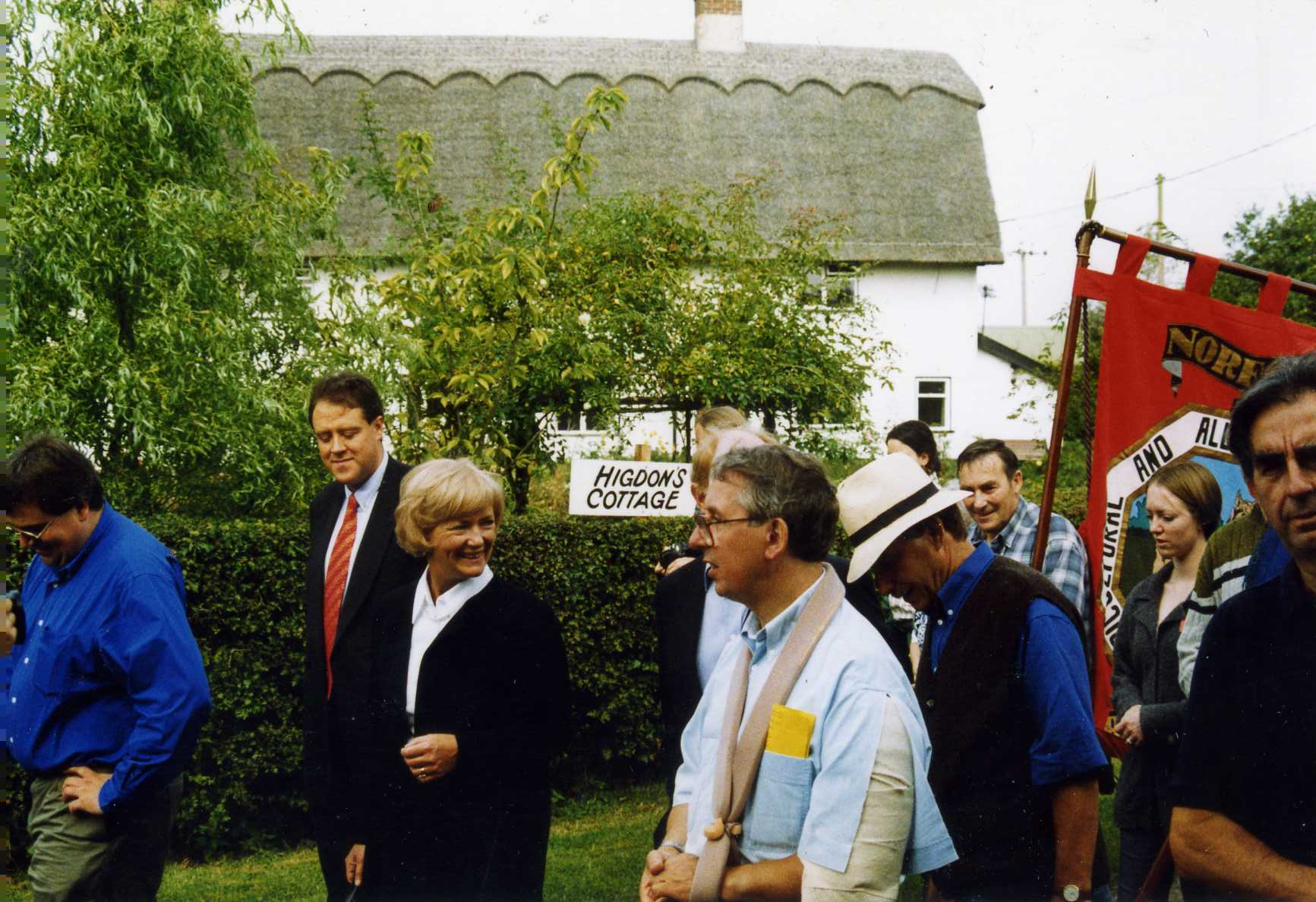
Glenys Kinnock MEP passes Annie Higdon's cottage in Burston

The Higdons' life and strike has featured in films and books. There is an annual rally each September which has attracted leading Labour politicians, including Neil Kinnock, Glenys Kinnock and Jeremy Corbyn.
