= Conduct of Employment Agencies and Employment Businesses (Amendment) Regulations 2022 =

United Kingdom statutory instrument

- Statutory Instrument
- Parliament of the United Kingdom
- Citation: SI 2022/852
- Introduced by: Kwasi Kwarteng, Secretary of State for Business, Energy and Industrial Strategy
- Territorial extent: England, Wales, and Scotland

Dates
- Made: 20 July 2022
- Laid before Parliament: 27 June 2022
- Commencement: 21 July 2022
- Revoked: 10 August 2023

Other legislation
- Amends: Conduct of Employment Agencies and Employment Businesses Regulations 2003

Status: Revoked

Text of the Conduct of Employment Agencies and Employment Businesses (Amendment) Regulations 2022 as in force today (including any amendments) within the United Kingdom, from legislation.gov.uk.

The Conduct of Employment Agencies and Employment Businesses (Amendment) Regulations 2022 (SI 2022/852) is a statutory instrument of the Parliament of the United Kingdom. The regulations removed Regulation 7 of the Conduct of Employment Agencies and Employment Businesses Regulations 2003 (SI 2003/3319), which prevented employment agencies from supplying agency workers to employers to replace workers taking part in official industrial action. The regulations were struck down in a High Court case in July 2023, and were quashed from 10 August 2023.

== Background ==
The prohibition of the use of agency workers to fill the posts of striking workers was first created by the Conduct of Employment Agencies and Employment Businesses Regulations 1976, which were created by the then-Labour government with the powers of the Employment Agencies Act 1973. The 1976 regulations were replaced with new regulations in 2003.

In 2022, the United Kingdom saw the largest instance of rail strikes in the country since 1989, with more than 40,000 RMT members across 14 rail companies going on strike due to disputes over wages, working conditions and job security. The Transport Salaried Staffs' Association (TSSA) and ASLEF also announced strikes, leading to widespread travel disruption.

Unions in other sectors (including the National Education Union, UNISON, the Communication Workers Union, and the Criminal Bar Association) also went on strike, announced ballots for industrial action, or threatened strike action if pay negotiations fell through. Mick Lynch, the RMT's general secretary, called for a general strike.

Grant Shapps, the Secretary of State for Transport, set out the government's plans to limit the impact of the ongoing industrial action in July 2022, including ensuring a 'minimum service level' was maintained throughout strikes. The Conduct of Employment Agencies and Employment Businesses (Amendment) Regulations 2022 were some of the first of such measures.

== Provisions ==
The regulations amend the Conduct of Employment Agencies and Employment Businesses Regulations 2003 to remove Regulation 7. Regulation 7 prohibited employment agencies from offering agency workers to replace striking workers or to replace workers who are moved to cover the duties of striking workers. It only covered official industrial action, meaning that agency workers could have been hired for wildcat strikes.

The regulations were made under the Employment Agencies Act 1973 which meant that the minister responsible is required to consult 'such bodies as appear representative of the interests concerned'. The government was criticised for using a consultation from a similar proposal in 2015 (which was later abandoned) to justify the regulations.

== Passage through parliament ==
The regulations were created and laid before both the House of Commons and the House of Lords on 27 June 2022, and government motions to approve them were tabled the next day.

On 11 July, MPs voted 289 to 202 to approve the instrument, splitting largely along party lines with the Conservatives voting in favour and Labour, the Scottish National Party, Plaid Cymru, Alba and the Green Party voting against. The Liberal Democrats abstained. Only one Conservative MP, Alec Shelbrooke, rebelled to vote against.

In the Lords, the instrument was introduced by Lord Callanan, a Parliamentary Under-Secretary in the Department for Business, Energy and Industrial Strategy. Lord Collins of Highbury moved an amendment to the motion which noted the lack of sufficient required consultation, the opposition from unions, and the potential for the regulations to harm industrial relations and break international law, and condemned the regulations as "simply a political exercise". The amendment was defeated in a 96–80 vote, again mainly along party lines; Lord Balfe was the only Conservative to vote for the amendment.

== Reactions ==
Kwasi Kwarteng said that the regulations would "provide greater flexibility to businesses" and were "good news for our society and our economy". Grant Shapps said that they were "an important milestone" in the government's plan to "minimise the power of union bosses" and that they would mean that future strikes would "cause less disruption". Jane Hunt, the business minister, said that the change was needed to repeal the "outdated blanket ban" on using agency workers.

Keir Starmer, leader of the Labour Party, pledged that a Labour government would reverse the changes. Angela Rayner, the deputy leader of the Labour Party, called the regulations "anti-business and anti-worker". The Scottish Green Party called the change to the law a "disgraceful attack" on trade unions to "distract from [the government's] own catastrophic failings".

The National Law Review reported that there was "almost universal opposition" to the regulations but said that most stakeholders thought that they would have "very little practical effect". The British Medical Association strongly opposed the regulations, saying that the government's proposals were "deeply disappointing". Twelve trade unions (Note: The twelve trade unions were: Unite, USDAW, the BFAWU, the UCU, the RMT, ASLEF, the FDA, the NEU, the PCS, the POA, BALPA, and the GMB.) announced in July 2022 they were preparing to file a High Court challenge against the regulations, alleging that they violate Article 11 of the European Convention on Human Rights and the EU–UK Trade and Cooperation Agreement which committed the UK to implementing basic labour rights. They were later joined by UNISON.

In June 2022, The Financial Times reported that the bosses of thirteen recruiting and staffing companies, including Adecco, Hays, Randstad, and ManpowerGroup, wrote to Kwarteng asking him to rethink the proposals.

== Usage ==
Harrods became the first major employer to threaten to use agency workers under the regulations, after a ballot for strike action was launched by Unite members on 11 August. Unite accused Harrods of trying to union bust and using bullying behaviour to prevent strikes. The company said that although it was not the "preferred course of action", using agency workers would mean that they could "continue to provide the experience that our loyal customers deserve". The Recruitment and Employment Confederation, the trade body for employment agencies, criticised Harrods for putting agency workers "in the middle of the dispute" and said the priority "should always be to negotiate".

In the run-up to the 2023 teacher strikes by the National Education Union, the Department for Education issued guidance to schools to "take all reasonable steps to keep the school open", including by employing agency workers under the regulations to replace striking staff.

During strikes by dustmen in South Gloucestershire, Suez were reported to be employing agency staff. Following the court ruling, Unite said that the situation would worsen once agency workers were not allowed if agreements on pay were not reached.

== High Court case ==
Thirteen trade unions sued the government in the High Court over the regulations: UNISON, Unite, USDAW, the BFAWU, the UCU, the RMT, ASLEF, the FDA, the NEU, the PCS, the POA, BALPA, and the GMB. NASUWT brought its own judicial review case alongside the TUC-coordinated suit. The case, Associated Society of Locomotive Engineers and Firemen and Others v. Secretary of State for Business and Trade, was heard before Mr Justice Linden on 3 and 4 May 2023 and a judgement was handed down on 13 July.

The trade unions challenged the regulations on two grounds: that Kwarteng had failed to adequately consult them as was his duty under section 12(2) of the Employment Agencies Act 1973, and that the regulations breached Kwarteng's duty to prevent unlawful interference in the rights of trade unions under Article 11 of the European Convention on Human Rights. Representatives for the Secretary of State for Business and Trade, Kemi Badenoch, argued that the 2015 consultation had been sufficient to discharge the section 12(2) duty and that the regulations did not constitute an interference with the rights of trade unions.

Linden concluded that the regulations did breach the Secretary of State's duty to consult, saying that the approach was "so unfair as to be unlawful and, indeed, irrational". He found that Kwarteng had not properly taken the responses to the 2015 consultation into account and that even if he had, it would still be unfair to not "seek updated views". Linden quashed the regulations based on solely the first ground and consequently did not rule on the second. The revocation of the regulations came into effect on 10 August 2023, meaning that Regulation 7 came back into force.

=== Responses to decision ===
A spokesperson from the Department of Business and Trade said it was "disappointed" with the decision, that the government was "considering its next steps carefully", and that the right to strike needed to be balanced with the rights of businesses and the general public.

Paul Nowak, the General Secretary of the Trades Union Congress (TUC), stated that the regulations should be "scrapped once and for all", saying that the government should not appeal the ruling. The TUC said the verdict was a "major blow" and a "badge of shame" for the government. Unite said the result was "a total vindication for unions and workers". Mick Whelan, the ASLEF general secretary, said that the union was "proud to have stood with other unions" to challenge the regulations. Patrick Roach, the general secretary of NASUWT, said the regulations had sought to "undermine and weaken" workers' rights and that the government should be "focused on improving the pay and working conditions of all workers" instead. General secretary of the PCS Mark Serwotka hailed the result as "a further litigation victory for PCS" and that the government had "refused to listen". Amy Leversidge, assistant general secretary of the FDA, said the outcome was "a victory for basic fairness and for the trade union movement".

Neil Carberry, the chief executive of the Recruitment and Employment Confederation (REC), said that the decision was "no surprise" and that the "rushed, politically driven process" had not allowed for proper consultation. He called on the government to act quickly to clarify the law to reduce uncertainty for agency workers and businesses.

== Aftermath ==
=== New consultation ===
The Department for Business and Trade launched a new consultation on repealing Regulation 7 on 16 November 2023, maintaining that to do so was "the most appropriate course of action". In a House of Lords debate in December 2023, Lord Offord of Garvel, Parliamentary Under-Secretary of State for Exports, said that the government "continue to believe there is a strong case for removing what is a blanket restriction". The consultation closed on 16 January 2024, but the government did not publicly state when it would reach a decision.

Neil Carberry, the chief executive of the REC, said that the new consultation was a "disappointment" since neither unions or agencies "think this change promotes effective strike resolution or protects agency workers". The TUC opposed any repeal of Regulation 7, saying it represented an "unjustified attempt to undermine the right to strike". Trade unions opposing the proposals included ASLEF, NASUWT, the Royal College of Nursing, the Chartered Society of Physiotherapy, and the Association of School and College Leaders.

=== New Labour government ===
On 22 May 2024, Rishi Sunak called a general election for 4 July, surprising his own party and resulting in much planned legislation being scrapped. Keir Starmer's Labour Party won the election, and had pledged to repeal the regulations and make sure industrial relations policy was focused on "good faith negotiation and bargaining".

== See also ==
- List of statutory instruments of the United Kingdom, 2022
