= List of statutory instruments of the United Kingdom, 2022 =

This is a list of statutory instruments made in the United Kingdom in the year 2022.

== 1–100 ==
Number	Title
1 (W. 1)	The A487 Trunk Road (Llanon, Ceredigion) (Temporary Prohibition of Vehicles) Order 2022
2 (W. 2)	The A470 Trunk Road (Llangurig, Powys to Mallwyd, Gwynedd) (Temporary Speed Restrictions & No Overtaking) Order 2022
3 (W. 3)	The A470 Trunk Road (Builth Wells to Llangurig, Powys) (Temporary Speed Restrictions & No Overtaking) Order 2022
4	The Prison and Young Offender Institution (Coronavirus) (Amendment) Rules 2022
5	The Statutory Sick Pay (Coronavirus) (Funding of Employers’ Liabilities) Regulations 2022
6 (W. 4)	The Renting Homes (Fitness for Human Habitation) (Wales) Regulations 2022
7 (W. 5)	The A458 Trunk Road (East of Middletown to Nant-y-Dugoed, Powys) (Temporary Speed Restrictions & No Overtaking) Order 2022
8	The Personal Protective Equipment at Work (Amendment) Regulations 2022
9	The Statutory Sick Pay (Coronavirus) (Funding of Employers’ Liabilities) (Northern Ireland) Regulations 2022
10	The Occupational Pension Schemes (Charges and Governance) (Amendment) Regulations 2022
11	The Health Protection (Coronavirus, International Travel and Operator Liability) (England) (Amendment) Regulations 2022
12 (W. 6) (C. 1)	The Curriculum and Assessment (Wales) Act 2021 (Commencement No. 2) Order 2022
13 (W. 7)	The County Borough of Wrexham (Electoral Arrangements) (Amendment) Order 2022
14	The Public Lending Right Scheme 1982 (Commencement of Variation) Order 2022
15	The Health and Social Care Act 2008 (Regulated Activities) (Amendment) (Coronavirus) (No. 2) Regulations 2022
16 (W. 8)	The Health Protection (Coronavirus, International Travel and Public Health Information to Travellers) (Wales) (Miscellaneous Amendments) Regulations 2022
17 (W. 9)	The Education (Arrangements for Assessing in the Curriculum for Wales) Regulations 2022
18	The Wills Act 1837 (Electronic Communications) (Amendment) Order 2022
19	The National Health Service (Charges to Overseas Visitors) (Amendment) Regulations 2022
20	The Access to the Countryside (Coastal Margin) (Grain to Woolwich) Order 2022
21	The Private Storage Aid for Pigmeat (England) (Amendment) Regulations 2022
22 (W. 10)	The Renting Homes (Explanatory Information for Written Statements of Occupation Contracts) (Wales) Regulations 2022
23 (W. 11)	The Renting Homes (Supplementary Provisions) (Wales) Regulations 2022
24 (W. 12)	The Renting Homes (Supported Standard Contracts) (Supplementary Provisions) (Wales) Regulations 2022
25	The Council Tax Reduction Schemes (Prescribed Requirements) (England) (Amendment) Regulations 2022
26	The Elections (Policy Development Grants Scheme) (Amendment) Order 2022
27	The School and Early Years Finance (England) Regulations 2022
28 (W. 13)	The Renting Homes (Model Written Statements of Contract) (Wales) Regulations 2022
29	The Ammonium Nitrate Materials (High Nitrogen Content) Safety (Amendment) Regulations 2022
30	The Occupational and Personal Pension Schemes (Disclosure of Information) (Requirements to Refer Members to Guidance etc.) (Amendment) Regulations 2022
31	The Companies (Strategic Report) (Climate-related Financial Disclosure) Regulations 2022
32	The Whole of Government Accounts (Designation of Bodies) Order 2022
33	The Protection of Animals at the Time of Killing (Amendment) (England) Regulations 2022
34	The Consumer Scotland Act 2020 (Consequential Provisions and Modifications) Order 2022
35 (W. 14)	The A470 Trunk Road (Powys/Merthyr Tydfil County Boundary to Builth Wells, Powys) (Temporary Speed Restrictions & No Overtaking) Order 2022
36 (W. 15)	The A44 Trunk Road (Llangurig, Powys to Aberystwyth, Ceredigion) (Temporary Speed Restrictions & No Overtaking) Order 2022
37	The London Borough of Lambeth (Electoral Changes) Order 2022
38	The South Cambridgeshire (Electoral Changes) Order 2022
39 (W. 16)	The Health Protection (Coronavirus Restrictions) (No. 5) (Wales) (Amendment) Regulations 2022
40 (W. 17)	The A489 Trunk Road (Newtown to Caersws, Powys) (Temporary Speed Restrictions & No Overtaking) Order 2022
41	The Merchant Shipping (High Speed Offshore Service Craft) Regulations 2022
42	The Air Navigation (Restriction of Flying) (Helicopter Flight) Regulations 2022
43	The Air Navigation (Restriction of Flying) (Manchester) (Emergency) Regulations 2022
44 (L. 1)	The Family Procedure (Amendment) Rules 2022
45 (L. 2)	The Criminal Procedure (Amendment) Rules 2022
46	The Limited Liability Partnerships (Climate-related Financial Disclosure) Regulations 2022
47	The Representation of the People (Amendment) (Northern Ireland) (EU Exit) Regulations 2022
48 (C. 2)	The Environment Act 2021 (Commencement No. 2 and Saving Provision) Regulations 2022
49 (W. 18)	The Education (Eligibility for Student Support) (Amendment) (Wales) Regulations 2022
50	The Air Navigation (Restriction of Flying) (Manchester) (Emergency) (Revocation) Regulations 2022
51 (W. 19)	The Council Tax Reduction Schemes (Prescribed Requirements and Default Scheme) (Wales) (Amendment) Regulations 2022
52 (W. 20)	The Non-Domestic Rating (Multiplier) (Wales) Regulations 2022
53	Not Allocated
54 (L. 3)	The Family Proceedings Fees (Amendment) Order 2022
55 (W. 21)	The Health Protection (Coronavirus Restrictions) (No. 5) (Wales) (Amendment) (No. 2) Regulations 2022
56	The Air Navigation (Restriction of Flying) (Helicopter Flight) (Amendment) Regulations 2022
57	The Education (Student Fees, Awards and Support) (Amendment) Regulations 2022
58 (W. 22)	The Government of Wales Act 2006 (Budget Motions and Designated Bodies) (Amendment) Order 2022
59	The Road Vehicles (Construction and Use) (Amendment) Regulations 2022
60	The Universal Credit and Employment and Support Allowance (Claimant Commitment Exceptions) (Amendment) Regulations 2022
61 (W. 23)	The Education (School Day and School Year) (Wales) (Amendment and Revocation) Regulations 2022
62	The Carbon Accounting (Provision for 2020) Regulations 2022
63 (W. 24)	The M4 Motorway (Junction 23a (Magor), Monmouthshire to Junction 34 (Miskin), Rhondda Cynon Taf) & the A48(M) Motorway (Junction 29 (Castleton), Newport to Junction 29A (St Mellons), Cardiff) (Temporary Prohibition of Vehicles) Order 2022
64	The Air Navigation (Restriction of Flying) (Stoke on Trent) (Emergency) Regulations 2022
65	The Afghanistan (Sanctions) (EU Exit) (Amendment) Regulations 2022
66 (C. 3)	The Traffic Management Act 2004 (Commencement No. 10 and Savings and Transitional Provisions) (England) Order 2022
67 (W. 25)	The A4060 Trunk Road (Leo's Roundabout to Mountain Hare Roundabout, Merthyr Tydfil) (Temporary Prohibition of Vehicles and Speed Restrictions) Order 2022
68	The Air Navigation (Restriction of Flying) (Stoke on Trent) (Emergency) (Revocation) Regulations 2022
69	The Local Audit (Appointing Person) (Amendment) Regulations 2022
70 (W. 26)	The Sea Fishing Operations (Monitoring Devices) (Wales) Order 2022
71	The Civil Enforcement of Road Traffic Contraventions (Approved Devices, Charging Guidelines and General Provisions) (England) Regulations 2022
72	The Health Protection (Coronavirus, Restrictions) (Self-Isolation) (England) (Amendment) Regulations 2022
73 (C. 4)	The Domestic Abuse Act 2021 (Commencement No. 3) Regulations 2022
74	The Civil Partnership (Scotland) Act 2020 and Marriage and Civil Partnership (Scotland) Act 2014 (Consequential Modifications) Order 2022
75 (W. 27)	The Health Protection (Coronavirus Restrictions) (No. 5) (Wales) (Amendment) (No. 3) Regulations 2022
76	The Data Protection Act 2018 (Amendment of Schedule 2 Exemptions) Regulations 2022
77	The Civil Jurisdiction and Judgments (2005 Hague Convention and 2007 Hague Convention) (Amendment) Regulations 2022
78	The Asylum Support (Amendment) Regulations 2022
79 (W. 28)	The Education (Student Finance) (Miscellaneous Amendments) (Wales) Regulations 2022
80	The Birmingham Commonwealth Games (Concurrent Exercise of Traffic Management Powers) Regulations 2022
81	The Road Vehicles (Construction and Use) (Amendment) (No. 2) Regulations 2022
82	The European Qualifications (Health and Social Care Professions) (Amendment etc.) (EU Exit) Regulations 2022
83 (W. 29)	The Health Protection (Coronavirus Restrictions) (No. 5) (Wales) (Amendment) (No. 4) Regulations 2022
84	The Immigration and Police (Passenger, Crew and Service Information) (Amendment) Order 2022
85	The Train Driving Licences and Certificates (Amendment) Regulations 2022
86	The Apprenticeships (Miscellaneous Provisions) (Amendment) (England) Regulations 2022
87	The Air Traffic Management and Unmanned Aircraft Act 2021 (Airspace Change Directions) (Determination of Turnover for Penalties) Regulations 2022
88	The Pension Protection Fund and Occupational Pension Schemes (Levy Ceiling) Order 2022
89 (W. 30)	The National Health Service (Charges to Overseas Visitors) (Amendment) (Wales) Regulations 2022
90	The Medicines and Healthcare Products Regulatory Agency Trading Fund (Revocation) Order 2022
91	Not Allocated
92 (W. 32)	The A483 Trunk Road (Powys/Carmarthenshire County Boundary to Llanymynech, Powys) (Temporary Speed Restrictions & No Overtaking) Order 2022
93 (C. 5)	The Ivory Act 2018 (Commencement No. 1) Regulations 2022
94	The Ivory Prohibitions (Exemptions) (Process and Procedure) Regulations 2022
95	The Flags (Northern Ireland) (Amendment) Regulations 2022
96	The Merchant Shipping and Fishing Vessels (Entry into Enclosed Spaces) Regulations 2022
97 (W. 33)	The B5125 (Chester Road), (Broughton, Flintshire) (40 mph Speed Limit) Order 2022
98 (C. 6) (W. 34)	The Local Government and Elections (Wales) Act 2021 (Commencement No. 5 and Transitional Provision) Order 2022
99 (W. 35)	The Care and Support (Charging) and (Financial Assessment) (Wales) (Miscellaneous Amendments) Regulations 2022
100	The Financial Services and Markets Act 2000 (Exemption) (Amendment) Order 2022

== 101–200 ==
Number	Title
101 (L. 4)	The Civil Procedure (Amendment) Rules 2022
102	The Stamp Duty and Stamp Duty Reserve Tax (LCH SA) Regulations 2022
103 (W. 36)	The A40 Trunk Road (Gibraltar Tunnels, Monmouth, Monmouthshire) (Temporary Traffic Prohibitions & Restrictions) Order 2022
104	The Air Navigation (Restriction of Flying) (Helicopter Flight) (Amendment) (No. 2) Regulations 2022
105	The School Admissions (Admission Arrangements and Co-ordination of Admission Arrangements) (England) (Amendment) Regulations 2022
106 (W. 37)	The National Health Service (Performers Lists) (Wales) (Amendment) (EU Exit) Regulations 2022
107 (W. 38)	The Council Tax (Administration and Enforcement) (Amendment) (Wales) Regulations 2022
108	The Universal Credit and Jobseeker's Allowance (Work Search and Work Availability Requirements – limitations) (Amendment) Regulations 2022
109	The Customs (Amendment) (EU Exit) Regulations 2022
110	The Motor Vehicles (Driving Licences) (Amendment) Regulations 2022
111 (W. 39)	The Curriculum and Assessment (Wales) Act 2021 (Transitional and Saving Provision) Regulations 2022
112 (W. 40)	The Food (Withdrawal of Recognition) (Miscellaneous Amendments and Transitional Provisions) (Wales) (EU Exit) Regulations 2022
113	The Trade Remedies (Review and Reconsideration of Transitioned Trade Remedies) Regulations 2022
114	The Phytosanitary Conditions (Amendment) Regulations 2022
115	The Offshore Installations (Safety Zones) Order 2022
116	The Access to the Countryside (Coastal Margin) (Silecroft to Silverdale No. 1) Order 2022
117	The Plastic Packaging Tax (General) Regulations 2022
118	The Safeguarding (Code of Practice) Measure 2021 (Commencement and Transitional Provision) Order 2022
119 (C. 7)	The Air Traffic Management and Unmanned Aircraft Act 2021 (Commencement No. 2) Regulations 2022
120	The Transport Act 2000 (Air Traffic Services Licence Modification Appeals) (Prescribed Aerodromes) Regulations 2022
121	The Microchipping of Dogs (England) (Amendment) Regulations 2022
122	The Safety of Sports Grounds (Designation) (Amendment) (England) Order 2022
123	The Russia (Sanctions) (EU Exit) (Amendment) Regulations 2022
124	The Competition Act 1998 (Health Services for Patients in England) (Coronavirus) (Public Policy Exclusion) Order 2022
125	The Health Protection (Coronavirus, International Travel and Operator Liability) (England) (Amendment) (No. 2) Regulations 2022
126 (W. 41)	The Health Protection (Coronavirus, International Travel) (Wales) Regulations 2022 (revoked)
127	The Council Tax (Demand Notices and Reduction Schemes) (England) (Amendment) Regulations 2022
128	The Air Navigation (Restriction of Flying) (Aintree) Regulations 2022
129	The Gosport (Electoral Changes) Order 2022
130	Not Allocated
131	The Bury (Electoral Changes) Order 2022
132 (W. 42)	The Milk and Milk Products (Pupils in Educational Establishments) Aid Applications (Wales) Regulations 2022
133 (W. 43)	The A483 Trunk Road (Ffairfach to Llandeilo Roundabout, Carmarthenshire) (Temporary Prohibition of Vehicles and 10 mph Speed Limit) Order 2022
134	The Air Navigation (Restriction of Flying) (Cheltenham) Regulations 2022
135	The Air Navigation (Restriction of Flying) (Royal Air Force Waddington) Regulations 2022
136	The Air Navigation (Restriction of Flying) (Old Warden) Regulations 2022
137	The Money Laundering and Terrorist Financing (Amendment) Regulations 2022
138	The Norfolk Vanguard Offshore Wind Farm Order 2022
139	The Universal Credit (Work-Related Requirements) In Work Pilot Scheme (Extension) Order 2022
140 (W. 44)	The South East Wales Corporate Joint Committee (Amendment) Regulations 2022
141	The Countryside Stewardship (England) (Amendment) Regulations 2022
142 (W. 45)	The Health Protection (Coronavirus Restrictions) (No. 5) (Wales) (Amendment) (No. 5) Regulations 2022
143 (W. 46)	The Renting Homes (Wales) Act 2016 (Amendment of Schedule 9A) Regulations 2022
144	The Pesticides (Revocation) (EU Exit) Regulations 2022
145	The Inspectors of Education, Children's Services and Skills Order 2022
146	The International Organization for Marine Aids to Navigation (Legal Capacities) Order 2022
147	The Naval, Military and Air Forces Etc. (Disablement and Death) Service Pensions (Amendment) Order 2022
148	Not Allocated
149 (W. 47)	The Plant Health etc. (Fees) (Amendment) (Wales) (EU Exit) Regulations 2022
150 (W. 48)	The Health Protection (Coronavirus, Public Health Information to Travellers and Operator Liability) (Wales) (Amendment) Regulations 2022 (revoked)
151 (W. 49)	The A487 Trunk Road (Caernarfon and Bontnewydd Bypass, Gwynedd) (40 mph Speed Limit, Derestriction and Prohibition of Overtaking) Order 2022
152 (W. 50)	The A4232 Trunk Road (Capel Llanilltern to Culverhouse Cross, Cardiff) (Temporary Prohibition of Vehicles) Order 2022
153 (W. 51)	The A487 Trunk Road (Caernarfon and Bontnewydd Bypass and Y Felinheli Bypass, Gwynedd) (Clearway) Order 2022
154	The Jobseeker's Allowance (Schemes for Assisting Persons to Obtain Employment) (Amendment) Regulations 2022
155	The Faculty Jurisdiction (Amendment) Rules 2022
156	The Competition Appeal Tribunal (Recording and Broadcasting) Order 2022
157	The Thurrock Flexible Generation Plant Development Consent Order 2022
158	The Occupational Pension Schemes (Schemes that were Contracted-out) (No. 2) (Amendment) Regulations 2022
159	The Domestic Renewable Heat Incentive Scheme and Renewable Heat Incentive Scheme (Amendment) Regulations 2022
160	The Milk and Milk Products (Pupils in Educational Establishments) Aid Applications (England and Scotland) Regulations 2022
161	The Health Protection (Coronavirus, Restrictions) (Self-Isolation etc.) (Revocation) (England) Regulations 2022
162	Not Allocated
163 (C. 8)	The Financial Services Act 2021 (Commencement No. 4) Regulations 2022
164 (W. 52)	The A487 Trunk Road (Tre Taliesin, Ceredigion) (Temporary Prohibition of Vehicles) Order 2022
165 (W. 53)	The A470 Trunk Road (Llanrwst, Conwy County Borough) (Temporary Prohibition of Vehicles & Cyclists) Order 2022
166	The Personal Injuries (NHS Charges) (Amounts) (Amendment) Regulations 2022
167 (W. 54)	The A487 Trunk Road (Pembrokeshire/Ceredigion County Boundary near Cardigan, Ceredigion to the Powys/Gwynedd County Boundary at Dyfi Bridge, Powys) (Temporary Speed Restrictions & No Overtaking) Order 2022
168	The Health Protection (Coronavirus, International Travel and Operator Liability) (England) (Amendment) (No. 3) Regulations 2022
169	The Income Tax (Qualifying Maintenance Payments) (Amendment) Regulations 2022
170 (W. 55)	The A55 Trunk Road (Junction 35 (Dobshill) to Junction 36 (The Warren), Flintshire) (Temporary Traffic Prohibitions and Restrictions) Order 2022
171 (W. 56)	The A40 Trunk Road (Glangrwyney to Pont Wen, Halfway, Powys) (Temporary Speed Restrictions & No Overtaking) Order 2022
172	The Air Navigation (Isle of Man) (Amendment) Order 2022
173 (W. 57)	The A479 Trunk Road (Glanusk Park to Llyswen, Powys) (Temporary Speed Restrictions & No Overtaking) Order 2022
174	The Customs Tariff (Preferential Trade and Tariff Quotas) (EU Exit) (Amendment) Regulations 2022
175	The Representation of the People (Proxy Vote Applications) (Coronavirus) (Amendment) Regulations 2022
176	The Statutory Sick Pay (Coronavirus) (Miscellaneous Amendments) Regulations 2022
177	The Social Security (Disability Assistance for Working Age People) (Consequential Amendments) Order 2022
178 (W. 58)	The Relaxation of School Reporting Requirements (Wales) (Coronavirus) Regulations 2022
179	The Health and Social Care Act 2008 (Regulated Activities) (Amendment) Regulations 2022
180 (W. 59)	The Health Protection (Coronavirus Restrictions) (No. 5) (Wales) (Amendment) (No. 6) Regulations 2022
181 (W. 60)	The A55 Trunk Road (Penmaenbach Headland, Conwy) (Temporary Traffic Prohibitions & Restrictions) Order 2022
182	The Employment Rights (Increase of Limits) Order 2022
183	The Air Navigation (Restriction of Flying) (Russian Aircraft) Regulations 2022
184	The Designation of Freeport Tax Sites (East Midlands Freeport) Regulations 2022
185	The Designation of Freeport Tax Sites (Liverpool City Region Freeport) Regulations 2022
186	The Designation of Freeport Tax Sites (Solent Freeport) Regulations 2022
187 (W. 61)	The A5 Trunk Road (Holyhead Road Roundabout, Bangor, Gwynedd to Mona Road Roundabout, Menai Bridge, Anglesey) (Temporary Prohibition of Vehicles, Cyclists & Pedestrians) Order 2022
188 (W. 62)	The Corporate Joint Committees (Transport Functions) (Consequential Modifications and Transitional Provisions) (Wales) Regulations 2022
189	The Non-Domestic Rating (Levy and Safety Net) (Amendment) Regulations 2022
190	The Waste and Agriculture (Legislative Functions) Regulations 2022
191	The Polygraph (Amendment) Rules 2022
192	The Air Navigation (Restriction of Flying) (Russian Aircraft) (Amendment) Regulations 2022
193 (W. 63)	The A487 Trunk Road (Great Darkgate Street and Owain Glyndwr Square, Aberystwyth, Ceredigion) (Temporary Traffic Prohibitions) Order 2022
194	The Russia (Sanctions) (EU Exit) (Amendment) (No. 2) Regulations 2022
195	The Russia (Sanctions) (EU Exit) (Amendment) (No. 3) Regulations 2022
196	Her Majesty's Chief Inspector of Education, Children's Services and Skills (Fees and Frequency of Inspections) (Children's Homes etc.) (Amendment) Regulations 2022
197	The Houses in Multiple Occupation (Specified Educational Establishments) (England) (Amendment) Regulations 2022
198	The Housing (Approval of Code of Management Practice) (Student Accommodation) (England) Order 2022
199 (W. 64)	The A470 Trunk Road (Rhayader, Powys) (Temporary Prohibition of Vehicles, Cyclists & Equestrians) Order 2022
200	The Direct Payments to Farmers (Allocation of Payment Entitlements from the National Reserve) (England) Regulations 2022

== 201–300 ==
Number	Title
201	Not Allocated
202	The M271 Motorway (Junction 1 to Redbridge Roundabout) (Fixed Speed Limits) (Amendment) Regulations 2022
203	The Russia (Sanctions) (EU Exit) (Amendment) (No. 4) Regulations 2022
204	The Oil and Gas Authority (Levy and Fees) Regulations 2022
205	The Russia (Sanctions) (EU Exit) (Amendment) (No. 5) Regulations 2022
206	The Health and Social Care Act 2008 (Regulated Activities) (Amendment) (Coronavirus) (No. 3) Regulations 2022
207 (W. 65)	The A470 Trunk Road (Hay Road, Builth Wells, Powys) (40 mph Speed Limit) Order 2022
208 (C. 9) (W. 66)	The Health and Social Care (Quality and Engagement) (Wales) Act 2020 (Commencement No. 1) Order 2022
209 (W. 67)	The Eggs (Wales) Regulations 2022
210 (W. 68)	The Council Tax (Joint and Several Liability of Care Leavers) (Wales) Regulations 2022
211	The Air Traffic Management (Regulation (EU) No 716/2014) (Amendment) Regulations 2022
212	The Air Navigation (Restriction of Flying) (Air Races) Regulations 2022
213 (W. 69)	The Menai Strait (East) Mussel and Oyster Fishery Order 2022
214	The Social Security (Industrial Injuries) (Prescribed Diseases) Amendment Regulations 2022
215	The Public Service Pensions Revaluation Order 2022
216	The Social Security Revaluation of Earnings Factors Order 2022
217	The Non-Domestic Rating (Definition of Domestic Property) (England) Order 2022
218	The Cremation (England and Wales) (Amendment) Regulations 2022
219	The Air Navigation (Restriction of Flying) (Blackpool) Regulations 2022
220 (W. 70)	The Local Election Survey (Wales) (Amendment) Regulations 2022
221	The National Health Service (Optical Charges and Payments) (Amendment) Regulations 2022
222	The M48 Motorway (Severn Bridge Weight) (Temporary Restriction of Traffic) Order 2022
223 (W. 71) (C. 10)	The Environment Act 2021 (Commencement No. 1 and Saving Provision) (Wales) Regulations 2022
224	The Finance Act 2021, Schedule 33 (Licensing Authorities: Tax Information) Regulations 2022
225	The Air Navigation (Restriction of Flying) (Loch Long and the Firth of Clyde) Regulations 2022
226	The Value Added Tax (Enforcement Related to Distance Selling and Miscellaneous Amendments) Regulations 2022
227	The Income Tax (Pay As You Earn) and the Income Tax (Construction Industry Scheme) (Amendment) Regulations 2022
228	The Saint Mawes Pier and Harbour Revision Order 2022
229	The Social Security (Industrial Injuries) (Prescribed Diseases) Amendment (No. 2) Regulations 2022
230	The Taxation of Chargeable Gains Act 1992 (Amendment) Regulations 2022
231	The Tax Credits, Child Benefit and Guardian's Allowance Up-rating Regulations 2022
232	The Social Security (Contributions) (Rates, Limits and Thresholds Amendments and National Insurance Funds Payments) Regulations 2022
233	The Immigration and Nationality (Fees) (Amendment) Order 2022
234	The Hydrocarbon Oil Duties (Consequential Amendments and Transitional Provisions) Regulations 2022
235	The Immigration and Asylum Act 1999 (Part 5 Exemption: Licensed Sponsors) Order 2022
236	The Guardian's Allowance Up-rating Regulations 2022
237	The Divorce, Dissolution and Separation Act 2020 (Consequential Amendments) Regulations 2022
238	The Hydrocarbon Oil Duties (Miscellaneous Amendments) Regulations 2022
239	The Disregard and Bringing into Account of Profit and Losses on Derivative Contracts Hedging Acquisitions and Disposals of Shares Regulations 2022
240	The Merchant Shipping (Light Dues) (Amendment) Regulations 2022
241	The Russia (Sanctions) (EU Exit) (Amendment) (No. 6) Regulations 2022
242	The Immigration (Restrictions on Employment and Residential Accommodation) (Prescribed Requirements and Codes of Practice) and Licensing Act 2003 (Personal and Premises Licences) (Forms), etc., Regulations 2022
243	The Care and Support (Charging and Assessment of Resources) (Amendment) Regulations 2022
244 (W. 72)	The Renting Homes (Prescribed Forms) (Wales) Regulations 2022
245 (W. 73)	The Renting Homes (Review of Decisions) (Wales) Regulations 2022
246	The Certification Officer (Amendment of Fees) Regulations 2022
247	The Government Resources and Accounts Act 2000 (Estimates and Accounts) Order 2022
248 (W. 74)	The County Borough of the Vale of Glamorgan (Electoral Arrangements) (Amendment) Order 2022
249	Not Allocated
250 (W. 76)	The Renting Homes (Deposit Schemes) (Required Information) (Wales) Regulations 2022
251 (W. 77)	The National Health Service Trusts (Membership and Procedure) (Amendment) (Wales) Regulations 2022
252	The Trade Union (Levy Payable to the Certification Officer) Regulations 2022
253	The Mesothelioma Lump Sum Payments (Conditions and Amounts) (Amendment) Regulations 2022
254	The Pneumoconiosis etc. (Workers’ Compensation) (Payment of Claims) (Amendment) Regulations 2022
255	The Occupational Pension Schemes (Collective Money Purchase Schemes) Regulations 2022
256 (W. 78)	The Renting Homes (Safeguarding Property in Abandoned Dwellings) (Wales) Regulations 2022
257	The Universal Credit (Energy Rebate Scheme Disregard) Regulations 2022
258	The Air Navigation (Restriction of Flying) (Farnborough) Regulations 2022
259	The Occupational Pension Schemes (Fraud Compensation Levy) (Amendment) Regulations 2022
260	The Universal Credit and Employment and Support Allowance (Terminal Illness) (Amendment) Regulations 2022
261 (S. 1)	The Forensic Medical Services (Victims of Sexual Offences) (Scotland) Act 2021 (Consequential Modifications) Order 2022
262	The Passenger, Crew and Service Information (Civil Penalties) (Amendment) Regulations 2022
263 (W. 79)	The Local Elections (Miscellaneous and Consequential Amendments) (Wales) Regulations 2022
264	The Trade Union (Power of the Certification Officer to Impose Financial Penalties) Regulations 2022
265	The Excise Duties (Northern Ireland etc. Miscellaneous Modifications and Amendments) (EU Exit) Regulations 2022
266	The Residential Property Developer Tax (Allocation of Allowance) Regulations 2022
267	The Armed Forces and Reserve Forces (Compensation Scheme) (Amendment) Order 2022
268	The Bedford (Electoral Changes) Order 2022
269	The Economic Crime (Anti-Money Laundering) Levy Regulations 2022
270	Not Allocated
271	The Customs (Import and Export Declarations) (Amendment) Regulations 2022
272	The Coroners and Justice Act 2009 (Alteration of Coroner Areas) Order 2022
273	The National Health Service Pension Schemes (Member Contributions etc.) (Amendment) Regulations 2022
274	The Recovery of Costs (Remand to Youth Detention Accommodation) (Amendment) Regulations 2022
275	The Finance Act 2021 (Modification of Section 26) (Coronavirus) Regulations 2022
276	The Social Security Contributions (Disregarded Payments) (Coronavirus) Regulations 2022
277	The Occupational Pension Schemes (Master Trusts) (Amendment) Regulations 2022
278	The Town and Country Planning (General Permitted Development) (England) (Amendment) Order 2022
279 (W. 80)	The Monmouthshire (Communities) Order 2022
280 (W. 81)	The Avian Influenza (Wales) (Amendment and Revocation) Order 2022
281	The Air Navigation (Restriction of Flying) (Loch Long and the Firth of Clyde) (Amendment) Regulations 2022
282	The Air Navigation (Restriction of Flying) (London Luton Airport) Regulations 2022
283 (C. 11)	The Divorce, Dissolution and Separation Act 2020 (Commencement) Regulations 2022
284	The Mandatory Travel Concession (England) (Amendment) Regulations 2022
285	Not Allocated
286	The Taxation of Banks (Amendments to the Corporation Tax Act 2009, Corporation Tax Act 2010 and Finance Act 2011) Regulations 2022
287	The M42 Motorway (Junction 8 to Junction 7) and M6 Toll Motorway (M6 Toll Junction T2 to M42 Junction 8) (Temporary Prohibition of Traffic) Order 2022
288	The Ivory Act 2018 (Commencement No. 2 and Transitional Provision) Regulations 2022
289	The Police Act 1997 (Criminal Records and Registration) (Guernsey) (Amendment) Regulations 2022
290	The Police Act 1997 (Criminal Records and Registration) (Isle of Man) (Amendment) Regulations 2022
291	The Police Act 1997 (Criminal Records and Registration) (Jersey) (Amendment) Regulations 2022
292	The Social Security Benefits Up-rating Order 2022
293	The Goods Vehicles (Licensing of Operators) (Amendment) Regulations 2022
294	The Personal Injuries (Civilians) Scheme (Amendment) Order 2022
295	The Marriages and Civil Partnerships (Approved Premises) (Amendment) Regulations 2022
296	The Immigration and Nationality and Immigration Services Commissioner (Fees) (Amendment) Regulations 2022
297	The Guaranteed Minimum Pensions Increase Order 2022
298	The Social Security (Medical Evidence) and Statutory Sick Pay (Medical Evidence) (Amendment) Regulations 2022
299	The Bridgwater Tidal Barrier Order 2022
300	The Social Security (Contributions) (Amendment) Regulations 2022

== 301–400 ==
Number	Title
301	The Education (Student Loans) (Repayment) (Amendment) Regulations 2022
302 (C. 12)	The Welfare Reform Act 2012 (Commencement No. 34 and Commencement No. 9, 21, 23, 31 and 32 and Transitional and Transitory Provisions (Amendment)) Order 2022
303	The Police Act 1997 (Criminal Records) (Amendment) Regulations 2022
304	The Diocese of Bath and Wells (Educational Endowments) (Binegar School) Order 2022
305	The Diocese of Lincoln (Educational Endowments) (Saltfleetby Church of England Primary School) Order 2022
306	The Social Security (Contributions) (Re-rating) Consequential Amendment Regulations 2022
307	The National Insurance Contributions Act 2022 (Application of Part 1) Regulations 2022
308	The Cathedrals Measure 2021 (Saving Provision) Order 2022
309	The Diocese of Lincoln (Educational Endowments) (Barton on Humber Church of England Primary School) Order 2022
310	The Diocese of Canterbury (Educational Endowments) (St. Saviour's Church of England Junior School) Order 2022
311	The Ivory Prohibition (Civil Sanctions) Regulations 2022
312 (L. 5)	The Tribunal Procedure (Amendment) Rules 2022
313	The Social Security Contributions (Freeports) Regulations 2022
314 (W. 82)	The County Borough of Caerphilly (Electoral Arrangements) (Amendment) Order 2022
315 (W. 83)	The Health Protection (Coronavirus, International Travel, Operator Liability and Public Health Information to Travellers etc.) (Wales) (Revocation) Regulations 2022
316	The National Health Service (Clinical Commissioning Groups) (Amendment) Regulations 2022
317	The Health Protection (Coronavirus, International Travel and Operator Liability) (Revocation) (England) Regulations 2022
318	The National Health Service (Charges to Overseas Visitors) (Amendment) (No. 2) Regulations 2022
319	The Judicial Pensions Regulations 2022
320	The Teachers’ Pension Scheme (Amendment) Regulations 2022
321	The Air Navigation (Amendment) Order 2022
322	The Misuse of Drugs Act 1971 (Amendment) Order 2022
323	The Armed Forces Pensions (Amendment) Regulations 2022
324	The Air Navigation (Isle of Man) (Amendment) (No. 2) Order 2022
325	The River Tyne (Tunnels) (Revision of Toll) Order 2022
326	The Education (Inspectors of Education and Training in Wales) Order 2022
327	The National Health Service Pension Schemes (Amendment) Regulations 2022
328	The North Yorkshire (Structural Changes) Order 2022
329	The Somerset (Structural Changes) Order 2022
330	The Public Service (Civil Servants and Others) Pensions (Amendment) Regulations 2022
331	The Cumbria (Structural Changes) Order 2022
332	The Social Security (Scotland) Act 2018 (Disability Assistance and Information-Sharing) (Consequential Provision and Modifications) Order 2022
333	The Pensions Increase (Review) Order 2022
334	The Civil Service (Other Crown Servants) Pension Scheme (Amendment) Regulations 2022
335	The Scotland Act 2016 (Social Security) (Adult Disability Payment and Child Disability Payment) (Amendment) Regulations 2022
336	The Police and Firefighters’ Pension Schemes (Amendment) Regulations 2022
337	The Occupational Pension Schemes (Collective Money Purchase Schemes) (Modifications and Consequential and Miscellaneous Amendments) Regulations 2022
338 (W. 84)	The A4042 Trunk Road (Pontypool Roundabout, Torfaen to Little Mill Junction, Monmouthshire) (Temporary Prohibition of Vehicles and Cyclists) Order 2022
339	The Allocation of Housing and Homelessness (Eligibility) (England) and Persons subject to Immigration Control (Housing Authority Accommodation and Homelessness) (Amendment) Regulations 2022
340	The Air Navigation (Restriction of Flying) (Biggin Hill) Regulations 2022
341	The Small Business, Enterprise and Employment Act 2015 and Pubs Code etc. (Amendment) Regulations 2022
342	The Social Security Benefits Up-rating Regulations 2022
343 (W. 85)	The Firefighters’ Pension Scheme (Wales) (Amendment) Regulations 2022
344	The Social Security (Habitual Residence and Past Presence) (Amendment) Regulations 2022
345	Not Allocated
346	The Child Benefit and Tax Credits (Amendment) Regulations 2022
347	The Genetically Modified Organisms (Deliberate Release) (Amendment) (England) Regulations 2022
348 (W. 86)	The Coronavirus Act 2020 (Alteration of Expiry Date) (Wales) Regulations 2022
349	The Higher Education Short Course Loans Regulations 2022
350	The Human Medicines (Coronavirus and Influenza) (Amendment) Regulations 2022
351	The Air Navigation (Restriction of Flying) (Paignton) Regulations 2022
352	The Human Medicines (Amendments Relating to the Early Access to Medicines Scheme) Regulations 2022
353 (W. 87)	The A40 Trunk Road (Pensarn Roundabout to Pont Lesneven Roundabout, Carmarthen, Carmarthenshire) (Temporary Prohibition of Vehicles) Order 2022
354	The Further Education Loans (Amendment) Regulations 2022
355 (W. 88)	The Local Government and Elections (Wales) Act 2021 (Consequential Amendments and Transitional Provision) (Chief Executives) Regulations 2022
356	The Air Navigation (Restriction of Flying) (Jet Formation Display Teams) Regulations 2022
357	The European Union (Withdrawal) Act 2018 (Repeal of EU Restrictions in Devolution Legislation, etc.) Regulations 2022
358	The Combined Authorities (Borrowing) Regulations 2022
359	The Air Navigation (Restriction of Flying) (Ragley Hall, Alcester) Regulations 2022
360	The Organic Production (Amendment) Regulations 2022
361	The Value Added Tax (Installation of Energy-Saving Materials) Order 2022
362	The Coronavirus Act 2020 (Delay in Expiry: Inquests, Courts and Tribunals, and Statutory Sick Pay) (England and Wales and Northern Ireland) Regulations 2022
363	The Air Navigation (Restriction of Flying) (Liverpool and The Mersey) Regulations 2022
364	The Employment Allowance (Increase of Maximum Amount) Regulations 2022
365	The Excise Duties (Surcharges or Rebates) (Hydrocarbon Oils etc.) Order 2022
366	The Extradition Act 2003 (Part 1 Territories) (Designation of Prosecutors) (Scotland) Order 2022
367 (W. 89)	The Crime and Disorder Act 1998 (Additional Authority) (Wales) Order 2022
368	The Airports Slot Allocation (Alleviation of Usage Requirements) Regulations 2022
369	The Education (Induction Arrangements for School Teachers) (England) (Coronavirus) (Amendment) Regulations 2022
370 (W. 90)	The Council Tax (Long-term Empty Dwellings and Dwellings Occupied Periodically) (Wales) Regulations 2022
371 (W. 91)	The A458 Trunk Road (Welshpool, Powys) (Temporary Prohibition of Vehicles and Cyclists) Order 2022
372 (W. 92)	The Corporate Joint Committees (General) (Wales) Regulations 2022
373	The Northern Ireland Assembly Elections (Returning Officer's Charges) Order 2022
374 (W. 93)	The A470 Trunk Road (North of Cefn-coed-y-cymmer, Merthyr Tydfil) (Temporary 40 mph Speed Limit) Order 2022
375 (W. 94)	Caernarfon and Dinas Welsh Highland Railway (Transfer and Governance) Order 2022
376	The Customs (Additional Duty) (Russia and Belarus) Regulations 2022
377	The Food and Feed Safety (Miscellaneous Amendments and Transitional Provisions) Regulations 2022
378 (W. 95)	The Health Protection (Coronavirus Restrictions) (No. 5) (Wales) (Amendment) (No. 7) Regulations 2022
379 (W. 96)	The A470 Trunk Road (North Street, Rhayader, Powys) (Prohibition of Waiting) Order 2022
380	The Statutory Sick Pay (General) (Coronavirus Amendment) Regulations 2022
381	The Statutory Sick Pay (Coronavirus) (Suspension of Waiting Days) (Saving Provision) Regulations 2022
382	The National Minimum Wage (Amendment) Regulations 2022
383	The Flood Reinsurance (Amendment) Regulations 2022
384	The Social Security Contributions (Statutory Parental Bereavement Pay) (Amendment of Extent) (Northern Ireland) Regulations 2022
385	The Income Tax (Construction Industry Scheme) (Amendment) (Northern Ireland) Regulations 2022
386	The Air Navigation (Restriction of Flying) (Platinum Jubilee Flypast Rehearsals) Regulations 2022
387	The Air Navigation (Restriction of Flying) (Platinum Jubilee Flypast) Regulations 2022
388 (W. 97)	The Health Protection (Coronavirus Restrictions) (No. 5) (Wales) (Amendment) (No. 8) Regulations 2022
389	The Agriculture (Financial Assistance) (Amendment) Regulations 2022
390	The Agriculture (Lump Sum Payment) (England) Regulations 2022
391	The M5 Motorway (Junctions 1 to 3) (60 Miles Per Hour Speed Limit) Regulations 2022
392	The Registered Pension Schemes (Miscellaneous Amendments) Regulations 2022
393	The Money Laundering and Terrorist Financing (High-Risk Countries) (Amendment) Regulations 2022
394	The Air Navigation (Restriction of Flying) (Revocation) Regulations 2022
395	The Russia (Sanctions) (EU Exit) (Amendment) (No. 7) Regulations 2022
396	The Commissioner for Patient Safety (Appointment and Operation) (England) Regulations 2022
397	The Early Legal Advice Pilot Scheme Order 2022
398	The National Security and Investment Act 2021 (Prescribed Form and Content of Notices and Validation Applications) (Amendment) Regulations 2022
399	The Annual Tax on Enveloped Dwellings (Indexation of Annual Chargeable Amounts) Order 2022
400 (W. 98)	The A470 Trunk Road (Coryton Interchange, Cardiff to north of Taffs Well Interchange, Rhondda Cynon Taf) (Temporary 50 mph Speed Limit) Order 2022

== 401–500 ==
Number	Title
401	[The Electricity Supplier Payments (Amendment) Regulations 2022
402 (W. 99)	The National Health Service (Charges to Overseas Visitors) (Amendment) (No. 2) (Wales) Regulations 2022
403 (W. 100)	The Education (Postgraduate Student Support) (Miscellaneous Amendments) (Wales) Regulations 2022
404	The National Health Service (General Medical Services Contracts and Personal Medical Services Agreements) (Amendment) Regulations 2022
405	The Valuation for Rating (Plant and Machinery) (England) (Amendment) Regulations 2022
406	The European Market Infrastructure Regulation (United States of America Regulated Market Equivalence) Regulations 2022
407	The Direct Payments to Farmers (Reductions) (England) Regulations 2022
408	The Grants to the Churches Conservation Trust Order 2022
409 (C. 13)	The Scotland Act 2016 (Commencement No. 5) (Revocation and Amendment) Regulations 2022
410	The Trade in Dual-Use Items (Council Regulation (EC) No 428/2009) (Amendment) Regulations 2022
411	The M6 Toll Motorway (M6 Toll Junction T1 to T8, Staffordshire) (Temporary Restriction and Prohibition of Traffic) Order 2022
412 (W. 101)	The Local Authorities (Amendments Relating to Publication of Information) (Wales) Regulations 2022
413	The Energy Performance of Buildings (England and Wales) (Amendment) Regulations 2022
414	The Trade Remedies (Miscellaneous Amendments) Regulations 2022
415 (C. 14)	The Sentencing Act 2020 (Commencement No. 1) (England and Wales) Regulations 2022
416	The Social Security (Contributions) (Amendment No. 2) Regulations 2022
417 (W. 102)	The Agricultural Wages (Wales) Order 2022
418 (C. 15)	The Offensive Weapons Act 2019 (Commencement No. 2 and Saving Provision) Regulations 2022
419	The Air Navigation (Restriction of Flying) (London Luton Airport) (No. 2) Regulations 2022
420	The Non-Commercial Movement of Pet Animals (Amendment) (England) Regulations 2022
421	The South Humber Bank Energy Centre (Correction) Order 2022
422 (W. 103)	The A40 Trunk Road (Brecon Road and Monmouth Road, Abergavenny, Monmouthshire) (20 mph Speed Limit) Order 2022
423 (W. 104)	The General Power of Competence (Commercial Purpose) (Conditions) (Wales) (Amendment) Regulations 2022
424 (W. 105)	The Local Government (Relevant Authorities) (Power to Trade) (Wales) Order 2022
425	The Air Navigation (Restriction of Flying) (State Opening of Parliament) Regulations 2022
426	The Air Navigation (Restriction of Flying) (Ascot) Regulations 2022
427 (W. 106)	The Revised Code of Practice on the exercise of social services functions in relation to Part 4 (direct payments and choice of accommodation) and Part 5 (charging and financial assessment) of the Social Services and Well-being (Wales) Act 2014 (Appointed Day) Order 2022
428	The Social Security Benefits (Claims and Payments) (Modification) Regulations 2022
429	The Air Navigation (Restriction of Flying) (Isle of Wight) Regulations 2022
430	The Air Navigation (Restriction of Flying) (Duxford) Regulations 2022
431	The Air Navigation (Restriction of Flying) (Headcorn) Regulations 2022
432	The East Anglia ONE North Offshore Wind Farm Order 2022
433	The East Anglia TWO Offshore Wind Farm Order 2022
434 (W. 107)	The A40 Trunk Road (St Clears, Carmarthenshire) (Prohibition of Waiting, Loading and Unloading) Order 2022
435	The Air Navigation (Restriction of Flying) (Russian Aircraft) (Amendment) (No. 2) Regulations 2022
436	The Little Crow Solar Park Order 2022
437	The Air Navigation (Restriction of Flying) (Glastonbury Festival) Regulations 2022
438	The Air Navigation (Restriction of Flying) (Cleethorpes) Regulations 2022
439	The Council Tax (Discount Disregards and Exempt Dwellings) (Amendment) (England) Regulations 2022
440	The Air Navigation (Restriction of Flying) (Helicopter Flight) (No. 2) Regulations 2022
441	The Air Navigation (Restriction of Flying) (Royal Air Force Cosford) Regulations 2022
442	The Air Navigation (Restriction of Flying) (Wimbledon) Regulations 2022
443	The Air Navigation (Restriction of Flying) (Teignmouth) Regulations 2022
444	The Legislative Reform (Renewal of National Radio Multiplex Licences) Order 2022
445 (W. 108)	The Non-Commercial Movement of Pet Animals (Amendment) (Wales) Regulations 2022
446	The Air Navigation (Restriction of Flying) (Scarborough) Regulations 2022
447	The Air Navigation (Restriction of Flying) (Weston-Super-Mare) Regulations 2022
448	The Universal Credit (Local Welfare Provision Disregard) (Amendment) Regulations 2022
449	The Social Security and Council Tax Reduction Schemes (Amendment) Regulations 2022
450 (W. 109)	The Health Protection (Coronavirus Restrictions) (No. 5) (Wales) (Amendment) (No. 9) Regulations 2022
451 (W. 110)	The A483 Trunk Road (Llanelwedd, Powys) (Restricted Road) Order 2022
452	The Russia (Sanctions) (EU Exit) (Amendment) (No. 8) Regulations 2022
453	The Russia (Sanctions) (Overseas Territories) (Amendment) Order 2022
454	The Greenhouse Gas Emissions Trading Scheme (Amendment) Order 2022
455	The Air Navigation (Restriction of Flying) (Silverstone and Turweston) Regulations 2022
456 (C. 16)	The Youth Justice and Criminal Evidence Act 1999 (Commencement No. 23) Order 2022
457 (W. 111)	The A5 Trunk Road (Llangollen and Corwen, Denbighshire) (Temporary Prohibition of Waiting, Loading & Unloading) Order 2022
458	The Air Navigation (Restriction of Flying) (Farnborough) (No. 2) Regulations 2022
459	The Criminal Justice (Sentencing) (Licence Conditions) (Amendment) Order 2022
460	The Proscribed Organisations (Applications for Deproscription etc.) (Amendment) Regulations 2022
461	Not Allocated
462	The Terrorism Prevention and Investigation Measures (Polygraph) Regulations 2022
463 (W. 113)	The A55 Trunk Road (Junction 11 (Llys y Gwynt Interchange), Bangor, Gwynedd to the Wales/England Border) and the A494/A550 Trunk Road (Ewloe Interchange to the Wales/England Border, Flintshire) (Temporary Traffic Prohibitions and Restrictions) Order 2022
464	The Securitisation Companies and Qualifying Transformer Vehicles (Exemption from Stamp Duties) Regulations 2022
465	The Taxation of Securitisation Companies (Amendment) Regulations 2022
466	The Financial Services and Markets Act 2000 (Regulated Activities) (Amendment) Order 2022
467	The Emissions Performance Standard (Amendment) Regulations 2022
468 (W. 114)	The A5, A44, A55, A458, A470, A479, A483, A487, A489 and A494 Trunk Roads (Various Locations in North and Mid Wales) (Temporary Prohibition of Vehicles) Order 2022
469 (W. 115)	The A465 Trunk Road (Rhigos Roundabout, Rhondda Cynon Taff to Aberdulais Interchange, Neath Port Talbot) (Temporary Prohibition of Vehicles, Cyclists & Pedestrians) Order 2022
470	The Road Vehicles (Construction and Use) (Automated Vehicles) Order 2022
471 (C. 17)	The Armed Forces Act 2021 (Commencement No. 1) Regulations 2022
472 (W. 116)	The Genetically Modified Food and Feed (Authorisations) (Wales) Regulations 2022
473 (W. 117)	The Education (Student Finance) (Miscellaneous Amendments) (No. 2) (Wales) Regulations 2022
474	The International Tax Compliance (Amendment) Regulations 2022
475	The M54 to M6 Link Road Development Consent Order 2022
476 (W. 118)	The Regulated Services (Annual Returns) (Wales) (Amendment) (Coronavirus) Regulations 2022
477	The Russia (Sanctions) (EU Exit) (Amendment) (No. 9) Regulations 2022
478 (W. 119)	The A4042 Trunk Road (Edlogan Way Roundabout, Croesyceiliog to Court Farm Roundabout, Pontypool, Torfaen) (Temporary 50 mph Speed Limit) Order 2022
479 (W. 120)	The A55 Trunk Road (Junction 8A (Carreg Bran) & the A5 Trunk Road (The Lodge to Pentraeth Road Roundabout, Menai Bridge, Anglesey) (Temporary Prohibition of Vehicles, Cyclists & Pedestrians) Order 2022
480	Not Allocated
481	The Food Information (Amendment) (England) Regulations 2022
482	The Air Navigation (Restriction of Flying) (Auchenbreck) (Emergency) Regulations 2022
483	The Air Navigation (Restriction of Flying) (London Luton Airport) (No. 2) (Revocation) Regulations 2022
484	The Phytosanitary Conditions (Amendment) (No. 2) Regulations 2022
485 (W. 121)	The Allocation of Housing and Homelessness (Eligibility) (Wales) (Amendment) Regulations 2022
486	The Genetically Modified Food and Feed (Authorisations) (England) Regulations 2022
487	The Major Sporting Events (Income Tax Exemption) (Finalissima Football Match) Regulations 2022
488	The Air Navigation (Restriction of Flying) (Birmingham) Regulations 2022
489	The Major Sporting Events (Income Tax Exemption) (UEFA Women's EURO 2022 Finals) Regulations 2022
490	The Air Navigation (Restriction of Flying) (Forest of Bowland) (Emergency) Regulations 2022
491	The Export Control (Amendment) Order 2022
492	The Industrial Training Levy (Construction Industry Training Board) Order 2022
493	The Major Sporting Events (Income Tax Exemption) (2022 Birmingham Commonwealth Games) Regulations 2022
494	The Armed Forces (Service Complaints) (Amendment) Regulations 2022
495	The M6 Toll Motorway (M6 Junction 3a to Junction 11a) (Temporary Restriction and Prohibition of Traffic) Order 2022
496	The Armed Forces (Service Complaints Ombudsman Investigations) (Amendment) Regulations 2022
497	The Aviation Security (Amendment) Regulations 2022
498	The Sea Fisheries (Amendment) Regulations 2022
499 (W. 122)	The A40 Trunk Road (Westbound Exit and Entry Slip Roads at Travellers Rest Junction, Carmarthenshire) (Temporary Prohibition of Vehicles) Order 2022
500 (C. 18)	The Criminal Justice Act 2003 (Commencement No. 33) and Sentencing Act 2020 (Commencement No. 2) Regulations 2022

== 501–600 ==
Number	Title
501	The Air Navigation (Restriction of Flying) (Auchenbreck) (Emergency) (Revocation) Regulations 2022
502	The Air Navigation (Restriction of Flying) (Forest of Bowland) (Emergency) (Revocation) Regulations 2022
503	The Child Support (Amendments Relating to Electronic Communications and Information) (England and Wales and Scotland) Regulations 2022
504	The Licensing Act 2003 (Platinum Jubilee Licensing Hours) Order 2022
505	The Special Constables (Membership of the Police Federation etc.) (England and Wales) Regulations 2022
506	The Air Navigation (Restriction of Flying) (Platinum Jubilee Events, London) Regulations 2022
507	The Air Navigation (Restriction of Flying) (Queen Elizabeth Olympic Park) Regulations 2022
508	The Air Navigation (Restriction of Flying) (Boscombe Down) Regulations 2022
509 (C. 19)	The Financial Guidance and Claims Act 2018 (Commencement No. 9) Regulations 2022
510	The Air Navigation (Restriction of Flying) (Swansea Bay) Regulations 2022
511	The Anti-social Behaviour, Crime and Policing Act 2014 (Publication of Public Spaces Protection Orders) (Amendment) Regulations 2022
512 (W. 123)	The Health Protection (Coronavirus Restrictions) (No. 5) (Wales) (Amendment) (No. 10) Regulations 2022
513	The Air Navigation (Restriction of Flying) (Plymouth Hoe) Regulations 2022
514	The Air Navigation (Restriction of Flying) (Burslem) Regulations 2022
515 (C. 20)	The Health and Care Act 2022 (Commencement No. 1) Regulations 2022
516	The Competition Act 1998 (Vertical Agreements Block Exemption) Order 2022
517 (W. 124)	The Education (Revocation of Assessment Arrangements in the National Curriculum and Miscellaneous Amendments) (Wales) Regulations 2022
518 (C. 21)	The Environment Act 2021 (Commencement No. 3) Regulations 2022
519 (C. 22)	The Economic Crime (Transparency and Enforcement) Act 2022 (Commencement No. 1) Regulations 2022
520 (C. 23)	The Police, Crime, Sentencing and Courts Act 2022 (Commencement No. 1 and Transitional Provision) Regulations 2022
521	The Homelessness (Suitability of Accommodation) (Amendment) (England) Order 2022
522	The M42 Motorway (Junction 7a to Junction 9) and M6 Toll Motorway (M6 Junction 3a to M6 Toll Junction T1) (Temporary Prohibition of Traffic) Order 2022
523 (L. 6)	The Magistrates’ Courts (Amendment) Rules 2022
524	The Immigration (Passenger Transit Visa) (Amendment) Order 2022
525	The Customs Tariff (Preferential Trade Arrangements and Tariff Quotas) (Ukraine) (Amendment) Regulations 2022
526	The National Insurance Contributions (Application of Part 7 of the Finance Act 2004) (Amendment) Regulations 2022
527	The Air Navigation (Restriction of Flying) (Auchenbreck) (Emergency) (No. 2) Regulations 2022
528	The Customs (Variation of Import Duty) (Amendment) Regulations 2022
529	The Income Tax (Exemption of Social Security Benefits) Regulations 2022
530	The Social Security (Disability Assistance for Working Age People) (Consequential Amendments) (No. 2) Order 2022
531 (C. 24)	The Finance Act 2020, Section 112 (Local Loans) (Appointed Day) Regulations 2022
532	The National Health Service Commissioning Board and Clinical Commissioning Groups (Responsibilities and Standing Rules) (Amendment) Regulations 2022
533 (W. 125)	The Local Government and Elections (Wales) Act 2021 (Consequential Amendments) (Job-sharing and Assistants to the Executive) Regulations 2022
534	The Education (Student Fees, Awards and Support) (Amendment) (No. 2) Regulations 2022
535	The Protection of Wrecks (Designation and Amendment) (England) Order 2022
536 (C. 25)	The Youth Justice and Criminal Evidence Act 1999 (Commencement No. 24) Order 2022
537	The Air Navigation (Restriction of Flying) (Jet Formation Display Teams) (Amendment) Regulations 2022
538	The Air Navigation (Restriction of Flying) (Boscombe Down) (Amendment) Regulations 2022
539 (W. 126)	The A483 & A489 Trunk Roads (Newtown Bypass, Powys) (Temporary Prohibition of Vehicles, Cyclists & Pedestrians) Order 2022
540 (L. 7)	The Civil and Family Proceedings Fees (Amendment) Order 2022
541 (W. 127)	The A5 Trunk Road (High Street, Bethesda, Gwynedd) (Temporary Prohibition of Vehicles) Order 2022
542 (W. 128)	The A55 Trunk Road (Slip Roads at Junction 3 (Pencaledog Interchange), Anglesey) (Temporary Prohibition of Vehicles) Order 2022
543	The Food and Feed (Fukushima Restrictions) (Revocation) (England) Regulations 2022
544 (C. 26)	The Fire Safety Act 2021 (Commencement) (England) Regulations 2022
545	The Protection of Trading Interests (Authorisation) (Amendment) Regulations 2022
546	The Air Navigation (Restriction of Flying) (Farnborough International Air Show) Regulations 2022
547	Fire Safety (England) Regulations 2022
548	The Value Added Tax (Reverse Charge Sales Statements) (Revocation, Saving and Transitional Provision) Regulations 2022
549	The M25 Junction 10/A3 Wisley Interchange Development Consent Order 2022
550	The Air Navigation (Restriction of Flying) (Southport) Regulations 2022
551	The Air Navigation (Restriction of Flying) (Platinum Jubilee Flypast Rehearsals) (Amendment) Regulations 2022
552	The Air Navigation (Restriction of Flying) (Royal International Air Tattoo) Regulations 2022
553 (C. 27)	The Domestic Abuse Act 2021 (Commencement No. 4) Regulations 2022
554	The Abortion (Northern Ireland) Regulations 2022
555	The Tax Credits and Child Benefit (Miscellaneous Amendments) Regulations 2022
556	The Access to the Countryside (Coastal Margin) (Shoreham by Sea to Eastbourne) Order 2022
557	The Air Navigation (Restriction of Flying) (Chelsea Flower Show) Regulations 2022
558	The Electricity (Individual Exemption from the Requirement for a Transmission Licence) (East Anglia One) (England) Order 2022
559	The Misuse of Drugs (Amendment) (Revocation) (England, Wales and Scotland) Regulations 2022
560	The Novel Foods (Authorisations) and Smoke Flavourings (Modification of Authorisations) (England) Regulations 2022
561 (C. 28)	The Building Safety Act 2022 (Commencement No. 1, Transitional and Saving Provisions) Regulations 2022
562	The Special Measures in Civil Proceedings (Specified Offences) Regulations 2022
563 (W. 129)	The Non-Domestic Rating (Amendment of Definition of Domestic Property) (Wales) Order 2022
564 (W. 130)	The Building (Amendment) (Wales) Regulations 2022
565	The Boiler Upgrade Scheme (England and Wales) Regulations 2022
566 (W. 131)	The Transition from Primary to Secondary School (Wales) Regulations 2022
567	The Prohibition of Cross-Examination in Person (Fees of Court-Appointed Qualified Legal Representatives) Regulations 2022
568	The Prohibition of Cross-Examination in Person (Civil and Family Proceedings) Regulations 2022
569 (C. 29)	The Finance Act 2022, Schedule 6 (Dormant Assets) (Appointed Day) Regulations 2022
570	The Air Navigation (Restriction of Flying) (Auchenbreck) (Emergency) (No. 3) Regulations 2022
571	The Nationality and Borders Act 2022 (Consequential Amendments) Regulations 2022
572	The Alternative Finance (Income Tax, Capital Gains Tax and Corporation Tax) Order 2022
573	The M25 Junction 28 Development Consent Order 2022
574 (W. 132)	The A40 Trunk Road (Robeston Wathen Roundabout to Pengawse Hill Junction, Pembrokeshire) (Temporary Traffic Prohibitions and Restrictions) Order 2022
575 (W. 133)	The Novel Foods (Authorisations) and Smoke Flavourings (Modification of Authorisations) (Wales) Regulations 2022
576	The Civil Enforcement of Road Traffic Contraventions (Representations and Appeals) (England) Regulations 2022
577	The Agriculture and Horticulture Development Board (Amendment) Order 2022
578	The Leasehold Reform (Ground Rent) (Business Lease Notices) Regulations 2022
579	Not Allocated
580 (W. 134)	The A40, A487, A4076, A477, A48, A483, A465, A470, A4060, A4232, A4042, A449 and A466 Trunk Roads & the A48(M), M4 and M48 Motorways (Various Locations in South and West Wales) (Temporary Prohibition of Vehicles) Order 2022
581	The Immigration and Nationality (Fees) (Amendment) Regulations 2022
582 (C. 30)	The Dormant Assets Act 2022 (Commencement) Regulations 2022
583	The Air Navigation (Restriction of Flying) (Stonehenge) Regulations 2022
584	The Sentencing Act 2020 (Surcharge) (Amendment) Regulations 2022
585 (W. 135)	The Swansea (Closure of the Prince of Wales Dock) Harbour Revision Order 2022
586 (W. 136)	The A40 Trunk Road (Nantyffin to Brynich Roundabout, Brecon, Powys) (Temporary Prohibition of Vehicles, Cyclists and Pedestrians) Order 2022
587 (C. 31)	The Automated and Electric Vehicles Act 2018 (Commencement No. 2) Regulations 2022
588	The Customs (Export Declarations) (Amendment) Regulations 2022
589	The Air Navigation (Restriction of Flying) (Revocation) (No. 2) Regulations 2022
590	The Nationality and Borders Act 2022 (Commencement No. 1, Transitional and Saving Provisions) Regulations 2022
591	The Integrated Care Boards (Nomination of Ordinary Members) Regulations 2022
592	The Green Gas Support Scheme (Amendment) Regulations 2022
593	The Branded Health Service Medicines (Costs) (Amendment) Regulations 2022
594 (W. 137)	The Food and Feed (Fukushima Restrictions) (Revocation) (Wales) Regulations 2022
595	The Wireless Telegraphy (Mobile Repeater) (Exemption) Regulations 2022
596 (W. 138)	The A458 Trunk Road (Broad Street & High Street, Welshpool, Powys) (Temporary Prohibition of Vehicles) Order 2022
597 (W. 139)	The A40 Trunk Road (Haverfordwest Eastern Bypass, Pembrokeshire) (Temporary Speed Restrictions & No Overtaking) Order 2022
598	The Customs (Additional Duty) (Russia and Belarus) (Amendment) Regulations 2022
599	The Education (Information About Individual Pupils) (England) (Amendment) Regulations 2022
600	The Local Authority and Greater London Authority Elections (Nomination of Candidates) (Amendment) (England) Rules 2022

== 601–700 ==
Number	Title
601	The Allocation of Housing and Homelessness (Eligibility) (England) and Persons Subject to Immigration Control (Housing Authority Accommodation and Homelessness) (Amendment) (No. 2) Regulations 2022
602	The British Nationality (General, British Overseas Territories and Fees) (Amendment) Regulations 2022
603	The Building etc. (Amendment) (England) Regulations 2022
604	The Air Navigation (Restriction of Flying) (Sunderland) (Emergency) Regulations 2022
605	The Armed Forces (Service Court Rules) (Amendment) Rules 2022
606	The Air Navigation (Restriction of Flying) (Sunderland) (Emergency) (Revocation) Regulations 2022
607	The M56 Motorway (Junctions 6 to 7) (Variable Speed Limits) Regulations 2022
608	The Common Organisation of the Markets in Agricultural Products (Third Country Listing for Fruit and Vegetables) (Amendment, etc.) Regulations 2022
609	The Common Organisation of the Markets in Agricultural Products (Marketing Standards and Organic Products) (Transitional Provisions) (Amendment) Regulations 2022
610	The Football (Offences) (Designation of Football Matches) (Amendment) Order 2022
611	The Cremation (England and Wales) (Amendment) (No. 2) Regulations 2022
612	The Coroners (Investigations) (Amendment) Regulations 2022
613	The Customs Tariff (Preferential Trade Arrangements) (Amendment) Regulations 2022
614	The National Health Service (Charges to Overseas Visitors) (Amendment) (No. 3) Regulations 2022
615	The Customs (Amendments and Miscellaneous Provisions) Regulations 2022
616	The Health Protection (Notification) (Amendment) Regulations 2022
617	The Football Spectators (Prescription) Order 2022
618 (W. 140)	The Meat Preparations (Wales) (Amendment) Regulations 2022
619	The Novel Foods (Authorisations) and Smoke Flavourings (Modification of Authorisations) (Amendment) (England) Regulations 2022
620 (W. 141)	The M4 Motorway (Junction 45 (Ynysforgan) to Junction 46 (Llangyfelach), Swansea) (Temporary 50 mph Speed Limit) Order 2022
621	The Official Controls (Extension of Transitional Periods) (Amendment) Regulations 2022
622	The Restriction of the Use of Certain Hazardous Substances in Electrical and Electronic Equipment (Amendment) Regulations 2022
623 (C. 32)	The Youth Justice and Criminal Evidence Act 1999 (Commencement No. 25) Order 2022
624	The Inspectors of Education, Children's Services and Skills (No. 2) Order 2022
625 (C. 33)	The Armed Forces Act 2021 (Commencement No. 2) Regulations 2022
626	The Allocation of Housing and Homelessness (Eligibility) (England) and Persons Subject to Immigration Control (Housing Authority Accommodation and Homelessness) (Amendment) (No. 3) Regulations 2022
627	The Virgin Islands Constitution (Interim Amendment) Order 2022
628	The Customs (Miscellaneous Amendments) Regulations 2022
629	The Merchant Shipping (Control and Management of Ships’ Ballast Water and Sediments) Order 2022
630	The Social Security (Medical Evidence) and Statutory Sick Pay (Medical Evidence) (Amendment) (No. 2) Regulations 2022
631	The Public Regulated Service (Galileo) (Revocation) Regulations 2022
632	The National Health Service (Areas of Integrated Care Boards: Appointed Day) Regulations 2022
633	The Customs (Safety and Security Procedures) Regulations 2022
634	The Health and Care Act 2022 (Consequential and Related Amendments and Transitional Provisions) Regulations 2022
635	The National Health Service (Integrated Care Boards: Responsibilities) Regulations 2022
636	The National Health Service (Integrated Care Boards: Description of NHS Primary Medical Services) Regulations 2022
637	The Aviation Safety (Amendment) Regulations 2022
638 (C. 34)	The Economic Crime (Transparency and Enforcement) Act 2022 (Commencement No. 2 and Saving Provision) Regulations 2022
639 (W. 142)	The Cancellation of Student Loans for Living Costs Liability (Wales) Regulations 2022
640	The Power to Award Degrees etc. (Spurgeon's College) Order 2022
641	The Air Navigation (Restriction of Flying) (Commonwealth Games) Regulations 2022
642	The National Health Service (Joint Working and Delegation Arrangements) (England) Regulations 2022
643	The Designation of Freeport Tax Sites (Plymouth and South Devon Freeport) Regulations 2022
644	The Air Navigation (Restriction of Flying) (Auchenbreck) (Emergency) (No. 4) Regulations 2022
645	The A2 Trunk Road (Thanington Westbound Off Slip) (Detrunking) Order 2022
646	The Air Navigation (Restriction of Flying) (East Kirkby) Regulations 2022
647	The Air Navigation (Restriction of Flying) (Eastbourne) Regulations 2022
648	The Air Navigation (Restriction of Flying) (Blackpool) (No. 2) Regulations 2022
649 (C. 35)	The Traffic Management Act 2004 (Commencement No. 11) (England) Order 2022
650 (W. 143)	The A470 Trunk Road (Northbound Entry Slip Road at Taffs Well, Rhondda Cynon Taf) (Temporary Prohibition of Wide Vehicles) Order 2022
651	The Network Rail (Essex and Others Level Crossing Reduction) Order 2022
652 (C. 36) (W. 144)	The Curriculum and Assessment (Wales) Act 2021 (Commencement No. 3 and Transitional Provision) Order 2022
653	The Access to the Countryside (Coastal Margin) (Aust to Brean Down No. 1) Order 2022
654	The Air Navigation (Restriction of Flying) (Folkestone) Regulations 2022
655 (W. 145)	The Provision of Information by Head Teachers to Parents and Adult Pupils (Wales) Regulations 2022
656 (W. 146)	The Education (Information About Individual Pupils) (Wales) (Amendment) Regulations 2022
657 (W. 147)	The Health Protection (Notification) (Wales) (Amendment) Regulations 2022
658	The Air Navigation (Restriction of Flying) (Jet Formation Display Teams) (No. 2) Regulations 2022
659	The Toys and Cosmetic Products (Restriction of Chemical Substances) Regulations 2022
660	The Passport (Fees) Regulations 2022
661	The Tameside (Electoral Changes) Order 2022
662	The School Admissions (England) (Coronavirus) (Appeals Arrangements) (Amendment) Regulations 2022
663 (W. 148) (C. 37)	The Additional Learning Needs and Education Tribunal (Wales) Act 2018 (Amendment of Commencement Order No. 5 and Commencement Order No. 6) Order 2022
664	The Fylde (Electoral Changes) Order 2022
665	The Stoke-on-Trent (Electoral Changes) Order 2022
666 (W. 149)	The Curriculum and Assessment (Wales) Act 2021 (Consequential Amendments) (Secondary Legislation) (No. 1) Regulations 2022
667	The Air Navigation (Restriction of Flying) (Royal Air Force Valley) Regulations 2022
668	The Air Navigation (Restriction of Flying) (Bournemouth) Regulations 2022
669	The Freedom of Information (Additional Public Authorities) Order 2022
670 (W. 150)	The Education (Temporary Exceptions for Individual Pupils and Children) (Wales) Regulations 2022
671 (W. 151)	The A40 Trunk Road (Eastbound Exit and Entry Slip Roads at Travellers Rest Junction, Carmarthenshire) (Temporary Prohibition of Vehicles) Order 2022
672	The Pollution Prevention and Control (Fees) (Miscellaneous Amendments) Regulations 2022
673	The Air Navigation (Restriction of Flying) (The Palace of Holyroodhouse) Regulations 2022
674	The Terrorism Act 2000 (Code of Practice for Examining Officers and Review Officers) Order 2022
675 (W. 152)	The A55 Trunk Road (Junction 10 (Caernarfon Road Interchange), Bangor, Gwynedd to Junction 8 (Llanfairpwll Interchange), Anglesey) (Temporary Traffic Prohibitions & Restrictions) Order 2022
676 (W. 153)	The Education in Multiple Settings (Wales) Regulations 2022
677	Not Allocated
678 (W. 154)	The A483 Trunk Road (The Strand, Builth Wells, Powys) (Temporary Prohibition of Vehicles) Order 2022
679 (W. 155)	The Curriculum and Assessment (Wales) Act 2021 (Consequential Amendments) (Secondary Legislation) (No. 2) Regulations 2022
680 (C. 38)	The Police, Crime, Sentencing and Courts Act 2022 (Commencement No. 1 and Transitional Provision) (Amendment) Regulations 2022
681	The Dogger Bank Creyke Beck Offshore Wind Farm (Amendment) Order 2022
682	The Freedom of Information (Removal of References to Public Authorities) Order 2022
683	The Air Navigation (Restriction of Flying) (Auchenbreck) (Emergency) (No. 5) Regulations 2022
684	The Air Navigation (Restriction of Flying) (Newmarket Racecourse) Regulations 2022
685 (W. 156)	The A55 Trunk Road (Blackbridge to Junction 2 (Holyhead), Anglesey) (Temporary Traffic Prohibitions & Restriction) Order 2022
686	The Civil Enforcement of Moving Traffic Contraventions Designations and Miscellaneous Amendments Order 2022
687	The National Health Service (General Medical Services Contracts and Personal Medical Services Agreements) (Amendment) (No. 2) Regulations 2022
688	The Air Navigation (Restriction of Flying) (Burton in Lonsdale) (Emergency) Regulations 2022
689	The Russia (Sanctions) (EU Exit) (Amendment) (No. 10) Regulations 2022
690	The Research and Development (Qualifying Bodies) (Tax) (Amendment and Further Prescribed Bodies) Order 2022
691	The Contracts for Difference (Miscellaneous Amendments) Regulations 2022
692	The Air Navigation (Restriction of Flying) (Commonwealth Games) (No. 2) Regulations 2022
693	The Television Licences (Disclosure of Information) Act 2000 (Prescription of Information) Order 2022
694 (C. 39)	The Leasehold Reform (Ground Rent) Act 2022 (Commencement) Regulations 2022
695	The Air Navigation (Restriction of Flying) (Jet Formation Display Teams) (Amendment) (No. 2) Regulations 2022
696	The Air Navigation (Restriction of Flying) (Helicopter Flight) (No. 3) Regulations 2022
697	The General Pharmaceutical Council (Amendment) Rules Order of Council 2022
698	The Air Navigation (Restriction of Flying) (Burton in Lonsdale) (Emergency) (Revocation) Regulations 2022
699	The Liability of Trade Unions in Proceedings in Tort (Increase of Limits on Damages) Order 2022
700	The M48 Motorway (Severn Bridge Speed) (Temporary Restriction of Traffic) Order 2022

== 701–800 ==
Number	Title
701	The Solicitors Act 1974 and Administration of Justice Act 1985 (Amendment) Order 2022
702	The Electricity (Individual Exemptions from the Requirement for a Generation Licence) (Scotland) Order 2022
703	The Criminal Justice (Sentencing) (Licence Conditions) (Amendment) (No. 2) Order 2022
704 (C. 40)	The Police, Crime, Sentencing and Courts Act 2022 (Commencement No. 2) Regulations 2022
705	The Remote Observation and Recording (Courts and Tribunals) Regulations 2022
706	The Direct Payments to Farmers (Advance Payments and Activation of Payment Entitlements) (Amendment) (England) Regulations 2022
707	The Smoke and Carbon Monoxide Alarm (Amendment) Regulations 2022
708	The Accounts and Audit (Amendment) Regulations 2022
709	The Dover Harbour Revision Order 2022
710 (W. 157)	The A4076 Trunk Road (Victoria Road, Hamilton Terrace and Great North Road, Milford Haven, Pembrokeshire) (Temporary Prohibition of Vehicles) Order 2022
711	The Building Safety (Leaseholder Protections) (England) Regulations 2022
712	The Construction Products (Amendment) Regulations 2022
713 (C. 41)	The Youth Justice and Criminal Evidence Act 1999 (Commencement No. 26) Order 2022
714	The Norfolk Rivers Internal Drainage Board Order 2022
715 (W. 158)	The National Health Service (Charges to Overseas Visitors) (Amendment) (No. 3) (Wales) Regulations 2022
716 (C. 42)	The Criminal Justice and Courts Act 2015 (Commencement No. 8) Order 2022
717	The Parole Board (Amendment) Rules 2022
718	The Building (Approved Inspectors etc.) (Amendment) (England) Regulations 2022
719 (W. 159)	The A5 Trunk Road (Menai Suspension Bridge, Anglesey and Gwynedd) (Temporary Prohibition of Large Vehicles) Order 2022
720	The Coasting Schools (England) Regulations 2022
721 (C. 43)	The Pension Schemes Act 2021 (Commencement No. 6 and Transitional Provision) Regulations 2022
722 (W. 160)	The Council Tax (Amendments Relating to Discount Disregards and Exempt Dwellings) (Wales) Regulations 2022
723	The Registered Pension Schemes (Authorised Member Payments) Regulations 2022
724 (C. 44)	The Education (Careers Guidance in Schools) Act 2022 (Commencement) Regulations 2022
725	The Register of Overseas Entities (Verification and Provision of Information) Regulations 2022
726	The Financial Services and Markets Act 2000 (Regulated Activities) (Amendment) (No. 2) Order 2022
727	The Goods Vehicles (Licensing of Operators) (Amendment) (No. 2) Regulations 2022
728	The Football Spectators (Seating) Order 2022
729	The Air Navigation (Restriction of Flying) (Cosby Airshow) Regulations 2022
730	The Land Registration (Amendment) Rules 2022
731	The Air Navigation (Restriction of Flying) (Topcliffe) Regulations 2022
732	The Air Navigation (Restriction of Flying) (Abingdon Air and Country Show) Regulations 2022
733	The Occupational Pension Schemes (Climate Change Governance and Reporting) (Amendment, Modification and Transitional Provision) Regulations 2022
734 (C. 45)	The Health and Care Act 2022 (Commencement No. 2 and Transitional and Saving Provision) Regulations 2022
735	The Import of Animals and Animal Products and Approved Countries (Amendment) Regulations 2022
736	The National Health Service (Integrated Care Boards: Exceptions to Core Responsibility) Regulations 2022
737	The Merchant Shipping (Control and Management of Ships’ Ballast Water and Sediments) Regulations 2022
738	The A47 Blofield to North Burlingham Development Consent Order 2022
739	The Official Controls (Plant Health) (Frequency of Checks) Regulations 2022
740	The Offshore Installations (Safety Zones) (No. 2) Order 2022
741	The Local Government (Exclusion of Non-commercial Considerations) (England) Order 2022
742	The Gender Recognition (Disclosure of Information) (England) Order 2022
743	The Care and Support (Charging and Assessment of Resources) (Amendment) (No. 2) Regulations 2022
744 (W. 161)	The Curriculum and Assessment (Wales) Act 2021 (Consequential Amendments) (Primary Legislation) Regulations 2022
745	The Air Navigation (Restriction of Flying) (St. Andrews) Regulations 2022
746	The Police, Crime, Sentencing and Courts Act 2022 (Consequential Provision) Regulations 2022
747 (W. 162)	The A55 Trunk Road (Pen-y-clip Tunnel, Conwy County Borough) (Temporary Traffic Prohibitions & Restrictions) Order 2022
748	The Republic of Belarus (Sanctions) (EU Exit) (Amendment) Regulations 2022
749	The Air Navigation (Restriction of Flying) (Plymouth Hoe) (No. 2) Regulations 2022
750	The Air Navigation (Restriction of Flying) (Clacton-on-Sea) Regulations 2022
751	The Air Navigation (Restriction of Flying) (Rhyl) Regulations 2022
752	The Universal Credit (Transitional Provisions) Amendment Regulations 2022
753	The Safety of Sports Grounds (Designation) (Amendment) (England) (No. 2) Order 2022
754	The Taxation of Chargeable Gains (Gilt-edged Securities) Order 2022
755	The Air Navigation (Restriction of Flying) (SS Richard Montgomery) Regulations 2022
756 (W. 163)	The A470 Trunk Road (Storey Arms, Powys) (Temporary Part-time 30 mph Speed Limit) Order 2022
757	The Access to the Countryside (Coastal Margin) (Tilbury to Southend) Order 2022
758 (W. 164)	The Curriculum and Assessment (Wales) Act 2021 (Consequential Amendments) (Secondary Legislation) (No. 3) Regulations 2022
759	The Access to the Countryside (Coastal Margin) (Burnham-on-Crouch to Maldon) Order 2022
760	The Access to the Countryside (Coastal Margin) (Southend to Wallasea Island) Order 2022
761	The Air Navigation (Restriction of Flying) (Bedford) (Emergency) Regulations 2022
762	The Statutory Auditors and Third Country Auditors (Amendment) Regulations 2022
763 (W. 165)	The A40 Trunk Road (Near Sennybridge, Powys) (Temporary Prohibition of Vehicles, Cyclists and Pedestrians) Order 2022
764 (W. 166)	The Education (Student Finance) (Ukrainian Nationals and Family Members) (Miscellaneous Amendments) (Wales) Regulations 2022
765	The Rural Development (Amendment) (England) Regulations 2022
766	The Public Procurement (International Trade Agreements) (Amendment) Regulations 2022
767 (W. 167)	The Building Safety Act 2022 (Consequential Amendments) (Approved Inspectors) (Wales) Regulations 2022
768	Not Allocated
769	The Local Authority and Combined Authority Elections (Nomination of Candidates) (Amendment) (England) Regulations 2022
770	The Corporate Interest Restriction (Electronic Communications) Regulations 2022
771	The Seal Products (Amendment) Regulations 2022
772	The Warm Home Discount (England and Wales) Regulations 2022
773 (C. 46)	The Youth Justice and Criminal Evidence Act 1999 (Commencement No. 27) Order 2022
774 (W. 169) (C. 47)	The Building Safety Act 2022 (Commencement No. 1) (Wales) Regulations 2022
775	The Air Navigation (Restriction of Flying) (Bedford) (Emergency) (Revocation) Regulations 2022
776	The Derbyshire Dales (Electoral Changes) Order 2022
777	The Mansfield (Electoral Changes) Order 2022
778	The Oldham (Electoral Changes) Order 2022
779	The Air Navigation (Restriction of Flying) (Lee Valley VeloPark) Regulations 2022
780	The Customs (Tariff and Reliefs) (Amendment) Regulations 2022
781 (W. 170)	The Renting Homes (Rent Determination) (Converted Contracts) (Wales) Regulations 2022
782	The Money Laundering and Terrorist Financing (High-Risk Countries) (Amendment) (No. 2) Regulations 2022
783 (L. 8)	The Civil Procedure (Amendment No. 2) Rules 2022
784	The Non-Domestic Rating (Transitional Protection Payments and Rates Retention) (Amendment) Regulations 2022
785	The Air Navigation (Restriction of Flying) (Auchenbreck) (No. 6) (Emergency) Regulations 2022
786	The School Teachers’ Incentive Payments (England) (Amendment) Order 2022
787	The Public Service Pensions (Employer Cost Cap and Specified Restricted Scheme) Regulations 2022
788	The School Discipline (Pupil Exclusions and Reviews) (England) (Amendment) Regulations 2022
789	Not Allocated
790	The Police Act 1996 (Amendment and Consequential Amendments) Regulations 2022
791	The Air Navigation (Restriction of Flying) (Royal Air Force Mildenhall) Regulations 2022
792	The Russia (Sanctions) (EU Exit) (Amendment) (No. 11) Regulations 2022
793	The Home Loss Payments (Prescribed Amounts) (England) Regulations 2022
794 (W. 172)	The Agricultural Wages (No. 2) (Wales) Order 2022
795 (W. 173)	The Renting Homes (Wales) Act 2016 (Amendment of Schedule 12) Regulations 2022
796 (W. 174)	The Welsh Language Standards (No. 8) Regulations 2022
797 (W. 175)	The Corporate Joint Committees (General) (No. 2) (Wales) Regulations 2022
798	The Judicial Offices (Sitting in Retirement – Prescribed Offices and Descriptions) Regulations 2022
799 (W. 176)	The Renting Homes (Wales) Act 2016 (Housing Association Tenancies: Fundamental Provisions) Regulations 2022
800 (W. 177)	The Restricted Roads (20 mph Speed Limit) (Wales) Order 2022

== 801–900 ==
Number	Title
801	The Russia (Sanctions) (EU Exit) (Amendment) (No. 12) Regulations 2022
802 (W. 178)	The Local Government Investigations (Functions of Monitoring Officers and Standards Committees) (Wales) (Amendment) Regulations 2022
803 (W. 179)	The Renting Homes (Wales) Act 2016 (Amendment) Regulations 2022
804 (W. 180)	The Plant Health etc. (Fees) (Amendment) (Wales) (EU Exit) (No. 2) Regulations 2022
805 (W. 181)	The Conduct of Members (Principles) (Wales) (Amendment) Order 2022
806 (W. 182)	The Local Authorities (Model Code of Conduct) (Wales) (Amendment) Order 2022
807 (W. 183)	The Fishguard to Bangor Trunk Road (A487) (Chimneys Link Trunking and De-Trunking, Pembrokeshire) Order 2022
808	The Care Standards Act 2000 (Extension of the Application of Part 2 to Supported Accommodation) (England) Regulations 2022
809	The Charnwood (Electoral Changes) Order 2022
810	The Amber Valley (Electoral Changes) Order 2022
811	The Abortion (Amendment) Regulations 2022
812	The Mid Sussex (Electoral Changes) Order 2022
813	The Social Fund Winter Fuel Payment (Temporary Increase) Regulations 2022
814	The Russia (Sanctions) (EU Exit) (Amendment) (No. 13) Regulations 2022
815 (L. 9)	The Criminal Procedure (Amendment No. 2) Rules 2022
816 (C. 48)	The Criminal Justice Act 2003 (Commencement No. 34) and Judicial Review and Courts Act 2022 (Commencement No. 1) Regulations 2022
817	The Air Navigation (Restriction of Flying) (Auchenbreck) (No. 6) (Emergency) (Amendment) Regulations 2022
818	The Sanctions (EU Exit) (Miscellaneous Amendments) (No. 2) Regulations 2022
819	The Sanctions (EU Exit) (Miscellaneous Amendments) Regulations 2022
820	The Northumberland Line Order 2022
821 (L. 10)	The Family Procedure (Amendment No. 2) Rules 2022
822	The Airports Slot Allocation (Alleviation of Usage Requirements) (No. 2) Regulations 2022
823	The Suffolk (Electoral Changes) Order 2022
824	The Luton (Electoral Changes) Order 2022
825	The Occupational Pension Schemes (Governance and Registration) (Amendment) Regulations 2022
826	Not Allocated
827	The Occupational Pension Schemes (Investment) (Employer-related investments by Master Trusts) (Amendment) Regulations 2022
828 (C. 49)	The Offensive Weapons Act 2019 (Commencement No. 2) (England and Wales) (Amendment) Regulations 2022
829	The Ecclesiastical Judges, Legal Officers and Others (Fees) Order 2022
830	The Street Works (Inspection Fees) (England) Regulations 2022
831	The Street and Road Works (Miscellaneous Amendments) (England) Regulations 2022
832 (W. 184)	The Regulated Services (Service Providers and Responsible Individuals) (Wales) (Amendment) Regulations 2022
833	Not Allocated
834	The Legislative Reform (Provision of Information etc. Relating to Disabilities) Order 2022
835	The Aquatic Animal Health (Amendment) Regulations 2022
836	The Plant Health etc. (Miscellaneous Fees) (Amendment) (England) Regulations 2022
837 (W. 185)	The A487 Trunk Road (Lay-by at Glandyfi, Ceredigion) (Restriction of Waiting) Order 2022
838	The Financial Services Act 2021 (Prudential Regulation of Credit Institutions and Investment Firms) (Consequential Amendments and Miscellaneous Provisions) Regulations 2022
839	The Construction Contracts (England) Exclusion Order 2022
840 (C. 50)	The Domestic Abuse Act 2021 (Commencement No. 5 and Transitional Provision) Regulations 2022
841	The Power to Award Degrees etc. (NCG) Order of Council 2016 (Amendment) Order 2022
842	The Contracts for Difference (Allocation) and Electricity Market Reform (General) (Amendment) Regulations 2022
843	The Russia (Sanctions) (Overseas Territories) (Amendment) (No. 2) Order 2022
844	The Hovercraft (Application of Enactments) and Merchant Shipping (Prevention of Pollution) (Law of the Sea Convention) Amendment Order 2022
845	The Motor Vehicles (International Circulation) (Amendment) Order 2022
846	The Animal Welfare (Miscellaneous Amendments) Regulations 2022
847	The Payment and Electronic Money Institution Insolvency (England and Wales) (Amendment) Rules 2022
848	The Criminal Legal Aid (Remuneration) (Amendment) Regulations 2022
849	The Pharmacy (Responsible Pharmacists, Superintendent Pharmacists etc.) Order 2022
850	The Russia (Sanctions) (EU Exit) (Amendment) (No. 14) Regulations 2022
851	The Pharmacy (Preparation and Dispensing Errors – Hospital and Other Pharmacy Services) Order 2022
852	Conduct of Employment Agencies and Employment Businesses (Amendment) Regulations 2022
853	The Sizewell C (Nuclear Generating Station) Order 2022
854	The Financial Services and Markets Act 2000 (Consequential Amendments of References to Rules and Miscellaneous Amendments) Regulations 2022
855	The Pensions Act 2004 (Code of Practice) (Authorisation and Supervision of Collective Defined Contribution Schemes) Appointed Day Order 2022
856 (C. 51)	The Forensic Science Regulator Act 2021 (Commencement No. 1 and Transitional Provision) Regulations 2022
857	The United Kingdom Internal Market Act 2020 (Exclusions from Market Access Principles: Single-Use Plastics) Regulations 2022
858	The Beavers (England) Order 2022
859	The Building Safety (Leaseholder Protections) (Information etc.) (England) Regulations 2022
860	The Money Laundering and Terrorist Financing (Amendment) (No. 2) Regulations 2022
861	The Common Agricultural Policy (Cross-Compliance Exemptions and Transitional Regulation) (Amendment) (EU Exit) Regulations 2022
862	The Business and Planning Act 2020 (Pavement Licences) (Coronavirus) (Amendment) Regulations 2022
863 (C. 52)	The Immigration Act 2016 (Commencement No. 1 and Transitional Provisions) (Scotland and Northern Ireland) Regulations 2022
864	The Air Navigation (Restriction of Flying) (Auchenbreck) (No. 6) (Emergency) (Revocation) Regulations 2022
865	The International Criminal Court Act 2001 (Guernsey) Order 2022
866	The Air Navigation (Restriction of Flying) (Wembley Stadium) Regulations 2022
867	The Attachment of Jersey to the Diocese of Salisbury Order 2022
868	The Air Navigation (Restriction of Flying) (Portrush) Regulations 2022
869	The Air Navigation (Restriction of Flying) (Belarusian Aircraft) (Revocation) Regulations 2022
870	The Register of Overseas Entities (Delivery, Protection and Trust Services) Regulations 2022
871	The Network Rail (Oxford Station Phase 2 Improvements (Land Only)) Order 2022
872	The Network Rail (Oxford Station Phase 2 Improvements (Land Only)) (No. 2) Order 2022
873	The Protection of Trading Interests (Authorisation) (Amendment) (No. 2) Regulations 2022
874 (C. 53)	The Finance Act 2021, Schedule 5 (Pension Schemes: Collective Money Purchase Benefits) (Appointed Day) Regulations 2022
875	The Electricity and Gas (Energy Company Obligation) Order 2022
876 (C. 54)	The Economic Crime (Transparency and Enforcement) Act 2022 (Commencement No. 3) Regulations 2022
877	The Slavery and Human Trafficking (Definition of Victim) Regulations 2022
878	The Power to Award Degrees etc. (University College of Estate Management) Order of Council 2018 (Amendment) Order 2022
879	The Legal Officers (Annual Fees) Order 2022
880	The Air Navigation (Restriction of Flying) (Birmingham) (No. 2) Regulations 2022
881	The Able Marine Energy Park Development Consent (Amendment) Order 2022
882 (W. 186)	The A40 Trunk Road (Monmouth Road, Abergavenny, Monmouthshire) (Temporary Prohibition of Pedestrians) Order 2022
883	The Access to the Countryside (Coastal Margin) (Calshot to Gosport) Order 2022
884	The Access to the Countryside (Coastal Margin) (Gosport to Portsmouth) Order 2022
885	The European Parliamentary Elections (Amendment and Revocation) (United Kingdom and Gibraltar) (EU Exit) Regulations 2022
886	The Universal Credit (Administrative Earnings Threshold) (Amendment) Regulations 2022
887 (W. 187)	The A470 Trunk Road (Eglwysbach, near Tal-y-cafn, Conwy County Borough) (Temporary Traffic Restrictions & Prohibition) Order 2022
888	The Air Navigation (Restriction of Flying) (Croydon) (Emergency) Regulations 2022
889	The Education (Student Loans) (Repayment) (Amendment) (No. 2) Regulations 2022
890	The Air Navigation (Restriction of Flying) (Croydon) (Emergency) (Revocation) Regulations 2022
891 (C. 55) (W. 188)	The Additional Learning Needs and Education Tribunal (Wales) Act 2018 (Commencement No. 8 and Transitional and Saving Provisions) Order 2022
892 (C. 56) (W. 189)	The Additional Learning Needs and Education Tribunal (Wales) Act 2018 (Commencement No. 9 and Transitional and Saving Provisions) Order 2022
893 (C. 57) (W. 190)	The Additional Learning Needs and Education Tribunal (Wales) Act 2018 (Commencement No. 10) Order 2022
894 (C. 58) (W. 191)	The Additional Learning Needs and Education Tribunal (Wales) Act 2018 (Commencement No. 11) Order 2022
895 (C. 59) (W. 192)	The Additional Learning Needs and Education Tribunal (Wales) Act 2018 (Commencement No. 12) Order 2022
896 (C. 60) (W. 193)	The Additional Learning Needs and Education Tribunal (Wales) Act 2018 (Commencement No. 13 and Transitional and Saving Provisions) Order 2022
897 (C. 61) (W. 194)	The Additional Learning Needs and Education Tribunal (Wales) Act 2018 (Commencement No. 14 and Transitional and Saving Provisions) Order 2022
898 (C. 62) (W. 195)	The Additional Learning Needs and Education Tribunal (Wales) Act 2018 (Commencement No. 15) Order 2022
899	The Customs Tariff (Preferential Trade Arrangements) (Amendment) (No. 2) Regulations 2022
900	The Air Navigation (Restriction of Flying) (Jet Formation Display Teams) (No. 2) (Amendment) Regulations 2022

== 901–1000 ==
Number	Title
901	The Norfolk Boreas Offshore Wind Farm (Corrections) Order 2022
902	The Environment Agency (Holme Styes Reservoir) Drought Order 2022
903	The Air Navigation (Restriction of Flying) (Duxford) (No. 2) Regulations 2022
904 (W. 196) (C. 63)	The Renting Homes (Amendment) (Wales) Act 2021 (Commencement) Order 2022
905	The Independent School Standards and Non-Maintained Special Schools (England) (Amendment) Regulations 2022
906 (C. 64) (W. 197)	The Renting Homes (Wales) Act 2016 (Commencement No. 2 and Consequential Amendments) Order 2022
907 (W. 198)	The Renting Homes (Wales) Act 2016 (Consequential Amendments to Secondary Legislation) Regulations 2022
908 (C. 65)	The Elections Act 2022 (Commencement No. 1 and Saving Provision) Regulations 2022
909 (C. 66)	The Mental Health Units (Use of Force) Act 2018 (Commencement No. 3) Regulations 2022
910	The M48 Motorway (Severn Bridge Half Marathon) (Temporary Prohibition of Traffic) Order 2022
911	The A47 North Tuddenham to Easton Development Consent Order 2022
912 (C. 67)	The Nationality and Borders Act 2022 (Commencement No. 2) Regulations 2022
913 (W. 199)	The Additional Learning Needs and Education Tribunal (Wales) Act 2018 (Consequential and Miscellaneous Amendments) Regulations 2022
914	The Power to Award Degrees etc. (The London Interdisciplinary School Ltd) (Amendment) Order 2022
915	The Free Zone (Customs Site No. 1 Solent) Designation Order 2022
916 (C. 68)	The Elections Act 2022 (Commencement No. 2) Regulations 2022
917 (W. 200)	The A477 Trunk Road (St Clears, Carmarthenshire to Pembroke Dock, Pembrokeshire) (Temporary Speed Restrictions & No Overtaking) Order 2022
918	The Power to Award Degrees etc. (Multiverse Group Limited) Order 2022
919	The York Potash Harbour Facilities (Amendment) Order 2022
920 (W. 201)	The A494 Trunk Road (Bala, Gwynedd) (Temporary Prohibition of Vehicles and 40 MPH Speed Limit) Order 2022
921	The Air Navigation (Restriction of Flying) (Lodge Shinness, Lairg, Highlands) (Emergency) Regulations 2022
922	The Manston Airport Development Consent Order 2022
923	The Power to Award Degrees etc. (University for the Creative Arts) Order 2022
924	The Non-Commercial Movement of Pet Animals (Amendment) (England) (No. 2) Regulations 2022
925	The Air Navigation (Restriction of Flying) (Lodge Shinness, Lairg, Highlands) (Emergency) (Revocation) Regulations 2022
926	The African Swine Fever (Import Controls) (England and Scotland) Order 2022
927 (C. 69)	The Building Safety Act 2022 (Commencement No. 2) Regulations 2022
928 (W. 202)	The A4042 Trunk Road (Caerleon Roundabout, Newport to Cwmbran Roundabout, Torfaen) (Temporary Prohibition of Vehicles) Order 2022
929	The Insolvency Proceedings (Fees) (Amendment) Order 2022
930	The National Health Service (Pharmaceutical and Local Pharmaceutical Services) (Amendment) Regulations 2022
931 (C. 70)	The Telecommunications (Security) Act 2021 (Commencement) Regulations 2022
932	The Employment Appeal Tribunal (Amendment) Rules 2022
933	The Electronic Communications (Security Measures) Regulations 2022
934	The A428 Black Cat to Caxton Gibbet Development Consent Order 2022
935	The National Health Service (General Medical Services Contracts and Personal Medical Services Agreements) (Amendment) (No. 3) Regulations 2022
936 (C. 71)	The Professional Qualifications Act 2022 (Commencement No. 1) Regulations 2022
937	The Electronic Communications (Universal Service) (Amendment) Order 2022
938	The Food Information (Amendment of Transitional Provisions) (England) Regulations 2022
939 (W. 203)	The Food Information (Amendment of Transitional Provisions) (Wales) Regulations 2022
940	The Air Navigation (Restriction of Flying) (Birmingham) (No. 3) Regulations 2022
941	The Air Navigation (Restriction of Flying) (Tottenham Hotspur Football Stadium) Regulations 2022
942	The Housing Benefit and Universal Credit (Victims of Domestic Abuse and Victims of Modern Slavery) (Amendment) Regulations 2022
943	The Accounting Standards (Prescribed Bodies) (United States of America and Japan) (Amendment) Regulations 2022
944	The Norfolk Vanguard Offshore Wind Farm (Corrections) Order 2022
945	The Air Navigation (Restriction of Flying) (Birmingham) (No. 3) (Amendment) Regulations 2022
946	The Air Navigation (Restriction of Flying) (Moreton-in-Marsh) Regulations 2022
947	The Air Navigation (Restriction of Flying) (Remembrance Sunday) Regulations 2022
948 (W. 204)	The Non-Commercial Movement of Pet Animals (Amendment) (Wales) (No. 2) Regulations 2022
949	The Apprenticeships (Miscellaneous Provisions) (Amendment) (No. 2) (England) Regulations 2022
950 (W. 205)	The A487 Trunk Road (Caernarfon and Bontnewydd Bypass, Gwynedd) (Temporary Prohibition of Vehicles) Order 2022
951 (C. 72)	The Youth Justice and Criminal Evidence Act 1999 (Commencement No. 28) Order 2022
952	The Air Navigation (Restriction of Flying) (Central London) Regulations 2022
953	The Air Navigation (Restriction of Flying) (Balmoral to Edinburgh) Regulations 2022
954	The Sovereign Grant Act 2011 (Duration of Sovereign Grant Provisions) Order 2022
955	The Air Navigation (Restriction of Flying) (Balmoral to Edinburgh) (Amendment) Regulations 2022
956	The Power to Award Degrees etc. (Blackpool and The Fylde College) Order of Council 2016 (Amendment) Order 2022
957	The Air Navigation (Restriction of Flying) (Belfast) Regulations 2022
958	The Air Navigation (Restriction of Flying) (Helicopter Flight) (No. 4) Regulations 2022
959	The Air Navigation (Restriction of Flying) (Cardiff) Regulations 2022
960	The Air Navigation (Restriction of Flying) (Sandringham House) (Restricted Zone EG R219) (Amendment) Regulations 2022
961	The Air Navigation (Restriction of Flying) (Helicopter Flight) (No. 5) Regulations 2022
962	The Air Navigation (Restriction of Flying) (London and Windsor) Regulations 2022
963	The Air Navigation (Restriction of Flying) (London and Windsor) (Amendment) Regulations 2022
964	The Bolton (Electoral Changes) Order 2022
965 (C. 73)	The Skills and Post-16 Education Act 2022 (Commencement No. 1 and Transitional Provision) (England) Regulations 2022
966	The Stockton-on-Tees (Electoral Changes) Order 2022
967	The Wolverhampton (Electoral Changes) Order 2022
968	The Norfolk Boreas Offshore Wind Farm (Amendment) Order 2022
969 (W. 206)	The A55 Trunk Road (Junction 10 (Caernarfon Road Interchange) to Junction 9 (Treborth Interchange), Bangor, Gwynedd) (Temporary Prohibition of Vehicles, Cyclists and Pedestrians) Order 2022
970 (W. 207)	The A458 Trunk Road (Broad Street & High Street, Welshpool, Powys) (Temporary Prohibition of Vehicles) (No. 2) Order 2022
971 (W. 208)	The A458 Trunk Road (Trewern, Powys) (Temporary Prohibition of Vehicles, Cyclists & Pedestrians) Order 2022
972	The Designation of Freeport Tax Sites (Plymouth and South Devon Freeport) (No. 2) Regulations 2022
973	The Designation of Freeport Tax Sites (Solent Freeport) (No. 2) Regulations 2022
974	The Air Navigation (Restriction of Flying) (Air Races) (Amendment) Regulations 2022
975	The School Admission Appeals Code (Appointed Day) (England) Order 2022
976	The Electricity (Individual Exemption from the Requirement for a Transmission Licence) (Triton Knoll) (England) Order 2022
977	The Football Spectators (2022 World Cup Control Period) Order 2022
978	The Alcohol Licensing (Coronavirus) (Regulatory Easements) (Amendment) Regulations 2022
979	The Police Act 1997 (Criminal Records) (Amendment No. 2) Regulations 2022
980	The Customs (Tariff Quotas) (EU Exit) (Amendment) Regulations 2022
981	The Customs (Tariff and Reliefs) (Amendment) (No. 2) Regulations 2022
982	The Response to the Committee on Climate Change Report (Extension of Period) Order 2022
983	The Income-related Benefits (Subsidy to Authorities) Amendment Order 2022
984	The Building etc. (Amendment) (England) (No. 2) Regulations 2022
985	The Charities (Royal Holloway and Bedford New College) Order 2022
986	Not Allocated
987	The Statutory Sick Pay (Coronavirus) (Suspension of Waiting Days) (Saving Provision) (Northern Ireland) Regulations 2022
988 (C. 75)	The Environment Act 2021 (Commencement No. 4) Regulations 2022
989 (W. 209)	The A458 Trunk Road (Buttington Cross, Buttington, Powys) (Temporary Prohibition of Vehicles) Order 2022
990	The Social Security (Habitual Residence and Past Presence) (Amendment) (No. 2) Regulations 2022
991	The National Health Service Pension Schemes (Member Contributions etc.) (Amendment) (No. 2) Regulations 2022
992 (C. 76)	The Youth Justice and Criminal Evidence Act 1999 (Commencement No. 29) Order 2022
993 (W. 210)	The Building (Amendment) (Wales) (No. 2) Regulations 2022
994 (W. 211)	The Town and Country Planning (Use Classes) (Amendment) (Wales) Order 2022
995	The Criminal Legal Aid (Standard Crime Contract) (Amendment) Regulations 2022
996 (W. 212)	The Health and Social Care (Quality and Engagement) (Wales) Act 2020 (Commencement No. 2) Order 2022
997 (W. 213)	The Town and Country Planning (General Permitted Development etc.) (Amendment) (Wales) Order 2022
998 (W. 214)	The A470 Trunk Road (Blaenau Ffestiniog, Gwynedd) (Temporary Traffic Prohibitions & Restriction) Order 2022
999 (W. 215)	The A55 Trunk Road (Junction 5 (Treban) to Junction 7 (Cefn Du), Anglesey) (Temporary Prohibition of Vehicles, Cyclists & Pedestrians) Order 2022
1000	The Air Navigation (Restriction of Flying) (Leicester) Regulations 2022

== 1001–1100 ==
Number	Title
1001	The Air Navigation (Restriction of Flying) (Wembley Stadium) (No. 2) Regulations 2022
1002	The Air Navigation (Restriction of Flying) (Moreton-in-Marsh) (No. 2) Regulations 2022
1003 (C. 77)	The Health and Care Act 2022 (Commencement No. 3) Regulations 2022
1004	The Norfolk Vanguard Offshore Wind Farm (Amendment) Order 2022
1005	The Cat and Dog Fur (Control of Movement etc.) (EU Exit) Regulations 2022
1006	Transfer of Undertakings (Protection of Employment) (Transfer of Staff to the Scottish Courts and Tribunals Service) Regulations 2022
1007	The Food (Promotion and Placement) (England) (Amendment) Regulations 2022
1008	The Air Navigation (Restriction of Flying) (Helicopter Flight) (No. 6) Regulations 2022
1009	Not Allocated
1010	The Criminal Legal Aid (Remuneration) (Amendment) (Amendment) Regulations 2022
1011	The Social Security Additional Payments (Second Qualifying Day) Regulations 2022
1012	The Transfer of Undertakings (Protection of Employment) (Transfer of Staff to the Scottish Courts and Tribunals Service) Regulations 2022
1013	The Approved Premises (Substance Testing) Act 2022 (Commencement) Regulations 2022
1014 (C. 79)	The Public Service Pensions and Judicial Offices (Commencement No. 1 and Transitional and Saving Provision) Regulations 2022
1015	The East Anglia THREE Offshore Wind Farm (Amendment) Order 2022
1016	The Air Navigation (Restriction of Flying) (Helicopter Flight) (No. 6) (Amendment) Regulations 2022
1017 (W. 216)	The A494 Trunk Road (Pensarn Road, High Street & Station Road, Bala, Gwynedd) (Temporary Prohibition of Vehicles) Order 2022
1018	The Social Security (Scotland) Act 2018 (Winter Heating Assistance) (Consequential Modifications) Order 2022
1019	The Compulsory Electronic Monitoring Licence Condition (Amendment) Order 2022
1020	The Pests of Plants (Authorisations) (Amendment) Regulations 2022
1021 (W. 217)	The Marketing of Seeds and Plant Propagating Material (Wales) (Amendment) (EU Exit) Regulations 2022
1022	The Protection of Freedoms Act 2012 (Destruction, Retention and Use of Biometric Data) (Transitional, Transitory and Saving Provisions) (Amendment) Order 2022
1023 (C. 80)	The Pharmacy (Responsible Pharmacists, Superintendent Pharmacists etc.) Order 2022 (Commencement) Order of Council 2022
1024 (C. 81)	The Pharmacy (Preparation and Dispensing Errors – Hospital and Other Pharmacy Services) Order 2022 (Commencement) Order of Council 2022
1025 (W. 218)	The Non-Domestic Rating (Property in Common Occupation) (Wales) Regulations 2022
1026 (W. 219)	The A487 Trunk Road (Fishguard, Pembrokeshire to Cardigan, Ceredigion) (Temporary Traffic Prohibitions & Restrictions) Order 2022
1027 (W. 220)	The Land Transaction Tax (Tax Bands and Tax Rates) (Wales) (Amendment) Regulations 2022
1028	The National Health Service Pension Schemes (Member Contributions etc.) (Amendment) (No. 3) Regulations 2022
1029	The Local Elections (Principal Areas) (England and Wales) (Amendment) (England) Rules 2022
1030 (L. 11)	The Tribunal Procedure (Amendment No. 2) Rules 2022
1031 (W. 221)	The A479 Trunk Road (Glanusk Park to Bronllys, Powys) (Temporary Prohibition of Traffic) Order 2022
1032	Not Allocated
1033	The Office of Communications (Membership) (Modification) Order 2022
1034	The Employment Tribunals (Constitution and Rules of Procedure) (Amendment) Regulations 2022
1035	The Criminal Legal Aid (Remuneration) (Amendment) (Amendment) (No. 2) Regulations 2022
1036 (W. 222)	The A458 Trunk Road (Broad Street & High Street, Welshpool, Powys) (Temporary Prohibition of Vehicles) (No. 3) Order 2022
1037	The Chemicals (Health and Safety) Trade and Miscellaneous Amendments Regulations 2022
1038	The Care and Support (Charging and Assessment of Resources) (Amendment) (No. 3) Regulations 2022
1039 (C. 82)	The Economic Crime (Transparency and Enforcement) Act 2022 (Commencement No. 4) Regulations 2022
1040	The Air Navigation (Restriction of Flying) (Helicopter Flight) (No. 7) Regulations 2022
1041	The School Teachers’ Pay and Conditions (England) Order 2022
1042	The Export Control (Amendment) (No. 2) Order 2022
1043	The School Teachers’ Pay and Conditions (England) (No. 2) Order 2022
1044 (C. 83)	The Pension Schemes Act 2021 (Commencement No. 7 and Transitory Provision) Regulations 2022
1045	The Armed Forces Act (Continuation) Order 2022
1046	The Inspectors of Education, Children's Services and Skills (No. 3) Order 2022
1047	The Free Zone (Customs Site No. 1 Felixstowe) Designation Order 2022
1048	The Free Zone (Customs Site No. 1 Plymouth) Designation Order 2022
1049	The Free Zone (Customs Site Designation) (Miscellaneous Amendments) Order 2022
1050	The Air Navigation (Carbon Offsetting and Reduction Scheme for International Aviation) (Amendment) Order 2022
1051	The Armed Forces (Tri-Service Serious Crime Unit) (Consequential Amendments) Regulations 2022
1052	Not Allocated
1053	The Hampshire and Isle of Wight Police Area (Consequential Amendments) Regulations 2022
1054	The Police, Crime, Sentencing and Courts Act 2022 (Extraction of Information: Code of Practice) Regulations 2022
1055	The Double Taxation Relief and International Tax Enforcement (Luxembourg) Order 2022
1056 (C. 84)	The Nationality and Borders Act 2022 (Commencement No. 3) Regulations 2022
1057	The Telecommunications Infrastructure (Leasehold Property) (Conditions and Time Limits) Regulations 2022
1058 (W. 223)	The Education (Induction Arrangements for School Teachers) (Wales) (Amendment) Regulations 2022
1059	The Environment Agency (Upper Black Moss and Lower Black Moss Reservoirs) Drought Order 2022
1060	The Ministry of Defence Police (Committee) (Amendment) Regulations 2022
1061	The Police, Crime, Sentencing and Courts Act 2022 (Consequential Provision) (No. 2) (England and Wales) Regulations 2022
1062	The Immigration and Nationality (Fees) (Amendment) (No. 2) Regulations 2022
1063	The Immigration (Registration with Police) (Revocation) Regulations 2022
1064	The Public Interest Disclosure (Prescribed Persons) (Amendment) Order 2022
1065	The Air Navigation (Restriction of Flying) (Royal Air Force Coningsby) Regulations 2022
1066 (W. 224)	The Child Minding and Day Care (Disqualification) (Wales) Regulations 2022
1067	The Network Rail (Huddersfield to Westtown (Dewsbury) Improvements) Order 2022
1068	The Air Navigation (Restriction of Flying) (Queen Elizabeth II Bridge, West Thurrock) (Emergency) Regulations 2022
1069 (W. 225)	The Homelessness (Priority Need and Intentionality) (Wales) Regulations 2022
1070	The A47/A11 Thickthorn Junction Development Consent Order 2022
1071	The Sentencing Act 2020 (Serious Violence Reduction Orders: Retention and Disposal of Seized Items) Regulations 2022
1072	The Air Navigation (Restriction of Flying) (Queen Elizabeth II Bridge, West Thurrock) (Emergency) (Revocation) Regulations 2022
1073	The Warm Home Discount (Scotland) Regulations 2022
1074 (W. 226)	The Regulated Services (Service Providers and Responsible Individuals) (Wales) (Amendment) and (Coronavirus) (Revocation) Regulations 2022
1075 (C. 85)	The Police, Crime, Sentencing and Courts Act 2022 (Commencement No. 3) Regulations 2022
1076 (W. 227)	The Renting Homes (Fitness for Human Habitation) (Wales) (Amendment) Regulations 2022
1077 (W. 228)	The Renting Homes (Wales) Act 2016 (Consequential Amendments to Secondary Legislation) (Amendment) Regulations 2022
1078 (W. 229)	The Renting Homes (Rent Determination) (Converted Contracts) (Wales) (Amendment) Regulations 2022
1079	The Police and Crime Commissioner Elections (Designations etc.) (Amendment) Order 2022
1080	The Financial Services (Miscellaneous Amendments) (EU Exit) Regulations 2022
1081 (W. 230)	The A465 Trunk Road (Ebbw Vale East Junction to Tredegar Interchange, Blaenau Gwent) (Temporary Prohibition of Vehicles and Cyclists) Order 2022
1082	The Motor Fuel (Composition and Content) (Amendment) (Northern Ireland) Regulations 2022
1083	The Central Rating List and Telecommunications Apparatus (England) (Amendment) Regulations 2022
1084 (W. 231)	The A5 Trunk Road (Allt Dinas, Betws-y-coed, Conwy County Borough) (40 mph Speed Limit) Order 2022
1085	The Access to the Countryside (Coastal Margin) (Whitstable to Iwade) Order 2022
1086	The Access to the Countryside (Coastal Margin) (Amble to Bamburgh) Order 2022
1087	The Terrorism Act 2000 (Alterations to the Search Powers Code for England and Wales and Scotland) Order 2022
1088	The Access to the Countryside (Coastal Margin) (Iwade to Grain No. 1) Order 2022
1089	The Yorkshire Water Services Limited (River Ouse, Moor Monkton) Drought Order 2022
1090	The Animals, Food, Plant Health, Plant Propagating Material and Seeds (Miscellaneous Amendments etc.) Regulations 2022
1091	The Wireless Telegraphy (Licence Charges for the 3.4 GHz Frequency Band and the 3.6 GHz Frequency Band) Regulations 2022
1092	The Sanctions (Damages Cap) Regulations 2022
1093 (C. 86)	The Elections Act 2022 (Commencement No. 3 and Saving Provision) Regulations 2022
1094	Railways (Penalty Fares) (Amendment) Regulations 2022
1095 (C. 87)	The Armed Forces Act 2021 (Commencement No. 3) Regulations 2022
1096	The Renewable Heat Incentive Scheme (Amendment) Regulations 2022
1097	The Public Sector Bodies (Websites and Mobile Applications) Accessibility (Amendment) (EU Exit) Regulations 2022
1098	The Digital Government (Disclosure of Information) (Amendment) Regulations 2022
1099 (W. 232)	The A489 Trunk Road (Heol Maengwyn, Machynlleth) (Prohibition of Waiting) Order 2022
1100	The Energy Bill Relief Scheme Regulations 2022

== 1101–1406 ==
Number	Title
1101	The Energy Bill Relief Scheme Pass-through Requirement (Heat Suppliers) (England and Wales and Scotland) Regulations 2022
1102	The Energy Bills Support Scheme and Energy Price Guarantee Pass-through Requirement (England and Wales and Scotland) Regulations 2022
1103	The Energy Bill Relief Scheme Pass-through Requirement (England and Wales and Scotland) Regulations 2022
1104	The Energy Prices (Designated Domestic Energy Price Reduction Schemes for Great Britain and Designated Bodies) Regulations 2022
1105	The Energy Prices (Domestic Supply) (Northern Ireland) Regulations 2022
1106	The Energy Bill Relief Scheme (Northern Ireland) Regulations 2022
1107	The Airports Slot Allocation (Alleviation of Usage Requirements) (No. 3) Regulations 2022
1108	The Exotic Animal Disease (Amendment) (England) Order 2022
1109 (C. 88)	The Charities Act 2022 (Commencement No. 1, Consequential and Saving Provision) Regulations 2022
1110	The Russia (Sanctions) (EU Exit) (Amendment) (No. 15) Regulations 2022
1111	The Greater London Authority Elections (Amendment) Rules 2022
1112	The Road Traffic Act 1988 (Police Driving: Prescribed Training) Regulations 2022
1113	The Air Navigation (Restriction of Flying) (Stokes Bay) Regulations 2022
1114	The Air Navigation (Restriction of Flying) (New Year Celebrations, London) Regulations 2022
1115	The Air Navigation (Restriction of Flying) (Edinburgh) Regulations 2022
1116	The Air Navigation (Restriction of Flying) (Remembrance Sunday, Manchester) Regulations 2022
1117	The Air Navigation (Restriction of Flying) (Cheltenham) (No. 2) Regulations 2022
1118 (W. 233)	The Feed Additives (Authorisations) (Wales) Regulations 2022
1119 (W. 234)	The A5 Bethesda – Bangor Road (40 mph Speed Limit) Order 2022
1120	The Phytosanitary Conditions (Amendment) (No. 3) Regulations 2022
1121	The Animal Health (Poultry Compartments, Approved Disinfectants and Animal Gatherings) (Fees) (England) (Amendment) Order 2022
1122	The Russia (Sanctions) (EU Exit) (Amendment) (No. 16) Regulations 2022
1123	The Energy Prices (Designated Domestic Price Reduction Schemes) (Northern Ireland) Regulations 2022
1124	The Energy Bill Relief Scheme Pass-through Requirement (Heat Suppliers) (Northern Ireland) Regulations 2022
1125	The Energy Bill Relief Scheme and Energy Price Guarantee Pass-through Requirement and Miscellaneous Amendments Regulations 2022
1126	Not Allocated
1127 (W. 236)	The A465 Trunk Road (Ebbw Vale West Junction, Blaenau Gwent to Hardwick Roundabout, Monmouthshire) (Temporary Traffic Prohibitions and Restrictions) Order 2022
1128	The Flags (Northern Ireland) (Amendment) (No. 2) Regulations 2022
1129	The Feed Additives (Authorisations) (England) Regulations 2022
1130	The Air Navigation (Restriction of Flying) (Helicopter Flight) (No. 8) Regulations 2022
1131	The National Health Service (Performers Lists) (England) (Amendment) Regulations 2022
1132	The National Health Service (Primary Dental Services) (Amendment) Regulations 2022
1133	The Early Years Foundation Stage (Welfare Requirements) (England) (Amendment) Regulations 2022
1134	The Childcare (Free of Charge for Working Parents) (England) Regulations 2022
1135	The Stockport (Electoral Changes) Order 2022
1136	The Waverley (Electoral Changes) Order 2022
1137	The Stratford-on-Avon (Electoral Changes) Order 2022
1138	The Epsom and Ewell (Electoral Changes) Order 2022
1139	The North Lincolnshire (Electoral Changes) Order 2022
1140	The South Staffordshire (Electoral Changes) Order 2022
1141	The Tonbridge and Malling (Electoral Changes) Order 2022
1142	The Control of Mercury (Amendment) (EU Exit) Regulations 2022
1143 (W. 237)	The A494 Trunk Road (High Street, Bala, Gwynedd) (Temporary Prohibition of Vehicles) Order 2022
1144	The Hybrid and Other Mismatches (Financial Instruments: Excluded Instruments) (Amendment) Regulations 2022
1145	The Exclusivity Terms for Zero Hours Workers (Unenforceability and Redress) Regulations 2022
1146	The Crime (International Co-operation) Act 2003 (Designation of Participating Countries) (England, Wales and Northern Ireland) Order 2022
1147	The Taxation (International and Other Provisions) Act 2010 Transfer Pricing Guidelines Designation Order 2022
1148	The Childcare Payments (Miscellaneous Amendments) Regulations 2022
1149	The Local Land Charges (Amendment) Rules 2022
1150	The Common Organisation of the Markets in Agricultural Products (Amendment) Regulations 2022
1151	The Education (Student Loans) (Repayment) (Amendment) (No. 3) Regulations 2022
1152	The Subsidy Control (Information-Gathering Powers) (Modification) Regulations 2022
1153	The Subsidy Control (Subsidy Database Information Requirements) Regulations 2022
1154	The Tamar Bridge and Torpoint Ferry (Revision of Tolls and Traffic Classification) Order 2022
1155 (W. 238)	The A458 Trunk Road (Church Street, Welshpool, Powys) (Temporary Prohibition of Vehicles) Order 2022
1156 (W. 239)	The Animal Health (Poultry Compartments and Animal Gatherings) (Fees) (Wales) (Amendment) Order 2022
1157	The Financial Services (Gibraltar) (Amendment) (EU Exit) Regulations 2022
1158	The Air Navigation (Restriction of Flying) (Birmingham) (No. 4) Regulations 2022
1159 (W. 240)	The A4076 Trunk Road (Hamilton Terrace and Great North Road, Milford Haven, Pembrokeshire) (Temporary Prohibition of Vehicles) Order 2022
1160	The Armed Forces (Covenant) Regulations 2022
1161 (C. 89)	The Armed Forces Act 2021 (Commencement No. 4) Regulations 2022
1162	The Warm Home Discount (Reconciliation) Regulations 2022
1163	The Water Fluoridation (Consultation) (England) Regulations 2022
1164 (C. 90)	The Finance Act 2022, Part 2 of Schedule 5 (Insurance Contracts: Change in Accounting Standards) (Commencement and Savings Provision) Regulations 2022
1165	The Insurance Contracts (Tax) (Change in Accounting Standards) Regulations 2022
1166 (W. 241)	The Renting Homes (Wales) Act 2016 (Consequential Amendments) Regulations 2022
1167	The Russia (Sanctions) (Overseas Territories) (Amendment) (No. 3) Order 2022
1168	The Football Spectators (Relevant Offences) Regulations 2022
1169	The Merchant Shipping (Nuclear Ships) Regulations 2022
1170	Not Allocated
1171	The Housing (Right to Buy) (Designated Rural Areas and Designated Regions) (England) Order 2022
1172 (W. 242)	The Renting Homes (Wales) Act 2016 (Saving and Transitional Provisions) Regulations 2022
1173	The Greenhouse Gas Emissions Trading Scheme (Amendment) (No. 2) Order 2022
1174	The Health and Social Care Act (Northern Ireland) 2022 (Consequential Amendments) Order 2022
1175	The Adult Social Care Information (Enforcement) Regulations 2022
1176	The Gravesham (Electoral Changes) Order 2022
1177	Not Allocated
1178	The Guildford (Electoral Changes) Order 2022
1179	The West Lancashire (Electoral Changes) Order 2022
1180	The Channel Islands (Attachment of the Bailiwick of Guernsey to the Diocese of Salisbury) Order 2022
1181	The Employment Tribunals Act 1996 (Application of Conciliation Provisions) Order 2022
1182	The Ammonium Nitrate Materials (High Nitrogen Content) Safety (Amendment) (No. 2) Regulations 2022
1183	The Money Laundering and Terrorist Financing (High-Risk Countries) (Amendment) (No. 3) Regulations 2022
1184 (W. 243)	The School Teachers’ Pay and Conditions (Wales) Order 2022
1185	The Stamp Duty Land Tax (Service of Documents) Regulations 2022
1186	The Subsidy Control (Gross Cash Amount and Gross Cash Equivalent) Regulations 2022
1187 (C. 91)	The Police, Crime, Sentencing and Courts Act 2022 (Commencement No. 4 and Transitional Provisions) and Road Traffic Offenders Act 1988 (Commencement No. 1) Regulations 2022
1188 (W. 244)	The Child Minding and Day Care (Disqualification) (No. 2) (Wales) Regulations 2022
1189	The National Health Service (NHS Payment Scheme – Consultation) Regulations 2022
1190	The Storage of Carbon Dioxide (Amendment) (EU Exit) Regulations 2022
1191	The Higher Education (Investigation Fees) (England) Regulations 2022
1192 (L. 12)	The Court of Protection (Amendment) Rules 2022
1193	The Official Controls (Imports of High Risk Food and Feed of Non-Animal Origin) (Amendment of Commission Implementing Regulation (EU) 2019/1793) (England) Regulations 2022
1194	The Portishead Branch Line (MetroWest Phase 1) Order 2022
1195	The East Anglia THREE Offshore Wind Farm (Amendment) (No. 2) Order 2022
1196	The Greater London Authority (Consolidated Council Tax Requirement Procedure) Regulations 2022
1197	The Offshore Installations (Safety Zones) (No. 3) Order 2022
1198	The Non-Domestic Rating (Alteration of Lists and Appeals) (England) (Amendment) Regulations 2022
1199 (W. 245)	The A487 Trunk Road (Great Darkgate Street & Owain Glyndwr Square, Aberystwyth, Ceredigion) (Temporary Prohibition of Vehicles) Order 2022
1200	The Health and Care Act 2022 (Further Consequential Amendments) Regulations 2022
1201 (C. 92) (W. 246)	The Health Service Medical Supplies (Costs) Act 2017 (Commencement No. 1) (Wales) Order 2022
1202 (W. 247) (C. 93)	The Health and Care Act 2022 (Commencement No. 1) (Wales) Regulations 2022
1203	The Corporation Tax Act 2010 (Factors Determining Substantial Commercial Interdependence) Regulations 2022
1204 (W. 248) (C. 94)	The Agriculture Act 2020 (Commencement No. 2) (Wales) Regulations 2022
1205	The Power to Award Degrees etc. (Hull College Group) Order of Council 2015 (Amendment) Order 2022
1206	The A57 Link Roads Development Consent Order 2022
1207 (W. 249)	The National Health Service (Charges to Overseas Visitors) (Amendment) (No. 4) (Wales) Regulations 2022
1208	The Tax Credits Act 2002 (Additional Payments Modification and Disapplication) Regulations 2022
1209	The Nationality and Borders Act 2022 (Consequential Amendments) (No. 2) Regulations 2022
1210 (C. 95)	The Building Safety Act 2022 (Commencement No. 3 and Transitional Provision) Regulations 2022
1211 (W. 250)	The A458 Trunk Road (Broad Street & High Street, Welshpool, Powys) (Temporary Prohibition of Vehicles) (No. 4) Order 2022
1212	The Rehabilitation of Offenders Act 1974 (Exceptions) (Amendment) (England and Wales) Order 2022
1213	The Data Protection (Adequacy) (Republic of Korea) Regulations 2022
1214 (W. 251)	The Non-Domestic Rating Contributions (Wales) (Amendment) Regulations 2022
1215 (W. 252)	The Common Organisation of the Markets in Agricultural Products (Amendment) (Wales) Regulations 2022
1216	The Social Workers (Amendment and Transitional Provision) Regulations 2022
1217	The Renewable Heat Incentive Scheme (Amendment) (No. 2) Regulations 2022
1218	The Merchant Shipping (Additional Safety Measures for Bulk Carriers) Regulations 2022
1219	The Merchant Shipping (High Speed Craft) Regulations 2022
1220	The Pensions Dashboards Regulations 2022
1221	The Air Navigation (Restriction of Flying) (Scampton) (Restricted Zone EG R313) Regulations 2022
1222	The Producer Responsibility Obligations (Packaging Waste) (Amendment) (England and Wales) Regulations 2022
1223	The Financial Services (Miscellaneous Amendments) Regulations 2022
1224	The Avian Influenza and Influenza of Avian Origin in Mammals (Amendment) (England) Order 2022
1225	The Rural Development (Amendment) (No. 2) (England) Regulations 2022
1226 (C. 96)	The Elections Act 2022 (Commencement No. 4 and Savings) Regulations 2022
1227 (C. 97)	The Police, Crime, Sentencing and Courts Act 2022 (Commencement No. 5) Regulations 2022
1228 (C. 98)	The Trade Union Act 2016 (Commencement No. 5) Regulations 2022
1229	The Occupational Pensions (Revaluation) Order 2022
1230	The Police, Fire and Crime Commissioner for Cumbria (Fire and Rescue Authority) Order 2022
1231	The European University Institute (EU Exit) Regulations 2022
1232	The Local Authorities (Capital Finance and Accounting) (England) (Amendment) Regulations 2022
1233 (W. 253)	The A4076 Trunk Road (Hamilton Terrace, Milford Haven, Pembrokeshire) (Temporary Prohibition of Vehicles) Order 2022
1234	The Merchant Shipping (Prevention of Oil Pollution and Prevention of Pollution by Sewage from Ships) (Amendment) Regulations 2022
1235	The Aviation Safety and Air Traffic Management (Amendment) Regulations 2022
1236	The Democratic Republic of the Congo (Sanctions) (EU Exit) (Amendment) Regulations 2022
1237	The Religious Character of 16 to 19 Academies (Designation Procedure) (England) Regulations 2022
1238	Not Allocated
1239	The Payment and Electronic Money Institution Insolvency (Scotland) Rules 2022
1240	The Cessation of EU Law Relating to Prohibitions on Grounds of Nationality and Free Movement of Persons Regulations 2022
1241	The EU Agencies (Revocations) Regulations 2022
1242	The Thames Water Utilities Limited (Thames Tideway Tunnel) (Amendment) Order 2022
1243	The Income Tax (Pay As You Earn) (Amendment) Regulations 2022
1244	The Central Counterparties (Transitional Provision) (Extension and Amendment) Regulations 2022
1245 (W. 254)	The A5 Trunk Road (Menai Suspension Bridge, Anglesey and Gwynedd) (Temporary Prohibition of Vehicles and Cyclists) Order 2022
1246	The Subsidy Control (Subsidies and Schemes of Interest or Particular Interest) Regulations 2022
1247	The Guarantees of Origin of Electricity Produced from Renewable Energy Sources and High-efficiency Cogeneration (Amendment) (EU Exit) Regulations 2022
1248	The A417 Missing Link Development Consent Order 2022
1249	The Public Interest Disclosure (Prescribed Persons) (Amendment) (No. 2) Order 2022
1250	The State Pension Debits and Credits (Revaluation) Order 2022
1251	The State Pension Revaluation for Transitional Pensions Order 2022
1252	The Financial Services and Markets Act 2000 (Qualifying Provisions) (Amendment) Order 2022
1253	The National Health Service (Charges to Overseas Visitors) (Amendment) (No. 4) Regulations 2022
1254 (W. 255)	The Local Authorities (Capital Finance and Accounting) (Wales) (Amendment) Regulations 2022
1255 (C. 99)	The Agriculture Act 2020 (Commencement No. 2) (England) Regulations 2022
1256	The Education (School Teachers’ Qualifications and Induction Arrangements) (Amendment) (England) Regulations 2022
1257	The Street Works (Charges for Occupation of the Highway) (West Sussex County Council) Order 2022
1258 (W. 256)	The Renting Homes (Wales) Act 2016 (Amendment of Schedule 12 and Consequential Amendment) Regulations 2022
1259 (W. 257)	The Marine, Fisheries and Aquaculture (Financial Assistance) Scheme (Wales) Regulations 2022
1260	The Drivers’ Hours, Tachographs, International Road Haulage and Licensing of Operators (Amendment) Regulations 2022
1261	The Police, Crime, Sentencing and Courts Act 2022 (Offensive Weapons Homicide Reviews) Regulations 2022
1262	The Armed Forces (Tri-Service Serious Crime Unit) (Consequential Amendments) (No. 2) Regulations 2022
1263	The Armed Forces (Service Court Rules) (Amendment) (No. 2) Rules 2022
1264	The Armed Forces (Court Martial) (Amendment) Rules 2022
1265	The Electricity (Connection Charges) (Amendment) Regulations 2022
1266 (C. 100)	The Environment Act 2021 (Commencement No. 5 and Transitional Provisions) Regulations 2022
1267	The Criminal Legal Aid (Remuneration) (Amendment) (No. 2) Regulations 2022
1268 (W. 258)	The A458 Trunk Road (Broad Street & High Street, Welshpool, Powys) (Temporary Prohibition of Vehicles) (No. 5) Order 2022
1269	The Merchant Shipping (Safety Standards for Passenger Ships on Domestic Voyages) (Miscellaneous Amendments) Regulations 2022
1270 (C. 101)	The Elections Act 2022 (Commencement No. 5 and Savings) Regulations 2022
1271	The Competition Act 1998 (Research and Development Agreements Block Exemption) Order 2022
1272	The Competition Act 1998 (Specialisation Agreements Block Exemption) Order 2022
1273	The Road Vehicles and Non-Road Mobile Machinery (Type-Approval) (Amendment and Transitional Provisions) (EU Exit) Regulations 2022
1274	The Seed (Equivalence) (Amendment) (England) Regulations 2022
1275	The Police and Crime Commissioner Elections (Amendment) Order 2022
1276 (W. 259)	The Seed (Equivalence) (Amendment) (Wales) Regulations 2022
1277 (C. 102)	The Finance Act 2009, Finance (No. 3) Act 2010 and Finance Act 2021 (Value Added Tax) (Interest) (Appointed Days) Regulations 2022
1278 (C. 103)	The Finance Act 2021 (Value Added Tax) (Penalties) (Appointed Day) Regulations 2022
1279	The Organic Production (Amendment) (No. 2) Regulations 2022
1280	The Energy Bill Relief Scheme Pass-through Requirement (Heat Suppliers) (Amendment) Regulations 2022
1281	The Haiti (Sanctions) Regulations 2022
1282 (W. 260)	The A487 Trunk Road (Dyfi Bridge, between Machynlleth and Dolgellau in the Counties of Powys and Gwynedd) (Temporary Traffic Prohibitions) Order 2022
1283	The Customs (Tariff Quotas) (EU Exit) (Amendment) (No. 2) Regulations 2022
1284	The Assistance with Voting for Persons with Disabilities (Principal Area, Parish and Greater London Authority Elections) (Amendments) Rules 2022
1285	The Pensions Act 2004 (Disclosure of Restricted Information by the Pensions Regulator) (Amendment of Specified Persons) Order 2022
1286	Customs (Tariff and Miscellaneous Amendments) Regulations 2022
1287 (C. 104) (W. 261)	The Building Safety Act 2022 (Commencement No. 2) (Wales) Regulations 2022
1288	The Van Benefit and Car and Van Fuel Benefit Order 2022
1289	The Air Navigation (Dangerous Goods) (Amendment) Regulations 2022
1290	The Charities Act 2006 (Principal Regulators of Exempt Charities) (Amendment) Regulations 2022
1291	The Biocidal Products (Health and Safety) (Amendment) Regulations 2022
1292	The Air Quality (Designation of Relevant Public Authorities) (England) Regulations 2022
1293	The Persistent Organic Pollutants (Amendment) (EU Exit) Regulations 2022
1294	The Free Zone (Customs Site No. 1 Liverpool) Designation Order 2022
1295	The Investigatory Powers (Covert Human Intelligence Sources and Interception: Codes of Practice) Regulations 2022
1296	The Northern Ireland (Extension of Period for Making Ministerial Appointments) Regulations 2022
1297	The Markets in Financial Instruments (Investor Reporting) (Amendment) Regulations 2022
1298	The Finance Act 2009, Sections 101 and 102 (Value Added Tax) (Late Payment Interest and Repayment Interest) (Exceptions and Consequential Amendments) Order 2022
1299	The Investigatory Powers Commissioner (Oversight Functions) Regulations 2022
1300	The Export Control (Amendment) (EU Exit) Regulations 2022
1301	The Customs (Tariff and Miscellaneous Amendments) Regulations 2022
1302	The Water Abstraction (Transitional Provisions) (Amendment) (England) Regulations 2022
1303	The Trade Marks (Amendment) Regulations 2022
1304	The Prevention and Reduction of Serious Violence (Strategies etc.) Regulations 2022
1305 (W. 262)	The Water Resources (Control of Agricultural Pollution) (Wales) (Amendment) Regulations 2022
1306	The Internal Market Information System Regulation (Amendment etc.) Regulations 2022
1307 (W. 263)	The Non-Domestic Rating (Persons Required to Supply Information and Service of Notices) (Wales) Regulations 2022
1308 (C. 105)	The Telecommunications Infrastructure (Leasehold Property) Act 2021 (Commencement No. 1) Regulations 2022
1309	The Assistance with Voting for Persons with Disabilities (Amendments) Regulations 2022
1310	The Wireless Telegraphy (Licence Charges) (Amendment) Regulations 2022
1311	The Communications Act 2003 (Restrictions on the Advertising of Less Healthy Food) (Effective Date) (Amendment) Regulations 2022
1312	The Customs (Miscellaneous Amendments) (No. 2) Regulations 2022
1313	The Aviation Security (Amendment) (No. 2) Regulations 2022
1314 (W. 264)	The National Health Service (Pharmaceutical Services) (Wales) (Amendment) Regulations 2022
1315	The Animals and Animal Health, Feed and Food, Plants and Plant Health (Amendment) Regulations 2022
1316 (W. 265)	The Landfill Disposals Tax (Tax Rates) (Wales) (Amendment) Regulations 2022
1317 (W. 266)	The Official Controls (Extension of Transitional Periods) (Amendment) (Wales) Regulations 2022
1318 (W. 267) (C. 106)	The Tertiary Education and Research (Wales) Act 2022 (Commencement No. 1) Order 2022
1319	The Government Resources and Accounts Act 2000 (Estimates and Accounts) (Amendment) Order 2022
1320	The Air Navigation (Restriction of Flying) (Scampton) (Restricted Zone EG R313) (Amendment) Regulations 2022
1321	The Finance Act 2022, Schedule 10 (Public Interest Business Protection Tax) (Substitution of Date) Regulations 2022
1322	The Trade in Animals and Related Products (Amendment and Legislative Functions) Regulations 2022
1323	The Telecommunications Infrastructure (Leasehold Property) (Terms of Agreement) Regulations 2022
1324	The Prescribed Persons (Reports on Disclosures of Information) (Amendment) Regulations 2022
1325	The Whole of Government Accounts (Designation of Bodies) (No. 2) Order 2022
1326	The Eligibility and Registration of General Practitioners and Specialist Medical Practitioners (Amendment) Order of Council 2022
1327 (W. 268)	The Processed Cereal-based Foods and Baby Foods for Infants and Young Children (Wales) (Amendment) Regulations 2022
1328	The Local Authorities (Capital Finance and Accounting) (England) (Amendment) (No. 2) Regulations 2022
1329	The Social Security (Class 2 National Insurance Contributions Increase of Threshold) Regulations 2022
1330 (W. 269)	The Official Controls (Import of High-Risk Food and Feed of Non-Animal Origin) (Amendment of Commission Implementing Regulation (EU) 2019/1793) (Wales) Regulations 2022
1331	The Russia (Sanctions) (EU Exit) (Amendment) (No. 17) Regulations 2022
1332	The Extraterritorial US Legislation (Sanctions against Cuba, Iran and Libya) (Protection of Trading Interests) (Amendment) (EU Exit) Regulations 2022
1333 (W. 270)	The Marketing of Seeds and Plant Propagating Material (Wales) (Amendment) (EU Exit) (No. 2) Regulations 2022
1334	The Merchant Shipping (Control of Harmful Anti-Fouling Systems on Ships) Order 2022
1335	The Education (Student Loans) (Repayment) (Amendment) (No. 4) Regulations 2022
1336	The Greenhouse Gas Emissions Trading Scheme (Amendment) (No. 3) Order 2022
1337	The Plant Varieties and Seeds (Isle of Man) (Amendment) Order 2022
1338	The Russia (Sanctions) (Overseas Territories) (Amendment) (No. 4) Order 2022
1339	The Republic of Belarus (Sanctions) (Overseas Territories) (Amendment) Order 2022
1340	The Haiti (Sanctions) (Isle of Man) Order 2022
1341	The Apprenticeships (Miscellaneous Provisions) (England) (Amendment) (No. 3) Regulations 2022
1342	The Merchant Shipping (Standards of Training, Certification and Watchkeeping) Regulations 2022
1343	The Designation of Rural Primary Schools (England) Order 2022
1344	The Inter-American Investment Corporation (Immunities and Privileges) Order 2022
1345	The Short-term Holding Facility (Amendment) Rules 2022
1346	The Conformity Assessment (Mutual Recognition Agreements) (Amendment) Regulations 2022
1347	The Haiti (Sanctions) (Overseas Territories) Order 2022
1348 (W. 271)	The Trade in Animals and Related Products (Amendment and Legislative Functions) and Animal Health (Miscellaneous Amendments) (Wales) (EU Exit) Regulations 2022
1349 (C. 107)	The Skills and Post-16 Education Act 2022 (Commencement No. 2) (England) Regulations 2022
1350 (W. 272)	The Non-Domestic Rating (Chargeable Amounts) (Wales) Regulations 2022
1351	The Food and Feed (Miscellaneous Amendments) Regulations 2022
1352	The Local Authorities (Mayoral Elections) (England and Wales) (Amendment) Regulations 2022
1353	The Combined Authorities (Mayoral Elections) (Amendment) Order 2022
1354	The Police and Crime Commissioner Elections and Welsh Forms (Amendment) Order 2022
1355	The Proceeds of Crime (Money Laundering) (Threshold Amount) Order 2022
1356	The Agricultural Holdings (Fee) Regulations 2022
1357	The Lancaster (Electoral Changes) Order 2022
1358 (C. 108)	The Judicial Review and Courts Act 2022 (Commencement No. 2) Regulations 2022
1359	The Subsidy Control Act 2022 (Commencement) Regulations 2022
1360	The Parliamentary Works Sponsor Body (Abolition) Regulations 2022
1361	The Road Vehicle Carbon Dioxide Emission Performance Standards (Cars, Vans and Heavy Duty Vehicles) (Amendment) Regulations 2022
1362 (W. 273)	The Food and Feed (Miscellaneous Amendments) (Wales) (EU Exit) Regulations 2022
1363 (W. 274)	The A470 Trunk Road (Pontypridd, Rhondda Cynon Taf) (Temporary 50 mph Speed Limit) Order 2022
1364	The Rushcliffe (Electoral Changes) Order 2022
1365	The Liverpool (Electoral Changes) Order 2022
1366	The Blaby (Electoral Changes) Order 2022
1367	The Plant Health and Trade in Animals and Related Products (Amendment) Regulations 2022
1368	The Telford & Wrekin (Electoral Changes) Order 2022
1369	The Chesterfield (Electoral Changes) Order 2022
1370	The Criminal Legal Aid (General) (Amendment) Regulations 2022
1371	The Allocation of Housing and Homelessness (Eligibility) (England) and Persons Subject to Immigration Control (Housing Authority Accommodation and Homelessness) (Amendment) (No. 4) Regulations 2022
1372	The Wigan (Electoral Changes) Order 2022
1373	The Blackpool (Electoral Changes) Order 2022
1374	The Official Controls (Extension of Transitional Periods) (Amendment) (England) Regulations 2022
1375	The Trafford (Electoral Changes) Order 2022
1376	The Legal Aid (Financial Resources and Contribution Orders) (Amendment) Regulations 2022
1377	The International Development Association (Twentieth Replenishment) Order 2022
1378	The Health and Safety and Nuclear (Fees) Regulations 2022
1379	The Civil Legal Aid (Immigration Interviews (Exceptions) and Remuneration) (Amendment) Regulations 2022
1380	The Transport and Works (Guided Transport Modes) (Amendment) Order 2022
1381	The Communications Act 2003 (Restrictions on the Advertising of Less Healthy Food) (Effective Date) (Amendment) (No. 2) Regulations 2022
1382	The Voter Identification Regulations 2022
1383	The Restriction of Hazardous Substances in Electrical and Electronic Equipment (Exemptions) (Fees) Regulations 2022
1384 (C. 109)	The Professional Qualifications Act 2022 (Commencement No. 2) Regulations 2022
1385 (W. 275)	The A40 Trunk Road (St Clears to Carmarthen, Carmarthenshire) (Temporary Traffic Prohibitions) Order 2022
1386 (W. 276)	The A48 Trunk Road (Earlswood Junction to Briton Ferry Roundabout, Neath Port Talbot) (Temporary Prohibition of Vehicles) Order 2022
1387	The A453 Trunk Road (Mill Hill Roundabout) (Detrunking) Order 2022
1388	The Architects (Fees, Electronic Communications and Miscellaneous Amendments) Regulations 2022
1389	The Register of Overseas Entities (Verification and Provision of Information) (Amendment) Regulations 2022
1390	The Public Contracts (Amendment) Regulations 2022
1391	The Immigration Skills Charge (Amendment) Regulations 2022
1392	The Education (Student Loans) (Repayment) (Amendment) (No. 5) Regulations 2022
1393	The Product Safety and Metrology (Amendment and Transitional Provisions) Regulations 2022
1394	The Immigration (Persons Designated under Sanctions Regulations) (EU Exit) (Amendment) Regulations 2022
1395	The Investigatory Powers (Communications Data) (Relevant Public Authorities and Designated Senior Officers) Regulations 2022
1396	The Keadby 3 (Carbon Capture Equipped Gas Fired Generating Station) Order 2022
1397	The Voter Identification (Principal Area, Parish and Greater London Authority Elections) (Amendment) Rules 2022
1398	The East Anglia ONE North Offshore Wind Farm (Correction) Order 2022
1399	The East Anglia TWO Offshore Wind Farm (Correction) Order 2022
1400	The East Anglia TWO Offshore Wind Farm (Correction) Order 2022
1401 (C. 110)	The Elections Act 2022 (Commencement No. 6 and Savings) Regulations 2022
1402	The Parliamentary Elections (Welsh Forms) (Amendment) Order 2022
1403	The Non-Domestic Rating (Chargeable Amounts) (England) Regulations 2022
1404 (W. 277)	The A487 & A40 Trunk Roads (Fishguard, Pembrokeshire) (Temporary Prohibition of Vehicles) Order 2022
1405	The Recall Petition (Welsh Forms) Order 2022
1406	The Network Rail (Cambridge South Infrastructure Enhancements) Order 2022
