= Labour Party (UK) election results (1929–1945) =

This article lists the Labour Party's election results from the 1929 United Kingdom general election until 1945, including by-elections.

All candidates were sponsored, in some cases by the Divisional Labour Party (noted as "Constituency").

== Summary of general election performance ==
Year	Number of candidates	Total votes	Average votes per candidate	% UK vote	Change (percentage points)	Lost deposits	Number of MPs
1929	569	8,048,968	14,146	37.1	+12.5	35	287
1931	490	6,081,826	12,412	29.4	-7.7	21	46
1935	552	7,984,988	14,466	38.0	+8.6	16	154

== Sponsorship of candidates ==
Sponsor	Candidates 29	MPs 29	Candidates 31	MPs 31	Candidates 35	MPs 35
CLP	364	128	315	13	398	66
Co-op	12	9	15	1	21	9
ILP	54	36	23	0	N/A	N/A
SSP	N/A	N/A	N/A	N/A	4	0
Trade union	139	115	138	32	129	79

== Election results ==
=== 1929 general election ===
Constituency	Candidate	Votes	%	Position	Sponsor
Aberavon	William Cove	22,194	55.9	1	Constituency
Aberdare	George Hall	29,550	64.6	1	Miners
Aberdeen North	William Wedgwood Benn	17,826	60.8	1	ILP
Aberdeen South	William Martin	13,868	39.2	2	ILP
Abertillery	George Daggar	20,175	64.5	1	Miners
Abingdon	Arthur Reade	3,712	12.5	3	Constituency
Accrington	Tom Snowden	25,336	52.3	1	Constituency
Acton	James Shillaker	13,206	41.4	1	Constituency
Aldershot	J. R. McPhie	4,389	17.2	3	Constituency
Altrincham	Alfred Dobbs	9,242	16.4	3	Boot & Shoe
Anglesey	William Edwards	7,563	28.4	2	Constituency
Argyllshire	John L. Kinloch	6,001	23.8	3	ILP
Ashford	Mont Follick	3,885	11.4	3	Constituency
Ashton-under-Lyne	Albert Bellamy	13,170	44.4	1	Railwaymen
Aylesbury	F. G. Temple	4,509	10.6	3	Constituency
Ayr Burghs	Clarice Shaw	13,429	36.5	2	ILP
Balham and Tooting	Charles Wortham Brook	13,499	33.6	2	Constituency
Banbury	Lawrence A. Wingfield	5,894	16.3	3	Constituency
Banffshire	Alasdair Alpin MacGregor	4,982	23.7	3	Constituency
Barkston Ash	George Woods	18,321	47.7	2	Co-op
Barnard Castle	Will Lawther	9,281	42.0	1	Miners
Barnsley	John Potts	21,855	53.8	1	Miners
Barnstaple	Donald Evan Mullins	3,864	10.2	3	Constituency
Barrow-in-Furness	John Bromley	19,798	56.0	1	Locomotive Engineers
Basingstoke	W. J. Beck	4,650	14.2	3	Constituency
Bassetlaw	Malcolm MacDonald	23,681	58.7	1	Constituency
Bath	George Gilbert Desmond	8,769	23.0	3	Constituency
Batley and Morley	Ben Turner	24,621	58.3	1	Textile Workers
Battersea North	William Sanders	13,265	37.8	1	Constituency
Battersea South	William Bennett	18,113	43.9	1	Constituency
Bedford	George Dixon	9,147	25.1	3	Constituency
Bedwellty	Charles Edwards	26,021	79.0	1	Miners
Belper	Jack Lees	15,958	43.0	1	ILP
Bermondsey West	Alfred Salter	13,231	60.2	1	Constituency
Berwick and Haddington	George Sinkinson	11,761	37.5	1	Constituency
Berwick-upon-Tweed	Henry Kegie	5,402	18.4	2	Railwaymen
Bethnal Green North East	Walter Windsor	11,101	44.9	2	General & Municipal Workers
Bethnal Green South West	Christopher John Kelly	6,849	38.7	2	Railwaymen
Bewdley	Sardius Hancock	2,575	09.8	3	Constituency
Bilston	John Baker	18,679	50.8	1	Iron & Steel
Birkenhead East	James Coulthard	11,654	31.8	3	ILP
Birkenhead West	William Henry Egan	16,634	47.5	1	Boilermakers
Birmingham Aston	John Strachey	18,672	52.2	1	Constituency
Birmingham Deritend	Fred Longden	16,932	50.7	1	Co-op
Birmingham Duddeston	George Francis Sawyer	18,204	61.0	1	Constituency
Birmingham Edgbaston	William Henry Dashwood Caple	8,590	23.4	2	Constituency
Birmingham Erdington	Charles Simmons	20,665	43.4	1	ILP
Birmingham Handsworth	Louis Anderson Fenn	11,969	29.3	2	Constituency
Birmingham King's Norton	Robert Dennison	13,973	40.6	2	Iron & Steel
Birmingham Ladywood	Wilfrid Whiteley	16,447	50.0	1	ILP
Birmingham Moseley	Frank George Bushnell	15,733	26.4	2	Constituency
Birmingham Sparkbrook	A. Young	12,875	37.4	2	Constituency
Birmingham West	George Willey	16,819	49.9	2	Constituency
Birmingham Yardley	Archibald Gossling	23,956	48.8	1	Woodworkers
Bishop Auckland	Hugh Dalton	17,838	55.8	1	Constituency
Blackburn	Mary Hamilton	37,256	26.1	1	ILP
Blackburn	Thomas Gill	35,723	25.0	2	Railway Clerks
Blackpool	Ernest Alfred Machin	12,049	17.1	3	Constituency
Blaydon	William Whiteley	21,221	59.1	1	Miners
Bodmin	Paul Reed	3,437	10.0	3	Constituency
Bolton	Albert Law	43,520	24.0	1	Textile Factory Workers
Bolton	Michael Brothers	37,888	20.9	2	Textile Factory Workers
Bootle	John Kinley	15,294	43.6	1	Constituency
Bosworth	John Minto	15,244	37.0	2	Constituency
Bothwell	Joseph Sullivan	17,006	55.3	1	Miners
Bournemouth	Maurice Spencer	7,900	15.9	3	Constituency
Bow and Bromley	George Lansbury	20,119	69.4	1	Constituency
Bradford Central	William Leach	24,876	59.0	1	ILP
Bradford East	Fred Jowett	21,398	54.7	1	ILP
Bradford North	Norman Angell	17,873	41.0	1	Constituency
Bradford South	William Hirst	23,251	48.9	1	Co-op
Brecon and Radnor	Peter Freeman	14,511	33.7	1	Constituency
Brentford and Chiswick	Stella Churchill	10,918	37.8	2	Constituency
Bridgwater	James Musgrave Boltz	6,423	19.4	3	Constituency
Brigg	David Quibell	16,117	45.2	1	Constituency
Brighton	L. S. Cheshire	19,494	12.2	3	Constituency
Brighton	William McLaine	18,770	11.8	4	Constituency
Bristol Central	Joseph Alpass	20,749	55.7	1	Constituency
Bristol East	Walter Baker	24,197	65.8	1	Post Office Workers
Bristol North	Walter Ayles	18,619	48.7	1	Constituency
Bristol South	Alexander Walkden	23,591	56.5	1	Railway Clerks
Bristol West	Clare Annesley	11,961	25.3	2	Constituency
Brixton	A. B. Bishop	10,089	31.7	2	Constituency
Bromley	Albert Edwin Ashworth	10,105	18.7	3	Constituency
Broxtowe	Seymour Cocks	24,603	59.2	1	Constituency
Buckingham	James Lievsley George	11,718	32.7	2	Constituency
Buckrose	Harold H. Vickers	1,766	05.6	3	Constituency
Burnley	Arthur Henderson	28,091	46.2	1	Foundry Workers
Burslem	Andrew MacLaren	20,288	58.7	1	Constituency
Burton	William Paling	10,511	30.3	2	Constituency
Bury	James Bell	13,175	37.4	2	Textile Factory Workers
Bury St Edmunds	Percy Austins	2,490	08.2	3	Constituency
Bute and Northern Ayrshire	Alexander Sloan	14,294	43.8	2	ILP
Caernarvon Boroughs	Thomas Ap Rhys	4,536	15.8	3	Constituency
Caernarvonshire	Robert Jones	14,867	38.5	2	Transport & General
Caerphilly	Morgan Jones	21,248	57.9	1	Constituency
Camberwell North	Charles Ammon	13,051	57.9	1	Post Office Workers
Camberwell North West	Hyacinth Morgan	12,213	44.2	1	Constituency
Camborne	H. J. Sharman	7,870	25.3	3	Constituency
Cambridge University	Alexander Wood	1,463	09.2	4	University Party
Cambridge	David Hardman	10,116	31.5	2	Constituency
Cambridgeshire	Geoffrey Garratt	11,256	31.7	2	Constituency
Cannock	William Anderson	26,388	54.2	1	Workers
Canterbury	Philip Sidney Eastman	4,706	13.9	3	Constituency
Cardiff Central	Ernest Bennett	14,469	39.1	1	Constituency
Cardiff East	James Ewart Edmunds	12,813	39.0	1	Transport & General
Cardiff South	Arthur Henderson Jr.	13,686	45.3	1	Constituency
Carlisle	George Middleton	12,779	40.4	1	Post Office Workers
Carmarthen	Daniel Hopkin	15,130	38.2	1	Constituency
Central Aberdeenshire	Arthur Fraser Macintosh	4,357	17.7	3	Constituency
Chatham	Frank Markham	13,007	42.6	1	Constituency
Chelmsford	Nils Henry Moller	8,910	22.8	3	Constituency
Chelsea	Alfred George Prichard	6,645	25.1	2	Constituency
Cheltenham	William Ramsey Piggott	4,920	17.1	3	Constituency
Chester	W. Herron	5,846	17.9	3	Constituency
Chesterfield	George Benson	20,296	54.1	1	Constituency
Chester-le-Street	Jack Lawson	26,975	69.8	1	Miners
Chippenham	William Robert Robins	3,717	12.8	3	Constituency
Chislehurst	James Lamb Thomson	5,445	17.4	3	Constituency
Chorley	William Taylor	18,369	42.4	2	Blacksmiths
Cirencester and Tewkesbury	E. W. Fredman	6,987	19.8	3	Constituency
Clackmannan and Eastern Stirlingshire	Lauchlin MacNeill Weir	17,667	53.2	1	ILP
Clapham	J. Allen Skinner	9,871	30.5	2	ILP
Clay Cross	Charles Duncan	24,480	80.2	1	Workers
Cleveland	William Mansfield	16,938	36.3	1	Miners
Clitheroe	William Dobbie	15,592	39.5	2	Railwaymen
Coatbridge	James C. Welsh	16,879	55.0	1	Constituency
Colchester	Richard Leopold Reiss	12,809	38.5	2	Constituency
Colne Valley	Philip Snowden	21,667	48.3	1	Constituency
Combined Scottish Universities	James Kerr	2,691	10.7	4	University Party
Consett	Herbert Dunnico	22,256	56.5	1	Constituency
Coventry	Philip Noel-Baker	34,255	49.4	1	Constituency
Crewe	John William Bowen	20,948	50.2	1	Post Office Workers
Croydon North	Gilbert Foan	13,852	26.5	2	Constituency
Croydon South	Ernest Wesley Wilton	13,793	29.2	2	Constituency
Darlington	Arthur Lewis Shepherd	17,061	44.0	1	Constituency
Dartford	John Edmund Mills	26,871	50.6	1	Engineering
Darwen	Thomas Ramsden	7,504	19.5	3	Constituency
Deptford	C. W. Bowerman	26,848	55.2	1	Compositors
Derby	J. H. Thomas	39,688	30.0	1	Railwaymen
Derby	William Robert Raynes	36,237	27.4	2	Constituency
Devizes	R. P. Sheppard	2,391	09.5	3	Constituency
Dewsbury	Benjamin Riley	14,420	46.2	1	Constituency
Don Valley	Tom Williams	31,466	73.3	1	Miners
Doncaster	Wilfred Paling	25,295	56.0	1	Miners
Dover	Ernest Lionel McKeag	7,646	23.6	2	Constituency
Dudley	Oliver Baldwin	13,551	47.6	1	Constituency
Dulwich	C. A. Smith	9,309	30.3	2	Constituency
Dumbarton Burghs	David Kirkwood	19,193	63.1	1	Engineering
Dumfriesshire	William Hutton Marwick	6,687	18.7	3	ILP
Dunbartonshire	Willie Brooke	18,153	45.7	1	Dyers
Dundee	Michael Marcus	47,602	27.7	2	Constituency
Dunfermline Burghs	William McLean Watson	15,288	58.5	1	Miners
Durham	Joshua Ritson	18,514	56.8	1	Miners
Ealing	James William Maycock	9,093	24.2	2	Constituency
East Aberdeenshire	J. E. Hamilton	10,110	43.1	2	Constituency
Eastbourne	Richard Spencer Chatfield	8,204	22.5	2	Constituency
East Dorset	Edward Joseph Stocker	6,819	16.2	3	Constituency
East Fife	William Ross Garson	5,350	16.0	3	Constituency
East Grinstead	Thomas Crawford	6,265	16.5	3	Constituency
East Ham North	Susan Lawrence	13,969	42.1	1	Constituency
East Ham South	Alfred Barnes	18,956	54.3	1	Co-op
East Norfolk	Bill Holmes	7,856	23.4	3	Constituency
East Renfrewshire	John Martin Munro	16,924	47.8	2	ILP
East Surrey	Robert Oscar Mennell	5,152	16.0	3	Constituency
Ebbw Vale	Aneurin Bevan	20,088	60.3	1	Miners
Eccles	David Mort	20,489	49.8	1	Iron & Steel
Edinburgh Central	William Graham	16,762	59.0	1	ILP
Edinburgh East	Drummond Shiels	13,933	47.2	1	Constituency
Edinburgh North	Eleanor Stewart	11,340	32.2	2	Constituency
Edinburgh South	Arthur Woodburn	5,050	14.7	2	Constituency
Edinburgh West	George Mathers	15,795	38.6	1	Railway Clerks
Edmonton	Francis Alfred Broad	17,555	59.3	1	Engineering
Elland	Charles Roden Buxton	17,012	43.7	1	Constituency
Enfield	William Henderson	14,427	43.3	1	Constituency
Epping	Walton Newbold	6,472	13.1	3	Constituency
Epsom	Stanley Morgan	7,662	17.9	3	Constituency
Evesham	Robert Aldington	4,138	13.6	3	Constituency
Exeter	J. Lloyd Jones	9,361	27.8	2	Constituency
Eye	Owen Aves	4,709	14.9	3	Constituency
Fareham	Arthur James Pearson	8,034	22.1	3	Constituency
Farnham	Francis Noel Palmer	4,866	13.8	3	Constituency
Farnworth	Guy Rowson	21,857	52.2	1	Miners
Faversham	Dudley Aman	15,275	38.9	2	Constituency
Finchley	J. George Stone	5,824	15.0	3	Constituency
Finsbury	George Gillett	17,970	56.5	1	Constituency
Flintshire	Cyril Oswald Jones	12,310	22.0	3	Constituency
Forest of Dean	David Vaughan	13,976	52.1	1	Constituency
Forfarshire	Charles Gallie	5,257	25.0	3	Railway Clerks
Frome	Frederick Gould	18,524	45.5	1	Boot & Shoe
Fulham East	John Palmer	13,425	39.4	2	Constituency
Fulham West	Ernest Spero	16,190	44.9	1	Constituency
Fylde	Joseph Williamson	16,318	35.3	2	ILP
Gainsborough	George Deer	7,032	26.0	3	Constituency
Galloway	Hector McNeill	4,903	15.5	3	ILP
Gateshead	James Melville	28,393	52.6	1	Constituency
Gillingham	George Pearce Blizard	11,207	39.1	2	Constituency
Glasgow Bridgeton	James Maxton	21,033	67.7	1	ILP
Glasgow Camlachie	Campbell Stephen	17,946	53.2	1	ILP
Glasgow Cathcart	John Primrose Hay	12,983	36.3	2	ILP
Glasgow Central	Craigie Aitchison	17,663	49.1	2	Constituency
Glasgow Gorbals	George Buchanan	25,134	74.8	1	Patternmakers
Glasgow Hillhead	William Sloan Cormack	10,065	36.7	2	ILP
Glasgow Kelvingrove	John Winning	15,173	43.6	2	ILP
Glasgow Maryhill	John Clarke	18,311	50.6	1	ILP
Glasgow Partick	Adam McKinlay	13,110	45.5	1	Woodworkers
Glasgow Pollok	Walter Muter	9,936	30.8	2	Constituency
Glasgow Shettleston	John Wheatley	19,594	60.4	1	ILP
Glasgow Springburn	George Hardie	21,079	65.5	1	ILP
Glasgow St Rollox	James Stewart	19,445	61.8	1	ILP
Glasgow Tradeston	Tom Henderson	17,864	58.7	1	Co-op
Gloucester	Henry Nixon	10,548	37.4	2	Blastfurnacemen
Gower	David Rhys Grenfell	20,664	54.0	1	Miners
Grantham	Montague William Moore	11,340	28.7	3	Constituency
Gravesend	William James Humphreys	12,871	40.6	2	Transport & General
Great Yarmouth	George Johnson	5,347	17.8	3	Constituency
Greenock	William Leonard	9,697	28.2	2	Co-op
Greenwich	Edward Timothy Palmer	20,328	46.3	1	Prudential Staff
Grimsby	Ernest Marklew	22,254	45.2	2	Constituency
Guildford	Laurence Miles Worsnop	5,966	14.1	3	Constituency
Hackney Central	Frederick Charles Watkins	12,462	37.3	1	Railway Clerks
Hackney North	Frank Bowles	10,333	32.9	2	Constituency
Hackney South	Herbert Morrison	15,590	51.2	1	Constituency
Halifax	Arthur Longbottom	23,776	42.2	1	Constituency
Hamilton	Duncan Graham	16,595	67.1	1	Miners
Hammersmith North	James Patrick Gardner	17,601	56.2	1	Furnishing Trades
Hammersmith South	Daniel Chater	12,630	43.8	1	Co-op
Hampstead	F. E. Dawkins	8,473	21.1	2	Constituency
Hanley	Arthur Hollins	20,785	62.0	1	Pottery Workers
Harborough	Frederick Wise	12,620	32.7	2	Constituency
Harrow	Hubert Beaumont	15,684	29.8	2	Constituency
Hastings	Basil Noble	6,516	21.4	3	Constituency
Hemel Hempstead	Albert E. R. Millar	3,624	11.9	3	Constituency
Hemsworth	John Guest	26,075	79.9	1	Miners
Hendon	Robert Lyons	15,434	25.5	2	Constituency
Henley	Bernard Benjamin Gillis	5,962	18.2	3	Constituency
Hereford	Henry Cooper	1,901	06.5	3	Constituency
Hertford	Roger S. Edwards	4,193	12.2	4	Constituency
Hexham	Ernest Owen Dunnico	8,135	28.7	3	Constituency
Heywood and Radcliffe	Arthur Creech Jones	20,745	47.8	2	Transport & General
High Peak	George Bagnall	10,567	27.8	3	Constituency
Hitchin	Richard W. Gifford	8,880	26.9	3	Constituency
Holborn	Fitzroy William Hickinbottom	4,530	25.5	2	Constituency
Holderness	Joseph William Hewitt	2,481	08.1	3	Constituency
Holland with Boston	Charles Edward Snook	9,556	21.1	3	Constituency
Honiton	Rose Davies	915	02.6	3	Constituency
Horncastle	J. R. Sanderson	3,683	13.8	3	Constituency
Hornsey	Francis Henry Wiltshire	8,529	17.0	3	Constituency
Horsham and Worthing	Helen Keynes	7,611	16.4	3	Constituency
Houghton-le-Spring	Robert Richardson	25,056	57.1	1	Miners
Huddersfield	James Hudson	25,966	38.3	1	ILP
Huntingdonshire	Charles Giddins	3,493	12.3	3	Constituency
Hythe	Grace Colman	2,597	11.5	3	Constituency
Ilford	Charles Robin de Gruchy	8,922	21.9	3	Constituency
Ilkeston	George Oliver	20,202	59.0	1	Workers
Ince	Gordon Macdonald	26,091	73.8	1	Miners
Inverness	David Norman Mackay	11,369	44.7	2	Constituency
Ipswich	Robert Jackson	17,592	37.7	2	Constituency
Isle of Ely	Dermot Freyer	6,967	19.0	3	Constituency
Isle of Thanet	Edgar J. Plaisted	4,490	10.5	3	Constituency
Isle of Wight	Henry Edward Weaver	6,256	13.7	3	Constituency
Islington East	Ethel Bentham	15,199	38.0	1	Constituency
Islington North	Robert Young	18,272	41.8	1	Constituency
Islington South	William Cluse	13,737	46.6	1	Constituency
Islington West	Frederick Montague	13,768	55.2	1	Constituency
Jarrow	Robert John Wilson	22,751	62.5	1	Distributive Workers
Keighley	Hastings Lees-Smith	18,412	44.7	1	ILP
Kennington	Leonard Matters	15,477	55.7	1	Constituency
Kensington North	Fielding West	19,701	48.4	1	Constituency
Kettering	Samuel Perry	18,253	43.8	1	Co-op
Kidderminster	Frank G. Lloyd	12,246	27.3	2	Constituency
Kilmarnock	Robert Climie	17,368	48.2	1	ILP
King's Lynn	John Maynard	10,356	29.0	3	Constituency
Kingston upon Hull Central	Joseph Kenworthy	18,815	54.1	1	Constituency
Kingston upon Hull East	George Muff	20,023	48.8	1	Constituency
Kingston upon Hull North West	William Pickles	10,700	30.1	2	Painters and Decorators
Kingston upon Hull South West	John Arnott	14,903	41.2	1	ILP
Kingston-upon-Thames	John William Fawcett	8,903	23.1	2	Constituency
Kingswinford	Charles Henry Sitch	22,479	53.2	1	Chain Makers
Kinross and Western Perthshire	W. D. Stewart	3,834	15.2	3	Constituency
Kirkcaldy Burghs	Tom Kennedy	17,410	59.6	1	Constituency
Lambeth North	George Strauss	11,264	43.8	1	Constituency
Lanark	Thomas Scott Dickson	15,054	48.7	1	Constituency
Lancaster	Reginald Penrith Burnett	9,903	22.4	3	Constituency
Leeds Central	Richard Denman	17,322	44.6	1	Constituency
Leeds North	Thomas McCall	11,180	27.4	2	Constituency
Leeds North East	David Freeman	13,050	32.5	2	Constituency
Leeds South	Henry Charleton	18,043	52.5	1	Railwaymen
Leeds South East	Henry Slesser	22,403	75.2	1	Constituency
Leeds West	Thomas Stamford	18,765	47.2	1	ILP
Leek	William Bromfield	22,458	58.5	1	Constituency
Leicester East	Edward Frank Wise	22,533	50.8	1	ILP
Leicester South	Herbert Brough Usher	16,198	37.4	2	Constituency
Leicester West	Frederick Pethick-Lawrence	22,635	55.3	1	Constituency
Leigh	Joe Tinker	25,635	57.0	1	Miners
Leith	Alan H. Paton	15,715	43.3	2	Constituency
Lewes	Alban Gordon	7,698	27.1	2	Constituency
Lewisham East	John Wilmot	22,806	41.7	2	Constituency
Lewisham West	Catherine Mary Wadham	10,958	25.9	2	Constituency
Leyton East	Fenner Brockway	11,111	42.9	1	ILP
Leyton West	Reginald Sorensen	14,339	42.1	1	Constituency
Lichfield	James Lovat-Fraser	14,965	42.6	1	Constituency
Limehouse	Clement Attlee	13,872	55.9	1	Constituency
Lincoln	Robert Arthur Taylor	15,176	43.5	1	Constituency
Linlithgowshire	Manny Shinwell	18,063	51.6	1	ILP
Liverpool East Toxteth	Joseph Cleary	9,904	26.9	2	Constituency
Liverpool Edge Hill	Jack Hayes	17,650	55.4	1	Constituency
Liverpool Everton	Derwent Hall Caine	14,234	52.9	1	Constituency
Liverpool Exchange	William Albert Robinson	16,970	49.7	2	Distributive Workers
Liverpool Fairfield	John Hamer Sutcliffe	14,614	47.1	2	Constituency
Liverpool Kirkdale	Elijah Sandham	15,222	51.3	1	ILP
Liverpool Walton	F. A. P. Rowe	16,395	42.2	2	Constituency
Liverpool Wavertree	Samuel Lewis Treleaven	13,585	32.2	2	Constituency
Liverpool West Derby	William Harvey Moore	14,124	36.0	2	Constituency
Liverpool West Toxteth	Joseph Gibbins	19,988	55.1	1	Boilermakers
Llandaff and Barry	Charles Lloyd	21,468	40.8	1	Constituency
Llanelly	John Henry Williams	28,595	55.4	1	Constituency
Lonsdale	Joseph Henderson	7,303	25.4	3	Railwaymen
Loughborough	George Ernest Winterton	14,854	40.0	1	Constituency
Louth	T. Holmes	4,027	12.7	3	Constituency
Lowestoft	Basil Hall	9,903	28.9	3	Constituency
Ludlow	Thomas Hardwick	5,323	21.6	2	Constituency
Luton	Florence Harrison Bell	7,351	16.5	3	Constituency
Macclesfield	John Williams	13,911	30.2	2	General & Municipal Workers
Maidstone	John Morgan	10,419	29.9	2	Constituency
Maldon	Herbert Evans	11,224	35.1	2	Constituency
Manchester Ardwick	Thomas Lowth	20,041	60.3	1	Railwaymen
Manchester Blackley	Wilfrid Burke	9,091	30.1	3	Distributive Workers
Manchester Clayton	John Edward Sutton	21,103	55.0	1	Miners
Manchester Exchange	Abraham Moss	9,300	27.3	3	Constituency
Manchester Gorton	Joseph Compton	22,056	61.1	1	Vehicle Builders
Manchester Hulme	Andrew McElwee	15,053	43.8	1	Woodworkers
Manchester Moss Side	A. A. Purcell	9,522	32.5	2	Constituency
Manchester Platting	J. R. Clynes	22,969	57.9	1	General & Municipal Workers
Manchester Rusholme	Jerrold Adshead	8,080	24.3	3	Constituency
Manchester Withington	Joseph Robinson	7,853	16.4	3	Constituency
Mansfield	Charles Brown	28,416	58.5	1	Constituency
Melton	A. E. Stubbs	6,569	16.7	3	Constituency
Merioneth	John Jones Roberts	7,980	32.5	2	Constituency
Merthyr	R. C. Wallhead	22,701	59.6	1	ILP
Mid Bedfordshire	Henry William Fenner	3,853	12.4	3	Constituency
Middlesbrough East	Ellen Wilkinson	12,215	41.3	1	Distributive Workers
Middlesbrough West	Alonzo Ralph Ellis	13,328	36.9	2	Transport & General
Middleton and Prestwich	Matthew Burrow Farr	14,368	34.6	2	Textile Factory Workers
Midlothian and Peebles Northern	Andrew Clarke	10,779	37.5	2	Miners
Mile End	John Scurr	11,489	47.1	1	Constituency
Mitcham	Skene Mackay	13,057	30.8	2	Constituency
Monmouth	Luke Bateman	8,268	24.9	3	Constituency
Montgomeryshire	John Evans	4,069	14.8	3	Constituency
Montrose Burghs	Thomas Irwin	9,381	44.5	2	Boilermakers
Moray and Nairn	Joseph Forbes Duncan	6,566	32.3	2	Constituency
Morpeth	Ebby Edwards	25,508	61.3	1	Miners
Mossley	Herbert Gibson	19,296	46.0	1	Co-op
Motherwell	James Barr	16,650	58.0	1	ILP
Neath	William Jenkins	29,455	60.2	1	Miners
Nelson and Colne	Arthur Greenwood	28,533	61.0	1	Constituency
New Forest and Christchurch	G. W. Austin	6,206	15.6	3	Constituency
Newark	William Richard Grosvenor Haywood	8,060	23.3	3	Constituency
Newbury	Frank Jacques	3,471	10.0	3	Constituency
Newcastle-under-Lyme	Josiah Wedgwood	20,931	69.9	1	Constituency
Newcastle-upon-Tyne Central	Charles Trevelyan	17,580	57.2	1	Constituency
Newcastle-upon-Tyne East	Martin Henry Connolly	16,921	48.7	2	Boilermakers
Newcastle-upon-Tyne North	Edward Scott	7,573	23.4	2	Constituency
Newcastle-upon-Tyne West	John Palin	16,856	46.6	1	Transport & General
Newport	James Walker	18,653	39.5	1	Iron & Steel
Newton	Robert Young	18,176	60.5	1	Engineering
Normanton	Frederick Hall	26,008	83.1	1	Miners
Northampton	Cecil L'Estrange Malone	22,356	41.7	1	Constituency
North Cornwall	F. E. Church	2,654	08.0	3	Constituency
North Cumberland	C. A. O'Donnell	3,092	13.4	3	Constituency
North Dorset	Colin Clark	2,298	08.9	3	Constituency
North East Derbyshire	Frank Lee	21,633	54.6	1	Miners
North Lanarkshire	Jennie Lee	19,884	55.9	1	ILP
North Norfolk	Noel Noel-Buxton	14,544	47.5	1	Constituency
Northwich	Barbara Ayrton-Gould	15,473	34.3	2	Constituency
Norwich	Dorothy Jewson	31,040	24.0	3	ILP
Norwich	Walter Smith	33,690	26.0	2	Boot & Shoe
Norwood	William O'Brien Reeves	11,042	28.9	2	Constituency
Nottingham Central	Eleanor Barton	11,573	33.2	2	Co-op
Nottingham East	James Baum	9,787	28.0	3	Boot & Shoe
Nottingham South	Holford Knight	14,800	42.9	1	Constituency
Nottingham West	Arthur Hayday	18,593	55.1	1	General & Municipal Workers
Nuneaton	Frank Smith	27,102	44.4	1	Constituency
Ogmore	Vernon Hartshorn	22,900	56.7	1	Miners
Oldham	Gordon Lang	34,223	26.2	1	ILP
Oldham	James Wilson	32,727	25.0	2	Railwaymen
Ormskirk	Samuel Rosbotham	20,350	53.4	1	Constituency
Oswestry	H. S. Evans	6,944	21.0	3	Constituency
Oxford	John Lyttelton Etty	4,694	16.8	3	Constituency
Paddington North	John William Gordon	13,348	39.3	2	Railwaymen
Paisley	James C. Welsh	22,425	55.8	1	ILP
Peckham	John Beckett	15,751	48.9	1	Constituency
Peebles and Southern Midlothian	Joseph Westwood	11,161	45.5	1	Miners
Pembrokeshire	William James Jenkins	12,235	26.9	3	Constituency
Penistone	Rennie Smith	17,286	45.2	1	Miners
Penrith and Cockermouth	Archibald Dodd	4,073	17.4	3	Constituency
Penryn and Falmouth	Frederick Jesse Hopkins	11,166	28.9	3	Constituency
Perth	Helen Gault	8,291	23.5	3	ILP
Peterborough	Frank Horrabin	14,743	39.1	1	Constituency
Petersfield	Gertrude Massingham	3,418	12.1	3	Constituency
Plaistow	Will Thorne	23,635	77.5	1	General & Municipal Workers
Plymouth Devonport	Donald B. Fraser	7,428	22.3	3	Constituency
Plymouth Drake	James John Hamlyn Moses	16,684	44.3	1	Constituency
Plymouth Sutton	William Westwood	16,414	42.7	2	Constituency
Pontefract	Tom Smith	17,335	47.8	1	Miners
Pontypool	Thomas Griffiths	17,805	51.5	1	Iron & Steel
Pontypridd	Thomas Isaac Mardy Jones	20,835	53.1	1	Miners
Poplar South	Samuel March	19,696	64.8	1	Transport & General
Portsmouth Central	Glenvil Hall	15,153	42.4	1	Constituency
Portsmouth North	Edward Archbold	12,475	36.2	2	Constituency
Portsmouth South	Jessie Stephen	10,127	24.8	2	Constituency
Preston	Tom Shaw	37,705	29.5	1	Textile Factory Workers
Pudsey and Otley	A. W. Brown	12,336	30.3	2	Constituency
Putney	John C. Lawder	11,136	36.2	2	Constituency
Reading	Somerville Hastings	23,281	43.5	1	Constituency
Reigate	Percy Collick	8,012	20.9	3	Constituency
Rhondda East	David Watts Morgan	19,010	50.2	1	Miners
Rhondda West	William John	23,238	65.1	1	Miners
Richmond (Surrey)	Philip Butler	9,520	24.1	2	Constituency
Ripon	Arthur Godfrey	4,339	10.3	3	Constituency
Rochdale	William Kelly	22,060	40.2	1	Workers
Romford	H. T. Muggeridge	31,045	44.9	1	Constituency
Ross and Cromarty	Hugh Donald MacIntosh	6,710	41.2	2	Constituency
Rossendale	Arthur Law	14,624	36.0	1	Railwaymen
Rother Valley	Thomas Walter Grundy	30,405	76.3	1	Miners
Rotherham	Fred Lindley	26,937	60.4	1	Woodworkers
Rotherhithe	Ben Smith	14,664	61.6	1	Transport & General
Rothwell	William Lunn	27,320	61.7	1	Miners
Roxburgh and Selkirk	Robert Gibson	9,803	27.6	3	Constituency
Royton	Albert E. Wood	10,763	27.5	3	Constituency
Rugby	John Morgan	11,588	31.4	2	Constituency
Rushcliffe	Florence Widdowson	16,069	35.0	2	Constituency
Rutherglen	William Wright	17,538	52.2	1	ILP
Rutland and Stamford	Henry James Jones	7,403	27.9	2	Constituency
Rye	George A. Greenwood	3,505	11.0	3	Constituency
Saffron Walden	William Cash	8,642	28.3	2	Constituency
St Albans	Monica Whately	11,699	27.6	2	Constituency
St Helens	James Sexton	27,665	58.6	1	Transport & General
St Ives	William Edward Arnold-Forster	4,920	17.1	3	Constituency
St Pancras North	James Marley	17,458	48.5	1	Constituency
St Pancras South East	Herbert Romeril	13,173	47.9	1	Railway Clerks
St Pancras South West	William Carter	12,010	45.6	1	Constituency
St Marylebone	David Amyas Ross	10,960	25.7	2	Constituency
Salford North	Ben Tillett	17,333	46.2	1	Transport & General
Salford South	Joseph Toole	20,100	54.4	1	Constituency
Salford West	Alexander Haycock	15,647	42.8	1	ILP
Salisbury	F. R. Hancock	4,435	13.4	3	Constituency
Scarborough and Whitby	Howard Doncaster Rowntree	4,645	10.8	3	Constituency
Seaham	Ramsay MacDonald	35,615	72.5	1	Constituency
Sedgefield	John Herriotts	15,749	47.7	1	Miners
Sevenoaks	Hamilton Fyfe	6,634	21.2	3	Constituency
Sheffield Attercliffe	Cecil Wilson	19,152	60.3	1	Constituency
Sheffield Brightside	Arthur Ponsonby	20,277	55.2	1	ILP
Sheffield Central	Philip Hoffman	19,183	59.1	1	Shop Assistants
Sheffield Ecclesall	Harry Samuels	7,983	25.7	2	Constituency
Sheffield Hallam	Basil Rawson	12,133	39.1	2	ILP
Sheffield Hillsborough	A. V. Alexander	20,941	57.3	1	Co-op
Sheffield Park	George Lathan	20,304	51.4	1	Railway Clerks
Shipley	William Mackinder	18,654	42.3	1	Distributive Workers
Shoreditch	Ernest Thurtle	20,552	51.5	1	Constituency
Shrewsbury	A. A. Beach	3,662	12.2	3	Constituency
Silvertown	Jack Jones	23,451	85.7	1	General & Municipal Workers
Skipton	John Davies	13,088	31.2	2	Constituency
Smethwick	Oswald Mosley	19,550	54.8	1	Constituency
Southampton	Ralph Morley	31,252	21.7	2	Constituency
Southampton	Tommy Lewis	32,249	22.4	1	Constituency
South Ayrshire	James Brown	16,981	58.1	1	Miners
South Derbyshire	David Pole	25,101	47.4	1	Constituency
South Dorset	Arthur William Wiltshire	6,950	23.4	3	Constituency
South East Essex	John Richard Anthony Oldfield	18,756	37.6	1	Constituency
South Molton	Rudolph Putnam Messel	2,731	08.7	3	Constituency
South Norfolk	George Young	10,686	34.5	2	Constituency
Southport	Arthur Leonard Williams	5,380	12.3	3	Constituency
South Shields	James Chuter Ede	18,938	42.2	1	Constituency
Southwark Central	Harry Day	13,318	52.3	1	Constituency
Southwark North	George Isaacs	9,660	45.8	1	Printers
Southwark South East	Thomas Naylor	13,527	60.4	1	Compositors
South West Norfolk	William Benjamin Taylor	12,152	41.8	1	Constituency
Sowerby	William John Tout	14,223	37.2	1	Textile Factory Workers
Spelthorne	F. Wilson Temple	11,946	30.75	2	Constituency
Spen Valley	Herbert Elvin	20,300	47.7	2	Constituency
Spennymoor	Joseph Batey	20,858	71.8	1	Miners
Stafford	Len Smith	10,011	36.6	2	Boot & Shoe
Stalybridge and Hyde	Hugh Hartley Lawrie	20,343	41.1	1	Workers
Stirling and Clackmannan Western	Tom Johnston	15,179	56.7	1	ILP
Stirling and Falkirk	Hugh Murnin	15,408	47.4	1	Miners
Stockport	Arnold Townend	30,955	27.4	1	Railway Clerks
Stockton-on-Tees	Frederick Fox Riley	18,961	41.2	1	Post Office Workers
Stoke Newington	F. L. Kerran	6,723	28.4	3	Constituency
Stoke-on-Trent	Cynthia Mosley	26,548	58.7	1	Constituency
Stone	George Belt	8,792	27.7	3	Constituency
Stourbridge	Wilfred Wellock	21,343	38.4	1	Constituency
Stratford West Ham	Thomas Groves	16,665	58.6	1	Constituency
Streatham	Fred Hughes	6,134	18.4	3	Constituency
Stretford	Frank Anderson	18,199	41.4	2	Constituency
Stroud	F. E. White	10,384	26.1	3	Plasterers
Sudbury	W. Jack Shingfield	6,147	25.4	3	Constituency
Sunderland	Alfred Smith	31,085	19.0	2	Transport & General
Sunderland	Marion Phillips	31,794	19.5	1	Constituency
Swansea East	David Williams	16,665	56.5	1	Boilermakers
Swansea West	Howel Samuel	13,268	40.6	1	Constituency
Swindon	Christopher Addison	16,885	43.7	1	Constituency
Tamworth	George Horwill	14,402	32.6	2	Constituency
Tavistock	Richard Davies	2,449	10.3	3	Constituency
Taunton	Joseph Sparks	6,615	20.2	3	Constituency
The Hartlepools	Gilbert Oliver	11,052	24.3	3	Constituency
The Wrekin	Edith Picton-Turbervill	14,569	44.4	1	Constituency
Thornbury	Godfrey Elton	13,445	32.8	3	Constituency
Tiverton	Heyman Wreford-Glanville	2,199	07.2	3	Constituency
Tonbridge	William Frederick Toynbee	9,149	24.0	3	Constituency
Torquay	Hubert Medland	5,576	12.8	3	Constituency
Totnes	Kate Spurrell	5,828	12.9	3	Constituency
Tottenham North	Robert Morrison	20884	54.0	1	Co-op
Tottenham South	Frederick Messer	14,423	46.5	1	Constituency
Twickenham	Thomas Jackson Mason	15,121	34.8	2	Constituency
Tynemouth	John Stuart Barr	9,503	29.9	3	Constituency
University of Wales	David W. Richards	671	24.9	2	University Party
Upton	Benjamin Walter Gardner	14,703	49.0	1	Constituency
Uxbridge	Reginald Bridgeman	16,422	38.2	2	Constituency
Wakefield	George Henry Sherwood	13,393	48.8	1	Railwaymen
Wallasey	John Mack	11,544	24.8	3	Constituency
Wallsend	Margaret Bondfield	20,057	49.5	1	General & Municipal Workers
Walsall	John James McShane	20,524	39.6	1	Constituency
Walthamstow East	Harry Wallace	11,039	39.6	1	Post Office Workers
Walthamstow West	Valentine McEntee	16,050	54.0	1	Woodworkers
Wandsworth Central	Archibald Church	11,404	41.8	1	Constituency
Wansbeck	George Shield	27,930	54.4	1	Miners
Warrington	Charles Dukes	21,610	50.6	1	General & Municipal Workers
Warwick and Leamington	Jim Garton	7,741	16.0	3	Constituency
Waterloo	John Clifford Leigh	8,142	24.5	2	Constituency
Watford	Herman Macdonald	9,665	23.8	3	Constituency
Wednesbury	Alfred Short	22,420	50.1	1	Boilermakers
Wellingborough	George Dallas	15,300	42.2	1	Workers
Wells	Ruby Docie Quarrell Davies	4,472	15.0	3	Constituency
Wentworth	George Henry Hirst	35,276	75.1	1	Miners
West Bromwich	Frederick Roberts	19,621	52.0	1	Typographical
Westbury	George Ward	7,458	22.5	3	Railwaymen
West Derbyshire	William Wilkinson	3,660	10.9	3	Constituency
West Dorset	Thomas Robins	4,770	19.1	3	Constituency
Western Isles	John MacDiarmid	3,589	32.5	2	ILP
West Fife	William Adamson	17,668	60.0	1	Miners
Westhoughton	Rhys Davies	22,305	61.5	1	Distributive Workers
Westminster Abbey	James MacDonnell	6,406	26.0	2	Constituency
Westminster St George's	Joseph George Butler	6,294	21.9	2	Constituency
Westmorland	Walter Bone	4,184	12.1	3	Constituency
Weston-super-Mare	Constance Borrett	4,766	11.1	3	Constituency
West Renfrewshire	Robert Forgan	14,419	46.5	1	ILP
Whitechapel and St George's	Harry Gosling	13,701	63.2	1	Transport & General
Whitehaven	M. Philips Price	14,034	46.8	1	ILP
Widnes	Alexander Gordon Cameron	19,125	51.0	1	ILP
Wigan	John Parkinson	27,462	58.5	1	Miners
Willesden East	William Davies Lloyd	13,977	33.1	2	ILP
Willesden West	Samuel Viant	20,583	52.3	1	Woodworkers
Wimbledon	Tom Braddock	9,924	24.2	2	Constituency
Winchester	Robert Arthur Lyster	14,326	36.6	2	Constituency
Windsor	Alfred Chilton	4,049	11.3	3	Constituency
Wirral	George Beardsworth	10,876	21.9	3	Constituency
Wolverhampton East	D. Rowland Williams	8,840	25.7	3	Constituency
Wolverhampton West	William Brown	21,103	49.1	1	Constituency
Wood Green	E. P. Bell	12,360	23.7	3	Constituency
Woodbridge	Leonard Spero	5,507	17.4	3	Constituency
Woolwich East	Harry Snell	20,447	63.2	1	Constituency
Woolwich West	William Barefoot	16,964	44.2	2	Constituency
Worcester	Kenneth Lindsay	8,208	29.3	2	Constituency
Workington	Thomas Cape	20,591	65.2	1	Miners
Wrexham	Robert Richards	20,584	46.4	1	Constituency
Wycombe	Rochelle Townsend	8,899	18.1	3	Constituency
Yeovil	Francis Douglas	7,609	20.1	3	Constituency
York	Frederick George Burgess	20,663	45.0	1	Railwaymen

Gill in Blackburn, Brothers in Bolton, Raynes in Derby, Marcus in Dundee, Smith in Norwich, Wilson in Oldham, Morley in Southampton and Smith in Sunderland were elected by taking second place in a two-seat constituency.

=== By-elections, 1929–1931 ===
By-election	Candidate	Votes	%	Position	Sponsor
1929 Preston by-election	William Jowitt	35,608	54.6	1	Constituency
1929 Leeds South East by-election	James Milner	11,804	95.8	1	Constituency
1929 Twickenham by-election	Thomas Jackson Mason	14,202	46.1	2	Constituency
1929 Kilmarnock by-election	Craigie Aitchison	18,465	55.6	1	Constituency
1929 Tamworth by-election	George Horwill	12,759	35.2	2	Constituency
1929 Liverpool Scotland by-election	David Logan	unopposed	N/A	1	Constituency
1930 Sheffield Brightside by-election	Fred Marshall	11,543	46.4	1	Constituency
1930 Fulham West by-election	John Banfield	15,983	49.6	2	Constituency
1930 Nottingham Central by-election	Alfred Waterson	7,923	28.8	2	Co-op
1930 Glasgow Shettleston by-election	John McGovern	10,699	42.8	1	ILP
1930 North Norfolk by-election	Lucy Noel-Buxton	14,821	50.3	1	Constituency
1930 Bromley by-election	Albert Edwin Ashworth	10,105	18.7	3	Constituency
1930 Paddington South by-election	Dorothy Evans	7,944	26.6	3	Constituency
1930 Shipley by-election	William Mackinder	18,654	42.3	1	Distributive Workers
1930 Whitechapel and St Georges by-election	J. H. Hall	8,544	39.2	1	Transport & General
1931 Bristol East by-election	Stafford Cripps	19,261	61.7	1	Constituency
1931 Liverpool East Toxteth by-election	Charles Burden	5,550	24.6	2	Constituency
1931 Islington East by-election	Leah Manning	10,591	34.7	1	Constituency
1931 Fareham by-election	A. J. Pearson	6,312	22.1	2	Constituency
1931 Salisbury by-election	F. R. Hancock	3,939	13.4	3	Constituency
1931 Pontypridd by-election	David Lewis Davies	20,687	59.9	1	Miners
1931 Sunderland by-election	J. T. Brownlie	30,074	39.8	2	Engineers
1931 Woolwich East by-election	George Hicks	16,200	56.7	1	Builders
1931 Ashton-under-Lyne by-election	John William Gordon	11,005	39.4	2	Railwaymen
1931 Glasgow St Rollox by-election	William Leonard	10,044	45.2	1	Co-op
1931 Ogmore by-election	Edward Williams	19,356	78.8	1	Miners
1931 Rutherglen by-election	David Hardie	16,736	51.4	1	ILP
1931 Stroud by-election	John Maynard	10,688	30.0	2	Constituency
1931 Gateshead by-election	Herbert Evans	22,893	51.6	1	Constituency
1931 Manchester Ardwick by-election	Joseph Henderson	15,294	50.5	1	Railwaymen
1931 Liverpool Wavertree by-election	Samuel Lewis Treleaven	10,042	35.0	2	Constituency

=== 1931 general election ===
Constituency	Candidate	Votes	%	Position	Sponsor
Aberavon	William Cove	23,029	58.4	1	Constituency
Aberdare	George Hall	unopposed	N/A	1	Miners
Aberdeen and Kincardine East	Frederick Martin	6,299	27.8	2	Constituency
Aberdeen North	William Wedgwood Benn	8,753	24.5	2	ILP
Aberdeen South	George Catto	6,627	16.3	2	Constituency
Abertillery	George Daggar	unopposed	N/A	1	Miners
Accrington	Tom Snowden	18,177	37.1	2	Constituency
Acton	James Shillaker	11,924	33.0	2	Constituency
Aldershot	Mary Richardson	4,091	15.6	2	Constituency
Ashton-under-Lyne	John William Gordon	11,074	37.1	2	Railwaymen
Aylesbury	Dorothy Woodman	4,677	10.9	3	Constituency
Ayr Burghs	Clarice Shaw	9,974	26.1	2	ILP
Balham and Tooting	Percy F. Pollard	9,780	25.5	2	Constituency
Barkston Ash	George Saville Woods	14,585	34.3	2	Co-op
Barnard Castle	Will Lawther	10,287	44.7	2	Miners
Barnsley	John Potts	20,622	49.1	2	Miners
Barrow	David Adams	15,835	43.2	2	Engineers
Basingstoke	C. A. Goatcher	4,124	12.2	3	Constituency
Bassetlaw	Harold Mostyn Watkins	13,582	33.4	2	Constituency
Bath	George Gilbert Desmond	5,680	14.7	3	Constituency
Batley and Morley	Ben Turner	16,700	38.8	2	Textile Workers
Battersea North	William Sanders	18,688	35.6	2	Constituency
Battersea South	William Bennett	12,822	30.8	2	Constituency
Bedford	Clare Annesley	9,654	27.8	2	Constituency
Bedwellty	Charles Edwards	unopposed	N/A	1	Miners
Belper	Jack Lees	15,450	39.8	2	ILP
Bermondsey West	Alfred Salter	10,039	48.1	1	Constituency
Berwick and Haddington	George Sinkinson	9,089	26.5	2	Constituency
Bethnal Green North East	William Barratt	10,368	44.1	2	Constituency
Bethnal Green South West	William James Humphreys	3,923	23.0	2	Transport & General Workers
Bilston	John Baker	16,847	44.9	2	Iron & Steel
Birkenhead East	Charles McVey	9,868	26.8	2	Constituency
Birkenhead West	William Henry Egan	12,682	36.2	2	Boilermakers
Birmingham Aston	T. J. May	6,212	19.2	2	Transport & General Workers
Birmingham Deritend	Fred Longden	11,163	34.0	2	Co-op
Birmingham Duddeston	George Francis Sawyer	9,789	36.6	2	Constituency
Birmingham Edgbaston	W. W. Blaylock	5,157	13.5	2	Constituency
Birmingham Erdington	Charles Simmons	16,767	31.9	2	Constituency
Birmingham Handsworth	Louis Anderson Fenn	8,548	21.6	2	Constituency
Birmingham King's Norton	Gilbert Mitchison	11,016	28.7	2	Constituency
Birmingham Ladywood	Wilfrid Whiteley	9,057	28.2	2	Constituency
Birmingham Moseley	Frank Lloyd	13,399	20.2	2	Constituency
Birmingham Sparkbrook	George Archibald	8,538	26.6	2	Constituency
Birmingham West	George Willey	10,507	31.9	2	Constituency
Birmingham Yardley	Archibald Gossling	16,640	33.8	2	Woodworkers
Bishop Auckland	Hugh Dalton	16,796	48.6	2	Constituency
Blackburn	Thomas Gill	25,030	16.6	4	Railway Clerks
Blackburn	Mary Hamilton	25,643	17.0	3	ILP
Blaydon	William Whiteley	18,431	49.3	2	Miners
Bolton	Michael Brothers	32,049	16.4	4	Textile Factory Workers
Bolton	Albert Law	33,736	17.3	3	Textile Factory Workers
Bootle	John Kinley	14,160	38.1	2	Constituency
Bosworth	John Morgan	12,670	32.0	2	Constituency
Bothwell	Joseph Sullivan	14,423	43.5	2	Miners
Bournemouth	J. H. Collingbourne	9,943	20.0	2	Constituency
Bow and Bromley	George Lansbury	16,306	58.3	1	Constituency
Bradford Central	William Leach	15,687	38.6	2	ILP
Bradford North	Philip Butler	12,401	28.2	2	Constituency
Bradford South	William Hirst	15,994	33.6	2	Co-op
Brecon and Radnor	Peter Freeman	17,223	40.2	2	Constituency
Brentford and Chiswick	George Catlin	7,572	25.0	2	Constituency
Bridgwater	James Musgrave Boltz	6,974	22.5	2	Constituency
Brigg	David Quibell	15,614	41.7	2	Constituency
Brighton	Lewis Cohen	12,952	07.4	3	Constituency
Brighton	Rosalind Moore	12,878	07.3	4	Constituency
Bristol Central	Joseph Alpass	15,143	40.4	2	Constituency
Bristol East	Stafford Cripps	19,435	50.6	1	Constituency
Bristol North	Walter Ayles	13,826	33.8	2	Constituency
Bristol South	Alexander Walkden	17,174	39.1	2	Railway Clerks
Bristol West	F. E. White	8,875	17.0	2	Constituency
Brixton	Edward Albert Radice	7,358	23.0	2	Constituency
Bromley	B. B. Gillis	9,265	16.4	2	Constituency
Broxtowe	Seymour Cocks	21,917	51.9	1	Constituency
Buckingham	James Lievsley George	11,736	33.0	2	Constituency
Burnley	Arthur Henderson	26,917	43.0	2	Foundry Workers
Burslem	Andrew MacLaren	16,248	46.0	2	Constituency
Burton	William Paling	8,832	25.3	2	Constituency
Bury	James Bell	10,532	29.7	2	Textile Factory Workers
Caerphilly	Morgan Jones	23,061	67.6	1	Constituency
Camberwell North	Charles Ammon	9,869	48.1	2	Post Office Workers
Camberwell North West	Hector Hughes	8,693	33.1	2	Constituency
Cambridge	Alexander Wood	8,552	26.8	2	Constituency
Cambridgeshire	Geoffrey Garratt	11,013	31.7	2	Constituency
Cardiff Central	Edward Archbold	10,758	30.8	2	Constituency
Cardiff East	James Edmunds	10,292	31.8	2	Constituency
Cardiff South	Arthur Henderson Jr.	12,092	40.2	2	Constituency
Cannock	William Adamson	22,833	45.4	2	Transport & General Workers
Canterbury	Paul Winterton	5,921	16.3	2	Constituency
Cardiganshire	J. Lloyd Jones	6,361	24.0	2	Constituency
Carlisle	George Middleton	13,445	42.7	2	Post Office Workers
Carmarthen	Daniel Hopkin	14,318	36.5	2	Constituency
Carnarvonshire	Elwyn Jones	14,299	37.2	2	Constituency
Chatham	Oliver Baldwin	10,837	33.9	2	Constituency
Chelmsford	Joseph Sparks	7,755	19.5	2	Constituency
Chelsea	Gilbert Foan	4,726	17.0	2	Constituency
Cheltenham	John Ramage	5,263	18.9	2	Constituency
Chesterfield	George Benson	17,046	42.5	2	Constituency
Chester-le-Street	Jack Lawson	24,373	60.6	2	Constituency
Chichester	Claude William Higgins	6,085	12.2	2	Constituency
Chippenham	William Robert Robins	2,194	07.2	3	Constituency
Chislehurst	Tom Colyer	5,731	15.0	2	Constituency
Chorley	John Barrow	12,734	30.7	2	Bleachers
Cirencester and Tewkesbury	John Griffin	5,868	17.2	2	Constituency
City of Chester	Joseph Lewis	5,186	14.8	3	Constituency
Clackmannan and Eastern Stirlingshire	Lauchlin MacNeill Weir	13,669	40.1	2	ILP
Clay Cross	Charles Duncan	21,163	64.6	1	Transport & General Workers
Cleveland	William Mansfield	20,060	39.6	2	Miners
Clitheroe	Stan Awbery	14,920	38.0	2	Transport & General Workers
Coatbridge	James C. Welsh	14,722	46.6	2	Constituency
Colchester	Edward Aylmer Digby	10,725	32.5	2	Constituency
Colne Valley	Ernest Marklew	13,734	31.5	2	Constituency
Consett	Herbert Dunnico	19,927	47.0	2	Constituency
Coventry	Philip Noel-Baker	28,311	39.0	2	Constituency
Crewe	John William Bowen	18,351	42.2	2	Post Office Workers
Croydon North	H. W. Ray	10,795	19.1	2	Constituency
Croydon South	T. Crawford	9,950	19.7	2	Constituency
Darlington	Arthur Shepherd	15,798	39.3	2	Constituency
Dartford	John Edmund Mills	27,349	44.5	2	Constituency
Darwen	Charles Rothwell	5,184	13.4	3	Constituency
Deptford	C. W. Bowerman	22,244	45.6	2	Compositors
Derby	Walter Halls	20,241	14.6	4	Constituency
Derby	William Robert Raynes	21,841	15.7	3	Constituency
Dewsbury	Benjamin Riley	11,101	36.3	2	Constituency
Doncaster	Wilfred Paling	22,363	45.1	2	Miners
Don Valley	Tom Williams	27,599	58.6	1	Miners
Dover	W. Moore	9,781	24.8	2	Constituency
Dudley	W. Hodgkiss	12,105	43.1	2	Constituency
Dulwich	Fred Hughes	4,747	15.6	2	Constituency
Dumfries	J. S. Paterson	7,693	22.3	2	Constituency
Dunbartonshire	Willie Brooke	16,474	36.4	2	Dyers
Dundee	Michael Marcus	32,573	18.6	3	Constituency
Dunfermline Burghs	William McLean Watson	12,247	42.1	2	Constituency
Durham	Joshua Ritson	17,136	49.6	2	Miners
Ealing	James William Maycock	6,857	17.3	2	Constituency
Eastbourne	A. J. Marshall	5,379	14.7	2	Constituency
East Dorset	Edward Joseph Stocker	7,009	15.1	3	Constituency
East Grinstead	Evan Durbin	5,121	12.8	2	Constituency
East Ham North	Susan Lawrence	11,769	34.1	2	Constituency
East Ham South	Alfred Barnes	15,737	46.2	2	Co-op
East Norfolk	Bill Holmes	6,562	20.2	2	Constituency
East Renfrewshire	James Strain	12,477	26.7	2	Constituency
East Surrey	Mont Follick	4,236	11.2	2	Constituency
Ebbw Vale	Aneurin Bevan	unopposed	N/A	1	Miners
Eccles	David Mort	16,101	38.2	2	Iron & Steel
Edinburgh Central	William Graham	10,566	36.2	2	ILP
Edinburgh East	Drummond Shiels	10,244	33.6	2	Constituency
Edinburgh North	Robert Gibson	8,771	25.0	2	Constituency
Edinburgh West	George Mathers	12,704	28.8	2	Railway Clerks
Edmonton	Frank Broad	14,250	43.2	2	Co-op
Elland	Charles Roden Buxton	13,563	34.8	2	Constituency
Enfield	William Mellor	13,646	35.7	2	Constituency
Epping	James Ranger	4,713	08.4	3	Constituency
Epsom	Stanley Morgan	7,571	14.7	2	Constituency
Exeter	James Viner Delahaye	7,958	21.6	3	Constituency
Farnworth	Guy Rowson	19,553	46.5	2	Miners
Faversham	Norman Smith	13,226	34.1	2	Constituency
Finchley	J. George Stone	6,440	15.8	2	Constituency
Finsbury	Thomas Williams	10,133	36.9	2	Co-op
Flintshire	Frances Edwards	16,158	28.6	2	Constituency
Forest of Dean	David Vaughan	13,291	47.3	2	Constituency
Frome	Frederick Gould	17,748	41.7	2	Boot & Shoe
Fulham East	John Maynard	8,917	26.1	2	Constituency
Fulham West	John Banfield	12,164	33.4	2	Constituency
Gainsborough	George Deer	5,856	20.4	3	Constituency
Galloway	Hector McNeil	3,418	10.5	3	Constituency
Gateshead	Ernest Bevin	21,826	37.7	2	Transport & General Workers
Gillingham	Catherine Mary Wadham	9,103	31.0	2	Constituency
Glasgow Cathcart	A. L. Ritchie	8,919	24.7	2	Constituency
Glasgow Central	William Martin	11,456	34.7	2	Constituency
Glasgow Govan	Neil Maclean	15,047	51.0	1	Constituency
Glasgow Maryhill	John Clarke	16,613		2	ILP
Glasgow Partick	Adam McKinlay	11,252	37.3	2	Woodworkers
Glasgow Pollok	John Rankin	6,323	18.6	2	Constituency
Glasgow St Rollox	William Leonard	13,545	44.7	1	Co-op
Glasgow Shettleston	J. Y. Marshall	1,856	05.4	3	Constituency
Glasgow Springburn	George Hardie	16,058	47.0	2	ILP
Glasgow Tradeston	Thomas Henderson	13,579	47.4	2	Co-op
Gloucester	Charles Fox	9,223	32.4	2	Constituency
Gower	David Rhys Grenfell	21,963	53.4	1	Miners
Grantham	Montague William Moore	12,115	30.8	2	Constituency
Gravesend	Ben Greene	15,994	43.9	2	Constituency
Great Yarmouth	John Hanbury Martin	5,735	21.4	2	Constituency
Greenock	Thomas Irwin	10,850	30.7	2	Boilermakers
Greenwich	Edward Timothy Palmer	13,722	30.5	2	Constituency
Grimsby	George Edward Farmery	16,124	32.4	2	Constituency
Guildford	Sidney Peck	6,242	13.8	2	Constituency
Hackney Central	Fred Watkins	9,295	28.5	2	Railway Clerks
Hackney North	Frank Bowles	9,022	30.5	2	Constituency
Hackney South	Herbert Morrison	12,827	44.6	2	Constituency
Halifax	Arthur Longbottom	16,601	29.7	2	Constituency
Hamilton	Duncan Macgregor Graham	14,233	53.9	1	Miners
Hammersmith North	James Patrick Gardner	11,838	37.2	2	Constituency
Hammersmith South	Daniel Chater	8,390	28.5	2	Co-op
Hampstead	Harry Smith	5,475	12.9	2	Constituency
Hanley	Arthur Hollins	15,245	44.3	2	Pottery Workers
Harborough	Frederick Wise	10,212	25.5	2	Constituency
Harrow	George Sandilands	14,241	21.0	2	Constituency
Harwich	E. L. McKeag	4,229	13.6	2	Constituency
Hastings	Irene Goddard	4,983	15.5	2	Constituency
Hemel Hempstead	Albert Millar	2,677	08.2	3	Constituency
Hemsworth	Gabriel Price	23,609	70.5	1	Miners
Hendon	Amber Blanco White	15,305	18.8	2	Constituency
Henley	Frederick Hembury	3,809	11.5	3	Constituency
Hertford	Roger Edwards	7,092	21.6	2	Constituency
Hexham	Ernest Owen Dunnico	7,557	26.9	2	Constituency
Heywood and Radcliffe	James Stott	12,915	28.5	2	Textile Factory Workers
High Peak	George Bagnall	9,640	25.9	2	Constituency
Hitchin	Dermot Freyer	8,312	24.3	2	Constituency
Holborn	Fitzroy Hickinbottom	2,916	15.3	2	Constituency
Holland-with-Boston	John Parker	8,840	22.5	2	Constituency
Hornsey	Hugh Franklin	7,585	15.5	2	Constituency
Horsham and Worthing	Helen Keynes	5,932	11.7	2	Constituency
Houghton-le-Spring	Robert Richardson	22,700	47.1	2	Miners
Huddersfield	James Hudson	20,034	29.9	2	ILP
Huntingdonshire	Maurice Orbach	4,624	16.7	2	Constituency
Hythe	Grace Colman	3,608	15.1	2	Constituency
Ilford	Percy Astins	12,173	18.7	2	Constituency
Ilkeston	George Oliver	17,585	50.0	2	Transport & General Workers
Ince	Gordon Macdonald	23,237	63.4	1	Miners
Inverness	David Norman Mackay	5,941	20.7	2	Constituency
Ipswich	Robert Jackson	17,490	37.0	2	Constituency
Isle of Ely	Francis Joseph Knowles	4,302	13.4	3	Constituency
Isle of Wight	James Drummond	9,639	22.8	2	Constituency
Islington East	Leah Manning	13,111	32.5	2	Constituency
Islington North	Robert Young	14,783	33.9	2	Constituency
Islington South	William Cluse	10,910	37.6	2	Constituency
Islington West	Frederick Montague	9,977	40.8	2	Constituency
Jarrow	Robert John Wilson	18,071	45.9	2	Distributive Workers
Keighley	Hastings Lees-Smith	13,192	31.9	2	ILP
Kennington	Leonard Matters	10,188	35.7	2	Constituency
Kensington North	Fielding West	15,843	36.3	2	Constituency
Kettering	Samuel Perry	17,095	39.8	2	Co-op
Kidderminster	Jessie Stephen	9,814	22.7	2	Constituency
King's Lynn	David Freeman	10,054	29.8	2	Constituency
Kingston upon Hull Central	Joseph Kenworthy	16,113	44.9	2	Constituency
Kingston upon Hull East	George Muff	18,026	42.9	2	Constituency
Kingston upon Hull North West	James Baum	9,946	27.3	2	Boot & Shoe
Kingston upon Hull South West	John Arnott	12,857	33.2	2	ILP
Kingston-upon-Thames	George William Fawcett	7,613	17.5	2	Constituency
Kingswinford	Charles Sitch	19,495	47.1	2	Chainmakers
Kirkcaldy Burghs	Tom Kennedy	14,492	43.1	2	Constituency
Lambeth North	George Strauss	8,766	34.9	2	Constituency
Lancaster	Robert Carrington-Willis	10,309	24.3	2	Constituency
Leeds Central	Moss Turner-Samuels	10,633	28.6	2	Constituency
Leeds North	L. John Edwards	9,427	21.2	2	Constituency
Leeds North East	Alfred Dobbs	10,294	24.5	2	Boot & Shoe
Leeds South	Henry Charleton	14,156	40.1	2	Railwaymen
Leeds South East	James Milner	17,845	52.6	1	Constituency
Leeds West	Thomas Stamford	14,354	36.8	2	ILP
Leek	William Bromfield	18,979	48.6	2	Constituency
Leicester East	Edward Frank Wise	13,811	31.3	2	ILP
Leicester South	John Dugdale	9,892	23.2	2	Constituency
Leicester West	Frederick Pethick-Lawrence	12,923	32.5	2	Constituency
Leigh	Joe Tinker	23,965	52.3	1	Miners
Leith	Arthur Woodburn	13,400	35.0	2	Constituency
Lewes	Frank Rivers Hancock	5,795	18.7	2	Constituency
Lewisham East	John Wilmot	20,485	33.1	2	Constituency
Lewisham West	Michael Stewart	9,956	22.5	2	Constituency
Leyton West	Reginald Sorensen	13,038	36.3	2	Constituency
Lichfield	George Henry Jones	15,790	37.2	2	Constituency
Limehouse	Clement Attlee	11,354	50.5	1	Constituency
Linlithgowshire	Manny Shinwell	16,956	45.3	2	ILP
Lincoln	Robert Arthur Taylor	14,455	41.1	2	Constituency
Liverpool Edge Hill	Jack Hayes	11,772	37.2	2	Constituency
Liverpool Everton	Samuel Lewis Treleaven	7,786	31.2	2	Life Assurance Workers
Liverpool Exchange	Tom McLean	10,894	31.2	2	Transport & General Workers
Liverpool Fairfield	A. Dodd	7,960	24.4	2	Constituency
Liverpool Scotland	David Logan	15,521	56.5	1	Constituency
Liverpool Walton	F. A. P. Rowe	11,183	26.4	2	Constituency
Liverpool Wavertree	Colin Clark	9,504	22.1	2	Constituency
Liverpool West Derby	Joseph Cleary	9,077	22.0	2	Constituency
Liverpool West Toxteth	Joseph Gibbins	14,978	42.1	2	Constituency
Llandaff and Barry	Charles Lloyd	21,767	39.3	2	Constituency
Llanelly	John Henry Williams	34,196	65.3	1	Constituency
Loughborough	Ernest Winterton	14,458	39.3	2	Constituency
Lowestoft	E. J. C. Neep	10,894	32.3	2	Constituency
Ludlow	Tom Hardwick	4,683	19.2	2	Constituency
Luton	James MacDonnell	7,897	19.8	2	Constituency
Macclesfield	David Scott Morton	13,854	31.0	2	Constituency
Maidstone	Gertrude Speedwell Massingham	6,770	19.8	2	Constituency
Maldon	William Frederick Toynbee	9,078	29.2	2	Constituency
Manchester Ardwick	Joseph Henderson	15,664	42.0	2	Railwaymen
Manchester Blackley	Wilfrid Burke	6,752	20.0	3	Constituency
Manchester Clayton	John Edward Sutton	17,169	43.8	2	Miners
Manchester Exchange	Eric Gower	8,727	26.5	2	Constituency
Manchester Gorton	Joseph Compton	16,316	42.3	2	Vehicle Builders
Manchester Hulme	Andrew McElwee	9,219	25.6	2	Constituency
Manchester Moss Side	Albert Emil Davies	8,012	25.6	2	Constituency
Manchester Platting	J. R. Clynes	17,798	43.0	2	General & Municipal Workers
Manchester Rusholme	Jerrold Adshead	6,319	17.6	2	Constituency
Mansfield	Charles Brown	26,865	55.8	1	Constituency
Melton	A. E. Stubbs	8,100	21.1	2	Constituency
Merioneth	James Henry Howard	7,807	32.6	2	Constituency
Mid Bedfordshire	Henry William Fenner	3,156	09.8	3	Constituency
Middleton and Prestwich	Thomas McCall	10,796	25.4	2	Textile Factory Workers
Middlesbrough East	Ellen Wilkinson	12,080	39.6	2	Distributive Workers
Middlesbrough West	Henry Kegie	13,040	33.4	2	Railwaymen
Midlothian and Peebles Northern	Andrew Clarke	8,501	27.7	2	Constituency
Mile End	John Scurr	9,738	44.0	2	Constituency
Mitcham	William Graham	12,124	23.7	2	Constituency
Monmouth	Daniel Hughes	10,217	29.2	2	Constituency
Montrose Burghs	Arthur Fraser Macintosh	5,137	23.0	2	Constituency
Morpeth	Ebby Edwards	18,174	48.7	2	Miners
Mossley	Herbert Gibson	15,587	33.5	2	Co-op
Motherwell	James Barr	14,714	48.7	2	ILP
Neath	William Jenkins	30,873	64.0	1	Miners
Nelson and Colne	Arthur Greenwood	21,063	42.3	2	Constituency
Newark	John Bellerby	10,840	29.9	2	Constituency
Newcastle East	Maurice Alexander	14,176	36.6	2	Constituency
Newcastle North	R. J. Thomson	5,791	16.1	2	Constituency
Newcastle West	John Palin	13,514	32.1	2	Transport & General Workers
New Forest and Christchurch	Frank Stainer	7,130	16.7	2	Constituency
Newport	James Walker	19,238	40.9	2	Iron & Steel
Newton	Robert Young	15,683	49.4	2	Constituency
Normanton	Frederick Hall	22,877	69.6	1	Miners
Northampton	Cecil L'Estrange Malone	10,808	36.4	2	Constituency
North Cornwall	Arthur Bennett	1,907	05.6	3	Constituency
North East Derbyshire	Frank Lee	19,385	47.5	2	Miners
North Norfolk	Lucy Noel-Buxton	13,035	39.5	2	Constituency
Northwich	Barbara Gould	15,746	34.4	2	Constituency
Norwich	Walter Smith	28,295	21.0	3	Boot & Shoe
Norwood	Ann Jane Anstey	7,217	19.0	2	Constituency
Nottingham Central	Alfred Waterson	7,532	22.6	2	Co-op
Nottingham East	Walter Windsor	5,339	15.4	3	General & Municipal Workers
Nottingham South	Alonzo Ralph Ellis	10,583	31.7	2	Transport & General Workers
Nottingham West	Arthur Hayday	14,963	42.1	2	General & Municipal Workers
Nuneaton	Frank Smith	23,375	37.7	2	Constituency
Ogmore	Edward Williams	23,064	61.0	1	Miners
Oldham	Gordon Lang	28,629		3	ILP
Oldham	James Wilson	26,631		4	Railwaymen
Ormskirk	F. V. King	10,115	25.0	2	Constituency
Oswestry	William Elim Warder	8,343	26.0	2	Constituency
Paddington North	Esther Rickards	9,597	28.6	2	Constituency
Paddington South	Lucy Cox	4,532	14.3	2	Constituency
Paisley	James C. Welsh	16,183	38.2	2	ILP
Peckham	Hubert Beaumont	1,350	04.0	4	Constituency
Peebles and Southern Midlothian	Joseph Westwood	9,185	34.5	2	Miners
Penistone	Rennie Smith	14,584	35.6	2	Constituency
Penryn and Falmouth	A. L. Rowse	10,098	24.9	3	Constituency
Peterborough	Frank Horrabin	14,206	34.8	2	Constituency
Petersfield	Albert Albery	3,559	12.0	2	Constituency
Plaistow	Will Thorne	unopposed	N/A	1	General & Municipal Workers
Plymouth Devonport	Paul Reed	9,039	27.8	2	Constituency
Plymouth Drake	James John Hamlyn Moses	12,669	33.6	2	Constituency
Plymouth Sutton	George Ward	14,073	36.7	2	Railwaymen
Pontefract	Tom Smith	16,870	44.6	2	Miners
Pontypool	Thomas Griffiths	18,981	56.3	1	Iron & Steel
Pontypridd	David Lewis Davies	21,751	58.4	1	Miners
Poplar South	David Morgan Adams	16,253	57.6	1	Transport & General Workers
Portsmouth Central	Glenvil Hall	14,512	37.1	2	Constituency
Portsmouth North	Kenneth Dewar	12,182	31.6	2	Constituency
Portsmouth South	W. J. Beck	7,715	19.1	2	Constituency
Preston	Edward Porter	24,660	17.3	4	General & Municipal Workers
Preston	Tom Shaw	25,710	18.0	3	Textile Factory Workers
Pudsey and Otley	William Pickles	10,013	24.0	2	Painters
Putney and Southfields	John Lawder	6,172	18.4	2	Constituency
Reading	Somerville Hastings	19,277	35.3	2	Constituency
Reigate	Percy Collick	7,076	17.3	2	Constituency
Rhondda East	David Watts-Morgan	22,086	68.1	1	Miners
Rhondda West	William John	23,024	84.3	1	Miners
Richmond (Surrey)	John Lamb Thomson	6,460	15.5	2	Constituency
Ripon	Robert Joseph Hall	5,125	11.9	2	Constituency
Rochdale	William Kelly	18,329	32.6	2	Transport & General Workers
Romford	H. T. Muggeridge	31,410	38.5	2	Constituency
Rossendale	Arthur Law	11,135	27.5	3	Railwaymen
Rotherham	Fred Lindley	22,834	49.2	2	Woodworkers
Rotherhithe	Ben Smith	11,536	49.7	2	Transport & General Workers
Rother Valley	Thomas Walter Grundy	26,185	62.3	1	Miners
Rothwell	William Lunn	24,897	52.9	1	Miners
Royton	George Illingworth	5,913	14.4	3	Textile Factory Workers
Rugby	E. J. Pay	10,523	30.1	2	Constituency
Rushcliffe	Florence Paton	14,176	27.9	2	Constituency
Rutherglen	David Hardie	16,866	43.2	2	ILP
Rutland and Stamford	F. E. Church	7,446	28.1	2	Constituency
Saffron Walden	Sidney Stanley Wilson	6,468	22.3	2	Constituency
St Albans	Monica Whately	10,289	21.9	2	Constituency
St Helens	James Sexton	23,701	47.6	2	Transport & General Workers
St Marylebone	Ernest Whitfield	6,147	13.3	2	Constituency
St Pancras North	James Marley	12,257	34.8	2	Constituency
St Pancras South East	Herbert Romeril	8,684	32.1	2	Railway Clerks
St Pancras South West	William Carter	7,514	28.6	2	Constituency
Salisbury	A. B. Lemon	6,956	23.1	2	Constituency
Salford North	Ben Tillett	13,271	34.5	2	Transport & General Workers
Salford South	Joseph Toole	15,302	40.9	2	Constituency
Salford West	Alexander Haycock	12,320	33.8	2	ILP
Scarborough and Whitby	Philip Sidney Eastman	6,575	17.0	2	Constituency
Seaham	William Coxon	23,027	43.7	2	Constituency
Sedgefield	John Herriotts	15,404	41.2	2	Miners
Sheffield Attercliffe	Cecil Wilson	15,020	45.5	2	Constituency
Sheffield Brightside	Fred Marshall	15,528	40.6	2	General & Municipal Workers
Sheffield Central	Philip Hoffman	13,212	38.0	2	Shop Assistants
Sheffield Hallam	Henry McGhee	7,807	22.5	2	Constituency
Sheffield Hillsborough	A. V. Alexander	17,319	42.1	2	Co-op
Sheffield Park	George Lathan	15,783	37.4	2	Railway Clerks
Shipley	William Albert Robinson	14,725	34.5	2	Distributive Workers
Shoreditch	Ernest Thurtle	14,988	43.3	2	Constituency
Shrewsbury	Edward Porter	2,567	08.4	3	Constituency
Silvertown	Jack Jones	19,851	77.8	1	General & Municipal Workers
Skipton	John Davies	13,053	31.8	2	Constituency
Smethwick	W. Ernest Lawrence	13,927	39.9	2	Constituency
Southampton	Tommy Lewis	26,425	16.4	3	Constituency
Southampton	Ralph Morley	26,061	16.1	4	Constituency
South Ayrshire	James Brown	13,733	45.2	2	Miners
South Derbyshire	David Pole	23,958	41.4	2	Constituency
South Dorset	Arthur William Wiltshire	8,809	29.3	2	Constituency
South East Essex	Jack Oldfield	20,066	35.2	2	Constituency
Southend-on-Sea	Albert Bechervaise	7,741	14.3	2	Constituency
South Molton	Rudolph Putnam Messel	3,499	12.0	2	Constituency
South Norfolk	Edwin Gooch	11,148	34.5	2	Constituency
South Shields	Chuter Ede	20,512	40.2	2	Constituency
Southwark Central	Harry Day	8,466	34.7	2	Constituency
Southwark North	George Isaacs	7,053	35.1	2	Printers
Southwark South East	Thomas Naylor	9,678	46.7	2	Compositors
South West Norfolk	W. B. Taylor	9,952	33.7	2	Constituency
Sowerby	William John Tout	11,857	31.7	2	Textile Factory Workers
Spelthorne	Frederick Wilson Temple	9,214	21.3	2	Constituency
Spennymoor	Joseph Batey	18,072	56.2	1	Miners
Spen Valley	Herbert Elvin	15,691	35.4	2	Constituency
Stafford	Len Smith	8,640	31.9	2	Boot & Shoe
Stalybridge and Hyde	William Dobbie	14,251	28.1	2	Railwaymen
Stirling and Falkirk Burghs	Hugh Murnin	12,483	36.4	2	Miners
Stockport	Arnold Townend	23,350	17.0	3	Railway Clerks
Stockton-on-Tees	Frederick Fox Riley	18,168	38.4	2	Post Office Workers
Stoke Newington	F. L. Kerran	5,837	26.7	2	Constituency
Stoke	Ellis Smith	13,264	30.3	2	Patternmakers
Stone	W. I. Simcock	5,993	18.3	3	Constituency
Stourbridge	Wilfred Wellock	18,910	32.8	2	Constituency
Stratford West Ham	Thomas Groves	13,925	50.4	1	Constituency
Streatham	R. B. Fraser	5,343	15.0	2	Constituency
Stretford	Frank Anderson	12,796	24.7	2	Constituency
Stroud	F. W. Davies	11,039	28.6	2	Constituency
Sunderland	Marion Phillips	29,707	18.0	3	Constituency
Sunderland	Denis Pritt	29,680	17.9	4	Constituency
Swansea East	David Williams	17,126	56.5	1	Boilermakers
Swansea West	Howel Samuel	14,587	41.5	2	Constituency
Swindon	Christopher Addison	17,962	44.1	2	Constituency
Tamworth	Joseph Willbery	7,525	15.3	2	Constituency
Taunton	Frank George Bushnell	8,367	27.1	2	Constituency
Tavistock	Richard Davies	2,124	06.4	3	Constituency
The Hartlepools	Alasdair Alpin MacGregor	14,462	31.9	2	Constituency
Thornbury	George Pearce Blizard	11,008	26.3	2	Constituency
Tonbridge	Constance Borrett	8,208	21.2	2	Constituency
Torquay	Hubert Medland	7,351	17.5	2	Constituency
Tottenham North	Robert Morrison	17,651	44.3	2	Co-op
Tottenham South	Frederick Messer	12,602	41.4	2	Constituency
Twickenham	Percy Holman	13,763	26.0	2	Co-op
Tynemouth	T. H. Knight	8,110	23.8	3	Constituency
Upton	Benjamin Walter Gardner	12,453	41.5	2	Constituency
Uxbridge	Lawrence Worsnop	11,609	23.3	2	Constituency
Wakefield	George Sherwood	11,774	42.6	2	Railwaymen
Wallasey	John Mack	7,712	16.1	2	Constituency
Wallsend	Margaret Bondfield	18,393	41.4	2	General & Municipal Workers
Walsall	John James McShane	23,952	44.0	2	Constituency
Walthamstow East	Harry Wallace	9,983	31.2	2	Post Office Workers
Walthamstow West	Valentine McEntee	14,144	45.1	1	Woodworkers
Wandsworth Central	J. L. Cohen	7,512	27.7	2	Constituency
Wansbeck	George Shield	24,126	41.8	2	Miners
Warrington	Charles Dukes	19,055	43.9	2	General & Municipal Workers
Watford	Frank Jacques	9,423	21.7	2	Constituency
Wednesbury	Alfred Short	20,842	45.5	2	Boilermakers
Wellingborough	George Dallas	14,137	39.0	2	Transport & General Workers
Wentworth	George Henry Hirst	31,861	68.8	1	Miners
West Bromwich	Frederick Roberts	17,204	44.4	2	Typographical
Westbury	Maurice Hackett	5,127	15.5	3	Constituency
West Fife	William Adamson	11,063	35.8	2	Miners
Weston-super-Mare	Bernard Craig	5,095	14.3	2	Constituency
Westhoughton	Rhys Davies	19,301	53.4	1	Distributive Workers
West Stirlingshire	Tom Johnston	12,952	46.7	2	ILP
Whitechapel and St George's	J. H. Hall	9,864	41.6	2	Transport & General Workers
Whitehaven	M. Philips Price	14,255	46.7	2	ILP
Widnes	Alexander Gordon Cameron	15,309	37.9	2	ILP
Wigan	John Parkinson	23,544	51.1	1	Miners
Willesden East	William Davies Lloyd	10,010	21.4	2	Constituency
Willesden West	Samuel Viant	15,550	39.4	2	Woodworkers
Wimbledon	Tom Braddock	9,674	19.6	2	Constituency
Winchester	Robert Arthur Lyster	13,529	30.3	2	Constituency
Wirral	Stanley Wormald	10,117	18.5	2	Constituency
Wolverhampton East	John Smith	6,340	18.7	3	Constituency
Woodbridge	Ida Mary Nussey Keeble	5,885	18.7	2	Constituency
Wood Green	E. P. Bell	11,980	21.3	2	Constituency
Woolwich East	George Hicks	16,658	50.9	1	Builders
Woolwich West	Joseph Reeves	14,520	35.4	2	Constituency
Worcester	Hubert Bolton	3,874	14.4	3	Constituency
Workington	Thomas Cape	18,469	54.9	1	Miners
The Wrekin	Edith Picton-Turbervill	14,162	38.9	2	Constituency
Wrexham	Robert Richards	20,653	47.9	2	Constituency
Wycombe	Leslie Haden-Guest	10,821	20.8	2	Constituency
Yeovil	Hamilton Fyfe	5,377	13.6	3	Constituency
York	Frederick George Burgess	16,310	35.1	2	Railwaymen

=== By-elections, 1931–1935 ===
By-election	Candidate	Votes	%	Position	Sponsor
1932 Croydon South by-election	Rudolph Putnam Messel	9,189	32.5	2	
1932 Dunbartonshire by-election	Tom Johnston	13,704	35.6	2	Constituency
1932 Wakefield by-election	Arthur Greenwood	13,586	50.6	1	Constituency
1932 Dulwich by-election	Helen Bentwich	3,905	19.3	2	Constituency
1932 Montrose Burghs by-election	Tom Kennedy	7,030	41.4	2	Constituency
1932 Wednesbury by-election	William Banfield	21,977	54.7	1	Bakers
1932 Twickenham by-election	Percy Holman	16,881	43.8	2	Constituency
1932 Cardiganshire by-election	D. M. Jones	5,295	19.2	3	Constituency
1933 Liverpool Exchange by-election	Sydney Silverman	12,412	45.0	2	Constituency
1933 East Fife by-election	Joseph Westwood	6,635	22.0	1	Constituency
1933 Rotherham by-election	William Dobbie	28,767	69.1	1	Railwaymen
1933 Ashford by-election	W. J. Beck	6,333	17.6	3	Constituency
1933 Rhondda East by-election	William Mainwaring	14,127	42.5	1	Miners
1933 Normanton by-election	Tom Smith	unopposed	N/A	1	Miners
1933 Hitchin by-election	William Bennett	10,362	41.6	2	Constituency
1933 Altrincham by-election	James Hudson	8,333	16.8	3	Constituency
1933 Clay Cross by-election	Arthur Henderson	21,931	69.3	1	Foundry Workers
1933 Fulham East by-election	John Wilmot	17,790	57.9	1	Constituency
1933 Kilmarnock by-election	James Barr	9,924	27.4	2	Constituency
1933 Skipton by-election	John Davies	14,157	33.5	2	Constituency
1933 Manchester Rusholme by-election	George Woods	11,005	40.1	2	Co-op
1933 Rutland and Stamford by-election	Arnold William Gray	12,818	46.7	2	Constituency
1933 Harborough by-election	William Bennett	12,460	32.9	2	Constituency
1933 Wentworth by-election	Wilfred Paling	unopposed	N/A	1	Miners
1934 Cambridge by-election	Alexander Wood	12,176	41.8	2	Constituency
1934 Lowestoft by-election	Reginald Sorensen	13,992	42.1	2	Constituency
1934 Portsmouth North by-election	Edward Thomas Humby	11,904	40.4	2	Constituency
1934 Combined Scottish Universities by-election	Robert Gibson	4,750	20.8	2	University Party
1934 Basingstoke by-election	James William Barker	4,663	15.5	3	Constituency
1934 Hammersmith North by-election	Fielding West	14,263	55.7	1	Constituency
1934 West Ham Upton by-election	Benjamin Walter Gardner	11,998	56.4	1	Constituency
1934 Hemsworth by-election	George Griffiths	unopposed	N/A	1	Miners
1934 Merthyr by-election	S. O. Davies	18,645	51.8	1	Miners
1934 Monmouth by-election	D. Hughes	11,094	35.0	2	Constituency
1934 Twickenham by-election	Percy Holman	19,890	43.9	2	Co-op
1934 Weston-super-Mare by-election	Albert Edward Millett	5,715	16.6	3	Constituency
1934 Rushcliffe by-election	H. J. Cadogan	15,081	38.0	2	Constituency
1934 Lambeth North by-election	George Strauss	11,281	57.9	1	Constituency
1934 Swindon by-election	Christopher Addison	20,902	53.4	1	Constituency
1934 Putney by-election	Edith Summerskill	12,936	45.3	2	Constituency
1935 Liverpool Wavertree by-election	Joseph Cleary	15,611	35.3	1	Constituency
1935 Norwood by-election	Barbara Gould	12,799	40.4	2	Constituency
1935 Perth by-election	Adam McKinlay	7,984	31.3	2	Constituency
1935 Edinburgh West by-election	William McAdam	10,462	33.9	2	Railwaymen
1935 Aberdeen South by-election	Joseph Forbes Duncan	10,760	34.0	2	Constituency
1935 Combined Scottish Universities by-election	Naomi Mitchison	4,293	17.3	2	University Party
1935 Liverpool West Toxteth by-election	Joseph Gibbins	14,908	60.9	1	Constituency
1935 Dumfriesshire by-election	John Downie	10,697	39.7	2	Co-op

=== 1935 general election ===
Constituency	Candidate	Votes	%	Position	Sponsor
Aberavon	William Cove	unopposed	N/A	1	Constituency
Aberdare	George Hall	unopposed	N/A	1	Miners
Aberdeen and Kincardine Central	Gordon Stott	6,128	22.9	2	Constituency
Aberdeen and Kincardine East	Frederick Martin	9,627	43.0	2	Constituency
Aberdeen North	George Garro-Jones	16,952	48.7	1	Constituency
Aberdeen South	George Rettie McIntosh	11,817	31.9	2	Constituency
Abertillery	George Daggar	unopposed	N/A	1	Miners
Accrington	Frederick George Burgess	21,203	45.6	2	Railwaymen
Acton	William McLaine	13,559	41.5	2	Constituency
Altrincham	Abraham Moss	21,493	29.8	2	Constituency
Anglesey	Henry Jones	6,959	27.6	3	Constituency
Ashford	W. J. Beck	6,333	17.6	3	Constituency
Ashton-under-Lyne	Fred Simpson	14,140	50.2	1	Railway Clerks
Aylesbury	Eric Shearer	4,716	11.0	3	Constituency
Ayr Burghs	Arthur Brady	13,274	33.9	2	Constituency
Balham and Tooting	William Davies Lloyd	12,960	37.1	2	Constituency
Banbury	W. E. Wade	11,456	34.3	2	Constituency
Barkston Ash	Frank Smithson	16,525	39.1	2	Co-op
Barnard Castle	Thomas Sexton	11,458	49.8	1	Constituency
Barnsley	John Potts	25,318	58.9	1	Miners
Barrow-in-Furness	Percy Barstow	17,919	49.7	2	Railwaymen
Basingstoke	James Whybrew	3,207	10.0	3	Constituency
Bassetlaw	Frederick Bellenger	21,903	51.3	1	Constituency
Bath	George Gilbert Desmond	7,185	19.7	3	Constituency
Batley and Morley	Willie Brooke	21,182	53.6	1	Dyers
Battersea North	William Sanders	17,596	58.7	1	Constituency
Battersea South	Herbert Romeril	15,821	42.7	2	Railway Clerks
Bedford	Norman Mickle	13,604	37.7	2	Constituency
Bedwellty	Charles Edwards	unopposed	N/A	1	Miners
Belper	Jack Lees	19,250	48.9	2	Constituency
Bermondsey West	Alfred Salter	12,603	62.2	1	Constituency
Berwick and Haddington	John Robertson	14,299	41.9	2	Miners
Bethnal Green North East	Daniel Chater	11,581	63.5	1	Co-op
Bethnal Green South West	George Jeger	7,945	46.9	2	Constituency
Bilston	David Mort	17,820	48.8	2	Iron & Steel
Birkenhead East	Mary Mercer	8,028	23.3	3	Constituency
Birkenhead West	Charles McVey	13,931	44.1	2	Constituency
Birmingham Aston	Rudolph Putnam Messel	8,578	31.2	2	Constituency
Birmingham Deritend	Fred Longden	10,144	40.5	2	Co-op
Birmingham Duddeston	George Francis Sawyer	9,789	36.6	2	Constituency
Birmingham Edgbaston	Jerrold Adshead	6,381	18.4	2	Constituency
Birmingham Erdington	Charles Simmons	17,757	37.4	2	Constituency
Birmingham Handsworth	Albert Chattaway	8,910	27.0	2	Constituency
Birmingham King's Norton	Gilbert Mitchison	18,684	43.2	2	Constituency
Birmingham Ladywood	Hubert Humphreys	7,311	28.3	2	Constituency
Birmingham Moseley	Julius Silverman	17,543	28.6	2	Constituency
Birmingham Sparkbrook	Henry Whittaker	8,063	31.5	2	Constituency
Birmingham West	George Willey	9,159	35.7	2	General & Municipal Workers
Birmingham Yardley	Charles Jarman	18,879	42.3	2	Seamen
Bishop Auckland	Hugh Dalton	20,481	62.3	1	Constituency
Blackburn	James Bell	34,571	23.9	3	Textile Factory Workers
Blackburn	George Henry Walker	34,423	23.8	4	Typographical
Blackpool	Harvey Thorneycroft	13,598	18.3	2	Constituency
Blaydon	William Whiteley	24,148	62.3	1	Miners
Bodmin	Harold Falconer	2,496	07.2	3	Constituency
Bolton	Albert Law	39,890	21.4	3	Textile Factory Workers
Bolton	John Lynch	39,871	21.4	4	Textile Factory Workers
Bootle	John Kinley	13,285	38.8	2	Constituency
Bosworth	Charles Rothwell	15,816	40.8	2	Constituency
Bothwell	James C. Welsh	20,900	60.3	1	Miners
Bournemouth	Maurice Solomon Davidson	13,279	28.9	2	Constituency
Bow and Bromley	George Lansbury	19,064	77.0	1	Transport & General Workers
Bradford Central	William Leach	16,397	51.8	1	Constituency
Bradford East	Wilfred Heywood	7,329	21.7	3	Textile Workers
Bradford North	Muriel Nichol	14,047	35.2	2	Constituency
Bradford South	William Hirst	17,121	41.5	2	Co-op
Brecon and Radnor	Leslie Haden-Guest	19,910	47.4	2	Constituency
Brentford and Chiswick	Frederick Wilson Temple	9,296	34.6	2	Constituency
Bridgwater	Arthur Loveys	6,240	19.8	3	Constituency
Brigg	David Quibell	18,495	50.3	1	Constituency
Brighton	Lewis Cohen	18,743	11.7	4	Constituency
Brighton	Alban Gordon	19,287	12.1	3	Constituency
Bristol Central	Joseph J. Taylor	14,258	47.5	2	Constituency
Bristol East	Stafford Cripps	22,009	59.3	1	Constituency
Bristol North	Walter Ayles	16,149	43.5	2	Constituency
Bristol South	Alexander Walkden	22,586	50.4	1	Railway Clerks
Bristol West	Percy Williams	15,058	29.0	2	Constituency
Brixton	Marcus Lipton	10,908	36.1	2	Constituency
Bromley	Charles Wye Kendall	11,800	20.0	2	Constituency
Broxtowe	Seymour Cocks	26,854	63.0	1	Constituency
Buckingham	Joseph Sparks	14,928	42.0	2	Constituency
Burnley	Wilfrid Burke	31,160	53.6	1	Distributive Workers
Burslem	Andrew MacLaren	18,030	54.2	1	Constituency
Burton	Gladys Paling	8,041	25.5	2	Constituency
Bury	Edith Summerskill	12,845	34.4	2	Constituency
Bute and North Ayrshire	Manny Shinwell	13,358	37.4	2	Constituency
Carnarvonshire	Elwyn Jones	16,450	44.5	2	Constituency
Caerphilly	Morgan Jones	24,846	76.3	1	Constituency
Camberwell North	Charles Ammon	11,701	64.7	1	Post Office Workers
Camberwell North West	Hector Hughes	10,931	45.3	2	Constituency
Camborne	Harold Greaves	7,375	25.8	2	Constituency
Cambridge	Alexander Wood	13,436	41.5	2	Constituency
Cambridge University	Lionel Elvin	3,453	19.2	3	University Party
Cambridgeshire	John Bellerby	11,437	32.0	2	Constituency
Cannock	William Adamson	27,922	51.0	1	Transport & General Workers
Canterbury	Richard Adams	9,164	25.7	2	Constituency
Cardiff Central	John Dugdale	12,094	36.8	2	Constituency
Cardiff East	William Bennett	11,362	37.8	2	Constituency
Cardiff South	Harry Nathan	14,384	49.1	2	Constituency
Cardiganshire	Moelwyn Hughes	10,085	38.9	2	Constituency
Carlisle	Arnold Townend	13,956	41.0	2	Railway Clerks
Carmarthen	Daniel Hopkin	18,146	47.5	1	Constituency
Chatham	Hugh Gaitskell	13,315	40.9	2	Constituency
Chelmsford	Fred Hughes	11,690	29.2	2	Constituency
Chelsea	George Somerville Sandilands	6,348	25.1	2	Constituency
Cheltenham	Elizabeth Pakenham	7,784	29.5	2	Constituency
City of Chester	Agnes Bulley	6,450	19.3	3	Constituency
Chesterfield	George Benson	21,439	50.9	1	Constituency
Chester-le-Street	Jack Lawson	29,111	71.0	1	Miners
Chichester	Claude William Higgins	10,384	21.7	2	Constituency
Chippenham	William Robert Robins	3,527	12.2	3	Constituency
Chislehurst	Tom Colyer	12,227	21.8	2	Constituency
Chorley	Arthur Whiting	17,286	41.4	2	General & Municipal Workers
Clackmannan and East Stirlingshire	Lauchlin MacNeill Weir	14,881	42.3	1	Constituency
Clapham	Monica Whately	11,368	23.0	2	Constituency
Clay Cross	Alfred Holland	24,590	74.6	1	Constituency
Cleveland	William Mansfield	23,776	47.3	2	General & Municipal Workers
Clitheroe	Stan Awbery	14,920	38.0	2	Transport & General Workers
Coatbridge	James Barr	17,535	57.2	1	Constituency
Colchester	Hubert Beaumont	14,039	41.4	2	Constituency
Colne Valley	Ernest Marklew	16,725	39.5	1	Constituency
Consett	David Adams	25,419	58.7	1	Engineering
Coventry	Philip Noel-Baker	34,841	48.3	2	Constituency
Crewe	John William Bowen	20,620	48.7	1	Post Office Workers
Croydon North	Frank Mitchell	17,872	32.9	2	Constituency
Croydon South	Tom Crawford	14,900	29.0	2	Constituency
Darlington	Arthur Shepherd	18,105	44.8	2	Constituency
Dartford	Janet Adamson	35,596	48.2	2	Constituency
Darwen	Frances Kerby	7,778	20.9	3	Constituency
Daventry	T. E. Barnes	10,767	36.3	2	Constituency
Denbigh	J. R. Hughes	4,963	14.3	3	Constituency
Deptford	Walter Henry Green	27,021	57.3	1	Co-op
Derby	Leonard John Barnes	24,594	19.7	4	Constituency
Derby	Herbert Arthur Hind	25,037	20.0	3	Constituency
Dewsbury	Ben Riley	14,066	47.2	1	Constituency
Doncaster	Alfred Short	29,963	57.6	1	Constituency
Don Valley	Tom Williams	33,220	68.9	1	Miners
Dover	W. H. Bennett	14,588	36.0	2	Constituency
Dudley	William Wedgwood Benn	11,509	45.2	2	Constituency
Dulwich	James Vinor Delahaye	7,142	25.7	3	Constituency
Dumbarton Burghs	David Kirkwood	20,409	65.2	1	Engineering
Dumfriesshire	John Downie	11,685	34.6	2	Co-op
Dunbartonshire	Thomas Cassells	20,679	41.9	2	Constituency
Dundee	Robert Gibson	43,747	23.2	4	Constituency
Dundee	Michael Marcus	44,457	23.6	3	Constituency
Dunfermline Burghs	William McLean Watson	16,271	52.3	1	Miners
Durham	Joshua Ritson	21,517	59.1	1	Miners
Ealing	Mark Auliff	9,972	25.9	2	Constituency
East Dorset	Edward Joseph Stocker	10,823	22.7	3	Constituency
East Fife	Alexander Kerr Davidson	6,016	17.7	2	Constituency
East Grinstead	Stanislaus Seuffert	8,097	21.6	2	Constituency
East Ham North	Thomas Burden	14,762	49.1	2	Railway Clerks
East Ham South	Alfred Barnes	18,949	59.3	1	Co-op
East Norfolk	Norman Reeve Tillett	10,461	31.2	2	Constituency
East Renfrewshire	James Barr	21,475	34.0	2	Co-op
East Surrey	Henry Edward Weaver	9,025	21.1	2	Constituency
Ebbw Vale	Aneurin Bevan	25,007	77.8	1	Miners
Eccles	Jack Grierson	20,055	47.3	2	Railwaymen
Edinburgh Central	Andrew Gilzean	9,659	41.4	2	Scottish Socialist
Edinburgh East	Frederick Pethick-Lawrence	13,341	43.2	1	Constituency
Edinburgh North	Gerald Walker Crawford	8,654	27.7	2	Constituency
Edinburgh South	Barbara Woodburn	5,365	16.5	2	Constituency
Edinburgh West	James C. Welsh	13,794	33.0	2	Constituency
Edmonton	Frank Broad	21,940	55.2	1	Co-op
Elland	Charles Roden Buxton	17,856	47.8	2	Constituency
Enfield	William Mellor	18,543	43.5	2	Constituency
Epping	James Ranger	9,758	16.5	3	Constituency
Epsom	Stanley Morgan	19,286	27.9	2	Constituency
Evesham	W. E. Warder	6,264	21.8	2	Constituency
Exeter	John Stafford Cripps	13,764	39.2	2	Constituency
Eye	Harry Leonard Self	7,613	26.1	2	Constituency
Fareham	Robert Mack	10,561	24.9	2	Constituency
Farnham	Donald M. Fraser	7,725	21.5	2	Constituency
Farnworth	Guy Rowson	22,040	51.7	1	Miners
Faversham	Norman Smith	19,060	45.4	2	Constituency
Finchley	Cyril Lacey	6,533	15.4	3	Constituency
Finsbury	George Saville Woods	13,408	55.8	1	Co-op
Flintshire	Cyril Jones	16,131	27.2	3	Constituency
Forest of Dean	M. Philips Price	16,768	57.6	1	Constituency
Frome	Kim Mackay	18,690	43.9	2	Constituency
Fulham East	John Wilmot	17,689	48.6	2	Constituency
Fulham West	Mont Follick	14,978	43.3	2	Constituency
Fylde	Thomas McNamee	16,379	29.2	2	Constituency
Gainsborough	E. Pittwood	4,698	16.7	3	Constituency
Gateshead	James Wilson	25,804	47.3	2	Railwaymen
Gillingham	Evan Durbin	10,032	34.9	2	Constituency
Glasgow Bridgeton	Samuel McLaren	594	02.2	3	Constituency
Glasgow Camlachie	William Reid	2,732	08.5	3	Constituency
Glasgow Cathcart	Alasdair Alpin MacGregor	12,995	37.9	2	Constituency
Glasgow Central	Richard Stokes	13,186	44.1	2	Constituency
Glasgow Gorbals	Alexander Burnett	1,786	05.9	3	Constituency
Glasgow Govan	Neil Maclean	15,791	51.0	1	Constituency
Glasgow Hillhead	James McCullock	8,566	31.8	2	Constituency
Glasgow Kelvingrove	Hector McNeil	14,951	48.1	2	Scottish Socialist
Glasgow Maryhill	John James Davidson	21,706	55.0	1	Constituency
Glasgow Partick	Adam McKinlay	13,316	46.0	2	Scottish Socialist
Glasgow Pollok	James McInnes	8,670	27.9	2	Constituency
Glasgow St Rollox	William Leonard	16,708	61.6	1	Co-op
Glasgow Shettleston	George Beggs	2,610	07.5	3	Constituency
Glasgow Springburn	George Hardie	20,286	63.1	1	Constituency
Glasgow Tradeston	Thomas Henderson	12,253	47.1	1	Co-op
Gloucester	Moss Turner-Samuels	11,803	42.9	2	Constituency
Gower	David Grenfell	25,632	66.8	1	Miners
Grantham	Montague William Moore	16,009	41.9	2	Constituency
Gravesend	Ben Greene	15,994	43.9	2	Constituency
Great Yarmouth	John Lewis	11,658	40.7	2	Constituency
Greenock	Thomas Irwin	16,945	44.0	2	Boilermakers
Greenwich	Joseph Reeves	20,436	47.6	2	Co-op
Grimsby	Henry Brinton	23,743	48.3	2	Constituency
Guildford	F. A. Campbell	11,833	25.1	2	Constituency
Hackney Central	Fred Watkins	15,322	51.6	1	Railway Clerks
Hackney North	Frank Bowles	13,920	48.1	2	Constituency
Hackney South	Herbert Morrison	15,830	59.3	1	Constituency
Halifax	Arthur Longbottom	21,471	39.5	2	Railway Clerks
Hamilton	Duncan Graham	17,049	65.7	1	Miners
Hammersmith North	D. N. Pritt	15,464	52.8	1	Constituency
Hammersmith South	William Thomas Adams	9,309	37.7	2	Constituency
Hampstead	Harry Smith	6,987	18.0	2	Constituency
Hanley	Arthur Hollins	17,211	52.0	1	Potters
Harborough	Ronald McKinnon Wood	14,718	36.8	2	Constituency
Harrow	Helen Bentwich	31,422	37.3	2	Constituency
Harwich	Ambrose Appelbe	9,170	29.7	2	Constituency
Hastings	William Wate Wood	9,404	31.0	2	Constituency
Hemel Hempstead	Charles William James	4,951	15.4	3	Constituency
Hemsworth	George Griffiths	28,298	80.1	1	Miners
Hendon	Amber Blanco White	28,375	26.8	2	Constituency
Hereford	George Clarke	2,397	08.1	3	Constituency
Hertford	Roger Edwards	11,492	35.2	2	Constituency
Hexham	Ernest Kinghorn	10,324	37.5	2	Constituency
Heywood and Radcliffe	Tom McLean	17,799	39.5	2	Transport & General Workers
High Peak	R. W. Wright	9,559	26.9	2	Constituency
Hitchin	George Lindgren	12,417	36.7	2	Constituency
Holborn	Richard Jeffries	4,325	27.1	2	Constituency
Holderness	Joseph Leopold Schultz	8,906	21.5	3	Constituency
Holland with Boston	Ernest Reynold	13,264	34.5	2	Constituency
Honiton	J. R. Morris	8,916	28.1	2	Constituency
Horncastle	Frank Knowles	7,982	31.2	2	Constituency
Hornsey	Mari Power	10,320	21.9	2	Constituency
Horsham and Worthing	Harold William Paton	12,466	23.1	2	Constituency
Houghton-le-Spring	William Stewart	30,665	57.2	1	Miners
Howdenshire	James Richardson	2,459	08.6	3	Constituency
Huddersfield	William Pickles	23,844	39.2	2	Painters
Huntingdonshire	James Lievsley George	7,861	31.3	2	Constituency
Ilford	Percy Astins	25,241	36.9	2	Constituency
Ilkeston	George Oliver	23,851	64.3	1	Transport & General Workers
Ince	Gordon Macdonald	26,334	72.6	1	Miners
Inverness	Hugh Fraser	7,297	27.5	2	Constituency
Ipswich	Robert Jackson	21,278	42.7	2	Constituency
Isle of Wight	William Miller	15,586	36.8	2	Constituency
Islington East	Gwyn Jones	13,810	39.8	2	Constituency
Islington North	Robert Young	17,359	45.6	2	Constituency
Islington South	William Cluse	12,526	52.4	1	Compositors
Islington West	Frederick Montague	11,340	55.0	1	Constituency
Jarrow	Ellen Wilkinson	20,324	53.1	1	Distributive Workers
Keighley	Hastings Lees-Smith	20,124	50.5	1	Constituency
Kennington	Leonard Matters	11,856	48.9	2	Constituency
Kensington North	Frank Carter	15,309	43.1	2	Constituency
Kensington South	Charles Henry Hartwell	4,779	11.1	2	Constituency
Kettering	Joe Sadler	21,042	47.9	2	Co-op
Kidderminster	Charles Coombes	12,485	30.5	2	Constituency
Kilmarnock	James Crawford	12,558	33.4	2	Boot & Shoe
King's Lynn	Frank Emerson	12,062	34.5	2	Constituency
Kingston upon Hull Central	Walter Windsor	14,851	52.9	1	General & Municipal Workers
Kingston upon Hull East	George Muff	19,054	49.3	1	Constituency
Kingston upon Hull North West	Edgar Young	14,044	42.1	2	Constituency
Kingston upon Hull South West	John Arnott	13,975	41.0	2	Constituency
Kingston-upon-Thames	George Henry Loman	10,014	20.5	2	Constituency
Kingswinford	Arthur Henderson Jr.	20,925	50.0	1	Constituency
Kirkcaldy Burghs	Tom Kennedy	19,457	56.3	1	Constituency
Lambeth North	George Strauss	10,577	55.4	2	Constituency
Lanark	Jack Gibson	10,950	35.0	2	Constituency
Lancaster	Charles Royle	9,938	20.0	3	Constituency
Leeds Central	Fred Lindley	13,701	43.6	2	Woodworkers
Leeds North	L. John Edwards	13,792	31.0	2	Constituency
Leeds North East	Alfred Dobbs	14,080	35.2	2	Boot & Shoe
Leeds South	Henry Charleton	15,223	46.0	1	Railwaymen
Leeds South East	James Milner	19,552	65.7	1	Constituency
Leeds West	Thomas Stamford	17,311	45.7	2	Constituency
Leek	William Bromfield	23,432	57.4	1	Constituency
Leicester East	Frederick Gould	17,532	42.6	2	Boot & Shoe
Leicester South	Leslie Maddock	13,395	35.0	2	Constituency
Leicester West	John Morgan	15,734	43.5	2	Constituency
Leigh	Joe Tinker	unopposed	N/A	1	Miners
Leith	David Cleghorn Thomson	13,818	42.2	2	Constituency
Lewes	Frank Rivers Hancock	10,559	30.0	2	Co-op
Lewisham East	Freda Corbet	25,425	44.6	2	Constituency
Lewisham West	Michael Stewart	14,803	35.4	2	Constituency
Leyton East	Albert Bechervaise	10,507	44.7	2	Constituency
Leyton West	Reginald Sorensen	16,408	50.2	1	Constituency
Lichfield	George Henry Jones	20,191	46.2	2	Miners
Limehouse	Clement Attlee	14,600	66.5	1	Constituency
Lincoln	George Deer	15,264	46.0	2	Constituency
Linlithgowshire	George Mathers	20,905	54.1	1	Railway Clerks
Liverpool Edge Hill	Jack Hayes	13,581	49.5	2	Constituency
Liverpool Everton	Bertie Kirby	10,962	50.4	1	Constituency
Liverpool Exchange	S. Mahon	13,027	42.8	2	Constituency
Liverpool Fairfield	Arthur Moody	11,155	37.5	2	Woodworkers
Liverpool Kirkdale	John Hamilton	9,984	36.7	2	Constituency
Liverpool Scotland	David Logan	16,036	65.7	1	Constituency
Liverpool Walton	Frederick Lees McGhee	14,079	38.4	2	Constituency
Liverpool Wavertree	Joseph Cleary	19,068	41.5	2	Constituency
Liverpool West Derby	James Haworth	10,218	28.1	2	Constituency
Liverpool West Toxteth	Joseph Gibbins	18,543	52.9	1	Constituency
Llandaff and Barry	Charles Lloyd	27,677	48.7	2	Constituency
Llanelly	John Henry Williams	unopposed	N/A	1	Constituency
London University	Norman Angell	3,918	30.4	2	University Party
Lonsdale	R. S. Armstrong	6,946	24.2	2	Constituency
Loughborough	Ernest Winterton	14,653	40.6	2	Constituency
Louth	Jack Franklin	12,261	38.4	2	Constituency
Lowestoft	Frederick Wise	13,348	38.8	2	Constituency
Ludlow	T. Hardwick	6,151	27.3	2	Constituency
Luton	F. L. Kerran	15,181	34.5	2	Constituency
Macclesfield	George Darling	14,761	32.0	2	Constituency
Maidstone	Warren MacAlpine	9,340	27.5	2	Constituency
Maldon	William Frederick Toynbee	9,264	28.9	2	Constituency
Manchester Ardwick	Joseph Henderson	16,364	52.9	1	Railwaymen
Manchester Blackley	W. E. Davies	9,370	27.1	3	Constituency
Manchester Clayton	John Jagger	19,225	53.7	1	Distributive Workers
Manchester Exchange	Eric Mendel	8,313	28.2	2	Constituency
Manchester Gorton	Joseph Compton	20,039	55.9	1	Vehicle Builders
Manchester Hulme	Barbara Ayrton-Gould	11,221	39.7	2	Constituency
Manchester Moss Side	Leslie Lever	10,694	41.3	2	Constituency
Manchester Platting	J. R. Clynes	18,352	51.9	1	General & Municipal Workers
Manchester Rusholme	Albert Knight	9,258	29.4	2	Constituency
Manchester Withington	D. Scott Morton	12,248	21.5	2	Constituency
Mansfield	Charles Brown	31,803	68.0	1	Constituency
Melton	A. E. Stubbs	12,704	32.5	2	Constituency
Merioneth	Thomas Jones	8,317	35.2	2	Constituency
Merthyr	S. O. Davies	20,530	68.0	1	Miners
Mid Bedfordshire	Thomas Henry Knight	4,224	13.2	3	Constituency
Middlesbrough East	Alfred Edwards	12,699	44.0	1	Constituency
Middlesbrough West	Henry Kegie	12,764	33.7	2	Railwaymen
Middleton and Prestwich	Joseph Nuttall	17,398	38.9	2	Textile Factory Workers
Midlothian and Peebles Northern	James Lean	13,970	37.1	2	Constituency
Mile End	Daniel Frankel	13,177	57.2	1	Constituency
Mitcham	Paul Winterton	26,087	42.5	2	Constituency
Monmouth	Michael Foot	13,454	36.6	2	Constituency
Montrose	J. Erskine Harper	6,632	30.4	2	Constituency
Moray and Nairn	James Davidson Vassie	7,347	36.5	2	Constituency
Morpeth	Robert Taylor	28,900	59.2	1	Miners
Mossley	Herbert Gibson	22,399	47.7	2	Co-op
Motherwell	James Walker	14,755	50.7	1	Iron & Steel
Neath	William Jenkins	unopposed	N/A	1	Miners
Nelson and Colne	Sydney Silverman	26,011	54.5	1	Constituency
New Forest and Christchurch	Catherine Mary Wadham	10,876	25.2	2	Constituency
Newark	Arcihbald Ward Sharman	13,127	37.6	2	Constituency
Newbury	Richard Russell	9,125	27.0	2	Constituency
Newcastle-under-Lyme	Josiah Wedgwood	unopposed	N/A	1	Constituency
Newcastle-upon-Tyne Central	Walter Monslow	10,871	40.7	2	Locomotive Engineers
Newcastle-upon-Tyne East	Bernard Benjamin Gillis	16,322	41.4	2	Constituency
Newcastle-upon-Tyne North	E. Gilbert	7,693	23.1	2	Constituency
Newcastle-upon-Tyne West	William Taylor	17,052	40.1	2	Constituency
Newport	Peter Freeman	21,755	48.3	2	Constituency
Newton	Robert Young	19,992	58.5	1	Engineering
Normanton	Tom Smith	26,705	81.4	1	Miners
Northampton	Reginald Paget	23,983	48.5	2	Constituency
North Dorset	M. M. Whitehead	1,360	05.2	4	Constituency
North East Derbyshire	Frank Lee	25,382	57.2	1	Miners
North Lanarkshire	Gilbert McAllister	6,763	14.6	3	Constituency
North Norfolk	Lucy Noel-Buxton	14,465	44.7	2	Constituency
Northwich	Thomas Reid	20,289	46.5	2	Constituency
Norwich	Glenvil Hall	24,670	20.0	3	Constituency
Norwich	Christopher John Kelly	22,055	17.8	4	Railwaymen
Norwood	Barbara Ayrton-Gould	12,799	40.4	2	Constituency
Nottingham Central	William Allitt	10,193	35.3	2	Co-op
Nottingham East	Leon Freedman	7,435	25.7	2	Constituency
Nottingham South	T. J. May	10,963	36.8	2	Transport & General Workers
Nottingham West	Arthur Hayday	19,697	53.7	1	General & Municipal Workers
Nuneaton	Reginald Fletcher	33,237	48.4	1	Constituency
Ogmore	Ted Williams	unopposed	N/A	1	Miners
Oldham	Matthew Burrow Farr	29,647		4	Textile Factory Workers
Oldham	Gordon Lang	34,316		3	Constituency
Ormskirk	F. V. King	19,579	41.5	2	Constituency
Oxford	Patrick Gordon-Walker	9,661	37.2	2	Constituency
Oxford University	J. L. Stocks	2,683	17.6	4	University Party
Paddington North	Caroline Ganley	9,925	34.4	2	Co-op
Paddington South	Ronald William Thomson	5,722	21.1	2	Constituency
Paisley	Oliver Baldwin	22,077	49.6	2	Constituency
Peckham	Lewis Silkin	14,457	48.7	2	Constituency
Peebles and South Midlothian	David Pryde	12,209	47.2	2	Miners
Pembrokeshire	William James Jenkins	12,341	27.6	3	Constituency
Penistone	Henry McGhee	23,869	53.5	1	Constituency
Penrith and Cockermouth	Harold Smith	8,036	35.7	2	Constituency
Penryn and Falmouth	A. L. Rowse	13,105	32.1	2	Constituency
Perth	Robert Gunn	8,209	26.3	2	Constituency
Peterborough	Ernest Davies	17,373	43.4	2	Constituency
Petersfield	John Ernest Lionel Birch	6,061	20.9	2	Constituency
Plaistow	Will Thorne	18,493	73.3	1	General & Municipal Workers
Plymouth Devonport	John Brown	9,756	31.9	2	Constituency
Plymouth Drake	James John Hamlyn Moses	15,368	41.7	2	Constituency
Plymouth Sutton	George Ward	15,394	41.7	2	Railwaymen
Pontefract	Adam Hills	19,783	53.4	1	Railwaymen
Pontypool	Arthur Jenkins	22,346	67.9	1	Constituency
Pontypridd	David Lewis Davies	unopposed	N/A	1	Miners
Poplar South	David Morgan Adams	18,715	73.2	1	Constituency
Portsmouth Central	David Freeman	10,733	29.9	2	Constituency
Portsmouth North	Edward Thomas Humby	11,502	33.4	2	Constituency
Portsmouth South	John Fawcett	9,043	24.8	2	Constituency
Preston	Robert Arthur Lyster	32,225	23.3	3	Constituency
Preston	Richard Reiss	31,827	23.1	4	Constituency
Pudsey and Otley	Lucy Cox	9,997	23.3	3	Constituency
Putney	Andrew Aiken Watson	10,895	31.9	2	Constituency
Reading	Somerville Hastings	22,949	43.2	2	Constituency
Reigate	Leonard Lewis	10,748	26.2	2	Constituency
Rhondda East	William Mainwaring	22,088	61.8	1	Miners
Rhondda West	William John	unopposed	N/A	1	Miners
Richmond (Yorks)	Alfred Jonathan Best	7,369	22.7	1	Constituency
Richmond upon Thames	Lewis Gassman	10,953	26.5	2	Constituency
Ripon	Robert Joseph Hall	9,116	22.8	2	Constituency
Rochdale	William Kelly	22,281	41.2	1	Transport & General Workers
Romford	John Parker	55,723	54.0	1	Constituency
Ross and Cromarty	John MacKinnon MacDiarmid	3,284	23.3	2	Constituency
Rossendale	Evelyn Walkden	14,769	37.1	2	Distributive Workers
Rother Valley	Edward Dunn	33,271	72.0	1	Miners
Rotherham	William Dobbie	29,725	67.5	1	Railwaymen
Rotherhithe	Ben Smith	14,416	59.7	1	Transport & General Workers
Rothwell	William Lunn	31,472	64.5	1	Miners
Roxburgh and Selkirk	James Alexander Cuthburt Thomson	6,099	16.6	3	Constituency
Royton	Leonard Oakes	8,845	22.5	3	Bleachers
Rugby	Harold William Fenner	13,061	38.5	2	Constituency
Rushcliffe	H. J. Cadogan	19,349	37.5	2	Constituency
Rutherglen	David Hardie	20,131	49.3	2	Constituency
Rutland and Stamford	Arnold William Gray	11,238	40.1	2	Constituency
Saffron Walden	Clara Rackham	9,633	32.9	2	Constituency
St Albans	Hugh Franklin	16,233	35.5	2	Constituency
St Helens	William Albert Robinson	29,044	53.7	1	Distributive Workers
St Marylebone	Elizabeth Jacobs	8,088	20.4	2	Constituency
St Pancras North	Henry Montague Tibbles	13,287	42.3	2	Constituency
St Pancras South East	Santo Jeger	10,340	44.0	2	Constituency
St Pancras South West	James Edmond Sears	10,670	45.0	2	Constituency
Salford North	William McAdam	15,272	43.4	2	Railwaymen
Salford South	Joseph Toole	15,932	49.5	2	Constituency
Salford West	Alexander Haycock	14,732	40.4	2	Constituency
Salisbury	Edgar J. Plaisted	8,259	28.5	2	Constituency
Scarborough and Whitby	T. Wilson Coates	3,195	07.4	3	Constituency
Seaham	Manny Shinwell	38,380	68.2	1	Constituency
Sedgefield	John Leslie	20,375	52.3	1	Shop Assistants
Sheffield Attercliffe	Cecil Wilson	18,663	62.8	1	Constituency
Sheffield Brightside	Fred Marshall	18,985	58.5	1	General & Municipal Workers
Sheffield Central	Philip Hoffman	13,408	49.2	2	Shop Assistants
Sheffield Ecclesall	Kenneth Brooks	8,173	26.2	2	Constituency
Sheffield Hallam	Grace Colman	10,346	32.7	2	Constituency
Sheffield Hillsborough	A. V. Alexander	21,025	54.3	1	Co-op
Sheffield Park	George Lathan	21,153	51.5	1	Railway Clerks
Shipley	Arthur Creech Jones	16,102	36.0	1	Transport & General Workers
Shoreditch	Ernest Thurtle	18,602	61.4	1	Constituency
Shrewsbury	Cecil Poole	9,606	34.3	2	Constituency
Silvertown	Jack Jones	18,177	81.0	1	General & Municipal Workers
Skipton	John Davies	17,788	43.8	2	Constituency
Smethwick	Charles Wortham Brook	15,023	47.5	2	Constituency
Southampton	Tommy Lewis	30,751	20.6	3	Constituency
Southampton	Ralph Morley	30,028	20.1	4	Constituency
South Ayrshire	James Brown	18,190	57.6	1	Miners
South Derbyshire	F. A. P. Rowe	29,462	48.5	2	Constituency
South Dorset	Arthur William Wiltshire	8,580	28.2	2	Constituency
South East Essex	Jack Oldfield	24,942	42.5	2	Constituency
Southend-on-Sea	Helen Keynes	7,796	13.8	3	Constituency
South Molton	H. F. Chilcott	5,610	21.3	2	Constituency
South Norfolk	Colin Clark	13,409	42.1	2	Constituency
Southport	Robert Carrington-Willis	11,419	27.8	2	Constituency
South Shields	Chuter Ede	22,031	48.2	1	Constituency
Southwark Central	Harry Day	11,098	53.3	1	Constituency
Southwark North	George Isaacs	8,007	49.8	2	Printers
Southwark South East	Thomas Naylor	11,942	63.2	1	Compositors
South West Norfolk	Sidney Dye	11,943	42.7	2	Constituency
Sowerby	William John Tout	16,035	46.2	2	Textile Factory Workers
Spelthorne	Bernard Lytton-Bernard	13,957	31.6	2	Constituency
Spennymoor	Joseph Batey	21,473	71.2	1	Miners
Spen Valley	Ivor Thomas	21,029	49.2	2	Constituency
Stafford	Frank Lloyd	12,514	43.6	2	Constituency
Stalybridge and Hyde	Roland Casasola	20,421	44.5	2	Constituency
Stirling and Falkirk	Joseph Westwood	17,958	51.2	1	Constituency
Stockport	James Hudson	28,798	20.1	3	Constituency
Stockport	C. T. Douthwaite	27,528	19.2	4	Constituency
Stockton on Tees	Susan Lawrence	19,217	40.3	2	Constituency
Stoke Newington	David Weitzman	7,448	35.4	2	Constituency
Stoke	Ellis Smith	20,992	52.7	1	Patternmakers
Stone	William Simcock	13,099	39.0	2	Constituency
Stourbridge	Wilfred Wellock	19,597	34.3	2	Constituency
Stratford West Ham	Thomas Groves	14,427	63.1	1	Constituency
Streatham	Arthur Skeffington	7,951	23.8	2	Constituency
Stretford	Tom Myers	19,278	35.6	2	Constituency
Stroud	Constance Borrett	14,133	36.8	2	Constituency
Sudbury	Horace Denton	3,670	15.5	3	Constituency
Sunderland	George Catlin	32,483	20.0	3	Constituency
Sunderland	Leah Manning	32,059	19.8	4	Constituency
Swansea East	David Williams	unopposed	N/A	1	Boilermakers
Swansea West	Percy Morris	16,703	47.1	2	Constituency
Swindon	Christopher Addison	19,757	48.8	2	Constituency
Tamworth	John Yates	11,026	20.5	2	Constituency
Taunton	James Lunnon	11,219	36.6	2	Constituency
Tavistock	Charles Henry Townsend	2,236	06.7	3	Constituency
The Hartlepools	Charles Goatcher	16,931	37.0	2	Constituency
The Wrekin	Geoffrey Garratt	15,040	42.1	2	Constituency
Thornbury	F. A. Heron	15,164	37.5	2	Distributive Workers
Tonbridge	F. M. Landau	9,405	24.6	2	Constituency
Torquay	Frank Scardifield	6,387	15.0	3	Constituency
Totnes	William Roy John Henwood	3,848	08.3	3	Constituency
Tottenham North	Robert Morrison	21,075	57.2	1	Co-op
Tottenham South	Frederick Messer	15,834	58.5	1	Constituency
Twickenham	Percy Holman	22,823	37.8	2	Co-op
Tynemouth	Samuel Segal	10,145	29.8	2	Constituency
University of Wales	Ithel Davies	1,768	38.7	2	University Party
Upton	Benjamin Gardner	13,685	53.2	1	Constituency
Uxbridge	Lawrence Worsnop	24,000	37.4	2	Constituency
Wakefield	Arthur Greenwood	15,804	56.0	1	Constituency
Wallasey	John Airey	13,491	32.6	2	Constituency
Wallsend	Margaret Bondfield	21,462	47.4	2	General & Municipal Workers
Walsall	William Graham	19,594	39.5	2	Constituency
Walthamstow East	Harry Wallace	14,378	46.0	2	Post Office Workers
Walthamstow West	Valentine McEntee	17,613	61.8	1	Woodworkers
Wandsworth Central	F. Wynne Davies	10,405	41.4	2	Constituency
Wansbeck	Edward Dowling	29,904	49.2	2	Miners
Warrington	Edward Porter	20,720	49.3	2	General & Municipal Workers
Warwick and Leamington	J. Perry	10,930	23.4	2	Constituency
Watford	Stanley Walter Morgan	14,906	34.6	2	Constituency
Wednesbury	William Banfield	22,683	53.3	1	Bakers
Wellingborough	George Dallas	17,713	49.5	2	Transport & General Workers
Wells	William James Waring	5,716	20.5	3	Constituency
Wentworth	Wilfred Paling	37,471	82.1	1	Miners
West Bromwich	Frederick Roberts	19,113	51.3	1	Typographical
Westbury	R. St John Reade	5,641	17.5	3	Constituency
Western Isles	Malcolm Macmillan	5,421	41.0	1	Constituency
West Fife	William Adamson	12,869	35.7	2	Miners
Westhoughton	Rhys Davies	21,093	60.4	1	Distributive Workers
Westminster Abbey	William Smith Kennedy	5,255	22.5	2	Constituency
Westminster St George's	Anne Fremantle	4,643	15.4	2	Constituency
Westmorland	Evelyn Short	10,417	31.5	2	Constituency
West Renfrewshire	Jean Mann	12,407	38.8	2	Scottish Socialist
Weston-super-Mare	George Elvin	6,625	15.7	3	Constituency
West Stirlingshire	Tom Johnston	16,015	55.1	1	Constituency
Whitechapel and St Georges	J. H. Hall	13,374	54.7	1	Transport & General Workers
Whitehaven	Frank Anderson	14,794	48.9	1	Railway Clerks
Widnes	Alexander Gordon Cameron	19,187	44.0	2	Constituency
Wigan	John Parkinson	27,950	61.3	1	Miners
Willesden East	Maurice Orbach	15,523	35.0	2	Constituency
Willesden West	Samuel Viant	19,402	45.9	2	Woodworkers
Wimbledon	Tom Braddock	17,452	32.2	2	Constituency
Winchester	Leonard Williams	15,739	35.6	2	Constituency
Wirral	Stanley Wormald	15,801	27.5	2	Constituency
Wolverhampton East	Ted Lane	4,985	15.2	3	Constituency
Wolverhampton West	Richard Lee	1,325	03.7	3	Constituency
Wood Green	Dorothy Woodman	14,561	24.8	2	Constituency
Woodbridge	Albert Victor Smith	8,808	27.9	2	Constituency
Woolwich East	George Hicks	17,563	58.0	1	Builders
Woolwich West	Arthur George Wansborough	17,373	41.3	2	Constituency
Worcester	James Ferguson	6,152	23.3	3	Constituency
Workington	Thomas Cape	unopposed	N/A	1	Miners
Wrexham	Robert Richards	23,650	56.3	1	Constituency
Wycombe	Ernest Whitfield	18,817	35.1	2	Constituency
Yeovil	Albert Edward Millett	7,567	20.1	3	Constituency
York	Robert Fraser	19,168	43.0	2	Constituency

=== By-elections, 1935–1945 ===
By-election	Candidate	Votes	%	Position	Sponsor
1936 Combined Scottish Universities by-election	David Cleghorn Thomson	3,597	12.4	3	University Party
1936 Ross and Cromarty by-election	Hector McNeil	5,967	33.0	2	Constituency
1936 Dunbartonshire by-election	Thomas Cassells	20,187	48.1	1	Constituency
1936 Llanelli by-election	Jim Griffiths	32,188	66.8	1	Miners
1936 Peckham by-election	Lewis Silkin	13,007	50.2	1	Constituency
1936 Lewes by-election	Alban Gordon	7,557	34.0	2	Constituency
1936 Derby by-election	Philip Noel-Baker	28,419	52.5	1	Constituency
1936 Balham and Tooting by-election	W. J. Miller	12,889	46.3	2	Constituency
1936 East Grinstead by-election	Albert Edward Millett	5,708	20.4	2	Constituency
1936 Birmingham Erdington by-election	Charles Simmons	20,834	43.5	2	Constituency
1936 Clay Cross by-election	George Ridley	24,290	75.1	1	Railway Clerks
1936 Preston by-election	Frank Bowles	30,970	46.4	2	Constituency
1936 Greenock by-election	Robert Gibson	20,594	53.4	1	Constituency
1937 St Pancras North by-election	Henry Montague Tibbles	11,476	49.4	2	Constituency
1937 Manchester Gorton by-election	William Wedgwood Benn	17,849	57.7	1	Constituency
1937 Richmond-upon-Thames by-election	George Rogers	7,709	27.3	2	Constituency
1937 Tonbridge by-election	Harold Smith	8,147	24.7	2	Constituency
1937 Farnham by-election	Peter Pain	7,792	25.3	2	Constituency
1937 Stalybridge and Hyde by-election	Gordon Lang	21,567	49.6	2	Constituency
1937 Wandsworth Central by-election	Harry Nathan	12,406	51.0	2	Constituency
1937 Birmingham West by-election	Richard Crossman	9,632	43.4	2	Constituency
1937 York by-election	John Dugdale	17,986	44.9	2	Constituency
1937 Glasgow Hillhead by-election	Gilbert McAllister	7,539	34.0	2	Constituency
1937 Buckingham by-election	James Delahaye	12,820	37.6	2	Constituency
1937 Plymouth Drake by-election	Geoffrey Garratt	11,044	41.2	2	Constituency
1937 Cheltenham by-election	Cyril Poole	5,570	21.2	2	Constituency
1937 Hemel Hempstead by-election	Charles William James	3,651	14.0	3	Constituency
1937 Holland with Boston by-election	Ernest E. Reynolds	14,556	40.0	2	Constituency
1937 Ilford by-election	Percy Astins	16,214	38.8	2	Constituency
1937 Kingston-upon-Thames by-election	George Henry Loman	9,972	33.4	2	Constituency
1937 Glasgow Springburn by-election	Agnes Hardie	14,859	62.6	1	Constituency
1937 Islington North by-election	Leslie Haden-Guest	13,523	52.5	1	Constituency
1937 Hastings by-election	William Wate Wood	11,244	37.9	2	Constituency
1938 Farnworth by-election	George Tomlinson	24,298	59.1	1	Textile Factory Workers
1938 Pontypridd by-election	Arthur Pearson	22,159	59.9	1	Constituency
1938 Ipswich by-election	Richard Stokes	27,604	53.0	1	Constituency
1938 Fulham West by-election	Edith Summerskill	16,583	52.2	1	Constituency
1938 Lichfield by-election	Cecil Poole	23,856	51.2	1	Constituency
1938 Aylesbury by-election	Reginald Groves	7,666	19.1	3	Constituency
1938 West Derbyshire by-election	Charles Frederick White	11,216	32.5	2	Constituency
1938 Stafford by-election	Frank Lloyd	12,346	42.4	2	Constituency
1938 Barnsley by-election	Frank Collindridge	23,566	64.4	1	Miners
1938 Willesden East by-election	Maurice Orbach	12,278	43.4	2	Constituency
1938 Dartford by-election	Jennie Adamson	46,514	52.4	1	Constituency
1938 Walsall by-election	George Jeger	21,562	42.9	2	Constituency
1938 Doncaster by-election	John Morgan	31,735	61.3	1	Constituency
1938 Lewisham West by-election	Arthur Skeffington	16,939	42.9	2	Constituency
1938 Fylde by-election	Mabel Tylecote	17,648	31.6	2	Constituency
1939 East Norfolk by-election	Norman R. Tillett	10,785	37.1	2	Constituency
1939 Holderness by-election	Joseph Leopold Schultz	9,629	21.3	3	Constituency
1939 Ripon by-election	Robert Joseph Hall	10,213	30.5	2	Constituency
1939 Batley and Morley by-election	Hubert Beaumont	20,020	55.4	1	Constituency
1939 South Ayrshire by-election	Alexander Sloan	17,908	58.0	1	Miners
1939 Sheffield Hallam by-election	Charles S. Darvill	9,939	38.3	2	
1939 Birmingham Aston by-election	Samuel Segal	6,122	33.7	2	
1939 Southwark North by-election	George Isaacs	5,815	57.4	1	Printers
1939 Kennington by-election	John Wilmot	10,715	60.1	1	Constituency
1939 Caerphilly by-election	Ness Edwards	19,847	68.0	1	Constituency
1939 Monmouth by-election	Frank Hancock	11,543	39.9	2	
1939 Colne Valley by-election	Glenvil Hall	17,277	48.6	1	Constituency
1939 Brecon and Radnorshire by-election	William Jackson	20,679	53.4	1	Constituency
1939 Clackmannanshire and East Stirlingshire by-election	Arthur Woodburn	15,645	93.7	1	Constituency
1939 Ashton-under-Lyne by-election	William Jowitt	unopposed	N/A	1	Constituency
1940 Swansea East by-election	David Mort	unopposed	N/A	1	Iron & Steel
1940 Southwark Central by-election	John Hanbury Martin	5,285	64.3	1	Constituency
1940 Silvertown by-election	James Hollins	14,343	92.8	1	Constituency
1940 Battersea North by-election	Francis Douglas	9,947	92.6	1	Constituency
1940 Bow and Bromley by-election	Charles Key	11,594	95.8	1	Constituency
1940 Wandsworth Central by-election	Ernest Bevin	unopposed	N/A	1	Transport & General Workers
1940 Rochdale by-election	Hyacinth Morgan	unopposed	N/A	1	Constituency
1941 Doncaster by-election	Evelyn Walkden	unopposed	N/A	1	Distributive Workers
1941 Dunbartonshire by-election	Adam McKinlay	21,900	85.0	1	Transport & General Workers
1941 Carmarthen by-election	Ronw Hughes	unopposed	N/A	1	Constituency
1941 Greenock by-election	Hector McNeil	unopposed	N/A	1	Constituency
1941 Pontefract by-election	Percy Barstow	unopposed	N/A	1	Railwaymen
1942 North East Derbyshire by-election	Henry White	unopposed	N/A	1	Miners
1942 Keighley by-election	Ivor Bulmer-Thomas	unopposed	N/A	1	Constituency
1942 Nuneaton by-election	Frank Bowles	unopposed	N/A	1	Constituency
1942 Manchester Gorton by-election	William Oldfield	unopposed	N/A	1	Constituency
1942 Newcastle-under-Lyme by-election	John Mack	unopposed	N/A	1	Life Assurance Workers
1942 Wigan by-election	William Foster	unopposed	N/A	1	Miners
1942 Spennymoor by-election	James Murray	unopposed	N/A	1	Miners
1942 Rothwell by-election	Thomas Brooks	unopposed	N/A	1	Miners
1942 Whitechapel and St Georges by-election	Walter Edwards	unopposed	N/A	1	Transport & General Workers
1942 Poplar South by-election	William Henry Guy	3,375	86.2	1	Constituency
1942 Sheffield Park by-election	Thomas Burden	unopposed	N/A	1	Constituency
1942 Manchester Clayton by-election	Harry Thorneycroft	8,892	93.3	1	Constituency
1942 Ince by-election	Tom Brown	unopposed	N/A	1	Miners
1943 Hamilton by-election	Tom Fraser	unopposed	N/A	1	Miners
1943 Consett by-election	James Glanville	unopposed	N/A	1	Miners
1944 Kirkcaldy Burghs by-election	Thomas Hubbard	8,268	51.6	1	Constituency
1944 Sheffield Attercliffe by-election	John Hynd	unopposed	N/A	1	Railwaymen
1944 Camberwell North by-election	Cecil Manning	2,655	79.8	1	Constituency
1944 Clay Cross by-election	Harold Neal	13,693	76.3	1	Miners
1945 Motherwell by-election	Alexander Anderson	10,800	48.6	2	Constituency
1945 Neath by-election	D. J. Williams	30,847	79.3	1	Miners
