= Thomas Broad =

British politician

Rev. Thomas Tucker Broad (1863 – 26 January 1935), was a British Congregational Minister and Liberal Party politician.

== Background ==
Broad was educated at New College London and University College London. He married Margaret Cooper in 1902.

== Professional career ==
Broad was a member of Sheffield Board of Guardians. He was engaged during the Great War in connection with YMCA Huts.

== Political career ==
Broad was Liberal candidate for the new Clay Cross division of Derbyshire at the 1918 General Election. He received the "coalition coupon" and there was no Unionist Party candidate opposing him. He won the seat with a majority of 8% of the votes over his Labour Party opponent. For the 1922 election, when he stood as a National Liberal, the local Liberal association not only decided to run an anti-coalition candidate against him but had attracted former Liberal cabinet minister, Charles Masterman as their candidate. Masterman polled nearly twice as many votes as Broad. With the Liberal vote split, the Labour candidate was able to take the seat. At the 1923 general election, with the two factions of the Liberal Party reunited, Broad stood in the Leyton East, but came third with only 28% of the votes. He did not stand for Parliament again. He wrote and published 'An All-In National Insurance Scheme. Security for all workers and their families' in 1924.

=== Electoral record ===
General election 1918: Clay Cross
Party		Candidate	Votes	%	±%
C	Liberal	Thomas Tucker Broad	7,987	54.1	n/a
	Labour	Frank Hall	6,766	45.9	n/a
Majority			1,221	8.2	n/a
Turnout			14,753	50.6	n/a
Registered electors			29,181		
	Liberal win (new seat)				
C indicates candidate endorsed by the coalition government.

General election 1922: Clay Cross
Party	Candidate	Votes	%	±%
Labour	Charles Duncan	13,206	57.9	+12.0
Liberal	Charles Masterman	6,294	27.6	n/a
National Liberal	Thomas Tucker Broad	3,294	14.5	−39.6
Majority		6,912	30.3	n/a
Turnout		22,794	72.1	+21.5
Registered electors		31,611		
Labour gain from Liberal		Swing	+25.8	

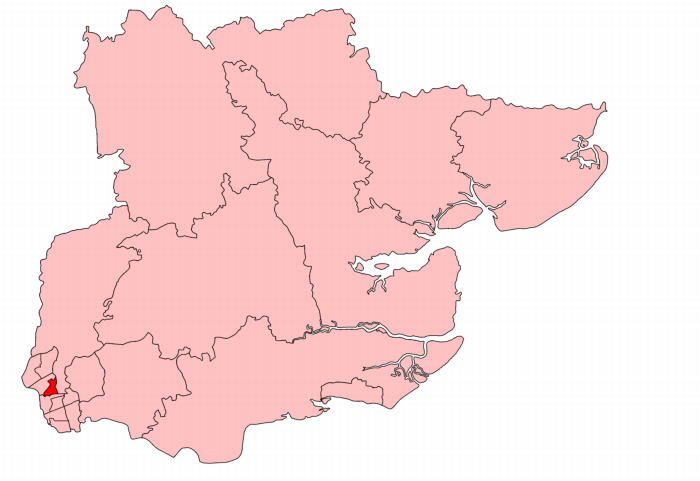
Leyton East in Essex 1923

General election 1923: Leyton East
Party	Candidate	Votes	%	±%
Labour	Archibald Church	7,944	39.5	+8.6
Unionist	Ernest Edward Alexander	6,533	32.4	−6.2
Liberal	Thomas Tucker Broad	5,669	28.1	+20.0
Majority		1,411	7.1	n/a
Turnout		20,146	69.1	−3.1
Registered electors		29,166		
Labour gain from Unionist		Swing	+7.4	

Parliament of the United Kingdom
New constituency	Member of Parliament for Clay Cross; 1918 – 1922	Succeeded by Charles Duncan
