= Harold Neal =

British politician (1897–1972)

Member of Parliament for Bolsover Clay Cross (1945–1950)
- In office 14 April 1944 – 29 May 1970
- Preceded by: George Ridley
- Succeeded by: Dennis Skinner

Vice-President of the Derbyshire Miners' Association
- In office 1942–1944
- Preceded by: Samuel Greenough
- Succeeded by: Henry White

Personal details
- Born: 3 July 1897
- Died: 24 August 1972 (aged 75)

Harold Neal (3 July 1897 – 24 August 1972) was a British Labour Party politician. He was Member of Parliament (MP) for Clay Cross from a 1944 by-election to 1950, and after boundary changes, for Bolsover from 1950 until his retirement in 1970. He became an MP after the death of former MP George Ridley. Following his retirement, his successor, Dennis Skinner, went on to become the longest-serving MP in the Labour Party's history. Neal was Parliamentary Secretary to the Minister of Fuel and Power, Philip Noel-Baker, in 1951.

Parliament of the United Kingdom
Preceded by George Ridley	Member of Parliament for Clay Cross; 1944–1950	Constituency abolished
New constituency	Member of Parliament for Bolsover; 1950–1970	Succeeded by Dennis Skinner
Trade union offices
Preceded by Henry White	Vice-President of the Derbyshire Miners' Association; 1942–1944	Succeeded by Samuel Greenough
