= 1944 Clay Cross by-election =

UK Parliamentary by-election

The 1944 Clay Cross by-election was held on 14 April 1944. The by-election was held due to the death of the incumbent Labour MP, George Ridley. It was won by the Labour candidate Harold Neal.

D. Craven Griffiths, a Liberal who worked for the civil service wanted to stand in the by-election. The President of the Board of Trade refused him permission for a leave of absence to fight a campaign.

Clay Cross by-election, 1944
Party	Candidate	Votes	%	±%
Labour	Harold Neal	13,693	76.3	+1.7
Independent Anti-Fascist	Phil Hicken	2,336	13.0	New
Independent Atlantic Charter	William Douglas-Home	1,911	10.7	New
Majority		11,357	63.3	+14.1
Turnout		17,940		
Labour hold		Swing		
