= Alfred Holland (politician) =

British politician

Alfred Holland (29 January 1900 – 30 August 1936) was a Labour Party politician in England.

He was elected at the 1935 general election as member of parliament (MP) for Clay Cross, filling the seat held by Arthur Henderson until his death shortly before the election. Holland died of meningitis only 9 months after his election to the House of Commons, aged 36.

Parliament of the United Kingdom
Preceded by Arthur Henderson	Member of Parliament for Clay Cross; 1935 – 1936	Succeeded by George Ridley
