= George Ridley (Labour politician) =

British politician (1886–1944)

George Ridley (29 November 1886 – 4 January 1944) was a Labour Party politician in England.

He was elected as the Member of Parliament (MP) for Clay Cross at a by-election in September 1936, filling the vacancy caused by the death of Alfred Holland at the age of 36. He had a wife, Ethel, and they had two children, Philip and Betty. Like his predecessor, Ridley did not live until the next general election but died in January 1944 at 57. At the time of his death he was the Chairman of the National Executive of the Labour Party.

Parliament of the United Kingdom
Preceded by Alfred Holland	Member of Parliament for Clay Cross; 1936 – 1944	Succeeded by Harold Neal
Party political offices
Preceded by Alfred Dobbs	Chair of the Labour Party; 1943–1944	Succeeded by Ellen Wilkinson
