= 1936 Clay Cross by-election =

UK Parliamentary by-election

The 1936 Clay Cross by-election was held on 5 November 1936. The by-election was held due to the death of the incumbent Labour MP, Alfred Holland. It was retained by the Labour candidate George Ridley.

Clay Cross by-election, 1936
Party	Candidate	Votes	%	±%
Labour	George Ridley	24,290	75.1	+0.5
Conservative	Bridget Jackson	8,042	24.9	−0.5
Majority		16,248	50.2	+1.0
Turnout		32,332	72.4	−1.2
Labour hold		Swing	+0.5	
