= Clay Cross (constituency) =

Parliamentary constituency in the United Kingdom, 1918–1950

- Former county constituency for the House of Commons

1918–1950
- Seats: One
- Created from: Chesterfield
- Replaced by: Bolsover and North East Derbyshire

Clay Cross was a county constituency centred on the village of Clay Cross in north-east Derbyshire. It returned one Member of Parliament to the House of Commons of the Parliament of the United Kingdom, elected by the first past the post system.

The constituency was created for the 1918 general election, and abolished for the 1950 general election.

== Boundaries ==
The Urban District of Clay Cross, the Rural District of Blackwell, and part of the Rural District of Chesterfield.

== Members of Parliament ==
Election	Member	Party	Notes
1918	Thomas Broad	Coalition Liberal	
Jan 1922	Thomas Broad	National Liberal	
Nov 1922	Charles Duncan	Labour	Died 1933
1933 by-election	Arthur Henderson	Labour	Died 1935
1935	Alfred Holland	Labour	Died 1936
1936 by-election	George Ridley	Labour	Died 1944
1944 by-election	Harold Neal	Labour	Contested Bolsover following redistribution
1950	constituency abolished		

== Election results ==
=== Elections in the 1910s ===
General election 1918: Clay Cross
Party		Candidate	Votes	%
C	National Liberal	Thomas Broad	7,987	54.1
	Labour	Frank Hall	6,766	45.9
Majority			1,221	8.2
Turnout			14,753	50.6
Registered electors			29,181	
	National Liberal win (new seat)			
C indicates candidate endorsed by the coalition government.

=== Elections in the 1920s ===
General election 1922: Clay Cross
Party	Candidate	Votes	%	±%
Labour	Charles Duncan	13,206	57.9	+12.0
Liberal	Charles Masterman	6,294	27.6	New
National Liberal	Thomas Broad	3,294	14.5	−39.6
Majority		6,912	30.3	N/A
Turnout		22,794	72.1	+21.5
Registered electors		31,611		
Labour gain from National Liberal		Swing	+25.8	

General election 1923: Clay Cross
Party	Candidate	Votes	%	±%
Labour	Charles Duncan	11,939	56.0	−1.9
Unionist	John Sherwood-Kelly	4,881	22.9	New
Liberal	Frank Crane Thornborough	4,488	21.1	−6.5
Majority		7,058	33.1	+2.8
Turnout		21,308	61.4	−10.7
Registered electors		34,729		
Labour hold		Swing	+2.3	

General election 1924: Clay Cross
Party	Candidate	Votes	%	±%
Labour	Charles Duncan	14,618	64.4	+8.4
Unionist	John Sherwood-Kelly	8,069	35.6	+12.7
Majority		6,549	28.8	−4.3
Turnout		22,687	67.2	+5.8
Registered electors		33,737		
Labour hold		Swing	−2.2	

General election 1929: Clay Cross
Party	Candidate	Votes	%	±%
Labour	Charles Duncan	24,480	80.2	+15.8
Unionist	Abraham Lyons	6,055	19.8	−15.8
Majority		18,425	60.4	+31.6
Turnout		30,535	71.8	+4.6
Registered electors		42,557		
Labour hold		Swing	−15.8	

=== Elections in the 1930s ===
General election 1931: Clay Cross
Party	Candidate	Votes	%	±%
Labour	Charles Duncan	21,163	64.6	−15.6
National Liberal	Jacob Weinberg	11,611	35.4	+15.6
Majority		9,552	29.2	−31.2
Turnout		32,774	74.6	+2.8
Labour hold		Swing	−15.6	

1933 Clay Cross by-election
Party	Candidate	Votes	%	±%
Labour	Arthur Henderson	21,931	69.3	+4.7
Conservative	John Moores	6,293	19.9	−15.5
Communist	Harry Pollitt	3,434	10.8	New
Majority		15,638	49.4	+20.2
Turnout		31,658	71.2	−3.4
Labour hold		Swing		

General election 1935: Clay Cross
Party	Candidate	Votes	%	±%
Labour	Alfred Holland	24,590	74.6	+10.0
Conservative	Bridget Jackson	8,391	25.4	−10.0
Majority		16,199	49.2	+20.0
Turnout		32,981	73.6	−1.0
Labour hold		Swing		

1936 Clay Cross by-election
Party	Candidate	Votes	%	±%
Labour	George Ridley	24,290	75.1	+0.5
Conservative	Bridget Jackson	8,042	24.9	−0.5
Majority		16,248	50.2	+1.0
Turnout		32,332	72.4	−1.2
Labour hold		Swing	+0.5	

=== Elections in the 1940s ===
Clay Cross by-election, 1944
Party	Candidate	Votes	%	±%
Labour	Harold Neal	13,693	76.3	+1.7
Independent Anti-Fascist	Phil Hicken	2,336	13.0	New
Independent Atlantic Charter	William Douglas-Home	1,911	10.7	New
Majority		11,357	63.3	+14.1
Turnout		17,940		
Labour hold		Swing		

General election 1945: Clay Cross
Party	Candidate	Votes	%	±%
Labour	Harold Neal	27,538	82.06	
Conservative	William Perkins Bull	6,021	17.94	
Majority		21,517	64.12	
Turnout		33,559	70.82	
Labour hold		Swing		

== Bibliography ==
- Craig, F. W. S. (1983) [1969]. British parliamentary election results 1918–1949 (3rd ed.). Chichester: Parliamentary Research Services. ISBN 0-900178-06-X.
- Leigh Rayment's Historical List of MPs – Constituencies beginning with "C" (part 4)
