= Charles Duncan (politician) =

British Labour Party politician and trade unionist

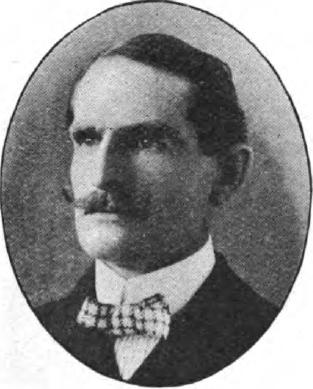
- Duncan in the mid 1900s

Member of Parliament for Barrow-in-Furness
- In office 1906–1918
- Preceded by: Sir Charles Cayzer, 1st Baronet
- Succeeded by: Robert Burton-Chadwick

Member of Parliament for Clay Cross
- In office 1922–1933
- Preceded by: Thomas Broad
- Succeeded by: Arthur Henderson

Personal details
- Born: 8 June 1865 Middlesbrough, England
- Died: 6 July 1933 (aged 68) Hampstead, London, England
- Party: Labour
- Profession: Engineer
- Known for: Trade Unionism

Charles Duncan (8 June 1865 – 6 July 1933) was a British Labour Party politician and trade unionist. He was General Secretary of the Workers' Union from 1900 to 1929. He was Member of Parliament for Barrow-in-Furness from 1906 to 1918, and Member of Parliament for Clay Cross from 1922 to 1933 (his death).

== Early life ==
Duncan was born on 8 June 1865 in Middlesbrough, England. He was the son of a ship's pilot, and was educated at a local church school until the age of 16. He was then apprenticed to the engineering industry, and the Elswick Ordnance factory, Newcastle upon Tyne.

== Career ==
=== Trade unionism ===
Duncan joined Amalgamated Society of Engineers in 1888, and was active in the trade union movement for the rest of his life.

When the Workers Union was founded in 1898 by Tom Mann, Duncan was its first president. In 1900 he was elected secretary of the union, an office he held until 1929. In that year the Workers Union was merged into the Transport and General Workers' Union.

He was honorary president of the National Union of Police and Prison Officers which existed between 1913 and 1918. The police strikes in 1918 and 1919 resulted in the Police Act 1919 which banned police from joining a trade union and from striking.

=== Political career ===
Duncan became a socialist in 1887 and joined the Independent Labour Party in 1895. He began his political career as a local councillor. He was a member of Middlesbrough's town council from 1896 to 1900.

He was elected at the 1906 general election as Member of Parliament (MP) for Barrow-in-Furness. During this period, he served as a whip. He earned the nickname 'Angel of Death' in World War I, because he toured the UK encouraging men to join the military; many of those would have died in the trenches. He held the seat until his narrow defeat at the 1918 general election by the Coalition Conservative candidate.

Duncan attempted unsuccessfully to re-enter the Commons when two by-elections were held in The Wrekin, Shropshire, in quick succession in February and November 1920.

At the 1922 election, he stood in the Derbyshire mining constituency of Clay Cross, winning the seat by a large majority from a divided Liberal Party. He was re-elected at the next four general elections, holding the seat until his death.

== Personal life ==
In 1890, Duncan married Lydia Copeland. They did not have any children.

Duncan had been ill for a number of months, suffering from an illness of the stomach. He died at the Manor House Hospital, Hampstead, London in July 1933. He was aged 68. His wife survived him, and he left a fortune of £3883 10s (equivalent to £35690 in 2025).

Parliament of the United Kingdom
Preceded by Sir Charles Cayzer, Bt.	Member of Parliament for Barrow-in-Furness; 1906 – 1918	Succeeded by Robert Chadwick
Preceded by Thomas Broad	Member of Parliament for Clay Cross; 1922 – 1933	Succeeded by Arthur Henderson
Trade union offices
Preceded by New position	President of the Workers' Union; 1898–1900	Succeeded by Robert Morley
Preceded by Tom Chambers	General Secretary of the Workers' Union; 1900–1929	Succeeded by Office abolished
