= Killingbeck and Seacroft (ward) =

Electoral ward in Leeds, England

- Killingbeck and Seacroft highlighted within Leeds
- Population: 18,297 (2023 electorate)
- Metropolitan borough: City of Leeds
- Metropolitan county: West Yorkshire
- Region: Yorkshire and the Humber
- Country: England
- Sovereign state: United Kingdom
- UK Parliament: Leeds East
- Councillors: Katie Dye (Labour); David Jenkins (Labour); David Dresser (Independent (Note: Elected as Reform UK))

Killingbeck and Seacroft is an electoral ward of Leeds City Council in east Leeds, West Yorkshire, covering both of the outer city suburb areas of Killingbeck and Seacroft and the north west part of Cross Gates.

== Councillors since 1973 ==
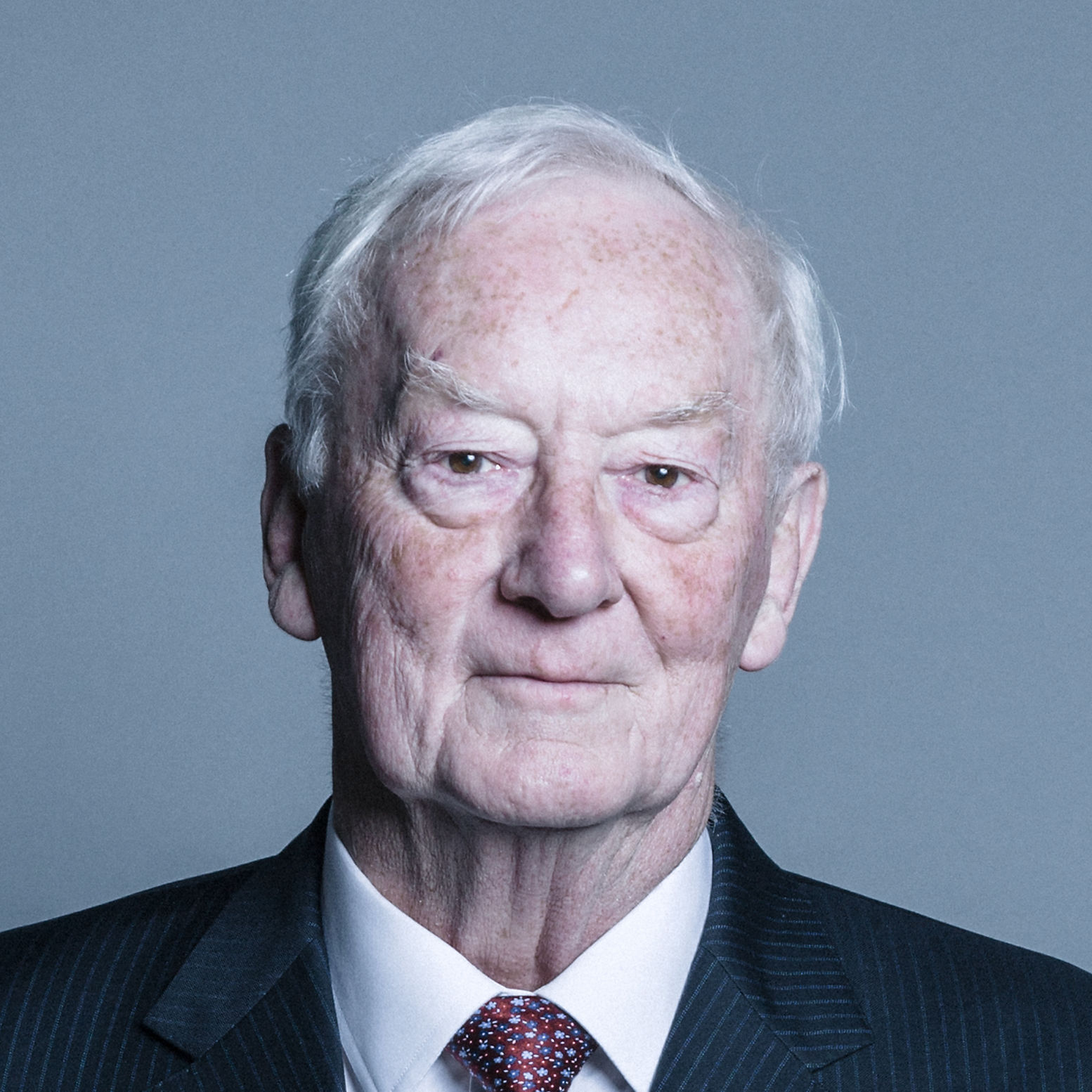
Kenneth Woolmer represented Seacroft ward on the City of Leeds Council (1970-1974) and Leeds City Council (1974-1978). Later Member of Parliament for Batley and Morley (1979-1983).

Election	Councillor	Councillor	Councillor
Seacroft (1973 to 2004)
1973	Kenneth Woolmer (Lab) (Note: Woolmer had previously represented Seacroft as a City of Leeds Councillor since 1970.)	F. Stringer (Lab) (Note: Stringer had previously represented Seacroft as a City of Leeds Councillor since 1972.)	George Mudie (Lab) (Note: Mudie had previously represented Seacroft as a City of Leeds Councillor since 1971.)
1975	Kenneth Woolmer (Lab)	F. Stringer (Lab)	George Mudie (Lab)
1976	Kenneth Woolmer (Lab) (Note: Woolmer would serve as Batley and Morley from 1979 to 1983.)	F. Stringer (Lab)	George Mudie (Lab)
1978	I. Adams (Lab)	F. Stringer (Lab)	George Mudie (Lab)
1979	I. Adams (Lab)	F. Stringer (Lab)	George Mudie (Lab)
1980	Douglas Gabb OBE (Lab) (Note: Gabb previously represented Osmondthorpe from 1954 to 1971 and again between 1974 and 1980. He was elected as an Alderman between 1971 and 1974 and awarded an OBE in the 1975 Birthday Honours.)	Arthur Vollans (Lab)	George Mudie (Lab)
1982	Douglas Gabb OBE (Lab)	Arthur Vollans (Lab)	George Mudie (Lab)
1983	Douglas Gabb OBE (Lab)	Arthur Vollans (Lab)	George Mudie (Lab)
1984	Douglas Gabb OBE (Lab)	Arthur Vollans (Lab)	George Mudie (Lab)
1986	Douglas Gabb OBE (Lab)	Arthur Vollans (Lab)	George Mudie (Lab)
1987	Douglas Gabb OBE (Lab)	Arthur Vollans (Lab)	George Mudie (Lab)
1988	Douglas Gabb OBE (Lab)	Arthur Vollans (Lab)	George Mudie (Lab)
1988	Douglas Gabb OBE (Lab)	Arthur Vollans (Lab)	George Mudie (Lab)
1990	Douglas Gabb OBE (Lab)	Arthur Vollans (Lab)	George Mudie (Lab)
1987	Douglas Gabb OBE (Lab)	Arthur Vollans (Lab)	George Mudie (Lab)
1992	Douglas Gabb OBE (Lab)	Arthur Vollans (Lab)	Graham Hyde (Lab)
1994	Douglas Gabb OBE (Lab)	Arthur Vollans (Lab)	Graham Hyde (Lab)
1995	Douglas Gabb OBE (Lab)	Arthur Vollans (Lab)	Graham Hyde (Lab)
1996	Douglas Gabb OBE (Lab)	Arthur Vollans (Lab)	Graham Hyde (Lab)
1998	Douglas Gabb OBE (Lab)	Arthur Vollans (Lab)	Graham Hyde (Lab)
1999	Brian Selby (Lab)	Arthur Vollans (Lab)	Graham Hyde (Lab)
2000	Brian Selby (Lab)	Arthur Vollans (Lab)	Graham Hyde (Lab)
2002	Brian Selby (Lab)	Michael Davey (Lab)	Graham Hyde (Lab)
2003	Brian Selby (Lab)	Michael Davey (Lab)	Graham Hyde (Lab)
Killingbeck and Seacroft (2004 to present)
2004	Brian Selby (Lab)	Michael Davey (Lab)	Graham Hyde (Lab)
2006	Brian Selby (Lab)	Vonnie Morgan (Lab)	Graham Hyde (Lab)
2007	Brian Selby (Lab)	Vonnie Morgan (Lab)	Graham Hyde (Lab)
2008	Brian Selby (Lab)	Vonnie Morgan (Lab)	Graham Hyde (Lab)
2010	Brian Selby (Lab)	Vonnie Morgan (Lab)	Graham Hyde (Lab)
2011	Brian Selby (Lab)	Vonnie Morgan (Lab)	Graham Hyde (Lab)
2012	Brian Selby (Lab)	Vonnie Morgan (Lab)	Graham Hyde (Lab)
2014	Brian Selby (Lab)	Vonnie Morgan (Lab)	Graham Hyde (Lab)
2015	Brian Selby (Lab)	Catherine Dobson (Lab)	Graham Hyde (Lab)
2016	Brian Selby (Lab)	Catherine Dobson (Lab)	Graham Hyde (Lab)
October 2017	Brian Selby (Lab)	Catherine Dobson (ELI) (Note: Dobson resigned the Labour whip and became Leader of the East Leeds Independents group on the council, joining previous defector and Cross Gates and Whinmoor councillor Janette Walker. The Yorkshire Evening Post quoted Dobson stating, "I am not prepared to stand by while the Labour Council withdraws basic services to my community while bankrolling vanity projects”.)	Graham Hyde (Lab)
2018	Paul Drinkwater (Lab)	David Jenkins (Lab)	Katie Dye (Lab)
2019	Paul Drinkwater (Lab)	David Jenkins (Lab)	Katie Dye (Lab)
2021	Paul Drinkwater (Lab)	David Jenkins (Lab)	Katie Dye (Lab)
May 2021	Paul Drinkwater (Ind) (Note: Days after the 2021 council election, Drinkwater resigned from the Labour Party on 10 May, citing "institutionalised bullying" in the ruling Labour council group and argued for a change to the council's decision-making structures. He did not stand for re-election in 2022.)	David Jenkins (Lab)	Katie Dye (Lab)
2022	John Tudor (Lab)	David Jenkins (Lab)	Katie Dye (Lab)
2023	John Tudor (Lab)	David Jenkins (Lab)	Katie Dye (Lab)
2024	John Tudor (Lab)	David Jenkins (Lab)	Katie Dye (Lab)
2026	David Dresser (RUK)	David Jenkins (Lab)	Katie Dye (Lab)
October 2026	David Dresser* (Ind) (Note: In October 2026, Dresser sat as part of the Leeds First Independents group with Cllr Paula-Jane Thackray, but following Thackray's resignation from the council later that month, Dresser now sits as an independent.)	David Jenkins* (Lab)	Katie Dye* (Lab)

indicates seat up for re-election. indicates seat up for election following resignation or death of sitting councillor. indicates councillor defection. * indicates incumbent councillor.

== Elections since 2010 ==
=== May 2026 ===
2026
Party	Candidate	Votes	%	±%
Reform	David Dresser	2,371	41.1	+30.6
Labour	John Tudor*	1794	31.1	−30.2
Green	Nosheen Majid	899	15.6	+5.8
Conservative	Rosemary Gaskell	446	7.7	−3.9
Liberal Democrats	Ben Turner-Chastney	214	3.7	−0.7
SDP	Thomas Foster	50	0.9	−1.6
Majority		577	10.0	−39.7
Turnout		5774	31.3	+8.6
Reform gain from Labour		Swing	+30.4	

=== May 2024 ===
2024
Party	Candidate	Votes	%	±%
Labour	David Jenkins*	2,551	61.3	−2.8
Conservative	Rosemary Gaskell	481	11.6	−6.1
Reform	Jayne Dresser	435	10.5	New
Green	John Arnison	407	9.8	+0.1
Liberal Democrats	John Otley	183	4.4	−3.3
SDP	Catherine Dobson	106	2.5	New
Majority		2,070	49.7	+3.3
Turnout		4,190	22.7	+1.9
Labour hold		Swing	+1.7	

=== May 2023 ===
2023
Party	Candidate	Votes	%	±%
Labour	Katie Dye*	2,446	64.1	+2.7
Conservative	Bradley Chandler	676	17.7	−2.0
Green	David Anthoney	369	9.7	+2.5
Liberal Democrats	John Otley	295	7.7	+2.1
Majority		1,770	46.4	+4.5
Turnout		3,814	20.8	−1.8
Labour hold		Swing		

=== May 2022 ===
2022
Party	Candidate	Votes	%	±%
Labour	John Tudor	2,510	61.7	−0.3
Conservative	Cormac Trigg	803	19.7	−4.4
Green	David Anthoney	293	7.2	−1.0
Liberal Democrats	John Otley	229	5.6	+1.9
Freedom Alliance	Suzanne Harbourne	122	3.0	N/A
TUSC	Iain Dalton	96	2.3	+2.2
Majority		1,707	41.9	+4.0
Turnout		4,071	22.6%	−4.0
Labour hold		Swing		

=== May 2021 ===
2021
Party	Candidate	Votes	%	±%
Labour	David Jenkins*	2,946	62.0	+15.7
Conservative	David Frame	1,145	24.1	+14.1
Green	Alan Anthoney	391	8.2	+2.2
Liberal Democrats	John Otley	174	3.7	N/A
SDP	Hafizur Rahman	32	0.1	N/A
Majority		1,801	37.9	+9.4
Turnout		4,755	26.6	+4.4
Labour hold		Swing		

=== May 2019 ===
2019
Party	Candidate	Votes	%	±%
Labour	Katie Dye*	1,751	46.3	−5.3
East Leeds Independents	Catherine Dobson	672	17.8	−1.3
UKIP	Peter Morgan	579	15.3	+15.3
Conservative	Andrew Martin	378	10.0	−1.7
Green	Colin Noble	227	6.0	−5.7
Yorkshire	Matthew Clover	131	3.5	−6.7
For Britain	Adam Ramoth	41	1.1	+1.1
Majority		1,079	28.5	−4.0
Turnout		3,802	22.2	−3.5
Labour hold		Swing	-2.0	

=== May 2018 ===
2018
Party	Candidate	Votes	%	±%
Labour	Paul Drinkwater	2,718	51.6	−10.7
Labour	David Jenkins	2,602		
Labour	Katie Dye	2,585		
East Leeds Independents	Catherine Dobson*	1,005	19.1	N/A
Conservative	Marilyn Coen	619	11.7	+2.1
Yorkshire	John Otley	538	10.2	+7.7
Conservative	Anne Palmer	478		
Conservative	Fiona Robertson	445		
Liberal Democrats	Kate Langwick	389	7.4	+3.7
Majority		1,713	32.5	−11.5
Turnout		16,989	25.7	−2.1
Labour hold		Swing		
Labour hold		Swing		
Labour hold		Swing		

=== May 2016 ===
2016
Party	Candidate	Votes	%	±%
Labour	Graham Hyde*	2,811	62.3	+7.5
UKIP	Steve Leak	828	18.3	−5.3
Conservative	Elizabeth Hayes	431	9.5	−4.6
Liberal Democrats	Adam Douglas	166	3.7	+0.2
Green	Jaimes Moran	124	2.7	−1.3
Yorkshire First	John Otley	111	2.5	+2.5
TUSC	Iain Dalton	44	1.0	+1.0
Majority		1983	44.0	+12.8
Turnout		4,515	27.8	
Labour hold		Swing		

=== May 2015 ===
2015
Party	Candidate	Votes	%	±%
Labour	Catherine Dobson	4,792	54.8	−18.7
UKIP	Phil Moore	2,061	23.6	+23.6
Conservative	Beatrice Greenwood	1,235	14.1	−2.5
Green	Louise Winrow	350	4.0	+4.0
Liberal Democrats	Joanne Binns	304	3.5	−6.4
Majority		2,731	31.2	−25.8
Turnout		8,742	53.2	
Labour hold		Swing	21.2	

=== May 2014 ===
2014
Party	Candidate	Votes	%	±%
Labour	Brian Selby*	2,927		
Conservative	Dorothy Flynn	623		
Green	Louise Richardson	617		
Liberal Democrats	Joanne Binns	311		
Majority		2,304		
Turnout			29.2	
Labour hold		Swing		

=== May 2012 ===
2012
Party	Candidate	Votes	%	±%
Labour	Graham Hyde*	3,240	73.8	+0.3
English Democrat	Sam Kelly	487	11.1	+11.1
Conservative	Elizabeth Hayes	439	10.0	−6.6
Liberal Democrats	Harriet Chapman	223	5.1	−4.8
Majority		2,753	62.7	+5.7
Turnout		4,389		
Labour hold		Swing	+3.4	

=== May 2011 ===
2011
Party	Candidate	Votes	%	±%
Labour	Veronica Morgan*	3,761	73.5	+19.5
Conservative	William Flynn	847	16.6	−0.1
Liberal Democrats	Joanne Binns	508	9.9	−6.8
Majority		2,914	57.0	+19.7
Turnout		5,116	31	
Labour hold		Swing	+9.8	

=== May 2010 ===
2010
Party	Candidate	Votes	%	±%
Labour	Brian Selby*	4,711	54.0	+4.2
Liberal Democrats	Joanne Binns	1,459	16.7	+6.5
Conservative	William Flynn	1,450	16.6	+1.8
BNP	Bernard Allen	962	11.0	−3.0
Alliance for Green Socialism	Simon Fearn	147	1.7	−0.7
Majority		3,252	37.3	+2.3
Turnout		8,729	52.8	+21.4
Labour hold		Swing	+1.1	

== See also ==
- Listed buildings in Seacroft and Killingbeck
