= 1939 Batley and Morley by-election =

UK parliamentary by-election

← 1935	9 March 1939	1945 →

Constituency of Batley and Morley
- Turnout: 72.6% (▼6.7%)
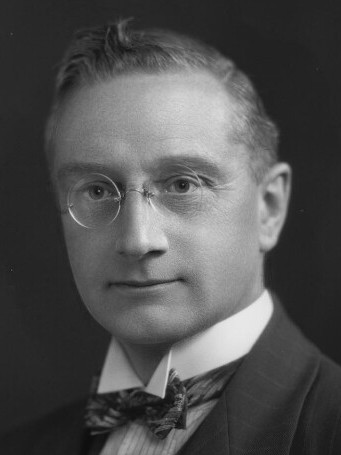
	First party	Second party
		Con
Candidate	Hubert Beaumont	Wilfrid Wills
Party	Labour	Conservative
Popular vote	20,020	16,124
Percentage	55.4%	44.6%
Swing	▲1.8%	▼1.8%
MP before election
Willie Brooke
Labour
Elected MP
Hubert Beaumont
Labour

The 1939 Batley and Morley by-election was a parliamentary by-election held in the United Kingdom on 9 March 1939 for the House of Commons constituency of Batley and Morley in the West Riding of Yorkshire.

== Vacancy ==
The Labour Party MP for the seat Willie Brooke died on 21 January 1939 at the age of 44. He had been the MP since the 1935 general election.

== Electoral history ==
This was a traditional Labour/Liberal marginal until 1931 when no Liberal candidate stood and a Conservative won for the first time in the National Government landslide. Brooke comfortably regained the seat at the last election;

General election 14 November 1935: Batley and Morley Electorate
Party	Candidate	Votes	%	±%
Labour	Willie Brooke	21,182	53.6	+14.8
Conservative	Wilfrid Wills	18,354	46.4	−14.8
Majority		2,828	7.2	N/A
Turnout		39,536	79.3	−6.6
Labour gain from Conservative		Swing		

== Candidates ==
- The Labour Party selected Hubert Beaumont to defend the seat. From 1914 to 1925, Beaumont was a member of Derbyshire County Council. He began fighting Parliamentary seats at Aldershot in the 1924 general election, and Harrow in the 1929 general election. In the 1931 general election he was chosen for the winnable seat of Peckham where the sitting MP John Beckett had split from the Labour Party. Beaumont was elected to Yiewsley and West Drayton Urban District Council in 1934.
- The Conservative Party re-selected 41-year-old Wilfrid Dewhurst Wills from Bath. He had gained the seat from Labour at the 1931 general election before losing the seat back to Labour at the 1935 general election.
- The Liberal Party already had a prospective parliamentary candidate in place before the vacancy occurred. They had selected Ernest E Dalton, who had contested Sheffield Park at the 1929 general election, but had not fought a parliamentary election since. He was a retired police officer who became the Business Manager of the Leeds Art Centre. Dalton was a supporter of the Popular Front that was being advocated by leading Labour Party politician Sir Stafford Cripps. Cripps argued that the best way of rallying support against the National Government's Nazi appeasement policy was for the Labour and Liberal Parties to support joint candidates. To this end, Dalton said that he was prepared to withdraw his candidature for the by-election if the Labour Party candidate also withdrew, to support a Popular Front candidate standing as an Independent Progressive. Dalton even suggested a potential candidate, the author J. B. Priestley. Priestley had recently said that he would be prepared to seek election to Parliament as an Independent Progressive.

== Result ==
The Labour Party held the seat with an increased majority.

1939 Batley and Morley by-election Electorate 49,757
Party	Candidate	Votes	%	±%
Labour	Hubert Beaumont	20,020	55.4	+1.8
Conservative	Wilfrid Wills	16,124	44.6	−1.8
Majority		3,896	10.8	+3.6
Turnout		36,144	72.6	−6.7
Labour hold		Swing		

== Aftermath ==
In the 1945 general election,

General election 1945: Batley and Morley
Party	Candidate	Votes	%	±%
Labour	Hubert Beaumont	22,682	58.1	+2.7
Conservative	G W Hirst	11,090	28.4	−16.2
Liberal	Ashley Mitchell	5,256	13.5	New
Majority		11,592	29.7	+18.9
Turnout		39,028	80.9	+8.3
Labour hold		Swing		
