= Kenneth Woolmer, Baron Woolmer of Leeds =

British politician (born 1940)

The Right Honourable The Lord Woolmer of Leeds
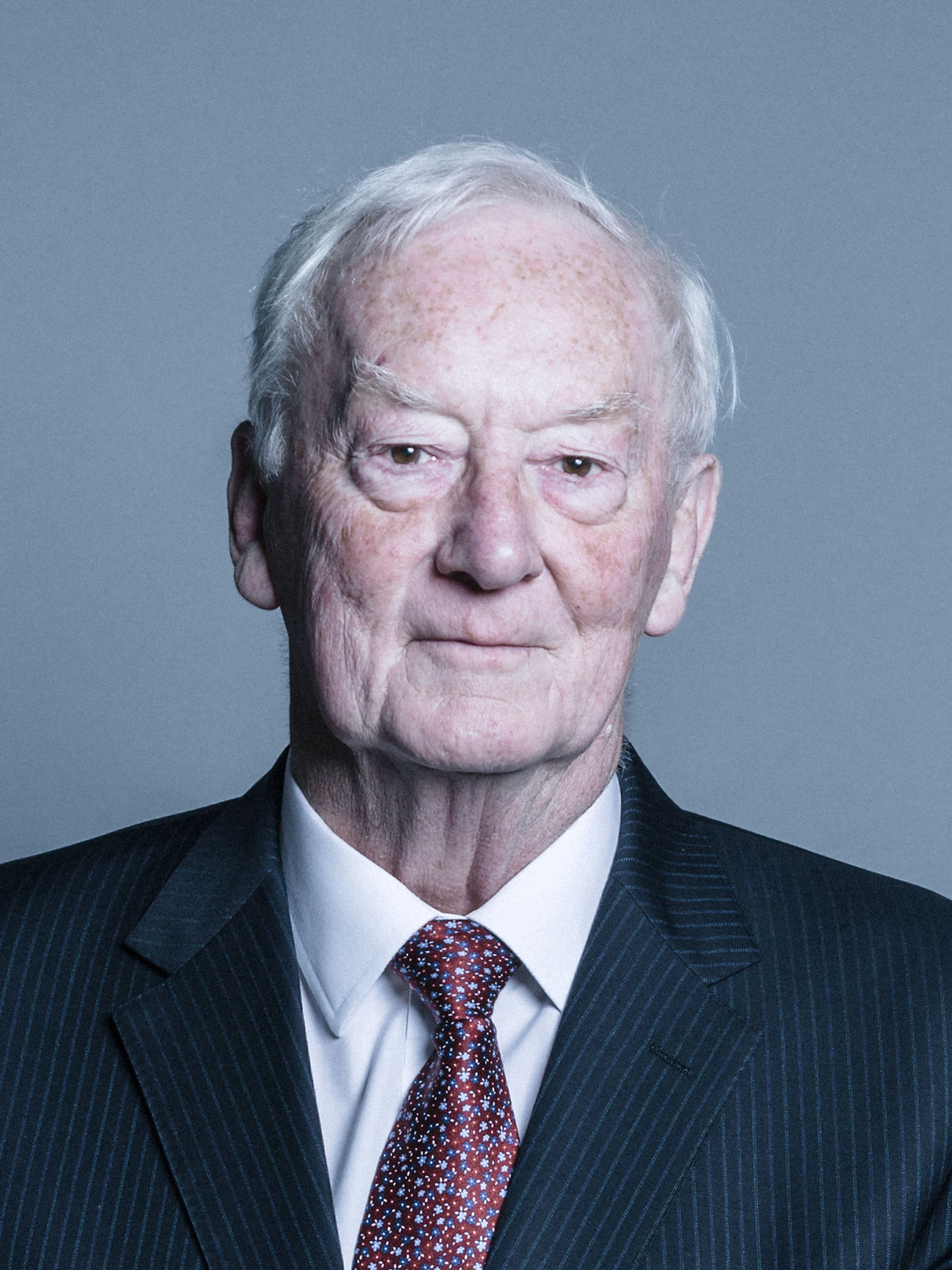

Member of Parliament for Batley and Morley
- In office 3 May 1979 – 13 May 1983
- Preceded by: Sir Alfred Broughton
- Succeeded by: Constituency abolished

Member of the House of Lords
- Lord Temporal
- Life peerage 3 August 1999 – 26 May 2020

Leeds City Councillor for Seacroft Ward
- In office 1970–1978
- Succeeded by: I. Adams

Personal details
- Born: Kenneth John Woolmer; 25 April 1940 (age 86)
- Education: University of Leeds

Kenneth John Woolmer, Baron Woolmer of Leeds (born 25 April 1940) is a British university lecturer and politician. Coming into politics through local government in West Yorkshire, Woolmer was elected to Parliament for the Labour Party in 1979. He became an effective Parliamentarian and was rapidly promoted, despite clearly allying to the party's right-wing and playing an active role in the intra-party conflict. Partly due to adverse boundary changes, he lost his seat in 1983 and was unable to win it back. Later in life he received a life peerage and was an active member of the House of Lords.

== Early career ==
Woolmer was the son of Joseph Woolmer, and was educated at Kettering Grammar School, moving on to the University of Leeds where he received a Bachelor of Arts degree in economics; after graduating he became a university lecturer at Leeds. His political career began in 1970 when he was elected as a Labour Party candidate to Leeds city council, of which he was deputy leader from 1972. In 1973 Woolmer was elected to the new Leeds city council and to West Yorkshire county council which had been created as part of local government reorganisation. At the 1970 Labour Party conference, Woolmer (as the delegate from Leeds North West Constituency Labour Party) seconded a motion calling for abolition of all private medicine. That year he fought Leeds North West at the general election, coming second.

== West Yorkshire county council ==
As deputy leader and chairman of the planning and transport committee of West Yorkshire county council, Woolmer announced in July 1974 the beginning of a campaign for industrial and commercial development. In 1976 he called for Government support for electronics industries which were locating in West Yorkshire, after a Rank Radio factory made 200 workers redundant. Woolmer was chairman of the planning and transportation committee of the Association of Metropolitan Authorities from 1974 to 1977, and later became Leader of West Yorkshire county council.

== 1979 election ==
By the late summer of 1976, Woolmer had been selected to follow Dr Alfred Broughton as Labour Party candidate for Batley and Morley. Broughton suffered prolonged ill health during the later stages of the Parliament but did not resign his seat; he died just as the 1979 general election campaign began. Woolmer was elected with a majority of 5,352. In Parliament Woolmer specialised in issues affecting the economy and industry. He became a member of the Select Committee on the Treasury and Civil Service when it was set up, and chaired the Parliamentary Labour Party finance and economic committee in 1980–81.

== Economic policy ==
In responding to the recession of the early 1980s, Woolmer pressed the Government to use the proceeds of North Sea oil to build up manufacturing industry, and he challenged Margaret Thatcher to accept that her policies were causing a divide between the industrial north and the prosperous south. He attacked the 1981 budget as "savagely deflationary", asserting that it would "pile agony on to injury". Woolmer also took up the cause of civil servants' pay, urging the Government to take the matter to arbitration.

== Solidarity ==
After a special conference of the Labour Party endorsed an electoral college for future elections of the party leader, Woolmer signed a statement deploring the outcome. He volunteered as Secretary of Solidarity, a group which campaigned against the far left within the Labour Party and to stop further defections to the Social Democratic Party. Leader of the Opposition Michael Foot promoted Woolmer to the front bench as junior spokesman on trade, prices and consumer protection from November 1981; it was noted that he was not a left-winger in Labour Party terms. Woolmer joined a pressure group called "Forward Labour" which was set up in 1982 calling for evidence of Militant tendency infiltration of the Labour Party to be published, with a view to expelling their members.

In his front bench role, Woolmer pressed the Government not to allow British Airways (then in state ownership) to sell off profitable subsidiaries, which he believed to be a prelude to its privatisation.

== Defeat ==
When Woolmer came up for re-election at the 1983 general election, his constituency was divided in boundary changes and Woolmer stood for the new Batley and Spen seat which was less favourable for the Labour Party. After a close fight, Woolmer lost the seat by 870 votes to the Conservative Elizabeth Peacock. His loss from the House of Commons was described as "unexpected" by Gerald Kaufman, who particularly regretted it because Woolmer "had developed an impressive expertise in trade policy".

Woolmer had been the principal of Halton Gill Associates, consultants on central and local government, since 1979. In 1985 Woolmer was reselected to try to gain Batley and Spen back from the Conservatives. At the 1987 general election, he was again defeated as the Conservatives slightly increased their majority; it was speculated that a large personal vote for the sitting Conservative MP had kept the seat in her hands.

== Subsequent business career ==
In 1991 Woolmer became Director of MBA Programmes for Leeds University; he also served as a director of Leeds United F.C. from 1991 to 1996. He was briefly Dean of External Relations for the university in 1997 before becoming Dean of the School of Business and Economic Studies; he oversaw the creation of a separate Leeds University Business School before leaving in 2000. He has been a partner in Anderson McGraw since 2001 and was a non-executive director of Thornfield Developments Ltd from 1999 to 2002, among other business appointments. Woolmer was created a Life Peer as Baron Woolmer of Leeds, of Leeds in the County of West Yorkshire in the Peerage of the United Kingdom on 3 August 1999. He sat in the House of Lords until his retirement on 26 May 2020.

== Arms ==
Coat of arms of Kenneth Woolmer, Baron Woolmer of Leeds
Coronet Coronet of a Baron Crest A Sea-ram couchant Argent armed unguled and tailed Or the piscine parts Vert Escutcheon Chequy of twelve three by four Or and Argent issuing from the base of each chequer a Billet Vert four Roses in pale Argent barbed and seeded Or Supporters On either side an Owl guardant wings elevated and addorsed Argent crowned beaked and clawed Or Motto Et Augebitur Scientia Badge Four Escallops in cross Argent flukes inwards surmounted by a Ram's Head caboshed Vert armed Or

Parliament of the United Kingdom
Preceded by Sir Alfred Broughton	Member of Parliament for Batley and Morley; 1979–1983	Constituency abolished
Orders of precedence in the United Kingdom
Preceded by The Lord Sharman	Gentlemen; Baron Woolmer of Leeds	Followed by The Lord MacKenzie of Culkein
