= General Union of Textile Workers =

Former trade union of the United Kingdom

- Merged into: National Union of Textile Workers
- Founded: 1881
- Dissolved: 1922
- Headquarters: 1 Kirkgate Buildings, Kirkgate, Huddersfield
- Location: United Kingdom
- Members: 64,000 (1918)
- Key people: Allen Gee (Gen Sec)
- Affiliations: TUC, Labour

The General Union of Textile Workers was a trade union representing textile workers in England, most of its members being weavers in the West Riding of Yorkshire.

== History ==
The union was founded in 1881 following a strike at Newsome Mills in Huddersfield. Initially known as the Huddersfield and District Power Loom Weavers' Association, it led a major strike of 4,000 weavers for thirteen weeks in 1883. The strike was ultimately defeated; although a pay scale was agreed, this was a maximum rate, and mills could pay lower rates. The union added "Woollen Operatives" to its name, gradually attracting a more diverse membership. It also began accepting members elsewhere in the West Riding, and in 1894 became the West Riding of Yorkshire Power Loom Weavers' Association, with membership over 3,000.

Allen Gee became the union's general secretary in 1888. Under his leadership, it survived through a decline to only 2,300 members in 1898, and changed its name to the General Union of Weavers and Textile Workers the following year. Now seeing itself as an industrial union accepting as members all workers in the industry, this marked the start of rapid growth. Membership rose to 4,500 in 1910, of which almost half were women - unusual for a union of the period - then to 13,400 in 1914, when it became the "General Union of Textile Workers", and 64,000 by 1918.

In 1922, the union merged with the National Society of Dyers and Finishers and the Yeadon, Guiseley and District Factory Workers' Union, forming the National Union of Textile Workers.

== Election results ==
The union sponsored Ben Turner as a Labour Party candidate in several Parliament elections, and from 1922 he served as a Member of Parliament.

Election	Constituency	Candidate	Votes	Percentage	Position
1908 by-election	Dewsbury	Ben Turner	2,446	20.2	3
1918 general election	Batley and Morley	Ben Turner	12,051	47.1	2
1922 general election	Batley and Morley	Ben Turner	15,005	46.2	1

== General Secretaries ==
1881: Albert Shaw
1888: Allen Gee
