= National Union of Textile Workers =

Former trade union of the United Kingdom

- Merged into: National Union of Dyers, Bleachers and Textile Workers
- Founded: 1922
- Dissolved: 1936
- Headquarters: 84 Godwin Street, Bradford
- Location: United Kingdom
- Members: 65,496 (1926)
- Key people: Ben Turner (Gen Pres); Arthur Shaw (Gen Sec)
- Affiliations: TUC, Labour

The National Union of Textile Workers was a trade union representing workers in the textile industry in England, principally in the area of Yorkshire.

== History ==
The union was founded in 1922 when the General Union of Textile Workers merged with the National Society of Dyers and Finishers and the Yeadon, Guiseley and District Factory Workers' Union. By the end of 1923, it had 52,876 members, and this rose rapidly, reaching 65,496 three years later. However, it was hit heavily by job losses during the Great Depression and disputes between different sections of workers, the small Pattern Weavers' Society splitting away in 1930.

By 1933, membership of the union had fallen to only 36,000. Ben Turner, who had been involved with the union and its predecessor for many years, resigned as General President, and it was agreed that future presidents would not work on a full-time salaried basis.

For many years, the union was a member of the Federation of Unions in the Bleaching, Dyeing, Finishing, and Calico Printing Trades, working with the Amalgamated Society of Dyers, Bleachers and Kindred Trades, and the Operative Bleachers, Dyers and Finishers Association. The federation increasingly took the lead on negotiations with employers on pay and conditions. In 1936, the three unions voted to merge, forming the National Union of Dyers, Bleachers and Textile Workers.

== Election results ==
The union sponsored a Labour Party candidate at each Parliamentary election, with Turner twice winning election.

Election	Constituency	Candidate	Votes	Percentage	Position
1923 general election	Batley and Morley	Ben Turner	14,964	52.6	1
1924 general election	Batley and Morley	Ben Turner	15,966	49.4	2
1929 general election	Batley and Morley	Ben Turner	23,621	58.3	1
1931 general election	Batley and Morley	Ben Turner	16,700	38.8	2
1935 general election	Bradford East	Wilfred Heywood	7,329	21.7	3

== Officials ==
=== General Presidents ===
1922: Ben Turner
1933: Clement Naylor
1935: F. W. Sowerby

=== General Secretaries ===
1922: Arthur Shaw
