= William Rushworth (trade unionist) =

British trade unionist

William Rushworth (1879 – 11 November 1929) was a British trade unionist.

Born in Bradford, Rushworth became a dyers' labourer in Brighouse. He joined the Amalgamated Society of Dyers, becoming president of its Brighouse branch in 1907, and branch secretary in 1909. He also joined the Independent Labour Party and won election to the local council, representing Southowram.

In 1911, Rushworth relocated to Scotland, to become the full-time Scottish District Secretary of the union, and during World War I, he served on the Wool Council, representing Scottish textiles.

In 1919, Rushworth was elected as general secretary of the union, relocating to Bradford. He also became vice chair of the National Association of Unions in the Textile Trade. In 1923, he was elected to Bradford City Council, serving for three years.

On 11 November 1929, Rushworth was addressing a meeting at the Bradford Trades Hall, when he collapsed and died.

Trade union offices
Preceded by Joseph Hayhurst	General Secretary of the Amalgamated Society of Dyers; 1919–1929	Succeeded by Edward Verity
