= Eddie Haigh =

British trade unionist (1935–2016)

Edward Haigh (7 November 1935 – 17 February 2016) was a British trade unionist.

Haigh grew up in Birstall, then in the West Riding of Yorkshire, and was educated at St Mary's Roman Catholic School in Batley. He became a carpet weaver in 1956, and joined the National Union of Dyers, Bleachers and Textile Workers (NUDBTW). He was chosen as a shop steward four years later, then, in 1969, became a full-time district organiser for the union.

In 1973, Haigh became a district secretary for the NUDBTW, and in 1977, he was appointed as its National Organiser, also leading on negotiations on pay and conditions for members. In 1979, he was elected as the union's Assistant General Secretary, but the NUDBTW decided to merge into the Transport and General Workers' Union (TGWU) in 1982. He was appointed as secretary of the TGWU's new dyers, bleacher and textile workers group, and was also elected to the General Council of the Trades Union Congress (TUC), although he served only one year before it was reorganised. The TUC decided that the textile workers could no longer be represented separately from the rest of the TGWU, and Haigh therefore left the council.

From 1982 until 1991, Haigh served on the National Executive Committee of the Labour Party. He was loosely associated with the party's left wing, although he voted for the expulsion of the committee of Militant. He chaired the party's important Finance and General Purposes Committee from 1986, In 1992, he chaired the party's annual conference.

In 1985, Haigh was appointed as Assistant General Secretary of the TGWU, serving until he took early retirement, in 1991.

Trade union offices
Preceded by Bill Maddocks	Textiles Group member of the General Council of the Trades Union Congress; 1982–1983	Succeeded by Council reorganised
Preceded by New position	Secretary of the Textiles Group of the Transport and General Workers' Union; 1982–1985	Succeeded by Peter Booth
Preceded by Position vacant	Assistant General Secretary of the Transport and General Workers' Union; 1985–1991; With: Larry Smith (1985–1988)	Succeeded by Position vacant?
