= Allen Gee =

British trade unionist and politician

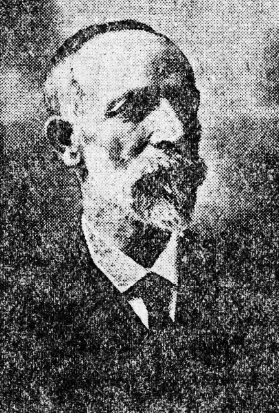
Gee in 1910

Allen Gee (6 September 1852 – 12 August 1939) was a British trade unionist and politician.

== Professional background ==
Gee worked in the woolen industry in Huddersfield, and was involved in a major, but unsuccessful, strike in 1883. This experience inspired him to found what became the General Union of Textile Workers, with membership from the wider district. In 1885, he was elected as the first president of the Huddersfield Trades Council. He was a strong supporter of the Weavers' campaign for an eight-hour day, launched in 1886, and was involved in the Manningham Mills Strike. In 1888, he was elected as General Secretary of the West Yorkshire Power-Loom Weavers Association (later to become the Textile Workers), a position which he held until 1922.

== Unions ==
Gee attended the founding conference of the Independent Labour Party. He was soon elected as an independent labor member of Huddersfield Town Council, although the Liberal Party attempted to claim that he was a supporter of their group. In 1900, he was elected to the first Executive of the Labour Representation Committee (LRC), and he was also appointed as one of the organization's first trustees. He served as the second Chairman of the National Executive Committee, in 1901, although he did not chair the annual conference. From 1910 until 1912, he was chairman of the General Federation of Trade Unions, while at the 1918 general election, he stood unsuccessfully for the Labour Party in Blackpool.

In later life, Gee became a Justice of the Peace, and remained close to his fellow trade unionist Ben Turner. When the Huddersfield Trades Council celebrated its fiftieth anniversary, in 1935, Gee marched at the head of the celebratory parade.

Party political offices
Preceded by William Charles Steadman	Chair of the Labour National Executive Committee; 1901–1902	Succeeded by John Hodge
Trade union offices
Preceded by Albert Shaw	General Secretary of the General Union of Textile Workers; 1888–1922	Succeeded by Position abolished
Preceded by David Gilmour and William Mosses	Trades Union Congress representative to the American Federation of Labour; 1906; With: Joseph Nicholas Bell	Succeeded by John Hodge and David Shackleton
Preceded by Pete Curran	Chairman of the General Federation of Trade Unions; 1910 – 1912	Succeeded by James O'Grady
