= Leonard Sharp =

Leonard Sharp may refer to:

- Leonard Sharp (actor)
- Leonard Sharp (doctor)
- Leonard Sharp (trade unionist)
