= George Bagnall =

British trade unionist

George Henry Bagnall CBE (21 May 1883 – 9 March 1964) was a British trade unionist.

Born in Pendleton near Salford, Bagnall worked as a coal miner for seven years before becoming a dyer in the textile industry. He joined the Amalgamated Society of Dyers, Finishers and Kindred Trades, serving as General Secretary from 1933 to 1936, negotiating the merger which formed the National Union of Dyers, Bleachers and Textile Workers. Bagnall was elected as the new union's general secretary three years later, and subsequently also became secretary of the National Association of Unions in the Textile Trade.

Bagnall was also active in the Labour Party, and stood for the party in High Peak at the 1929 and 1931 general elections. He took less than 30% of the vote on each occasion and did not come close to election.

In 1939, Bagnall was elected to the General Council of the Trades Union Congress (TUC), and he led a TUC delegation to Greece in 1945/46. He was made a Commander of the Order of the British Empire in 1947, and retired from his trade union posts the following year.

In retirement, Bagnall chaired the East & West Ridings Regional Board for Industry, and led a trade mission to Pakistan for the Labour government in 1950.

Trade union offices
Preceded by Edward Verity	General Secretary of the Amalgamated Society of Dyers, Finishers and Kindred Trades; 1933 – 1936	Succeeded by Position abolished
Preceded by Arthur Shaw	General Secretary of the National Union of Dyers, Bleachers and Textile Workers; 1939 – 1948	Succeeded by Wilfred Heywood
Preceded by Arthur Shaw	Textiles Group representative on the General Council of the Trades Union Congress; 1939 – 1948	Succeeded by Wilfred Heywood
