= Leonard Oakes =

British trade unionist and politician

Leonard Oakes (1905 – 1985) was a British trade unionist, politician, and co-operative activist.

Born in Lancaster, Oakes received an elementary education before leaving the city to work as a clerk in a lawyer's office. When he was 20, he returned to Lancaster, working in the process department of a dyeing company. He joined the Operative Bleachers, Dyers and Finishers Association (the "Bolton Amalgamation"), soon becoming secretary of its local branch, then serving on its national executive.

Oakes continued his education, with the Workers' Educational Association, and the National Council of Labour Colleges, and this inspired him to join the Independent Labour Party, and the co-operative movement. He won a seat on Lancaster City Council, representing the Labour Party, and also stood unsuccessfully in Royton in the 1935 UK general election, sponsored by his union.

In 1936, the Bolton Amalgamation became part of the new National Union of Dyers, Bleachers and Textile Workers, with Oakes continuing to serve on the executive, then as president of the union in 1939/40. He resigned in 1941 to begin working for the Labour Department of the Co-operative Union, relocating to Manchester. In 1949, he became the organisation's assistant labour adviser, then its labour adviser in 1954, retiring in 1969. In 1965, he represented the Co-operative Union at the Trades Union Congress, and was awarded the Gold Badge of Congress in recognition of his service.
