= Arthur Shaw (trade unionist) =

Arthur Shaw (1880 – 21 February 1939) was a British trade union leader.

Shaw worked as a dyer and was active in the National Society of Dyers and Finishers from his teenage years. He was elected as general secretary of the union in 1910. In the role, he promoted mergers with other craft unions in the field, which produced the National Union of Textile Workers and ultimately the National Union of Dyers, Bleachers and Textile Workers, Shaw remaining general secretary.

Shaw was appointed to various government committees, including the Advisory Committee of the Board of Trade, and was made a Commander of the Order of the British Empire.

Shaw was also active at the Trades Union Congress (TUC), serving on the General Council of the TUC, and in 1930 was its delegate to the American Federation of Labour. He was also prominent in the International Federation of Textile Workers, and in 1938, when Tom Shaw died, Shaw was appointed as acting secretary of the International Federation. However, he himself caught pneumonia early in 1939 and died unexpectedly.

Trade union offices
| Preceded by Alfred Heaton | General Secretary of the National Society of Dyers and Finishers; 1910–1922 | Succeeded by Position abolished |
| Preceded by Ben Turner | Textiles representative on the General Council of the Trades Union Congress; 1929 – 1939 | Succeeded by George Bagnall |
| Preceded by James Bell and James Thomas Brownlie | Trades Union Congress representative to the American Federation of Labour; 1930; With: Allan Findlay | Succeeded by John Beard and Frank Wolstencroft |
| Preceded by New position | General Secretary of the National Union of Dyers, Bleachers and Textile Workers; 1936 – 1939 | Succeeded by George Bagnall |
| Preceded by Tom Shaw | Acting General Secretary of the International Federation of Textile Workers' Associations; 1938–1939 | Succeeded by James Stott |
