= Wilfred Heywood =

British trade unionist

Wilfred Lanceley Heywood OBE (11 September 1900 – 8 October 1977) was a British trade unionist.

Born in Wooldale, near Holmfirth in Yorkshire, Heywood attended the Wooldale Council School before becoming active in the National Union of Textile Workers; he was elected to its executive in 1930.

He stood as the Labour Party candidate in Bradford East at the 1935 United Kingdom general election, with the backing of the union. His candidacy was controversial, as Frederick William Jowett, the former Labour MP for the seat, also stood, as an Independent Labour Party (ILP) candidate, and the ILP had a long tradition in the local labour movement. Jowett beat Heywood, who took third place with 21.7% of the vote, and was widely considered to have taken enough votes from Jowett to enable a Conservative Party victory.

The National Union of Textile Workers became part of the National Union of Dyers, Bleachers and Textile Workers in 1936, and Heywood remained prominent, being elected as General Secretary in 1948, and also taking a seat on the General Council of the Trades Union Congress. He also served on the British Wool Marketing Board and the Monopolies Commission, but stood down from all his position in 1957, to take a seat on the Restrictive Practices Court. In 1968, he moved to the National Board for Prices and Incomes, then in 1970 returned to the Court before finally retiring in 1971.

Heywood was made an Officer of the Order of the British Empire in the 1951 New Year Honours, and a Commander in the 1958 New Year Honours.

Trade union offices
Preceded by George Bagnall	General Secretary of the National Union of Dyers, Bleachers and Textile Workers; 1948 – 1957	Succeeded by Leonard Sharp
Preceded by George Bagnall	Textiles Group representative on the General Council of the Trades Union Congress; 1948 – 1957	Succeeded by Leonard Sharp
