= Leonard Sharp (trade unionist) =

Leonard Sharp MBE (30 January 1902 – 27 June 1972) was a British trade unionist.

== Early life ==
Born in Wakefield, then in the West Riding of Yorkshire, Sharp undertook a number of jobs, and was a keen trade unionist, joining first the National Union of Railwaymen, then the National Union of General Workers. In 1920, he began working in the textile industry, and joined the Amalgamated Society of Dyers, Finishers and Kindred Trades.

== Career ==
The Amalgamated Society became part of the National Union of Dyers, Bleachers and Textile Workers (NUDBTW) in 1936, and Sharp gradually rose to prominence, initially through his activities on local trades councils, serving as president of both the Wakefield and Huddersfield councils. In 1955, he was elected as assistant general secretary of the NUDBTW then, two years later, as general secretary. Also in 1957, he was elected to the General Council of the Trades Union Congress and, through this, became involved with the International Labour Organization, serving as the adviser to the British Workers' Delegate.

== Retirement ==
Sharp retired in 1966, and was made a Member of the Order of the British Empire.

Trade union offices
Preceded by Wilfred Heywood	General Secretary of the National Union of Dyers, Bleachers and Textile Workers; 1957 – 1966	Succeeded by Jack Peel
Preceded by Wilfred Heywood	Textiles Group representative on the General Council of the Trades Union Congress; 1957 – 1966	Succeeded by Jack Peel
