= Operative Bleachers, Dyers and Finishers Association =

Former trade union of the United Kingdom

Bolton Amalgamation
- Operative Bleachers, Dyers and Finishers Association
- Merged into: National Union of Dyers, Bleachers and Textile Workers
- Founded: 1866
- Dissolved: 1936
- Headquarters: 19 Wood Street, Bolton
- Location: England
- Members: 11,000 (1910)
- Key people: Gilbert W. Jones (Gen Sec)
- Affiliations: TUC, Labour

The Operative Bleachers, Dyers and Finishers Association, also known as the Bolton Amalgamation, was a trade union representing cotton finishers in the vicinity of Bolton.

== History ==
The union was founded in 1866 in Bolton and by 1871 already had more than 1,000 members. In its early years, it focused on paying welfare benefits to members and promoting their high skill levels. By 1892, the union was also organising in Bury, Chorley, Great Lever, Middleton and Pendleton, and its membership had grown to 3,583. That year, it launched its first strike; this was followed by further strikes in 1893 and 1895, which ultimately achieved a standard wage structure.

The union continued to grow under the leadership of Alfred Smalley, and appointed Robert Kay as a full-time organiser. It had 4,700 members in 1904, and more than 11,000 in 1910.

In 1936, the union merged with the Amalgamated Society of Dyers, Finishers and Kindred Trades and the National Union of Textile Workers to form the National Union of Dyers, Bleachers and Textile Workers.

== Election results ==
The union sponsored a Labour Party candidate in two Parliamentary elections, on both occasions in seats which the party had never previously won.

Election	Constituency	Candidate	Votes	Percentage	Position
1931 general election	Chorley	John Barrow	12,734	30.7	2
1935 general election	Royton	Leonard Oakes	8,845	22.5	3

== General Secretaries ==
1900s: Alfred Smalley
1915: Gilbert W. Jones
1931: Charles Hewitt
