= Pattern Weavers' Society =

Trade union that represented textile workers in the UK

- Founded: 1930
- Dissolved: c.2000
- Headquarters: New Field End, Cumberworth
- Location: United Kingdom
- Members: 350 (1931)
- Key people: Gordon Hawley (gen. sec.)
- Affiliations: NAUTT, TUC

The Pattern Weavers' Society was a small trade union representing textile workers in the United Kingdom.

During the 1920s, workers employed in weaving patterned material were represented by the National Union of Textile Workers. However, with a trade depression starting at the end of the decade, employers were looking to cut wages, and the pattern weavers believed that they would have a stronger bargaining position if they were represented separately from workers they felt to be lower skilled.

The society was established in 1930, and within a year had 350 members. However, membership gradually declined as the industry contracted, falling to 250 members by 1968, and 100 in 1979. It joined the Trades Union Congress in 1968, but disaffiliated in 1987. It continued in existence, and for the first time accepted a woman as a member. By 1993, its membership was down to 60, and it appears to have dissolved around the year 2000.

== General Secretaries ==
1940s: A. Kelk
1960s: Willie Lockwood
1960s: J. D. Townend
c.1980: Gordon Hawley
1990s: David Mellor
