= Gilbert Wright Jones =

British trade union leader and politician

Gilbert Wright Jones (1870 – 8 January 1933) was a British trade union leader and politician.

Jones joined the Operative Bleachers, Dyers and Finishers Association in about 1890, and was elected as its general secretary in 1915. That year, he was involved in a train crash at Smithy Bridge railway station. He was buried underneath a train carriage, with a colleague, but was later rescued. Another colleague was killed in the accident.

At the 1918 United Kingdom general election, Jones stood for the Labour Party in Rossendale, taking a close second place with 35.1% of the vote. He stood again in 1922, increasing his vote share to 36.5% but still failing to take the seat.

By 1931, Jones was suffering from poor health, and he stood down from his trade union posts. He died early in 1933.

Trade union offices
Preceded by Alfred Smalley	General Secretary of the Operative Bleachers, Dyers and Finishers Association; 1915–1931	Succeeded by Charles Hewitt
