= Joseph Hayhurst =

British politician and trade union leader

Joseph Hayhurst (1864 – 13 June 1919) was a British politician and trade union leader.

Born in Lancaster, Lancashire, Hayhurst worked at the Manningham Mills in Bradford, where he joined the Bradford and District Amalgamated Society of Dyers, Crabbers, Singers and Finishers. He took part in the major strike at the mills in 1890 and 1891, and, inspired by the labour movement, he was a founder member of the Bradford Labour Union.

From 1893, Hayhurst was a delegate to the Bradford Trades Council, and later in the year, he was elected as general secretary of his union, by now renamed as the Amalgamated Society of Dyers. Under his leadership, membership of the union grew from about 3,000 to well over 10,000. He favoured the amalgamation of all the dyers' unions in the country, but little progress to this end was made under his leadership.

Hayhurst stood for Bradford Town Council as a joint trades council-Labour Union candidate, and was the first to win election against both Conservative Party and Liberal Party opponents. He followed the Labour Union into the Independent Labour Party, which in 1900 became a founding affiliate of the Labour Party. Hayhurst became an alderman, and the chair of the Labour Party group on the council. In 1918, he was elected as the first Labour Lord Mayor of Bradford, but he died in office, in June 1919.

Trade union offices
Preceded by Henry Robinson	General Secretary of the Amalgamated Society of Dyers; 1893–1919	Succeeded by William Rushworth
Civic offices
Preceded by Herbert Hustler Tetley	Lord Mayor of Bradford; 1918–1919	Succeeded by Walter Barber
