= Alfred Broughton =

British politician (1902–1979)

Sir Alfred Broughton
- 1950 portrait by Bassano Ltd.

Member of Parliament for Batley and Morley
- In office 18 February 1949 – 2 April 1979
- Preceded by: Hubert Beaumont
- Succeeded by: Kenneth Woolmer

Personal details
- Born: Alfred Davies Devonsher Broughton; 18 October 1902
- Died: 2 April 1979 (aged 76) Batley, England
- Party: Labour
- Children: 2
- Education: Downing College, Cambridge; London Hospital Medical College
- Profession: Doctor

Sir Alfred Davies Devonsher Broughton (18 October 1902 – 2 April 1979) was a British Labour Party politician and doctor who was the MP for Batley and Morley from 1949 until his death.

== Background ==
Alfred Davies Devonsher Broughton was born in 1902. His family had been doctors in Batley for decades. He received his education at Rossall School, Downing College, Cambridge, and the London Hospital. Following in his family's footsteps, he pursued a career as a general practitioner in Batley. During World War II, he worked in civil defence and in the medical branch of the Royal Air Force. He was a member of the Batley Borough Council from 1946 to 1949.

Broughton was married twice and had two children from his first marriage.

== Parliamentary career ==
Broughton served as the Member of Parliament for Batley and Morley from a 1949 by-election. In 1960, he held the position of opposition whip. However, throughout the 1970s, Broughton's health deteriorated due to bronchitis, and he spent much of his time living in hospitals in Yorkshire. The loss of the Labour government's majority meant that his treatment was often disrupted so that he could be transported to London to participate in key votes by being 'nodded through.' Despite considering resignation due to his health, Broughton ultimately decided against it, as some within the party were uncertain if Labour could successfully defend the seat in a by-election.

=== 1979 no confidence vote and death ===
On 28 March 1979, the government faced a knife-edge vote of no confidence when Broughton was on his deathbed at his home in Batley. Broughton's doctors were extremely concerned for him and strongly advised him not to travel. Broughton knew that his death was imminent, but he was still willing to come down to vote with the government. However, Deputy Chief Whip Walter Harrison, with the agreement of Prime Minister James Callaghan, decided it would be unacceptable to ask him to do so, in case he died during the ambulance journey. The government lost by one vote; had Broughton been present, the Government would have survived, assuming Speaker George Thomas would have broken the tie in favour of the status quo per Speaker Denison's rule. Broughton died five days later, aged 76.

== In popular culture ==
On 8 June 2009, an afternoon play called How Are You Feeling, Alf? about Broughton and the 1979 no confidence vote was aired on BBC Radio 4. It was written by James Graham and featured David Ryall as Broughton and Malcolm Tierney as James Callaghan. Three years later, Graham wrote This House, first staged by the National Theatre, which expanded on the political situation in the 1970s, in which Broughton is a key character.

Broughton is also mentioned in the first episode of the second series of Channel 4 conspiracy thriller Utopia, as part of plot to sway the no-confidence vote.

Parliament of the United Kingdom
Preceded by Hubert Beaumont	MP for Batley and Morley; 1949–1979	Succeeded by Kenneth Woolmer
