= 1908 Dewsbury by-election =

UK Parliamentary by-election

- 23 April 1908

| Candidate | Runciman | Carpenter | Turner |
| Party | Liberal | Conservative | Labour |
| Popular vote | 5,594 | 4,078 | 2,446 |
| Percentage | 46.1% | 33.7% | 20.2% |
MP before election
Walter Runciman
Liberal
Subsequent MP
Walter Runciman
Liberal

The 1908 Dewsbury by-election was held on 23 April 1908. The by-election was held due to the incumbent Liberal MP, Walter Runciman being appointed President of the Board of Education. It was retained by Runciman.

== History ==
General election 1906: Dewsbury
| Party | Candidate | Votes | % | ±% |
|---|---|---|---|---|
| Liberal | Walter Runciman | 6,764 | 54.7 | −6.1 |
| Conservative | W. B. Boyd-Carpenter | 2,959 | 24.0 | −15.2 |
| Labour Repr. Cmte. | Ben Turner | 2,629 | 21.3 | New |
| Majority | | 3,805 | 30.7 | +9.1 |
| Turnout | | 12,352 | 88.5 | +13.7 |
| Registered electors | | 13,951 | | |
| Liberal hold | | Swing | +4.6 | |

== Result ==
Runciman

Dewsbury by-election, 1908
| Party | Candidate | Votes | % | ±% |
|---|---|---|---|---|
| Liberal | Walter Runciman | 5,594 | 46.1 | −8.6 |
| Conservative | W. B. Boyd-Carpenter | 4,078 | 33.7 | +9.7 |
| Labour | Ben Turner | 2,446 | 20.2 | −1.1 |
| Majority | | 1,516 | 12.4 | −18.3 |
| Turnout | | 12,118 | 86.2 | −2.3 |
| Registered electors | | 14,056 | | |
| Liberal hold | | Swing | −9.2 | |
