= 1971 Leeds City Council election =

1971 English local government election

The 1971 Leeds municipal elections were held on 14 May 1971, with one third of the councillors up for vote including a double vacancy in Talbot.

Reflecting national patterns, the results were a near mirror-image of the 1968 results, as Labour achieved their highest vote share since 1945, and their greatest number of votes since 1953. It was the Conservatives who sunk to a low-point this time around, setting post-war record lows in both vote percentages and actual votes. However, with the defeat being less severe and the entirety of the council not being elected this time, the Conservatives held on to control with the superior number of aldermen allotted to them the previous year. Overall turnout across the city was 37.8%.

Starting from such a shrunken base following their overwhelming defeat in 1968, Labour gained over half of seats up for election, as well as holding the seats in the four wards they won previously (City, East Hunslet, Holbeck and Middleton). Labour gained seventeen in total, with all but Castleton from the Conservatives: Armley, Beeston, Bramley, Burley, Burmantofts, Castleton, Gipton, Harehills, Kirkstall, Osmondthorpe, Richmond Hill, Scott Hall, Seacroft, Stanningley, Whinmoor, Woodhouse and Wortley. Castleton was gained from the Liberals, who repeated their success in West Hunslet for the third year running and gained from the Conservatives, leaving their total unchanged.

== Election result ==
Leeds local election result 1971
Party	Seats	Gains	Losses	Net gain/loss	Seats %	Votes %	Votes	+/−
Labour	21	17	0	+17	67.7	56.9	76,350	+14.8
Conservative	9	0	17	-17	29.0	36.4	48,893	-10.6
Liberal	1	1	1	0	3.2	6.0	8,016	-3.8
Communist	0	0	0	0	0.0	0.7	965	-0.2

The result had the following consequences for the total number of seats on the Council after the elections:

Party	Previous council		New council	
Party	Cllr	Ald	Cllr	Ald
Conservatives	62	16	45	16
Labour	23	14	40	14
Liberals	5	0	5	0
Total	90	30	90	30
Total	120		120	
Working majority	34	2	0	2
Working majority	36		2	

== Ward results ==
Armley
Party	Candidate	Votes	%	±%
Labour	C. Buttery	3,147	56.2	+23.6
Conservative	B. Stockwell	1,734	31.0	−5.4
Liberal	G. Ashton	678	12.1	−14.8
Communist	P. Wilton	43	0.8	−0.1
Majority		1,413	25.2	+21.4
Turnout		5,602		
Labour gain from Conservative		Swing	+14.5	

Beeston
Party	Candidate	Votes	%	±%
Labour	Harry Booth	3,151	56.7	+17.5
Conservative	J. Farrell	2,161	38.9	−11.9
Liberal	E. Webster	249	4.5	−5.5
Majority		990	17.8	+6.2
Turnout		5,561		
Labour gain from Conservative		Swing	+14.7	

Bramley
Party	Candidate	Votes	%	±%
Labour	Denise Atkinson	4,013	67.1	+16.9
Conservative	J. Hart	1,972	32.9	−10.0
Majority		2,041	34.1	+26.9
Turnout		5,985		
Labour gain from Conservative		Swing	+13.4	

Burley
Party	Candidate	Votes	%	±%
Labour	J. Sully	2,700	61.4	+13.3
Conservative	A. Rimmer	1,615	36.8	−12.9
Communist	T. Flynn	79	1.8	−0.4
Majority		1,085	24.7	+23.2
Turnout		4,394		
Labour gain from Conservative		Swing	+13.1	

Burmantofts
Party	Candidate	Votes	%	±%
Labour	R. Millett	3,579	73.9	+18.0
Conservative	H. Flockton	1,185	24.5	−9.0
Communist	F. Stockdale	78	1.6	+0.8
Majority		2,394	49.4	+27.0
Turnout		4,842		
Labour gain from Conservative		Swing	+13.5	

Castleton
Party	Candidate	Votes	%	±%
Labour	R. Sedler	2,096	48.9	+12.3
Liberal	M. Begard	1,952	45.5	−8.2
Conservative	H. Stockwell	191	4.5	−4.2
Communist	K. Robinson	47	1.1	+0.1
Majority		144	3.4	−13.7
Turnout		4,286		
Labour gain from Liberal		Swing	+10.2	

Chapel Allerton
Party	Candidate	Votes	%	±%
Conservative	P. Sparling	2,527	71.1	−11.2
Labour	B. Selby	685	19.3	+7.7
Liberal	R. Whitelock	341	9.6	+3.5
Majority		1,842	51.8	−19.0
Turnout		3,553		
Conservative hold		Swing	-9.4	

City
Party	Candidate	Votes	%	±%
Labour	W. Merritt	2,226	85.8	+20.0
Conservative	W. Annan	369	14.2	−14.5
Majority		1,857	71.6	+34.6
Turnout		2,595		
Labour hold		Swing	+17.2	

Cookridge
Party	Candidate	Votes	%	±%
Conservative	Keith Loudon	2,465	49.7	−9.8
Labour	G. Bowesley	1,776	35.8	+13.7
Liberal	E. Finkle	719	14.5	−3.9
Majority		689	13.9	−23.5
Turnout		4,960		
Conservative hold		Swing	-11.7	

East Hunslet
Party	Candidate	Votes	%	±%
Labour	L. Haughton	2,555	84.1	+17.5
Conservative	B. Cresswell	288	9.5	−3.6
Liberal	H. Fearnley	194	6.4	−13.9
Majority		2,267	74.6	+28.3
Turnout		3,037		
Labour hold		Swing	+10.5	

Gipton
Party	Candidate	Votes	%	±%
Labour	H. Waterman	3,037	64.4	+13.4
Conservative	W. Buckland	1,527	32.4	−12.7
Liberal	K. Pedder	92	2.0	−0.7
Communist	J. Bellamy	61	1.3	+0.0
Majority		1,510	32.0	+26.0
Turnout		4,717		
Labour gain from Conservative		Swing	+13.0	

Halton
Party	Candidate	Votes	%	±%
Conservative	S. Tomlinson	3,185	65.9	−10.6
Labour	J. Moran	1,651	34.1	+11.7
Majority		1,534	31.7	−22.3
Turnout		4,836		
Conservative hold		Swing	-11.1	

Harehills
Party	Candidate	Votes	%	±%
Labour	G. Wood	1,603	48.0	+18.2
Conservative	J. Moran	1,583	47.4	−17.5
Liberal	D. Thorpe	156	4.7	−0.6
Majority		20	0.6	−34.5
Turnout		3,342		
Labour gain from Conservative		Swing	+17.8	

Headingley
Party	Candidate	Votes	%	±%
Conservative	P. Goodwin	2,397	59.4	−12.0
Labour	J. Chartres	1,641	40.6	+12.0
Majority		756	18.8	−24.0
Turnout		4,038		
Conservative hold		Swing	-12.0	

Holbeck
Party	Candidate	Votes	%	±%
Labour	A. Beevers	2,637	83.1	+23.0
Conservative	N. Skin	366	11.5	−1.1
Liberal	R. Newby	172	5.4	−22.0
Majority		2,271	71.5	+38.9
Turnout		3,175		
Labour hold		Swing	+12.0	

Kirkstall
Party	Candidate	Votes	%	±%
Labour	W. Stafford	4,052	60.2	+16.8
Conservative	T. Beevers	2,594	38.5	−11.7
Communist	J. Sidebottom	87	1.3	−0.5
Majority		1,458	21.7	+14.9
Turnout		6,733		
Labour gain from Conservative		Swing	+14.2	

Middleton
Party	Candidate	Votes	%	±%
Labour	J. Taylor	3,521	83.9	+20.7
Conservative	P. Johnson	372	8.9	−5.2
Liberal	L. Ellis	181	4.3	−15.9
Communist	D. Prescott	122	2.9	+0.5
Majority		3,149	75.0	+32.0
Turnout		4,196		
Labour hold		Swing	+12.9	

Moortown
Party	Candidate	Votes	%	±%
Conservative	R. Challenor	2,323	52.1	−16.5
Labour	A. Baum	1,687	37.9	+14.6
Liberal	S. Waldenburg	446	10.0	+1.9
Majority		636	14.3	−31.1
Turnout		4,456		
Conservative hold		Swing	-15.5	

Osmondthorpe
Party	Candidate	Votes	%	±%
Labour	D. Hamilton	3,660	75.3	+13.7
Conservative	Doreen Wood	1,201	24.7	−12.4
Majority		2,459	50.6	+26.1
Turnout		4,861		
Labour gain from Conservative		Swing	+13.0	

Richmond Hill
Party	Candidate	Votes	%	±%
Labour	V. Whelan	3,151	78.1	+20.8
Conservative	S. Gill	818	20.3	−18.4
Communist	P. Fawcett	65	1.6	+0.2
Majority		2,333	57.8	+39.1
Turnout		4,034		
Labour gain from Conservative		Swing	+19.6	

Roundhay
Party	Candidate	Votes	%	±%
Conservative	G. Lax	2,885	78.3	−7.0
Labour	C. Green	800	21.7	+7.0
Majority		2,085	56.6	−14.1
Turnout		3,685		
Conservative hold		Swing	-7.0	

Scott Hall
Party	Candidate	Votes	%	±%
Labour	G. Bloom	2,586	67.9	+19.1
Conservative	E. Lindins	1,153	30.3	−16.6
Communist	M. Tomplak	69	1.8	−2.5
Majority		1,433	37.6	+35.7
Turnout		3,808		
Labour gain from Conservative		Swing	+17.8	

Seacroft
Party	Candidate	Votes	%	±%
Labour	George Mudie	5,115	78.6	+9.3
Conservative	D. Ball	1,328	20.4	−9.5
Communist	A. Dale	67	1.0	+0.2
Majority		3,787	58.2	+18.9
Turnout		6,510		
Labour gain from Conservative		Swing	+9.4	

Stanningley
Party	Candidate	Votes	%	±%
Labour	Christina Myers	3,366	69.1	+14.7
Conservative	K. Knapton	1,431	29.4	−7.4
Communist	F. Sidebottom	77	1.6	+0.7
Majority		1,935	39.7	+22.2
Turnout		4,874		
Labour gain from Conservative		Swing	+11.0	

Talbot
Party	Candidate	Votes	%	±%
Conservative	J. Sherwin	2,692	70.5	−11.0
Conservative	Ronnie Feldman	2,645		
Labour	A. Barnard	902	23.6	+5.1
Labour	J. Morgan	897		
Liberal	C. Thompson	225	5.9	+5.9
Liberal	G. Braham	209		
Majority		1,743	46.9	−16.1
Turnout		3,819		
Conservative hold		Swing		
Conservative hold		Swing	-8.0	

Weetwood
Party	Candidate	Votes	%	±%
Conservative	R. Hall	3,607	81.4	+3.5
Labour	J. Underwood	825	18.6	+8.9
Majority		2,782	62.8	−3.9
Turnout		4,432		
Conservative hold		Swing	-2.7	

West Hunslet
Party	Candidate	Votes	%	±%
Liberal	David Austick	2,201	52.1	+10.7
Labour	J. Hodkinson	1,492	35.3	+4.6
Conservative	D. Nicholls	533	12.6	−15.3
Majority		709	16.8	+6.1
Turnout		4,226		
Liberal gain from Conservative		Swing	+3.0	

Whinmoor
Party	Candidate	Votes	%	±%
Labour	L. Jackson	3,181	75.8	+16.5
Conservative	C. Clark	970	23.1	−15.5
Communist	H. Besser	46	1.1	−1.0
Majority		2,211	52.7	+32.0
Turnout		4,197		
Labour gain from Conservative		Swing	+16.0	

Woodhouse
Party	Candidate	Votes	%	±%
Labour	I. Levy	2,171	57.7	+13.4
Conservative	May Sexton	1,465	39.0	−13.4
Communist	L. Morris	124	3.3	−0.1
Majority		706	18.8	+10.7
Turnout		3,760		
Labour gain from Conservative		Swing	+13.4	

Wortley
Party	Candidate	Votes	%	±%
Labour	W. Thurlow	3,344	58.6	+12.1
Conservative	J. Kirwan	1,956	34.3	−10.2
Liberal	R. Buxton	410	7.2	−1.9
Majority		1,388	24.3	+22.4
Turnout		5,710		
Labour gain from Conservative		Swing	+11.1	
