= 1949 Batley and Morley by-election =

UK parliamentary by-election

The 1949 by-election for the constituency of Batley and Morley in the United Kingdom House of Commons was held on 17 February 1949, caused by the death of the incumbent Labour MP Hubert Beaumont. The result was a hold for the Labour Party, with their candidate Alfred Broughton.

== Result ==
Batley and Morley by-election 1949
Party	Candidate	Votes	%	±%
Labour	Alfred Broughton	24,514	59.3	+1.2
Conservative	A M Ramsden	16,828	40.7	+12.3
Majority		7,686	18.6	−11.1
Turnout		41,342		
Labour hold		Swing		

== Previous election ==
General election 1945: Batley and Morley
Party	Candidate	Votes	%	±%
Labour	Hubert Beaumont	22,682	58.1	+2.7
Conservative	G W Hirst	11,090	28.4	−16.2
Liberal	A Mitchell	5,256	13.5	New
Majority		11,592	29.7	+18.9
Turnout		39,028	80.9	+8.3
Labour hold		Swing		
