= Amalgamated Society of Dyers, Finishers and Kindred Trades =

Former trade union of the United Kingdom

Amalgamated Society of Dyers
- Amalgamated Society of Dyers, Finishers and Kindred Trades
- Merged into: National Union of Dyers, Bleachers and Textile Workers
- Founded: 1878
- Dissolved: 1936
- Headquarters: 90 Sunbridge Road, Bradford
- Location: United Kingdom
- Members: 10,000 (1910)
- Affiliations: TUC, Labour

The Amalgamated Society of Dyers, Finishers and Kindred Trades was a trade union representing dyers and workers in related jobs in the United Kingdom.

== History ==
The union was founded in 1878 as the Bradford and District Amalgamated Society of Dyers, Crabbers, Singers and Finishers. Initially extremely small, with only 77 members at the end of the 1870s, it won a strike in 1880, and it thereafter recruited rapidly, membership reaching 700 by 1884 and 1,801 in 1891.

From 1890 to 1891, the union led a strike at Manningham Mills. This lasted six months and became nationally prominent. Although it ended in defeat, almost all local dyers joining the union, which by 1894 was over 4,000. In 1892, it was renamed as the Amalgamated Society of Dyers, adding "Bleachers and Kindred Trades" in about 1900. It began recruiting nationally, and from 1909 also admitted women, taking membership over 10,000 by 1910.

Several local unions merged into the Amalgamated Society: the Glasgow Calendermens Protective and Funeral Association in 1912, the Nottingham Dyers Association in 1922, the Amalgamated Society of Stuff and Woollen Warehousemen in 1926 and the Radcliffe and District Dyers, Bleachers and Sizers Association in 1927. In the 1920s, it added "Finishers" to its name before, in 1936, merging with the National Union of Textile Workers and the Operative Bleachers, Dyers and Finishers Association to form the National Union of Dyers, Bleachers and Textile Workers.

== Election results ==
The union sponsored Willie Brooke as a Labour Party candidate at each general election from 1929 to 1935, twice winning a seat.

Election	Constituency	Candidate	Votes	Percentage	Position
1929 general election	Dunbartonshire	Willie Brooke	18,153	45.7	1
1931 general election	Dunbartonshire	Willie Brooke	16,474	36.4	2
1935 general election	Batley and Morley	Willie Brooke	21,182	53.6	1

== General Secretaries ==
1885: William Otty
1888: Henry Robinson
1893: Joseph Hayhurst
1919: William Rushworth
1929: Edward Verity
1933: George Bagnall
