= Jack Peel =

British trade union leader

Jack Armitage Peel (8 January 1921 – 10 May 1993) was a British trade union leader and industrial relations adviser.

Peel began working on the railways in 1936, leaving at the end of 1947 to study at Ruskin College. After completing his studies, he found work as a full-time officer with the National Union of Dyers, Bleachers and Textile Workers, winning promotion to the post of Assistant General Secretary in 1957 and then being elected as General Secretary in 1966. Alongside this, he won a seat on the General Council of the Trades Union Congress (TUC).

As general secretary, Peel was a controversial figure, and lost his TUC General Council seat in 1972. The following year, he stood down from his trade union posts to become the Director of Industrial Relations at the European Economic Community's Social Affairs Directorate. In this role, he was openly critical of British trade unions, leading Bill Maddocks, a later secretary of the Dyers, to describe him as a "Judas". In 1979, Peel became Chief Adviser to the Social Affairs Directorate, retiring in 1981. However, in 1983/1984, he spent a year as a senior special adviser to the Secretary of State for Transport on long-term industrial relations strategy. Following this, he was appointed as a senior visiting fellow in industrial relations at the University of Bradford, and in the late 1980s and early 1990s wrote several books on Europe and industrial relations.

Trade union offices
Preceded by Leonard Sharp	General Secretary of the National Union of Dyers, Bleachers and Textile Workers; 1966 – 1973	Succeeded by Fred Dyson
Preceded by Leonard Sharp	Textiles Group representative on the General Council of the Trades Union Congress; 1966 – 1972	Succeeded by Joe King
