= Walter Forrest =

British politician and businessman (1869-1939)

Sir Walter Forrest

Member of Parliament for Pontefract
- In office 6 September 1919 – 26 October 1922
- Preceded by: Sir Joseph Compton-Rickett
- Succeeded by: Tom Smith

Member of Parliament for Batley and Morley
- In office 29 October 1924 – 10 May 1929
- Preceded by: Ben Turner
- Succeeded by: Sir Ben Turner

Personal details
- Born: July 1869
- Died: 18 July 1939 (aged 69)
- Party: Liberal
- Other political affiliations: Liberal National

Sir Walter Forrest (July 1869 – 18 July 1939) was a British Liberal, later Liberal National politician and businessman.

== Birth and family ==
Walter Forrest was the son of Sir William Croft Forrest, a textile manufacturer of Aldringham, Roundhay, a district of Leeds. His father was a member of Pudsey Corporation and seven times Mayor of Pudsey.

Walter Forrest married first Kate Shillings of Pudsey. She died in 1913. They had one son. He remarried in 1915, his second wife being Mary Macduff from Sheffield. Forrest was a partner in his father's woollen manufacturing business. He later developed business interests in a number of companies, including investment trusts and insurance as well as heavy industry.

== Local politics ==
Forrest started his political career in local government. President of Pudsey Liberal Association in the 1890s, Forrest was a member of Pudsey Town Council in Yorkshire between 1900 and 1919, serving as Mayor from 1909 to 1912 and was later an Alderman. Between 1905 and 1919 he was a member of the West Riding County Council for Pudsey and Farsley. He also served as a Justice of the Peace.

== Parliamentary career ==
Forrest entered Parliament at a by-election as a Coalition Liberal – that is a member of the Liberal Party supporting the Coalition with the Conservatives led by David Lloyd George – for the Pontefract division of Yorkshire in September 1919. He held the seat until the 1922 general election when he was defeated by Tom Smith the Labour candidate. He tried unsuccessfully to re-enter Parliament at the 1923 general election as Liberal candidate for Batley but he won that constituency at the 1924 general election. He lost the seat in 1929, again to Labour. In 1922 Forrest had briefly been Parliamentary private secretary to the Postmaster-General.

== Leaving the Liberals ==
In 1931 Forrest joined the Conservative Party, citing his loss of faith in the policy of Free Trade in a letter he sent to Stanley Baldwin but he later switched to the Tories’ Liberal National allies. At the time of his death, just short of his 70th birthday, he was treasurer of the London Liberal National Party and a member of the National Executive of the Liberal National Council. He was knighted for political and public service in the 1935 New Year Honours, becoming a Knight Bachelor.

== Yorkshire heritage ==
Forrest was always proud of his Yorkshire birth and heritage. He was of the Society of Yorkshiremen in London and also chaired the Yorkshire Society. In 1928, after the death of H H Asquith a memorial to the former Liberal prime minister in the form of a bronze bust and panel was unveiled in the Town Hall in Morley, where he had been born. The ceremony was attended by some members of Asquith's family and Forrest, as the local Liberal MP, placed a wreath on the memorial. He is buried in Pudsey cemetery along with his father and his second wife, Mary.

Parliament of the United Kingdom
Preceded by Sir Joseph Compton-Rickett	Member of Parliament for Pontefract; 1919–1922	Succeeded by Tom Smith
Preceded by Ben Turner	Member of Parliament for Batley and Morley; 1924–1929	Succeeded by Sir Ben Turner
