= National Society of Dyers and Finishers =

Former trade union of the United Kingdom

- Merged into: National Union of Textile Workers
- Founded: 1851
- Dissolved: 1922
- Headquarters: 10 Worthington Street, Bradford
- Location: United Kingdom
- Members: 64,000 (1918)
- Key people: Arthur Shaw (Gen Sec)
- Affiliations: TUC

The National Society of Dyers and Finishers was a trade union representing textile dyers and related workers in the United Kingdom, principally in northern England.

== History ==
The union was founded in 1851 as the Huddersfield Operative Dyers' Association and Relief Society. A small, local union, by 1880 it had only about 150 members. However, it then decided to expand its remit, admitting workers in related jobs, such as finishers, millers and scourers, and admit workers in other areas of Yorkshire and Lancashire. In recognition of this, it renamed itself as the Huddersfield, Bradford, Barnsley and District Dyers, Finishers, Millers, Scourers and Kindred Trades Association. The small Lancashire Cotton Skein Dyers Association merged with it in 1890, and by 1901, its membership had grown to 1,270.

In 1902, the union decided to begin admitting women, although they were only ever a small minority of members. It renamed itself as the "National Society of Dyers and Finishers" in 1908, membership having reached nearly 4,000. It became the National Union of Dyers, Finishers and Textile Workers in 1918 and four years later merged with the General Union of Textile Workers and the Yeadon, Guiseley and District Factory Workers' Union, forming the National Union of Textile Workers. Arthur Shaw, general secretary of the Dyers and Finishers, became secretary of the new union.

== General Secretaries ==
J. Williams
1903: Alfred Heaton
1910: Arthur Shaw
