= Bill Maddocks =

English trade union leader (1921–1992)

William Henry Maddocks (18 February 1921 – 23 July 1992) was a British trade union leader.

Maddocks grew up in Keighley, then in the West Riding of Yorkshire. He joined the National Union of Dyers, Bleachers and Textile Workers (NUDBTW), and became its full-time organiser for the West of England in 1963. He was made a Member of the Order of the British Empire in 1975.

In 1978, Maddocks was elected to the General Council of the Trades Union Congress and, the following year, he was elected as General Secretary of the NUDBTW. He was a more left-wing figure than the union's previous leaders, and described one of his predecessors, Jack Peel, as a "Judas" for his criticisms of British trade unions while Director of Industrial Relations at the European Economic Community's Social Affairs Directorate.

Maddocks organised a merger of the NUDBTW into the Transport and General Workers' Union (TGWU), which was completed in 1982. Although he was expected to take up a post as a National Secretary of the TGWU, his health was poor, and he decided instead to retire. He also stood as Labour and Cooperative Party Candidate for Stroud twice. He was District Councillor for Leonard Stanley on Stroud District Council and before that Stroud Rural District Council.

Trade union offices
Preceded by Fred Dyson	General Secretary of the National Union of Dyers, Bleachers and Textile Workers; 1979 – 1982	Succeeded by Position abolished
Preceded by Fred Dyson	Textiles Group representative on the General Council of the Trades Union Congress; 1978 – 1982	Succeeded by Eddie Haigh
