= Larry Smith (trade unionist) =

British trade union leader (1923–2005)

Lawrence Joseph Smith OBE (25 June 1923 – 29 July 2005) was a British trade union leader.

Smith served in the British Army during World War II. Demobbed in 1947, he began working for London Transport, and also joined the Transport and General Workers Union (TGWU). He became a full-time district officer for the union in 1961, London District Secretary in 1965, and then the National Bus Officer in 1966. In 1968, he was one of ten candidates for the post of General Secretary, but was not elected.

Smith's rise in the union continued in 1971, when he became National Secretary of its Passenger Services Group. In 1977, he again stood for the general secretaryship, placing fourth, behind Moss Evans, John Cousins and Alex Kitson. Two years later, he became the union's Executive Officer, and he was also elected to serve on the General Council of the Trades Union Congress, and from 1983 he served on the London Transport Board.

Smith planned to stand for the general secretaryship a third time in 1984, but ultimately endorsed Ron Todd, a fellow left-winger. He was rewarded the following year with the post of Assistant General Secretary, which he held until his retirement in 1988.

Trade union offices
Preceded by Post vacant	Assistant General Secretary of the Transport and General Workers' Union; 1985–1988; With: Eddie Haigh	Succeeded by Eddie Haigh
