= Colin Sharman, Baron Sharman =

British businessman and baron (born 1943)

The Right Honourable The Lord Sharman OBE

Member of the House of Lords
- Lord Temporal
- Life peerage 2 August 1999 – 30 April 2015

Personal details
- Born: Colin Morven Sharman; 19 February 1943 (age 83)
- Party: Liberal Democrat
- Spouse: Angela Timmins
- Children: 2
- Education: Bishop Wordsworth's School

Colin Morven Sharman, Baron Sharman OBE (born 19 February 1943), is the former British chairman of Aviva Group and former chairman of KPMG International.

He was educated at Bishop Wordsworth's School in Salisbury and qualified as a chartered accountant in 1965. He joined Peat Marwick Mitchell the following year, and rose through the years to become chairman of the renamed KPMG in 1997.

Sharman was appointed an Officer of the Order of the British Empire (OBE) in the 1980 Birthday Honours, for services to the British community in the Netherlands.

He married his partner Angela Timmins and had two children, Sarah and Richard. Sarah had three children with her husband Peter Berridge named, Emily, Charlie and Oscar. Richard had two children with his wife Holly Curtis named, William and Florence

On 2 August 1999 he was created a Life Peer as Baron Sharman, of Redlynch in the County of Wiltshire and entered the House of Lords as a Liberal Democrat peer. He retired from the House of Lords on 30 April 2015.

Lord Sharman was a member of the ABN AMRO Supervisory Board from 2003 until 2007. He was chairman of Aviva Group from January 2006 to June 2012, was a non-executive director at Reed Elsevier until April 2011, and on the board of BG Group and Group 4 Securicor. Other previous board appointments include chairman of Aegis Group plc; deputy chairman of G4S plc; Young & Co's Brewery plc and AEA Technology plc. He attended the 2014 Moroccan British Business Conference, held in London, alongside Lord Mayor of London Fiona Woolf.

== Arms ==
Coat of arms of Colin Sharman, Baron Sharman
Crest A demi-ram Argent armed and holding between the forelegs a pair of shears bendwise the points upwards Or. Escutcheon Chequy each chequer per bend Azure and Argent on a pallet between two pallets Gules and charged with a besom the head upwards a besom the head downwards Or. Supporters On either side a pheasant Gules beaked and legged Or.

Orders of precedence in the United Kingdom
Preceded by The Lord Filkin	Gentlemen; Baron Sharman	Followed by The Lord Woolmer of Leeds
