= Hubert Beaumont (Labour politician) =

British politician (1883–1948)

Captain Hubert Beaumont
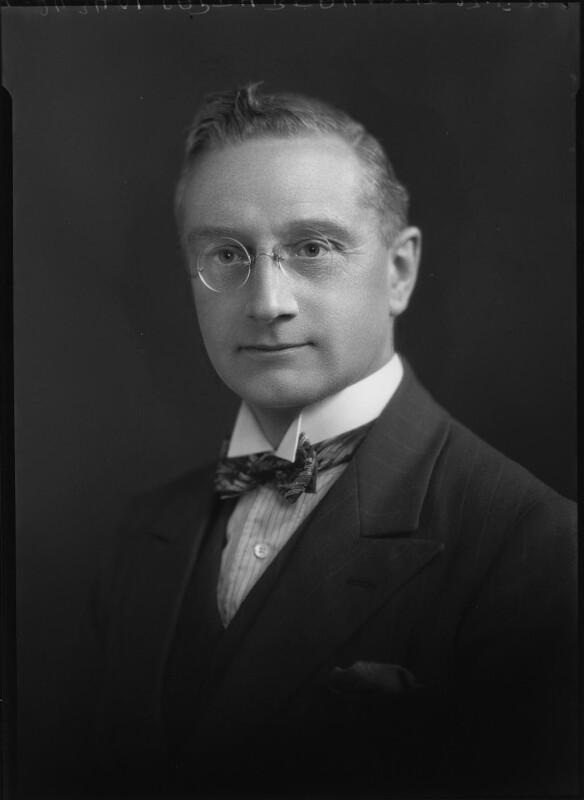
- Beaumont in 1929

Deputy Chairman of Ways and Means
- In office 16 August 1945 – 26 October 1948
- Speaker: Douglas Clifton Brown
- Preceded by: Charles MacAndrew
- Succeeded by: Frank Bowles

Member of Parliament for Batley and Morley
- In office 9 March 1939 – 2 December 1948
- Preceded by: Willie Brooke
- Succeeded by: Alfred Broughton

Personal details
- Born: 1883 Birmingham, UK
- Died: 2 December 1948 (aged 64–65) Manor House Hospital, Golders Green, London, UK
- Party: Labour
- Education: Ruskin College, Oxford

Military service
- Branch/service: British Army
- Rank: Captain
- Battles/wars: First World War

Captain Hubert Beaumont (1883 – 2 December 1948) was a Co-operative official and politician who became a Labour Party Member of Parliament (MP) and served as Deputy Speaker of the House of Commons.

== Early life and career ==
Beaumont was born in Birmingham and went to Saltley College School. He began work for the Co-op, and through their sponsorship he went to Ruskin College, Oxford, and the Central Labour College. During the First World War he became a captain in the Army. He later worked for the League of Nations Union and produced two educational films for them.

== Political career ==
From 1914 to 1925, Beaumont was a member of Derbyshire County Council. He began fighting Parliamentary seats at Aldershot in the 1924 general election, and Harrow in the 1929 general election. In the 1931 general election he was chosen for the Labour-held seat of Peckham where the sitting MP John Beckett had split from the Labour Party. With the vote split among three competing "Labour" candidates, however, Beaumont came fourth with only 1,350 votes.

Beaumont was elected to Yiewsley and West Drayton Urban District Council in 1934. In March 1939, he was elected as the Member of Parliament from Batley and Morley in a by-election, succeeding the late Willie Brooke.

=== Parliament ===
Although remaining a backbencher, his knowledge of agriculture gained from working for the Co-op did win for Beaumont an appointment to the Luxmoore Commission on Agricultural Education in 1943. He served Tom Williams (Labour junior Minister for Agriculture in the Coalition government) as his parliamentary private secretary from 1940.

Following re-election in the 1945 general election, Beaumont was appointed as Deputy Chairman of Ways and Means (the second Deputy Speaker).

While presiding over a debate in the House on 21 September 1948 Beaumont was taken seriously ill and he was forced to resign as Deputy Speaker; he died in a London hospital just over two months later.

Parliament of the United Kingdom
| Preceded by Willie Brooke | Member of Parliament for Batley and Morley; 1939–1948 | Succeeded by Alfred Broughton |
