= Fred Dyson (trade unionist) =

British trade unionist

Fred Dyson (28 September 1916 – 24 April 1987) was a British trade unionist.

Dyson grew up in Slaithwaite, then in the West Riding of Yorkshire, becoming a wool spinner in 1934. During World War II, he served with the Royal Air Force Volunteer Reserve, returning to spinning in 1946. He was active in the National Union of Dyers, Bleachers and Textile Workers, becoming a full-time organiser in 1953, then a Work Study Officer and, in 1970, secretary of the Manchester District.

Dyson was elected as Assistant General Secretary of the Dyers in 1972. Later that year, Jack Peel, the union's controversial leader, resigned to work for the European Economic Community, and Dyson won the election to succeed him. In 1975, he also won a seat on the General Council of the Trades Union Congress.

Dyson served on a considerable number of committees, including the Central Arbitration Committee, the council of the British Textile Confederation, the Industrial Injuries Advisory Council and the Garment and Allied Industries Requirements Board. He retired from his union posts in 1979, moving to Berwick-upon-Tweed, but continued to serve on industrial tribunals. In 1981, he was co-opted to the Northumberland County Highways and Transport Committee, on which he served until his death in 1987.

Trade union offices
Preceded by Jack Peel	General Secretary of the National Union of Dyers, Bleachers and Textile Workers; 1973 – 1979	Succeeded by Bill Maddocks
Preceded by Joe King	Textiles Group representative on the General Council of the Trades Union Congress; 1975 – 1978	Succeeded by Bill Maddocks
