= Ashley Mitchell =

Ashley Mitchell (1886 – 12 January 1977), was a Yorkshire cloth manufacturer and Liberal Party politician who advocated Georgism.

== Background ==
He was born in Ossett, Yorkshire in 1886. He was educated at Ossett Grammar and Wakefield Grammar Schools in Yorkshire.

== Professional career ==
He was a Worsted cloth manufacturer. He was Director of Rowland, Mitchell & Co. Limited of Spa Mills. He was a company chairman.

== Political career ==
He held strong Georgist views and was a committed supporter of Free Trade and Land Value Taxation. He was President of the Huddersfield Textile Society from 1924 to 1928. He was Treasurer of the International Union for Land Value Taxation and Free Trade. He was President of the Yorkshire Federation of Liberal Clubs.

He was Liberal candidate for the Scarborough and Whitby division of Yorkshire at the 1923 General Election. He contested Scarborough and Whitby a second time at the 1924 General election. In 1925 he was selected as Liberal candidate for the Penistone division of Yorkshire for the 1929 General Election. In 1929 he gave evidence to the Wool Safeguarding Inquiry in opposition to duties that had been imposed. In 1931 he was approached to stand for the Liberals at the dual-member Dundee division in Scotland for the 1931 General Election; however, the Liberal candidate was to run in tandem with a Conservative and he was not flexible enough over the issue of protective tariffs to accept the offer. He was Liberal candidate for the Halifax division of Yorkshire at the 1935 General Election. He was Liberal candidate for the Batley and Morley division of Yorkshire at the 1945 General Election. He was Liberal candidate for the Keighley division of Yorkshire at the 1955 General Election. He did not stand for parliament again.

His Memoirs of a fallen political warrior were published in 1974. These were drawn upon by other authors such as Mark Blaug in his biography Henry George (1839-1897) and Jules Gehrke Georgism and the Decline of Liberalism in Interwar Britain.
