= Wilfrid Wills =

Member of Parliament for Batley and Morley
- In office 27 October 1931 – 25 October 1935
- Preceded by: Ben Turner
- Succeeded by: Willie Brooke

Personal details
- Born: Wilfrid Dewhurst Wills; 15 October 1898 Bromley, England
- Died: 20 April 1954 (aged 55)
- Party: Conservative
- Education: Cheltenham College; Royal Military College, Sandhurst

Wilfrid Dewhurst Wills (15 October 1898 – 20 April 1954) was a Conservative Member of Parliament (MP) for Batley and Morley from 1931 to 1935.

The son of a Director of Wills Tobacco, he was born at Bromley, Kent and educated at Cheltenham College and the Royal Military College, Sandhurst. He served in both World Wars: as an Officer in the 5th Dragoon Guards from 1916 to 1919; and as a Lieutenant-Commander in the Royal Naval Volunteer (Wireless) Reserve from 1939 to 1945.

Parliament of the United Kingdom
Preceded by Ben Turner	Member of Parliament for Batley and Morley; 1931–1935	Succeeded by Willie Brooke
