= George Mudie (politician) =

British politician (born 1945)

Deputy Government Chief Whip in the House of Commons Treasurer of the Household
- In office 2 May 1997 – 27 July 1998
- Prime Minister: Tony Blair
- Preceded by: Andrew MacKay
- Succeeded by: Keith Bradley

Member of Parliament for Leeds East
- In office 9 April 1992 – 30 March 2015
- Preceded by: Denis Healey
- Succeeded by: Richard Burgon

Leader of Leeds City Council
- In office 1980–1989
- Preceded by: Peter Sparling
- Succeeded by: Jon Trickett

Leeds City Councillor for Seacroft Ward
- In office 14 May 1971 – 7 May 1992
- Preceded by: D. Ball
- Succeeded by: Graham Hyde

Personal details
- Born: George Edward Mudie; 6 February 1945 (age 81) Dundee, Angus, Scotland
- Party: Labour
- Children: 3

George Edward Mudie (born 6 February 1945) is a Labour Party politician in the United Kingdom who was the Member of Parliament (MP) for Leeds East from 1992 to 2015.

== Early life ==
Born in Dundee, Scotland's fourth-largest city, Mudie was educated at the Waid Academy in Anstruther and later studied Social Studies at Newbattle Abbey College in Dalkeith. He worked initially as an engineer and then joined the merchant navy. In 1968 he became a trade union official with the National Union of Public Employees, a position he held until his election to the House of Commons in 1992.

== Parliamentary career ==
Mudie was elected as a Leeds City Councillor in 1971 at the age of 26 and became the Council Leader from 1980 to 1989, elected as the authority's youngest leader to date at the age of 35 following the 1980 council election.

He was then elected as the Labour MP for Leeds East at the 1992 General Election following the retirement of the former Chancellor of the Exchequer, Denis Healey. He held the seat comfortably until his retirement in 2015.

In Parliament he was appointed as an Opposition Whip in 1994, a position he held until the Labour landslide at the 1997 election when he was elevated to become the Treasurer of HM Household and Deputy Chief Whip. In 1998 he was appointed as a Parliamentary Under-Secretary of State at the Department for Education and Employment. He returned to the back benches in 1999.

He served on a number of select committees, and was a member of the Treasury Select Committee from 2001 to 2014.

In February 2013, Mudie voted against the second reading of the Marriage (Same Sex Couples) Act 2013. Subsequently, in May 2013 the MP voted against the bill’s third and final reading, opposing the legalisation of same-sex marriage within England and Wales.

== Personal life ==
He is married with three children, one from a former marriage. He named his eldest son Keir after Keir Hardie. His wife is a retired primary school headmistress.

Parliament of the United Kingdom
Preceded by Denis Healey	Member of Parliament for Leeds East; 1992–2015	Succeeded by Richard Burgon
Political offices
Preceded by Andrew MacKay	Treasurer of the Household; 1997–1998	Succeeded by Keith Bradley
Party political offices
Preceded by Nick Brown	Labour Deputy Chief Whip in the House of Commons; 1997–1998	Succeeded by Keith Bradley
