= 1954 Leeds City Council election =

English local election

The 1954 Leeds municipal elections were held on Thursday 14 May 1954, with one third of the council up for election.

Despite a further swing away from Labour to the Conservatives of 3.7%, leaving both parties neck and neck in votes, Labour continued on to their third and final gains unabated in the wards of Armley, Blenheim, Bramley, Cross Gates, Stanningley, Westfield, and Woodhouse, comfortably winning the majority of seats. The swing however helped the Conservatives to hold on to Wortley, unlike previous years. As such Labour doubled its majority on the council as part of a victorious night on the whole for them. Turnout for the election sunk below the 40% mark for the first time in the post-war period, to 39.2%.

== Election result ==
Leeds local election result 1954
Party	Seats	Gains	Losses	Net gain/loss	Seats %	Votes %	Votes	+/−
Labour	18	6	0	+6	64.3	49.9	69,429	-2.6
Conservative	10	0	6	-6	35.7	49.4	68,801	+2.7
Communist	0	0	0	0	0.0	0.4	527	+0.2
Liberal	0	0	0	0	0.0	0.4	495	-0.2

The result had the following consequences for the total number of seats on the council after the elections:

Party	Previous council		New council	
Party	Cllr	Ald	Cllr	Ald
Labour	48	14	54	14
Conservatives	36	14	30	14
Total	84	28	84	28
Total	112		112	
Working majority	12	0	24	0
Working majority	12		24	

== Ward results ==
Allerton
Party	Candidate	Votes	%	±%
Conservative	Edwin Wooler	5,603	86.6	+1.5
Labour	F. Watson	866	13.4	−1.5
Majority		4,737	73.2	+2.9
Turnout		6,469		
Conservative hold		Swing	+1.5	

Armley
Party	Candidate	Votes	%	±%
Labour	S. Lee	3,064	57.4	−3.9
Conservative	E. Glover	2,273	42.6	+3.9
Majority		791	14.8	−7.8
Turnout		5,337		
Labour gain from Conservative		Swing	-3.9	

Beeston
Party	Candidate	Votes	%	±%
Conservative	M. Collins	3,797	53.0	+2.5
Labour	H. Booth	3,369	47.0	−2.5
Majority		428	6.0	+5.1
Turnout		7,166		
Conservative hold		Swing	+2.5	

Blenheim
Party	Candidate	Votes	%	±%
Labour	D. Lake	3,164	57.9	+1.0
Conservative	B. Lyons	2,303	42.1	−1.0
Majority		861	15.7	+2.0
Turnout		5,467		
Labour gain from Conservative		Swing	+1.0	

Bramley
Party	Candidate	Votes	%	±%
Labour	G. Rhodes	3,455	53.4	+0.0
Conservative	T. Bennett	3,011	46.6	−0.0
Majority		444	6.9	+0.0
Turnout		6,466		
Labour gain from Conservative		Swing	+0.0	

Burmantofts
Party	Candidate	Votes	%	±%
Labour	W. Shutt	2,266	66.3	−4.8
Conservative	A. Clark	1,150	33.7	+4.8
Majority		1,116	32.7	−9.5
Turnout		3,416		
Labour hold		Swing	-4.8	

City
Party	Candidate	Votes	%	±%
Labour	W. Stoner	2,023	67.3	−2.0
Conservative	R. Hudson	981	32.7	+2.0
Majority		1,042	34.7	−4.0
Turnout		3,004		
Labour hold		Swing	-2.0	

Cross Gates
Party	Candidate	Votes	%	±%
Labour	L. Jackson	2,688	58.7	−7.5
Conservative	L. Demaine	1,888	41.3	+7.5
Majority		800	17.5	−15.1
Turnout		4,576		
Labour gain from Conservative		Swing	-7.5	

East Hunslet
Party	Candidate	Votes	%	±%
Labour	F. Naylor	3,094	76.9	+1.8
Conservative	G. Hewdy	931	23.1	−1.8
Majority		2,163	53.7	+3.5
Turnout		4,025		
Labour hold		Swing	+1.8	

Far Headingley
Party	Candidate	Votes	%	±%
Conservative	W. Hargrave	3,931	83.9	+1.8
Labour	D. Yalland	756	16.1	−1.8
Majority		3,175	67.7	+3.5
Turnout		4,687		
Conservative hold		Swing	+1.8	

Halton
Party	Candidate	Votes	%	±%
Conservative	J. Brooksbank	4,086	76.2	+3.4
Labour	N. Barrett	1,279	23.8	−3.4
Majority		2,807	52.3	+6.9
Turnout		5,365		
Conservative hold		Swing	+3.4	

Harehills
Party	Candidate	Votes	%	±%
Conservative	N. Kay	2,921	53.5	−0.1
Labour	A. Vickers	2,541	46.5	+0.1
Majority		380	7.0	−0.1
Turnout		5,462		
Conservative hold		Swing	-0.1	

Holbeck
Party	Candidate	Votes	%	±%
Labour	T. Smith	2,930	68.6	+4.3
Conservative	J. Sizer	1,340	31.4	+6.3
Majority		1,590	37.2	−2.0
Turnout		4,270		
Labour hold		Swing	-1.0	

Hunslet Carr
Party	Candidate	Votes	%	±%
Labour	T. Ellison	2,643	88.8	+13.7
Communist	R. Wilkinson	332	11.2	+7.1
Majority		2,311	77.7	+23.3
Turnout		2,975		
Labour hold		Swing	+3.3	

Hyde Park
Party	Candidate	Votes	%	±%
Conservative	Kenneth Davison	3,322	68.4	+5.1
Labour	I. Calvert	1,532	31.6	−5.1
Majority		1,790	36.9	+10.1
Turnout		4,854		
Conservative hold		Swing	+5.1	

Kirkstall
Party	Candidate	Votes	%	±%
Labour	A. Happold	3,543	61.1	−1.7
Conservative	E. Lucas	2,253	38.9	+1.7
Majority		1,290	22.3	−3.4
Turnout		5,796		
Labour hold		Swing	-1.7	

Meanwood
Party	Candidate	Votes	%	±%
Conservative	Alan Pedley	4,270	70.1	+1.1
Labour	J. Hedley	1,817	29.9	−1.1
Majority		2,453	40.3	+2.3
Turnout		6,087		
Conservative hold		Swing	+1.1	

Middleton
Party	Candidate	Votes	%	±%
Labour	Arthur Brown	2,800	81.2	−4.1
Conservative	F. Stubley	648	18.8	+4.1
Majority		2,152	62.4	−8.2
Turnout		3,448		
Labour hold		Swing	-4.1	

Moortown
Party	Candidate	Votes	%	±%
Conservative	S. Bolton	4,580	76.7	+6.4
Labour	J. Slater	1,393	23.3	−6.4
Majority		3,187	53.4	+12.9
Turnout		5,973		
Conservative hold		Swing	+6.4	

Osmondthorpe
Party	Candidate	Votes	%	±%
Labour	D. Gabb	3,409	77.4	−2.1
Conservative	D. Bradley	997	22.6	+2.1
Majority		2,412	54.7	−4.2
Turnout		4,406		
Labour hold		Swing	-2.1	

Potternewton
Party	Candidate	Votes	%	±%
Conservative	J. Bidgood	2,385	64.7	+3.4
Labour	F. Howard	1,301	35.3	−3.4
Majority		1,084	29.4	+6.7
Turnout		3,686		
Conservative hold		Swing	+3.4	

Richmond Hill
Party	Candidate	Votes	%	±%
Labour	W. Fowler	2,215	80.2	+0.2
Conservative	W. Clayton	547	19.8	−0.2
Majority		1,668	60.4	+0.4
Turnout		2,762		
Labour hold		Swing	+0.2	

Roundhay
Party	Candidate	Votes	%	±%
Conservative	G. Monkman	4,619	64.5	−2.1
Labour	R. Pennington	2,541	35.5	+2.1
Majority		2,078	29.0	−4.3
Turnout		7,160		
Conservative hold		Swing	-2.1	

Stanningley
Party	Candidate	Votes	%	±%
Labour	W. Spence	2,939	50.3	−1.4
Conservative	F. Ayres	2,899	49.7	+1.4
Majority		40	0.7	−2.8
Turnout		5,838		
Labour gain from Conservative		Swing	-1.4	

Wellington
Party	Candidate	Votes	%	±%
Labour	A. Farrington	2,942	71.6	−1.1
Conservative	D. Wolstenholme	972	23.7	+5.8
Communist	J. Wheatley	195	4.7	+2.5
Majority		1,970	47.9	−7.0
Turnout		4,109		
Labour hold		Swing	-3.4	

Westfield
Party	Candidate	Votes	%	±%
Labour	H. Wiseman	2,331	50.9	−5.8
Conservative	S. Cowling	1,756	38.3	−5.0
Liberal	H. Burbridge	495	10.8	+10.8
Majority		575	12.5	−0.9
Turnout		4,582		
Labour gain from Conservative		Swing	-0.4	

Woodhouse
Party	Candidate	Votes	%	±%
Labour	R. Ellis	3,528	60.7	+0.9
Conservative	F. Winterburn	2,280	39.3	−0.9
Majority		1,248	21.5	+1.8
Turnout		5,808		
Labour gain from Conservative		Swing	+0.9	

Wortley
Party	Candidate	Votes	%	±%
Conservative	Bertrand Mather	3,058	50.5	+3.3
Labour	E. Morris	3,000	49.5	−3.3
Majority		58	1.0	−4.7
Turnout		6,058		
Conservative hold		Swing	+3.3	
