= Yeadon, Guiseley and District Factory Workers' Union =

Former trade union of the United Kingdom

- Merged into: General Union of Textile Workers
- Founded: 1887
- Dissolved: 1922
- Headquarters: Workers' Institute, Yeadon, West Yorkshire
- Location: England
- Members: 2,500 (1918)
- Key people: Herbert Lockwood (Gen Sec)
- Affiliations: TUC

The Yeadon, Guiseley and District Factory Workers' Union was a trade union representing textile workers in part of the West Riding of Yorkshire, in England.

The union was founded in 1887 as the Yeadon and Guiseley Power Loom Weavers' Association, and was led by Herbert Lockwood, who had been victimised for his earlier trade union activities. By 1890, the union had 772 members. In 1892, it decided to broaden its remit to include other workers in textile factories, becoming the "Yeadon, Guiseley and District Factory Workers' Union", and in 1894 the Yeadon, Guiseley and District Fettlers' Union amalgamated with it. However, this was accompanied by a drop in membership, which fell to only 449 members, and bottomed out at 286 members in 1899.

With the turn of the century, the union's membership began rising again, and by 1906 it had recovered to 489. It led a major strike in 1913, involving 2,500 workers and lasting ten weeks. This was a success, with a new agreement on pay and conditions for all workers signed with the Yeadon and Guiseley Manufacturers' Association, and the increased prestige of the union led to rapid membership growth, with 1,076 members by 1915, and 2,500 in 1918.

The union affiliated to the Trades Union Congress in 1918. In 1922, it merged with the National Society of Dyers and Finishers and the General Union of Weavers and Textile Workers, forming the General Union of Textile Workers. Lockwood had remained secretary of the union throughout its existence, and became the Bradford District Secretary of the new union.
