= Willie Brooke =

British politician (1895–1939)

Member of Parliament
- In office 14 November 1935 – 21 January 1939
- Preceded by: Wilfrid Wills
- Succeeded by: Hubert Beaumont
- Constituency: Batley and Morley
- In office 30 May 1929 – 7 October 1931
- Preceded by: John Thom
- Succeeded by: John Thom
- Constituency: Dunbartonshire

Personal details
- Born: 18 December 1895 Bradford, England
- Died: 21 January 1939
- Party: Labour

Willie Brooke (18 December 1895 – 21 January 1939) was a British Trade Union administrator and Labour Party politician.

Brooke, the son of a woolsorter, was born in Bradford. He went to Carlton Street Secondary School; his first job was as an office boy for the Amalgamated Society of Dyers. His work for the Society qualified him for a scholarship to the London Labour College where he studied politics and economics.

A bachelor, in 1925 Brooke was elected to Bradford City Council as a councillor. He became Chairman of the Governors of his old school, and took a particular interest in 'special schools' for the physically disabled.

At the 1929 general election, Brooke was elected as Member of Parliament (MP) for Dunbartonshire. He lost that seat in 1931, but returned to Parliament in the 1935 general election for Batley and Morley. He suffered poor health from 1938, and stayed at Grassington in North Yorkshire and the Isle of Wight in order to recover, but during the Sudeten Crisis he returned to Westminster.

Parliament of the United Kingdom
Preceded by John Thom	Member of Parliament for Dunbartonshire; 1929–1931	Succeeded by John Thom
Preceded by Wilfrid Wills	Member of Parliament for Batley and Morley; 1935–1939	Succeeded by Hubert Beaumont
