= Ben Turner (politician) =

English trade unionist and politician

Sir Ben Turner CBE
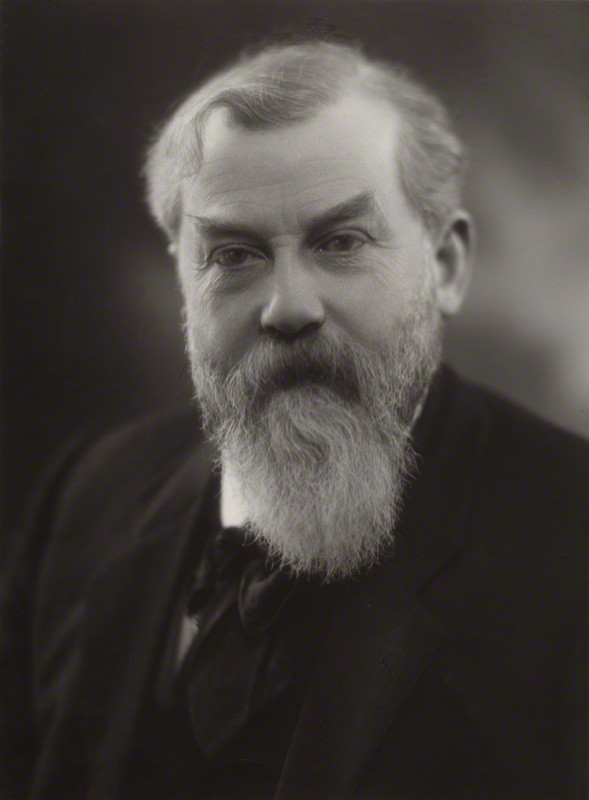
- Turner in 1923

Member of Parliament for Batley and Morley
- In office 30 May 1929 – 7 October 1931
- Preceded by: Walter Forrest
- Succeeded by: Wilfrid Wills
- In office 15 November 1922 – 9 October 1924
- Preceded by: Gerald France
- Succeeded by: Walter Forrest

Personal details
- Born: 1863 Holmfirth, West Yorkshire, England
- Died: 30 September 1942 (aged 78–79)
- Party: Labour
- Other party: Independent Labour

Sir Ben Turner CBE (1863 – 30 September 1942) was an English trade unionist and Labour Party Member of Parliament (MP) for Batley and Morley from 1922 to 1924 and from 1929 to 1931.

== Biography ==
Born in Holmfirth, Turner later claimed that his family had connections to the Chartist and Luddite movements. He became a textile worker, and first joined a trade union in 1883, when he has involved in a strike of weavers in Huddersfield. He worked as a full-time union organiser from 1889.

Turner was Secretary of the Heavy Woollen district branch of the West Riding of Yorkshire Power Loom Weavers' Association from 1892, then General President of the General Union of Textile Workers and its successor, the National Union of Textile Workers, from 1902 to 1933.

A supporter of independent workers' representation, Turner was elected to a local school board in 1892, and was a founder member of the Independent Labour Party in 1893. Also that year, he was elected to Batley Town Council, serving for many years, including a stint as Mayor of Batley from 1913 to 1916.

Turner supported the creation of the Labour Party, serving on its National Executive Committee for eighteen years, and as its chairman, in 1911. He stood for Parliament on numerous occasions, and was finally elected for Batley and Morley at the 1922 general election, losing his seat in 1924, but winning it back in 1929 before losing it a final time in the 1931 election. He served in the Government as Secretary for Mines for a year from 1929.

Turner was also heavily involved in the Trades Union Congress (TUC), acting as its delegate to the American Federation of Labour in 1910, and served as President of the TUC in 1928, the time of the talks with Sir Alfred Mond.

On the occasion of his Golden Wedding in 1934 Turner wrote a volume of poetry entitled "Rhymes, Verses and Poems from a Yorkshire Loom" (Pontefract, W. McGowan, 1934)

Parliament of the United Kingdom
Preceded by Gerald France	Member of Parliament for Batley and Morley; 1922–1924	Succeeded by Walter Forrest
Preceded by Walter Forrest	Member of Parliament for Batley and Morley; 1929–1931	Succeeded by Wilfrid Wills
Party political offices
Preceded by William Pickles	Trades councils representative on the National Executive Committee of the Labour Representation Committee; 1903–1904	Succeeded by J. R. Clynes
Preceded by William Cornforth Robinson	Chair of the Labour Party; 1911–1912	Succeeded by George Henry Roberts
Trade union offices
Preceded by J. R. Clynes and Alfred Henry Gill	Trades Union Congress representative to the American Federation of Labour; 1910; With: William Brace	Succeeded by James Crinion and George Henry Roberts
Preceded by New position	Textiles Group representative on the General Council of the TUC; 1921–1929	Succeeded by Arthur Shaw
Preceded by New position	General President of the National Union of Textile Workers; 1922–1933	Succeeded by Clement Naylor
Preceded by George Hicks	President of the Trades Union Congress; 1928	Succeeded by Ben Tillett
