= National Union of Dyers, Bleachers and Textile Workers =

Former trade union of the United Kingdom

NUDBTW
- National Union of Dyers, Bleachers and Textile Workers
- Merged into: Transport and General Workers Union
- Founded: 1936
- Dissolved: 1982
- Headquarters: National House, Bradford
- Location: United Kingdom
- Members: 85,500 (1939)
- Key people: Jack Peel, Bill Maddocks
- Affiliations: ITGLWF, Labour Party, NAUTT, TUC

The National Union of Dyers, Bleachers and Textile Workers (NUDBTW) was a trade union in the United Kingdom. It amalgamated with the Transport and General Workers' Union in 1982.

== History ==
The union was founded in 1936 with the merger of the National Union of Textile Workers, which was the main union representing workers in the woollen and worsted industries, the Amalgamated Society of Dyers, Finishers and Kindred Trades, and the Operative Bleachers, Dyers and Finishers Association, which represented workers in Lancashire. The NUDBTW represented a membership of 85,500 in 1939, of whom 25,500 were women. Dyeing and finishing were predominantly male trades, and thus had a greater union presence than other sections of the British textile industry. The woollen and worsted industries, by contrast, were poorly organised. Closed shop agreements covered the majority of workers employed in textile finishing.

From 1966 to 1973, the union was led by Jack Peel, a controversial figure who left to work for the European Economic Community and later led many attacks on trade unions in the UK. One successor, Bill Maddocks, described him as a "Judas". Under Maddocks' leadership, the union became more campaigning, particularly in opposing the use of benzidine-based dyes.

By the start of the 1980s, membership had fallen to 56,843 due to widespread job losses in the industry. However, membership was boosted when several other unions joined the NUDBTW: the Union of Jute, Flax and Kindred Textile Operatives in 1979, and the Yorkshire Society of Textile Craftsmen and the Huddersfield and District Healders and Twisters Trade and Friendly Society in 1980. After initially considering amalgamation with the National Union of Tailors and Garment Workers the NUDBTW merged into the Transport and General Workers' Union (TGWU) in 1982, forming a Dyers, Bleachers and Textile Workers Trade Group within the TGWU. Existing members of the TGWU who worked in the textile industry transferred into the new trade group, doubling its size.

== Election results ==
The union sponsored a Labour Party candidate at the 1955 general election.

Election	Constituency	Candidate	Votes	Percentage	Position
1955 general election	Shipley	Ernest Gardner	17,251	43.3	2

== General Secretaries ==
1936: Arthur Shaw
1939: George Bagnall
1948: Wilfred Heywood
1957: Leonard Sharp
1966: Jack Peel
1973: Fred Dyson
1979: Bill Maddocks

== See also ==
- Transport and General Workers' Union
- TGWU amalgamations
