= 1978 Leeds City Council election =

1978 UK local government election

Elections to Leeds City Council were held on 4 May 1978, with one third of the council up for election, as well as an extra vacancy in Wetherby. Prior to the election, the Hunslet East and West incumbent, Dennis Peddar, had defected from the Liberals to Independent, and fought this election as such.

The election seen a returning swing to Labour, although gains and losses were spread fairly equitably, with Labour narrowly gaining from the Conservatives in Wortley and comfortably from the Independent in Hunslet East and West, but losing Burmantofts and Richmond Hill to the Liberals. The Conservative gain from the Liberals in Pudsey South left the two parties' totals unchanged. This resulted in the Conservatives retaining control of the council, with an unaltered majority of four.

== Election result ==
Leeds local election result 1978
Party	Seats	Gains	Losses	Net gain/loss	Seats %	Votes %	Votes	+/−
Conservative	15	1	1	0	45.4	43.8	86,707	-4.3%
Labour	15	2	1	1	45.4	40.5	80,070	+6.6%
Liberal	3	1	1	0	9.1	12.2	24,057	-3.2%
Ecology	0	0	0	0	0.0	1.2	2,422	+1.1%
National Front	0	0	0	0	0.0	1.1	2,185	+0.2%
Independent	0	0	1	-1	0.0	0.7	1,425	+0.6%
Communist	0	0	0	0	0.0	0.5	913	+0.1%

This result has the following consequences for the total number of seats on the council after the elections:

Party	Previous council	New council
Conservatives	50	50
Labour	38	39
Liberals	7	7
Independent	1	0
Total	96	96
Working majority	4	4

== Ward results ==
Aireborough
Party	Candidate	Votes	%	±%
Conservative	W. Hudson	5,202	56.6	+0.2
Labour	M. Dunn	2,429	26.4	−0.4
Liberal	J. Brown	1,556	16.9	+0.1
Majority		2,773	30.2	+0.6
Turnout		9,187		
Conservative hold		Swing	+0.3	

Armley and Castleton
Party	Candidate	Votes	%	±%
Liberal	M. Meadowcroft	3,007	45.0	+4.5
Labour	C. Buttery	2,122	31.8	−1.3
Conservative	C. Mathers	1,339	20.0	−1.6
National Front	M. Spink	87	1.3	+0.5
Ecology	J. Garrett	74	1.1	+1.1
Communist	J. Hodgson	54	0.8	−0.2
Majority		885	13.2	+5.8
Turnout		6,683		
Liberal hold		Swing	+2.9	

Beeston and Holbeck
Party	Candidate	Votes	%	±%
Labour	A. Beevers	4,409	61.7	+11.6
Conservative	E. Lucas	2,574	36.0	−3.3
National Front	E. Thomas	161	2.3	+2.3
Majority		1,835	25.7	+14.8
Turnout		7,144		
Labour hold		Swing	+7.4	

Bramley
Party	Candidate	Votes	%	±%
Labour	E. Atkinson	2,764	53.9	+2.6
Conservative	W. Broadbent	1,339	26.1	−9.2
Liberal	D. Selby	910	17.8	+4.5
National Front	S. Smith	60	1.2	+1.2
Communist	J. Light	52	1.0	+1.0
Majority		1,425	27.8	+11.8
Turnout		5,125		
Labour hold		Swing	+5.9	

Burley
Party	Candidate	Votes	%	±%
Labour	L. Cohen	1,811	54.2	+14.5
Conservative	A. Sexton	1,307	39.1	−12.5
Ecology	K. Baxter	133	4.0	+4.0
Communist	B. Jackson	57	1.7	−0.8
National Front	C. Whitehead	36	1.1	−0.2
Majority		504	15.1	+3.2
Turnout		3,344		
Labour hold		Swing	+13.5	

Burmantofts and Richmond Hill
Party	Candidate	Votes	%	±%
Liberal	M. Clay	3,901	50.5	+16.1
Labour	Michael McGowan	2,729	35.3	−4.0
Conservative	R. Simpson	897	11.6	−7.5
National Front	S. Rigby	119	1.5	−1.1
Communist	M. Monkman	84	1.1	−0.5
Majority		1,172	15.2	+10.2
Turnout		7,730		
Liberal gain from Labour		Swing	+10.0	

Chapel Allerton and Scott Hall
Party	Candidate	Votes	%	±%
Conservative	P. Sparling	4,039	51.6	−11.5
Labour	J. Kerwin-Davey	2,984	38.1	+10.3
Liberal	D. Thorpe	495	6.3	−2.8
National Front	P. Jackson	148	1.9	+1.9
Communist	L. Willoughby	108	1.4	+1.4
Ecology	T. Bernstein	54	0.7	+0.7
Majority		1,055	13.5	−21.8
Turnout		7,828		
Conservative hold		Swing	-10.9	

City and Woodhouse
Party	Candidate	Votes	%	±%
Labour	W. Merritt	2,644	64.3	+12.1
Conservative	C. Hudson	1,093	26.6	−2.7
Liberal	A. Ali	177	4.3	−10.4
Communist	J. Rodgers	130	3.2	−0.7
National Front	A. Rhodes	69	1.7	+1.7
Majority		1,551	37.7	+14.8
Turnout		4,113		
Labour hold		Swing	+7.4	

Cookridge and Weetwood
Party	Candidate	Votes	%	±%
Conservative	Ralph David Hall	6,201	64.5	−8.3
Labour	John Illingworth	2,091	21.7	+3.3
Liberal	David Gazey	1,132	11.8	+2.9
Ecology	P. Lewenz	197	2.0	+2.0
Majority		4,110	42.7	−11.6
Turnout		9,621		
Conservative hold		Swing	-5.8	

Garforth North and Barwick
Party	Candidate	Votes	%	±%
Conservative	B. Rowley	4,487	60.5	−4.0
Labour	H. Martin	2,451	33.0	+1.3
Ecology	D. Corry	483	6.5	+6.5
Majority		2,036	27.5	−5.3
Turnout		7,421		
Conservative hold		Swing	-2.6	

Gipton and Whinmoor
Party	Candidate	Votes	%	±%
Labour	R. Dixon	4,265	62.3	+12.4
Conservative	W. Buckland	2,363	34.5	−11.2
National Front	B. Spink	137	2.0	−2.4
Communist	G. Thompson	82	1.2	+1.2
Majority		1,902	27.8	+23.6
Turnout		6,847		
Labour hold		Swing	+11.8	

Halton
Party	Candidate	Votes	%	±%
Conservative	M. Dodgson	4,034	70.1	−1.2
Labour	D. Brown	1,586	27.6	+1.5
National Front	C. Dewar	134	2.3	−0.3
Majority		2,448	42.5	−2.8
Turnout		5,754		
Conservative hold		Swing	-1.3	

Harehills and Roundhay
Party	Candidate	Votes	%	±%
Conservative	P. Crotty	4,139	54.6	−14.4
Labour	M. Lyons	2,821	37.2	+10.5
Liberal	H. Bevans	396	5.2	+5.2
Ecology	A. Andrew	118	1.6	+1.6
National Front	C. Dewar	105	1.4	−2.9
Majority		1,318	17.4	−24.9
Turnout		7,579		
Conservative hold		Swing	-12.4	

Headingley
Party	Candidate	Votes	%	±%
Conservative	E. Clark	2,240	45.1	−11.3
Labour	E. Whelan	1,645	33.1	+6.9
Liberal	D. Rolfe	692	13.9	+0.7
Communist	B. Cooper	210	4.2	−0.1
Ecology	K. Rushworth	185	3.7	+3.7
Majority		595	12.0	−18.2
Turnout		4,972		
Conservative hold		Swing	-9.1	

Horsforth
Party	Candidate	Votes	%	±%
Liberal	M. Crossfield	3,413	44.1	+11.8
Conservative	B. Pickard	3,201	41.4	−9.0
Labour	T. Watson	864	11.2	−2.6
Ecology	D. Darnborough	262	3.4	+3.4
Majority		212	2.7	−15.3
Turnout		7,740		
Liberal hold		Swing	+10.4	

Hunslet East and West
Party	Candidate	Votes	%	±%
Labour	G. Driver	3,035	49.9	+6.9
Independent	D. Pedder	1,425	23.4	+23.4
Liberal	J. Finnigan	795	13.1	−31.3
Conservative	R. Tetley	670	11.0	+2.4
National Front	N. Griffiths	462	2.7	−0.6
Majority		1,610	26.4	+24.9
Turnout		6,087		
Labour gain from Independent		Swing	-8.2	

Kippax and Swillington
Party	Candidate	Votes	%	±%
Labour	K. Smith	3,219	59.0	+5.4
Conservative	B. King	2,234	41.0	−0.8
Majority		985	18.0	+6.2
Turnout		5,453		
Labour hold		Swing	+3.1	

Kirkstall
Party	Candidate	Votes	%	±%
Labour	Elizabeth Nash	3,373	56.8	+6.0
Conservative	T. Battersby	2,327	39.2	−5.1
Liberal	Laurence Keates	239	4.0	+4.0
Majority		1,046	17.6	+11.1
Turnout		5,939		
Labour hold		Swing	+5.5	

Middleton
Party	Candidate	Votes	%	±%
Labour	J. Taylor	3,156	77.4	+17.6
Conservative	N. Landers	789	19.3	−6.0
Communist	R. Ward	82	2.0	−0.4
National Front	R. Buck	52	1.3	+1.3
Majority		2,367	58.0	+23.6
Turnout		4,079		
Labour hold		Swing	+11.8	

Moortown
Party	Candidate	Votes	%	±%
Conservative	A. Redmond	2,926	62.9	−2.6
Labour	I. Levy	1,567	33.7	+11.5
Ecology	S. Waldenberg	160	3.4	−0.3
Majority		1,359	29.2	−14.1
Turnout		4,653		
Conservative hold		Swing	-7.0	

Morley North
Party	Candidate	Votes	%	±%
Conservative	B. Barker	3,209	50.7	+0.1
Labour	B. North	3,119	49.3	+21.3
Majority		90	1.4	−21.3
Turnout		6,328		
Conservative hold		Swing	-10.6	

Morley South
Party	Candidate	Votes	%	±%
Labour	B. Haydn	3,310	62.3	+12.4
Conservative	C. Rover	1,999	37.7	−12.4
Majority		1,311	24.7	+24.5
Turnout		5,309		
Labour hold		Swing	+12.4	

Osmondthorpe
Party	Candidate	Votes	%	±%
Labour	D. Gabb	2,399	66.7	+11.7
Conservative	D. Zucker	1,087	30.2	−5.1
National Front	L. Fella	113	3.1	−2.1
Majority		1,312	36.5	+16.9
Turnout		3,599		
Labour hold		Swing	+8.4	

Otley and Wharfedale
Party	Candidate	Votes	%	±%
Conservative	F. Atkinson	3,937	50.1	+5.6
Liberal	J. Spencer	2,910	37.0	−7.1
Labour	I. Swain	960	12.2	+1.4
Communist	A. Oddy	54	0.7	+0.0
Majority		1,027	13.1	+12.8
Turnout		7,861		
Conservative hold		Swing	+6.3	

Pudsey North
Party	Candidate	Votes	%	±%
Conservative	A. Carter	3,724	59.2	+13.7
Labour	P. Burrill	1,756	27.9	+4.9
Liberal	S. Hollingworth	812	12.9	−18.5
Majority		1,968	31.3	+17.2
Turnout		6,292		
Conservative hold		Swing	+4.4	

Pudsey South
Party	Candidate	Votes	%	±%
Conservative	L. Fletcher	2,475	43.0	−2.3
Liberal	G. Wilson	2,065	35.9	+5.3
Labour	W. Thurlow	1,211	21.1	−3.0
Majority		410	7.1	−7.6
Turnout		5,751		
Conservative gain from Liberal		Swing	-3.8	

Rothwell
Party	Candidate	Votes	%	±%
Labour	R. Lund	4,939	62.4	+18.3
Conservative	R. Harvey	2,781	35.1	+6.5
National Front	J. Duckenfield	194	2.5	+2.5
Majority		2,158	27.3	+11.8
Turnout		7,914		
Labour hold		Swing		

Seacroft
Party	Candidate	Votes	%	±%
Labour	I. Adams	3,303	70.4	+12.7
Conservative	D. Townsley	1,256	26.8	−10.4
National Front	C. Cannon	135	2.9	−0.4
Majority		2,047	43.6	+23.1
Turnout		4,694		
Labour hold		Swing	+11.5	

Stanningley
Party	Candidate	Votes	%	±%
Labour	A. Miller	2,699	60.2	+8.2
Conservative	I. Benton	1,392	31.1	−4.0
Liberal	F. Upton	316	7.0	−5.9
National Front	M. Gibson	76	1.7	+1.7
Majority		1,307	29.1	+12.2
Turnout		4,483		
Labour hold		Swing	+6.1	

Talbot
Party	Candidate	Votes	%	±%
Conservative	I. Bellow	3,687	69.4	−2.4
Labour	B. Walker	1,061	20.0	+2.7
Liberal	M. Phillips	320	6.0	−4.9
Ecology	S. Parkin	201	3.8	+3.8
National Front	L. Spink	46	0.9	+0.9
Majority		2,626	49.4	−5.0
Turnout		5,315		
Conservative hold		Swing	-4.0	

Wetherby
Party	Candidate	Votes	%	±%
Conservative	D. Hudson	5,419	71.5	−3.2
Conservative	J. Grange	5,311		
Labour	J. Taylor	963	12.7	−1.3
Labour	M. Moynihan	808		
Liberal	J. Scott	641	8.5	−2.8
Ecology	M. Sellers	555	7.3	+7.3
Majority		4,456	58.8	−1.8
Turnout		7,578		
Conservative hold		Swing		
Conservative hold		Swing	-0.9	

Wortley
Party	Candidate	Votes	%	±%
Labour	P. Fathers	2,385	44.5	+3.8
Conservative	F. Stubley	2,340	43.7	−3.5
Liberal	W. Moss	519	9.7	−2.4
National Front	A. Smith	112	2.1	+2.1
Majority		45	0.8	−5.7
Turnout		5,356		
Labour gain from Conservative		Swing	+3.6	
