= National Association of Unions in the Textile Trade =

UK trade union federation

The National Association of Unions in the Textile Trade (NAUTT) was a trade union federation in the United Kingdom.

The federation was founded in 1916. Despite its name, it included unions in only two areas of the textile trade: the wool industry, and textile finishing. Most aspects of the cotton industry were instead covered by the Northern Counties Textile Trades Federation. While it had a large number of members, most were small unions, often local in scope, and the bulk of the membership came from the dyers' union.

By 1979, the federation had been renamed as the "National Association of Unions in Textiles", and its members were:

- Cloth Pressers Society
- Huddersfield Healders and Twisters Trade and Friendly Society
- Managers' and Overlookers' Society
- National Union of Dyers, Bleachers and Textile Workers
- Pattern Weavers' Society
- Scottish Council of Textile Trade Unions

The National Union of Dyers merged into the Transport and General Workers' Union in 1982, and it appears that the federation dissolved around that date.
