= 1970 Leeds City Council election =

1970 English local government election

The 1970 Leeds City Council elections were held on 8 May 1970, with one third of the seats up for election, as well as an extra vacancy in Beeston.

The election seen a nationally resurgent Labour gain 10 seats and achieve a 13% swing from the Conservatives, returning to a competitive status after the routings suffered the previous two elections. Labour gains were as follows: Bramley, Burmantofts, Gipton, Osmondthorpe, Richmond Hill, Scott Hall, Seacroft, Stanningley, Whinmoor and Wortley. There was also a narrow hold in Burley, with Labour close to eliminating the almost 40% Conservative majority managed there the year before. The Liberals further increased their representation with a gain from the Conservatives, repeating their success in West Hunslet following the previous year's upset.

== Election result ==
Leeds local election result 1970
Party	Seats	Gains	Losses	Net gain/loss	Seats %	Votes %	Votes	+/−
Conservative	15	0	11	-11	48.4	47.0	58,281	-11.7
Labour	14	10	0	+10	45.2	42.1	52,168	+14.2
Liberal	2	1	0	+1	6.4	9.8	12,134	-1.5
Communist	0	0	0	0	0.0	0.9	1,108	-0.8
Ind. Conservative	0	0	0	0	0.0	0.1	400	-0.3
National Front	0	0	0	0	0.0	0.1	91	+0.1

The result had the following consequences for the total number of seats on the Council after the elections:

Party	Previous council		New council	
Party	Cllr	Ald	Cllr	Ald
Conservatives	73	25	62	25
Labour	13	5	23	5
Liberals	4	0	5	0
Total	90	30	90	30
Total	120		120	
Working majority	56	20	34	20
Working majority	76		54	

== Ward results ==
Armley
Party	Candidate	Votes	%	±%
Conservative	H. Stephenson	1,862	36.3	−2.2
Labour	W. Thurlow	1,669	32.6	+10.7
Liberal	P. Chadsworth	1,380	26.9	−2.2
Ind. Conservative	G. Atkinson	168	3.3	−2.2
Communist	P. Wilton	46	0.9	−0.7
Majority		193	3.8	−5.6
Turnout		5,125		
Conservative hold		Swing	-6.4	

Beeston
Party	Candidate	Votes	%	±%
Conservative	L. Platt	2,247	50.8	−10.3
Conservative	A. Dunn	2,208		
Labour	S. Whelan	1,734	39.2	+10.1
Labour	M. Chadwick	1,685		
Liberal	A. Webster	443	10.0	+0.2
Liberal	D. Dawson	394		
Majority		513	11.6	−20.4
Turnout		4,424		
Conservative hold		Swing		
Conservative hold		Swing	-10.2	

Bramley
Party	Candidate	Votes	%	±%
Labour	Eric Atkinson	2,334	50.1	+23.4
Conservative	D. Armitage	1,998	42.9	−11.3
Liberal	J. Coates	325	7.0	−12.1
Majority		336	7.2	−20.3
Turnout		4,657		
Labour gain from Conservative		Swing	+17.3	

Burley
Party	Candidate	Votes	%	±%
Conservative	M. Davies	1,868	49.6	−16.6
Labour	J. Sully	1,813	48.2	+22.9
Communist	T. Flynn	84	2.2	−6.3
Majority		55	1.5	−39.5
Turnout		3,765		
Conservative hold		Swing	-19.7	

Burmantofts
Party	Candidate	Votes	%	±%
Labour	K. Cohen	2,834	55.9	+9.0
Conservative	J. Brightbart	1,697	33.5	−16.3
Liberal	E. Britton	496	9.8	+9.8
Communist	F. Stockdale	40	0.8	−2.4
Majority		1,137	22.4	+19.5
Turnout		5,067		
Labour gain from Conservative		Swing	+12.6	

Castleton
Party	Candidate	Votes	%	±%
Liberal	Michael Meadowcroft	2,127	53.7	−0.9
Labour	K. Dockway	1,449	36.6	+9.0
Conservative	E. Lewis	343	8.7	−7.7
Communist	G. Corscadden	39	1.0	−0.4
Majority		678	17.1	−9.9
Turnout		3,958		
Liberal hold		Swing	-4.9	

Chapel Allerton
Party	Candidate	Votes	%	±%
Conservative	J. Long	2,854	82.3	−0.7
Labour	G. Bloom	401	11.6	+4.3
Liberal	Deryck Ernest Senior	211	6.1	−0.7
Majority		2,453	70.8	−7.9
Turnout		3,466		
Conservative hold		Swing	-3.9	

City
Party	Candidate	Votes	%	±%
Labour	Ernest Morris	1,748	65.7	+12.3
Conservative	J. Sexton	764	28.7	−14.2
Liberal	Graham Rowlands	75	2.8	+2.8
Communist	T. Johnston	72	2.7	−0.9
Majority		984	37.0	+26.4
Turnout		2,659		
Labour hold		Swing	+13.2	

Cookridge
Party	Candidate	Votes	%	±%
Conservative	S. Lyons	2,605	59.5	−14.9
Labour	W. Lodge	966	22.1	+7.0
Liberal	E. Finkle	806	18.4	+7.9
Majority		1,639	37.4	−21.9
Turnout		4,377		
Conservative hold		Swing	-10.9	

East Hunslet
Party	Candidate	Votes	%	±%
Labour	B. Pepper	1,907	66.6	+8.9
Liberal	J. Barie	581	20.3	+0.8
Conservative	I. Holmes	374	13.1	−9.7
Majority		1,326	46.3	+11.3
Turnout		2,862		
Labour hold		Swing	+4.0	

Gipton
Party	Candidate	Votes	%	±%
Labour	J. Moynihan	2,125	51.0	+14.0
Conservative	W. Buckland	1,876	45.1	−16.1
Liberal	K. Pedder	110	2.6	+2.6
Communist	J. Bellamy	53	1.3	−0.6
Majority		249	6.0	−18.1
Turnout		4,164		
Labour gain from Conservative		Swing	+15.0	

Halton
Party	Candidate	Votes	%	±%
Conservative	R. Vaughan	3,846	76.4	−9.4
Labour	W. Spence	1,129	22.4	+11.6
Communist	G. McGowan	56	1.1	−2.2
Majority		2,717	54.0	−21.0
Turnout		5,031		
Conservative hold		Swing	-10.5	

Harehills
Party	Candidate	Votes	%	±%
Conservative	J. White	1,550	64.9	−11.9
Labour	G. Wood	712	29.8	+18.1
Liberal	D. Preethy	127	5.3	−6.2
Majority		838	35.1	−29.9
Turnout		2,389		
Conservative hold		Swing	-15.0	

Headingley
Party	Candidate	Votes	%	±%
Conservative	D. Barron	2,904	71.4	−8.3
Labour	T. Cooke	1,164	28.6	+17.4
Majority		1,740	42.8	−25.6
Turnout		4,068		
Conservative hold		Swing	-12.8	

Holbeck
Party	Candidate	Votes	%	±%
Labour	D. Matthews	1,868	60.0	+12.7
Liberal	R. Whitelock	852	27.4	−2.7
Conservative	J. Spragg	392	12.6	−10.0
Majority		1,016	32.6	15.3
Turnout		3,112		
Labour hold		Swing	+7.7	

Kirkstall
Party	Candidate	Votes	%	±%
Conservative	R. Robertson	2,825	50.2	−7.7
Labour	J. Underwood	2,440	43.4	+10.7
Liberal	R. Worrall	256	4.6	−3.1
Communist	J. Sidebottom	102	1.8	+0.1
Majority		385	6.8	−18.3
Turnout		5,623		
Conservative hold		Swing	-9.2	

Middleton
Party	Candidate	Votes	%	±%
Labour	S. Binns	2,507	63.2	+9.2
Liberal	S. Robinson	803	20.3	−2.7
Conservative	G. Hartley	558	14.1	−2.3
Communist	D. Priscott	96	2.4	−4.2
Majority		1,704	43.0	+12.0
Turnout		3,964		
Labour hold		Swing	+5.9	

Moortown
Party	Candidate	Votes	%	±%
Conservative	E. Vaughan	2,668	68.6	−5.4
Labour	A. Donohoe	903	23.2	+12.0
Liberal	S. Rowland	316	8.1	−6.6
Majority		1,765	45.4	−13.9
Turnout		3,887		
Conservative hold		Swing	-8.7	

Osmondthorpe
Party	Candidate	Votes	%	±%
Labour	Douglas Gabb	2,810	61.6	+11.8
Conservative	Doreen Wood	1,694	37.1	−8.6
Communist	T. Kelly	57	1.2	−3.2
Majority		1,116	24.5	+20.4
Turnout		4,561		
Labour gain from Conservative		Swing	+10.2	

Richmond Hill
Party	Candidate	Votes	%	±%
Labour	J. Mathers	2,293	57.4	+19.4
Conservative	D. Eastham	1,547	38.7	−15.9
Liberal	A. Wren	70	1.8	−2.5
Communist	P. Fawcett	57	1.4	−1.8
National Front	B. Thurlow	31	0.8	+0.8
Majority		746	18.7	+2.1
Turnout		3,998		
Labour gain from Conservative		Swing	+17.6	

Roundhay
Party	Candidate	Votes	%	±%
Conservative	J. Challenor	3,166	85.3	−6.0
Labour	Denise Atkinson	544	14.7	+6.0
Majority		2,622	70.7	−11.9
Turnout		3,710		
Conservative hold		Swing	-6.0	

Scott Hall
Party	Candidate	Votes	%	±%
Labour	R. Ellis	1,432	48.8	+24.3
Conservative	L. Horton	1,377	46.9	−28.6
Communist	A. Dale	127	4.3	+4.3
Majority		55	1.9	−49.1
Turnout		2,936		
Labour gain from Conservative		Swing	+26.4	

Seacroft
Party	Candidate	Votes	%	±%
Labour	K. Woolmer	4,023	69.2	+22.7
Conservative	M. Freegood	1,737	29.9	−19.6
Communist	H. Besser	51	0.9	−3.0
Majority		2,286	39.3	+36.3
Turnout		5,811		
Labour gain from Conservative		Swing	+21.1	

Stanningley
Party	Candidate	Votes	%	±%
Labour	Kevin Gould	2,657	54.3	+10.4
Conservative	A. Vickers	1,800	36.8	−15.0
Liberal	V. Lockwood	390	8.0	+8.0
Communist	P. Sidebottom	43	0.9	−3.3
Majority		857	17.5	+9.6
Turnout		4,890		
Labour gain from Conservative		Swing	+12.7	

Talbot
Party	Candidate	Votes	%	±%
Conservative	R. Crousden	3,172	81.5	−6.0
Labour	R. Sedler	721	18.5	+6.0
Majority		2,451	63.0	−11.9
Turnout		3,893		
Conservative hold		Swing	-6.0	

Weetwood
Party	Candidate	Votes	%	±%
Conservative	B. Peart	3,737	77.9	−3.5
Liberal	B. Reynolds	537	11.2	−1.3
Labour	A. Baum	465	9.7	+3.5
National Front	R. Green	60	1.3	+1.3
Majority		3,200	66.7	−2.1
Turnout		4,799		
Conservative hold		Swing	-1.1	

West Hunslet
Party	Candidate	Votes	%	±%
Liberal	W. Taylor	1,710	41.4	−13.4
Labour	E. Hodkinson	1,267	30.7	+12.5
Conservative	J. Crosby	1,152	27.9	+0.9
Majority		115	10.7	−17.1
Turnout		4,129		
Liberal gain from Conservative		Swing	-12.9	

Whinmoor
Party	Candidate	Votes	%	±%
Labour	B. Coward	2,123	59.3	+10.7
Conservative	V. McNair	1,382	38.6	−10.9
Communist	J. Scawthorne	74	2.1	+0.2
Majority		741	20.7	+19.8
Turnout		3,579		
Labour gain from Conservative		Swing	+10.8	

Woodhouse
Party	Candidate	Votes	%	±%
Conservative	A. Sexton	1,735	52.4	−10.8
Labour	C. Buttery	1,468	44.3	+13.2
Communist	L. Morris	111	3.3	−2.4
Majority		267	8.1	−23.9
Turnout		3,314		
Conservative hold		Swing	-12.0	

Wortley
Party	Candidate	Votes	%	±%
Labour	J. Sargeant	2,662	46.4	+18.7
Conservative	R. Beal	2,551	44.5	−15.8
Liberal	Walter Holdsworth	519	9.1	−2.8
Majority		111	1.9	−30.6
Turnout		5,732		
Labour gain from Conservative		Swing	+17.2	
