= Batley and Morley =

Parliamentary constituency in the United Kingdom, 1918–1983

- Former borough constituency for the House of Commons

1918–1983
- Seats: one
- Created from: Morley
- Replaced by: Batley and Spen and Morley and Leeds South

Batley and Morley was a parliamentary constituency centred on the towns of Batley and Morley in West Yorkshire. It returned one Member of Parliament (MP) to the House of Commons of the Parliament of the United Kingdom.

The constituency was created for the 1918 general election, and abolished for the 1983 general election. It was then replaced by the seats of Batley and Spen & Morley and Leeds South.

== Boundaries ==
1918–1950: The Boroughs of Batley, Morley, and Ossett.

1950–1983: The Boroughs of Batley and Morley.

== Members of Parliament ==
Election	Member	Party
1918	Gerald France	Coalition Liberal
Jan 1922	Gerald France	National Liberal
1922	Ben Turner	Labour
1924	Walter Forrest	Liberal
1929	Sir Ben Turner	Labour
1931	Wilfrid Wills	Conservative
1935	Willie Brooke	Labour
1939 by-election	Hubert Beaumont	Labour
1949 by-election	Sir Alfred Broughton	Labour
1979	Ken Woolmer	Labour
1983	constituency abolished	

== Elections ==
=== Elections in the 1910s ===
General election 1918: Batley and Morley
Party		Candidate	Votes	%
C	Coalition Liberal	Gerald France	13,519	52.9
	Labour	Ben Turner	12,051	47.1
Majority			1,468	5.8
Turnout			25,570	66.9
Registered electors				
	National Liberal win (new seat)			
C indicates candidate endorsed by the coalition government.

=== Elections in the 1920s ===
J.A. Compston

General election 1922: Batley and Morley
Party	Candidate	Votes	%	±%
Labour	Ben Turner	15,005	46.1	–1.0
Liberal	John Albert Compston	9,443	29.1	–23.8
Unionist	John Potter	8,054	24.8	N/A
Majority		5,562	17.0	+11.2
Turnout		33,002	85.2	+18.3
Registered electors				
Labour gain from National Liberal		Swing		

General election 1923: Batley and Morley
Party	Candidate	Votes	%	±%
Labour	Ben Turner	14,964	52.6	+6.5
Liberal	Walter Forrest	13,480	47.4	+18.3
Majority		1,484	5.2	−11.8
Turnout		28,444	73.8	−11.4
Registered electors				
Labour hold		Swing	−5.9	

Walter Forrest

General election 1924: Batley and Morley
Party	Candidate	Votes	%	±%
Liberal	Walter Forrest	16,369	50.6	+3.2
Labour	Ben Turner	15,966	49.4	−3.2
Majority		403	1.2	N/A
Turnout		32,335	83.3	+9.5
Registered electors				
Liberal gain from Labour		Swing		

General election 1929: Batley and Morley
Party	Candidate	Votes	%	±%
Labour	Ben Turner	24,621	58.3	+8.9
Liberal	Walter Forrest	17,641	41.7	−8.9
Majority		6,980	16.6	N/A
Turnout		42,262	84.1	+0.8
Registered electors				
Labour gain from Liberal		Swing	+8.9	

=== Elections in the 1930s ===
General election 1931: Batley and Morley
Party	Candidate	Votes	%	±%
Conservative	Wilfrid Wills	26,378	61.2	New
Labour	Ben Turner	16,700	38.8	−19.5
Majority		9,678	22.4	N/A
Turnout		43,078	85.9	+1.8
Registered electors				
Conservative gain from Labour		Swing		

General election 1935: Batley and Morley
Party	Candidate	Votes	%	±%
Labour	Willie Brooke	21,182	53.6	+14.8
Conservative	Wilfrid Wills	18,354	46.4	−14.8
Majority		2,828	7.2	N/A
Turnout		39,536	79.3	−6.6
Registered electors				
Labour gain from Conservative		Swing		

1939 Batley and Morley by-election
Party	Candidate	Votes	%	±%
Labour	Hubert Beaumont	20,020	55.4	+1.8
Conservative	Wilfrid Wills	16,124	44.6	−1.8
Majority		3,896	10.8	+3.6
Turnout		36,144	72.6	−6.7
Registered electors				
Labour hold		Swing		

- Liberal Party candidate Ernest Dalton withdrew

=== Elections in the 1940s ===
General election 1945: Batley and Morley
Party	Candidate	Votes	%	±%
Labour	Hubert Beaumont	22,682	58.1	+4.5
Conservative	G W Hirst	11,090	28.4	−18.0
Liberal	Ashley Mitchell	5,256	13.5	New
Majority		11,592	29.7	+22.5
Turnout		39,028	80.9	+1.6
Registered electors				
Labour hold		Swing		

1949 Batley and Morley by-election
Party	Candidate	Votes	%	±%
Labour	Alfred Broughton	24,514	59.3	+1.2
Conservative	Arthur Maxwell Ramsden	16,828	40.7	+12.3
Majority		7,686	18.6	−11.1
Turnout		41,342		
Registered electors				
Labour hold		Swing		

=== Elections in the 1950s ===
General election 1950: Batley and Morley
Party	Candidate	Votes	%
Labour	Alfred Broughton	29,776	59.95
Conservative	Winefriede Carmen Glynne Bremner	19,891	40.05
Majority		9,885	19.90
Turnout		49,667	87.03
Registered electors		57,066	
Labour win (new boundaries)			

General election 1951: Batley and Morley
Party	Candidate	Votes	%	±%
Labour	Alfred Broughton	29,326	59.68	−0.27
Conservative	Reginald Northam	19,811	40.32	+0.27
Majority		9,515	19.36	−0.54
Turnout		49,137	85.53	−1.50
Registered electors		57,453		
Labour hold		Swing	−0.27	

General election 1955: Batley and Morley
Party	Candidate	Votes	%	±%
Labour	Alfred Broughton	27,178	60.20	+0.52
Conservative	Harry Watson	17,970	39.80	−0.52
Majority		9,208	20.40	+1.04
Turnout		45,148	79.89	−5.64
Registered electors		56,513		
Labour hold		Swing	+0.52	

General election 1959: Batley and Morley
Party	Candidate	Votes	%	±%
Labour	Alfred Broughton	26,781	58.35	−1.85
Conservative	Barbara M Garden	19,115	41.65	+1.85
Majority		7,666	16.70	−3.70
Turnout		45,896	81.91	+2.02
Registered electors		56,031		
Labour hold		Swing	−1.85	

=== Elections in the 1960s ===
General election 1964: Batley and Morley
Party	Candidate	Votes	%	±%
Labour	Alfred Broughton	23,362	52.61	−5.74
Conservative	Peter JD Marshall	13,477	30.35	−11.30
Liberal	Ivan Harvey Lester	7,564	17.03	New
Majority		9,885	22.26	+5.56
Turnout		44,403	78.68	−3.23
Registered electors		56,436		
Labour hold		Swing	+2.78	

General election 1966: Batley and Morley
Party	Candidate	Votes	%	±%
Labour	Alfred Broughton	24,086	56.16	+3.55
Conservative	Peter JD Marshall	12,435	28.99	−1.36
Liberal	EA Berry	6,366	14.84	−2.19
Majority		11,651	27.17	+4.91
Turnout		42,887	78.68	−3.36
Registered electors		56,936		
Labour hold		Swing	+2.46	

=== Elections in the 1970s ===
General election 1970: Batley and Morley
Party	Candidate	Votes	%	±%
Labour	Alfred Broughton	23,024	50.4	−5.8
Conservative	Donald Thompson	15,753	34.53	+5.5
Liberal	Peter Wrigley	6,893	15.09	+0.25
Majority		7,271	15.92	−11.25
Turnout		45,670	72.39	
Registered electors				
Labour hold		Swing		

General election February 1974: Batley and Morley
Party	Candidate	Votes	%	±%
Labour	Alfred Broughton	21,495	44.60	−5.81
Conservative	George Neill Alexander Crone	14,404	29.89	−4.60
Liberal	Peter Wrigley	11,470	23.80	+8.71
Independent Democratic Alliance	Gerald Jarratt	828	1.72	New
Majority		7,091	14.71	−1.21
Turnout		48,197	78.34	
Registered electors				
Labour hold		Swing		

General election October 1974: Batley and Morley
Party	Candidate	Votes	%	±%
Labour	Alfred Broughton	21,179	49.21	+4.61
Conservative	George Neill Alexander Crone	12,931	30.05	+0.16
Liberal	Ivan Harvey Lester	8,928	20.74	−3.05
Majority		8,248	19.16	
Turnout		43,038	69.55	
Registered electors				
Labour hold		Swing		

General election 1979: Batley and Morley
Party	Candidate	Votes	%	±%
Labour	Kenneth Woolmer	22,984	49.04	−0.17
Conservative	George Neill Alexander Crone	17,632	37.62	+7.58
Liberal	Christopher Julian Cawood	4,943	10.55	−10.20
Independent Labour	Douglas Parkin	848	1.81	New
Ecology	Clive Lord	460	0.98	New
Majority		5,352	11.42	
Turnout		46,867	74.54	
Registered electors				
Labour hold		Swing		
