= Doncaster (constituency) =

Parliamentary constituency in the United Kingdom, 1885–1983

- Former county constituency for the House of Commons
- County: West Riding of Yorkshire, then South Yorkshire

1885–1983
- Seats: One
- Created from: Southern West Riding of Yorkshire
- Replaced by: Doncaster Central and Don Valley

Doncaster was a Parliamentary constituency covering the town of Doncaster in England. It was created in 1885 and abolished in 1983.

== Boundaries ==
1885–1918: The Borough of Doncaster, and parts of the Sessional Divisions of Lower Strafforth and Tickhill, and Upper Strafforth and Tickhill.

1918–1950: The Borough of Doncaster, and the Urban Districts of Adwick-le-Street and Bentley-with-Arksey.

1950–1983: The County Borough of Doncaster.

The area formerly covered by this constituency is now mostly in the Doncaster Central and Doncaster North constituencies.

== Members of Parliament ==
Election	Member	Party
1885	Walter Shirley Shirley	Liberal
1888 by-election	Hon. Henry Wentworth-FitzWilliam	Liberal Unionist
1892	Charles James Fleming	Liberal
1895	Frederick Fison	Conservative
1906	Charles Nicholson	Liberal
1916	Charles Nicholson	Coalition Liberal
1918	Reginald Nicholson	Coalition Liberal
Jan 1922	Reginald Nicholson	National Liberal
Nov 1922	Wilfred Paling	Labour
1931	Hugh Molson	Conservative
1935	Alfred Short	Labour
1938 by-election	John Morgan	Labour
1941 by-election	Evelyn Walkden	Labour
1950	Ray Gunter	Labour
1951	Anthony Barber	Conservative
1964	Harold Walker	Labour
1983	constituency abolished: see Doncaster Central & Doncaster North	

== Election results ==
=== Elections in the 1970s ===
General election 1979: Doncaster
Party	Candidate	Votes	%	±%
Labour	Harold Walker	22,184	48.9	−2.4
Conservative	P. Beard	19,208	42.4	+8.3
Liberal	Gerald Broadhead	3,646	8.0	−6.7
National Front	M. Day	300	0.7	New
Majority		2,976	6.5	−10.7
Turnout		45,338	75.0	+2.2
Labour hold		Swing		

General election October 1974: Doncaster
Party	Candidate	Votes	%	±%
Labour	Harold Walker	22,177	51.3	+3.4
Conservative	J. Wilkinson	14,747	34.1	−2.4
Liberal	W. J. Davidson	6,336	14.7	−0.9
Majority		7,430	17.2	+5.8
Turnout		43,260	72.8	−8.9
Labour hold		Swing		

General election February 1974: Doncaster
Party	Candidate	Votes	%	±%
Labour	Harold Walker	23,041	47.9	−2.8
Conservative	K. I. Tunnicliffe	17,565	36.5	−6.9
Liberal	W. J. Davidson	7,590	15.6	+9.7
Majority		5,476	11.4	+4.1
Turnout		48,196	81.7	+6.9
Labour hold		Swing		

General election 1970: Doncaster
Party	Candidate	Votes	%	±%
Labour	Harold Walker	22,658	50.7	−6.0
Conservative	Peter Davies	19,431	43.4	+0.1
Liberal	Tom Blades	2,648	5.9	New
Majority		3,227	7.3	−6.1
Turnout		44,737	74.8	−6.4
Labour hold		Swing		

=== Elections in the 1960s ===
General election 1966: Doncaster
Party	Candidate	Votes	%	±%
Labour	Harold Walker	25,777	56.7	+6.8
Conservative	J. M. Whittaker	19,689	43.3	−4.3
Majority		6,088	13.4	+11.1
Turnout		45,466	81.2	−1.5
Labour hold		Swing		

General election 1964: Doncaster
Party	Candidate	Votes	%	±%
Labour	Harold Walker	23,845	49.9	+3.5
Conservative	Anthony Barber	22,732	47.6	−6.0
Independent	Gerald Broadhead	1,201	2.5	New
Majority		1,113	2.3	N/A
Turnout		47,778	82.7	−1.8
Labour gain from Conservative		Swing		

=== Elections in the 1950s ===
General election 1959: Doncaster
Party	Candidate	Votes	%	±%
Conservative	Anthony Barber	26,521	53.6	+1.8
Labour	Ted Garrett	22,935	46.4	−1.9
Majority		3,586	7.3	+3.8
Turnout		49,456	84.5	+3.7
Conservative hold		Swing		

General election 1955: Doncaster
Party	Candidate	Votes	%	±%
Conservative	Anthony Barber	24,598	51.8	+1.4
Labour	Ray Gunter	22,938	48.3	−1.3
Majority		1,660	3.5	+2.7
Turnout		47,536	81.8	−4.4
Conservative hold		Swing		

General election 1951: Doncaster
Party	Candidate	Votes	%	±%
Conservative	Anthony Barber	25,005	50.4	+1.3
Labour	Ray Gunter	24,621	49.6	−1.3
Majority		384	0.8	N/A
Turnout		49,626	86.2	+0.6
Conservative gain from Labour		Swing		

General election 1950: Doncaster
Party	Candidate	Votes	%
Labour	Ray Gunter	24,449	50.9
Conservative	Anthony Barber	23,571	49.1
Majority		878	1.8
Turnout		48,020	85.6
Labour win (new boundaries)			

=== Elections in the 1940s ===
General election 1945: Doncaster
Party	Candidate	Votes	%	±%
Labour	Evelyn Walkden	40,050	70.2	+12.6
Conservative	Henry Archibald Taylor	16,999	29.8	−12.6
Majority		23,051	40.4	+25.2
Turnout		57,049	74.5	−3.2
Labour hold		Swing		

In the 1941 Doncaster by-election, Evelyn Walkden was elected unopposed.

=== Elections in the 1930s ===
1938 Doncaster by-election
Party	Candidate	Votes	%	±%
Labour	John Morgan	31,735	61.3	+3.7
National Liberal	Alex Monteith	20,027	38.7	−3.7
Majority		11,708	22.6	+7.4
Turnout		51,762	75.4	−2.3
Labour hold		Swing		

General election 1935: Doncaster
Party	Candidate	Votes	%	±%
Labour	Alfred Short	29,963	57.6	+12.5
Conservative	Hugh Molson	22,011	42.4	−2.7
Majority		7,952	15.2	N/A
Turnout		51,974	77.7	0.0
Labour gain from Conservative		Swing		

General election 1931: Doncaster
Party	Candidate	Votes	%	±%
Conservative	Hugh Molson	27,205	54.9	+30.5
Labour	Wilfred Paling	22,363	45.1	−10.9
Majority		4,842	9.8	N/A
Turnout		50,068	77.7	+0.1
Conservative gain from Labour		Swing		

=== Elections in the 1920s ===
General election 1929: Doncaster
Party	Candidate	Votes	%	±%
Labour	Wilfred Paling	25,295	56.0	+3.3
Unionist	Ernest Albert Phillips	11,016	24.4	−22.9
Liberal	J. T. Clarke	8,842	19.6	New
Majority		14,279	31.6	+26.2
Turnout		45,103	77.6	+0.6
Registered electors		58,213		
Labour hold		Swing	+13.1	

General election 1924: Doncaster
Party	Candidate	Votes	%	±%
Labour	Wilfred Paling	16,496	52.7	−7.9
Unionist	A. S. Matthews	14,800	47.3	+7.9
Majority		1,696	5.4	−15.8
Turnout		31,296	77.0	+8.6
Registered electors		40,633		
Labour hold		Swing	−7.9	

General election 1923: Doncaster
Party	Candidate	Votes	%	±%
Labour	Wilfred Paling	16,198	60.6	+14.1
Unionist	William St Andrew Warde-Aldam	10,514	39.4	+10.7
Majority		5,684	21.2	+3.4
Turnout		26,712	68.4	−9.0
Registered electors		39,027		
Labour hold		Swing	+1.7	

General election 1922: Doncaster
Party	Candidate	Votes	%	±%
Labour	Wilfred Paling	13,437	46.5	+21.5
Unionist	Robert Calverley Allington Bewicke-Copley	8,279	28.7	N/A
National Liberal	Reginald Nicholson	7,161	24.8	−50.2
Majority		5,158	17.8	N/A
Turnout		28,877	77.4	+18.8
Registered electors		37,310		
Labour gain from National Liberal		Swing	+35.9	

=== Elections in the 1910s ===
R. Nicholson

General election 1918: Doncaster
Party		Candidate	Votes	%
C	National Liberal	Reginald Nicholson	15,431	75.0
	Labour	Robert Morley	5,153	25.0
Majority			10,278	50.0
Turnout			20,584	58.6
Registered electors			35,114	
	National Liberal win (new boundaries)			
C indicates candidate endorsed by the coalition government.

C.N. Nicholson

General election December 1910: Doncaster
Party	Candidate	Votes	%	±%
Liberal	Charles Nicholson	9,240	58.0	−2.1
Conservative	Charles Warwick Whitworth	6,696	42.0	+2.1
Majority		2,544	16.0	−4.2
Turnout		15,936	74.1	−8.4
Registered electors		21,511		
Liberal hold		Swing	−2.1	

General election January 1910: Doncaster
Party	Candidate	Votes	%	±%
Liberal	Charles Nicholson	10,654	60.1	−2.2
Conservative	Charles Warwick Whitworth	7,085	39.9	+2.2
Majority		3,569	20.2	−4.4
Turnout		17,739	82.5	+2.4
Registered electors		21,511		
Liberal hold		Swing	−2.2	

=== Elections in the 1900s ===
General election 1906: Doncaster
Party	Candidate	Votes	%	±%
Liberal	Charles Nicholson	9,315	62.3	+13.7
Conservative	Frederick Fison	5,646	37.7	−13.7
Majority		3,669	24.6	N/A
Turnout		14,961	80.1	+2.3
Registered electors		18,682		
Liberal gain from Conservative		Swing	+13.7	

General election 1900: Doncaster
Party	Candidate	Votes	%	±%
Conservative	Frederick Fison	6,512	51.4	+0.8
Liberal	A. W. Black	6,147	48.6	−0.8
Majority		365	2.8	+1.6
Turnout		12,659	77.8	−6.8
Registered electors		16,276		
Conservative hold		Swing	+0.8	

=== Elections in the 1890s ===
General election 1895: Doncaster
Party	Candidate	Votes	%	±%
Conservative	Frederick Fison	6,098	50.6	+1.8
Liberal	Joseph Walton	5,957	49.4	−1.8
Majority		141	1.2	N/A
Turnout		12,055	84.6	+6.2
Registered electors		14,247		
Conservative gain from Liberal		Swing	+1.8	

General election 1892: Doncaster
Party	Candidate	Votes	%	±%
Liberal	Charles Fleming	5,831	51.2	−0.2
Liberal Unionist	William Wentworth-Fitzwilliam	5,552	48.8	+0.2
Majority		279	2.4	−0.4
Turnout		11,383	78.4	+3.5
Registered electors		14,521		
Liberal hold		Swing	−0.2	

=== Elections in the 1880s ===
By-election, 23 Feb 1888: Doncaster
Party	Candidate	Votes	%	±%
Liberal Unionist	William Wentworth-Fitzwilliam	5,634	51.0	+2.4
Liberal	Joseph Balfour	5,423	49.0	−2.4
Majority		211	2.0	N/A
Turnout		11,057	83.4	+8.5
Registered electors		13,252		
Conservative gain from Liberal		Swing	+2.4	

General election 1886: Doncaster
Party	Candidate	Votes	%	±%
Liberal	Walter Shirley	5,060	51.4	−3.3
Liberal Unionist	William Wentworth-Fitzwilliam	4,792	48.6	+3.3
Majority		268	2.8	−6.6
Turnout		9,852	74.9	−4.0
Registered electors		13,157		
Liberal hold		Swing	−3.3	

General election 1885: Doncaster
Party	Candidate	Votes	%
Liberal	Walter Shirley	5,680	54.7
Conservative	Alfred Gathorne-Hardy	4,700	45.3
Majority		980	9.4
Turnout		10,380	78.9
Registered electors		13,157	
Liberal win (new seat)			

== Sources ==
- Leigh Rayment's Historical List of MPs – Constituencies beginning with "D" (part 2)
- Richard Kimber's Political Science Resources (Election results since 1951)
