= Nicholson baronets of Harrington Gardens (1912) =

Escutcheon of the Nicholson baronets of Harrington Gardens

The Nicholson baronetcy, of Harrington Gardens in the Royal Borough of Kensington, was created in the Baronetage of the United Kingdom on 7 February 1912 for Charles Norris Nicholson, Member of Parliament for Doncaster between 1906 and 1918.

His grandson, the 2nd Baronet, was Chairman of the Ocean Steamship Company and of Martins Bank and also served as Lord-Lieutenant of the Isle of Wight from 1980 to 1986. The title is now held by his son, the 3rd Baronet, who succeeded in 1993.

== Nicholson baronets, of Harrington Gardens (1912) ==
- Sir Charles Norris Nicholson, 1st Baronet (1857–1918), MP for Doncaster 1906–1918.
- Sir John Norris Nicholson, 2nd Baronet (1911–1993), Lord Lieutenant Isle of Wight 1980–1985.
- Sir Charles Christian Nicholson, 3rd Baronet (born 1941).

The heir presumptive is the present holder's brother James Richard Lothian Nicholson (born 1947).

== Extended family ==
- The 1st Baronet's son George Crossfield Norris Nicholson (1884–1916) was Principal Private Secretary to J. E. B. Seely, and father to the 2nd Baronet by his marriage to Evelyn Izme Murray, daughter of the 1st Viscount Elibank. He was a captain in the Royal Flying Corps, killed in a flying accident. His widow Evelyn married, secondly in 1917, Seely who by then was 1st Baron Mottistone.

== Notes ==
Baronetage of the United Kingdom
Preceded by Neumann baronets	Nicholson baronets of Harrington Gardens; 7 February 1912	Succeeded by Ralli baronets
