= Fison =

Fison may refer to:

- Clavering Fison (1892–1985), English businessman and politician
- Frederick Fison (1847–1927), English mill owner and politician
- Joe Fison (1906–1972), Anglican bishop
- Lorimer Fison (1832–1907), Austrian anthropologist
- William Fison (1890–1964), British rower
- Fison baronets, a title in the Baronetage of the United Kingdom

== See also ==
- Fisons, a British multinational pharmaceutical, scientific instruments and horticultural chemicals company
- Phison, a Taiwanese public electronics company
