= Fyson =

Fyson is a surname, and may refer to:

- Leslie Fyson (1923–1996), English singer
- Mark Fyson (born 1981), British acrobatic gymnast
- Philip Fyson (1846–1928), English Anglican bishop
- Philip Furley Fyson (1877–1947), British botanist and educator

== See also ==
- Fison, surname
