= Annie Russell Merrylees =

British artist (1866–1959)

Annie Russell Arnold (née Merrylees; 19 December 1866 – 5 September 1959) was a British miniature painter who worked in Scotland.

== Life ==
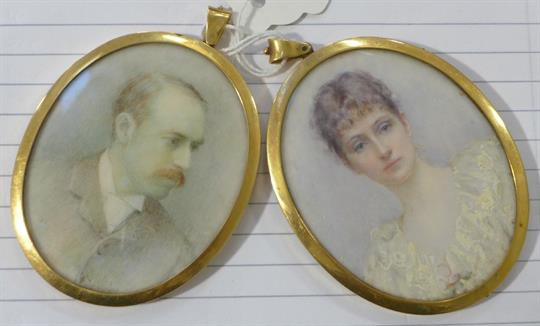
Annie R. Merrylees's pair of oils on ivory of Archibald and Alice Cameron Corbett

She was born in Birkenhead, Cheshire, England in 1866. She studied in Edinburgh, first in the School of Art, under Mr. Hodder, and later in the life class of Robert Macgregor; afterward in Paris under Jean-Joseph Benjamin-Constant. Arnold thought it important for miniature painters to do work in a more realistic medium occasionally, and something of a bolder character than can be done in their speciality.

She never studied miniature painting, but took it up at the request of a patroness who complained that she could find no one who painted miniatures. This lady gave the artist a number of the Girl's Own Paper, containing directions for miniature painting, after which Arnold began to work in this speciality. She painted a miniature of Lady Evelyn Cavendish, owned by the Marquis of Lansdowne; others of the Earl and Countess of Mar and Kellie, the first of which belongs to the Royal Scottish Academy; one of Lady Helen Vincent, one of Edith Phillips, the daughter of Lionel Phillips, and several for prominent families in Baltimore and Washington, D.C.

Her work was exhibited in the exhibitions of the Royal Academy of Arts, London. In 1903, she exhibited miniatures of Miss M. L. Fenton, the late Mrs. Cameron Corbett, and the Hon. Thomas Erskine, younger son of the Earl of Mar and Kellie.

She married Reginald E. Arnold (d. 1938), a sculptor. For a time, her address was 7 Gloucester Mansions, Harrington Gardens, London, S.W. She died in Ascot, Berkshire, in 1959, aged 92.

== Selected works ==
- Dorothy Girt in Barnard
- Lady Helen Vincent
- A Little Flower of France
- Miss Mischief
