= Martin White =

Martin White may refer to:

- Martin White (politician) (1857–1928), Scottish businessman and Liberal Member of Parliament
- Martin White (comedian) (fl. 2000s–2010s), English musician, comedian and animator
- Max Martin (born 1971), Swedish music producer and songwriter known for a time as Martin White
- Martin White (hurler) (1909–2011), Irish hurler
- Martin White (astronomer), 2011 Guggenheim Fellowship recipient
- Martin White (director) (1939–2022), pseudonym of the Italian film director Mario Bianchi
- Martin White (British Army officer) (born 1944)
- Martin White (Royal Navy officer) (1779–1865), Royal Navy admiral and hydrologist

== See also ==
- Minor White (Minor Martin White, 1908–1976), American photographer
