= Ralli baronets =

Baronetcy in the Baronetage of the United Kingdom

- Escutcheon of the Ralli baronets of Park Street
- Creation date: 1912
- Status: extant
- Seats: Panworth Hall Farm, Ashill, Norfolk
- Former seats: 15a Kensington Palace Gardens; Beaurepaire Park
- Motto: ΒΑΔΙΖΕ ΤΗΝ ΕΥΘΕΙΑΝ, go straight ahead

The Ralli baronetcy, of Park Street in the City of Westminster, is a title in the Baronetage of the United Kingdom. It was created on 8 February 1912 for Lucas Ralli, head of the firm of Ralli Brothers, London merchants. The Ralli family left Chios, after the Chios massacre.

== Ralli baronets, of Park Street (1912) ==
- Sir Lucas Eustratio Ralli, 1st Baronet (1846–1931
- Sir Eustratio Lucas "Strati" Ralli, 2nd Baronet (1876–1964)
- Sir Godfrey Victor Ralli, 3rd Baronet (1915–2010)
- Sir David Charles Ralli, 4th Baronet (born 1946)

The heir apparent is the current holder's son Philip Neil David Ralli (born 1983).

== Notes ==
Baronetage of the United Kingdom
| Preceded by Nicholson baronets | Ralli baronets of Park Street; 8 February 1912 | Succeeded by Skinner baronets |
