= E. Beresford Chancellor =

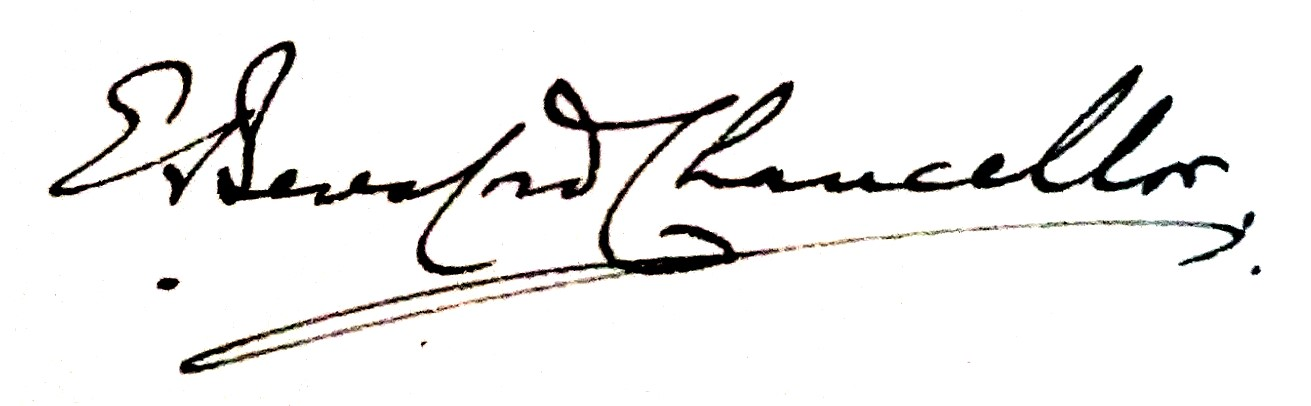
E. Beresford Chancellor's signature from The Lives of the Rakes, 1924.

Edwin Beresford Chancellor FRHS FSA (1868 – 4 February 1937) was an English author known for his works on the history of London and it environs. He wrote his first book, Historical Richmond (1885), when only 17 years old. In 1924-25, he completed a six-volume history of The Lives of the Rakes.

== Early life and family ==
Edwin Beresford Chancellor was born in Richmond, Surrey, in 1868 to Albert Chancellor, an estate agent, and his wife Emma. He read history at the University of Oxford. He married Ellen Porter in Bromley, Kent, in 1894. They had two sons, Richard and Francis. Chancellor's second marriage was to Constance Lilian May Crouch in Hastings, Sussex, in 1930.

== Career ==
Chancellor's early career was as a land and estate agent. By the time of the 1911 census he was describing himself as an author.

His first book was Historical Richmond (1885) on the history of his place of birth. The foreword contained a note explaining that, being only 17 years of age, he had been prevented from examining the printed books in the British Museum (now in the British Library) but through the kindness of professor Sir Richard Owen he had been able to examine the manuscripts. The book was nonetheless deposited in the Museum's library. At the time of writing the foreword, he was resident at The Retreat, Richmond. He returned to this subject in detail in 1894 with his History and Antiquities of Richmond etc. which was described in The Spectator as "monstrous in size" and probably containing "everything that anybody could want; but then it also has not a little that nobody wants."

His Literary Types: Being Essays in Criticism was published in 1895 when Chancellor was living at Orchardene, Bedford Park.

His six-volume The Lives of the Rakes was published by Philip Allan in 1924/25, in a limited edition of 300 sets.

He was a Fellow of the Royal Historical Society and of the Society of Antiquaries of London.

== Death and legacy ==
Chancellor died on 4 February 1937 at 31 Queen's Gate, South Kensington, London, leaving an estate of £5,368. His address at the time of his death was Aban Court Hotel, Harrington Gardens, South Kensington. Probate was granted in London to his widow Constance.

== Selected publications ==
=== Early works ===
- Historical Richmond. George Bell & Sons, London, 1885.
- The Life of Charles I., 1600-1625. Taken from Authentic Sources. G. Bell & Sons, London, 1886.
- Essays and Studies. Literary and Historical. Bemrose & Co., London, 1891.
- The History and Antiquities of Richmond, Kew, Petersham, Ham, &c. Hiscoke, Richmond, 1894.
- Literary Types: Being Essays in Criticism. S. Sonnenschein, London, 1895.

=== 1900s ===
- The History of the Squares of London, Topographical & Historical. Kegan Paul, Trench, Trübner, London, 1907.
- The Private Palaces of London Past and Present. Kegan Paul, London, 1908.
- Wanderings in Piccadilly, Mayfair, and Pall Mall. Alston Rivers, London, 1908.
- The Lives of the British Architects from William of Wykeham to Sir William Chambers. Duckworth, London, 1909.

=== 1910s ===
- The Lives of the British Sculptors, and those who have worked in England from the earliest days to Sir Francis Chantrey. Chapman & Hall, London, 1911.
- The Annals of Fleet Street: Its Traditions & Associations. Chapman & Hall, London, 1912.
- The Annals of the Strand. Topographical and Historical. Chapman & Hall, London, 1912.

=== 1920s ===
- The XVIIIth century in London. An Account of its Social Life and Arts. B.T. Batsford, London, 1920.
- Memorials of St. James's Street together with the Annals of Almack's. Grant Richards, London, 1922.
- The London of Charles Dickens. Grant Richards, London, 1924.
- The Pleasure Haunts of London during Four Centuries. Constable, London, 1925.
- Life in Regency and early Victorian times: An Account of the Days of Brummell and D'Orsay, 1800 to 1850. Batsford, London, 1926.
- Lost London: Being a Description of Landmarks which have Disappeared, pictured by J. Crowther, circa 1879-87 and described by E. B. Chancellor. Constable, London, 1926.
- The West End of Yesterday and Today: Being Studies in London's History and Topography during the Past Century. Architectural Press, London, 1926.
- Disappearing London. The Studio, London, 1927. (Editor and introduction)

=== 1930s ===
- The Literary Ghosts of London: Homes and Footprints of Famous Men and Women. Richards, London, 1933.
- London Recalled: Being a Topographical Description of the Collection of Water-colour Drawings by W. Alister MacDonald in the Guildhall Art Gallery. Basil Blackwell, Oxford, 1937.

=== The Lives of the Rakes ===
- Vol. I, Old Rowley (King Charles II). Philip Allan, London, 1924.
- Vol. II, The Restoration Rakes. Philip Allan, London, 1924.
- Vol. III, Col. Charteris and the Duke of Wharton. Philip Allan, London, 1925.
- Vol. IV, The Hell-Fire Club. Philip Allan, London, 1925.
- Vol. V, "Old Q" and Barrymore. Philip Allan, London, 1925.
- Vol. VI, The Regency Rakes. Philip Allan, London, 1925.

=== Articles ===
- "Tallis's Street Views of London". London Topographical Record, Vol. XII, 1920, pp. 67–77.
