= Charles Christian Nicholson =

British peer

Sir Charles Christian Nicholson, 3rd Baronet (born 15 December 1941) is a British baronet.

The elder son of Sir John Norris Nicholson, 2nd Baronet, and Vittoria Vivien née Trewhella, he has two sisters and one brother, James Nicholson (born 1947), who is heir presumptive to the baronetcy.

Sir Charles was educated at Ampleforth College before going up to Magdalen College, Oxford.

In 1975 he married Martha née Don, widow of Niall Anstruther-Gough-Calthorpe, and has one step son and one step daughter.

Baronetage of the United Kingdom
Preceded by Sir John Nicholson, 2nd Bt	Baronet (of Harrington Gardens); 1993–present	Incumbent
