= Cooper baronets of Hursley (1905) =

Escutcheon of the Cooper baronets of Hursley

The Cooper baronetcy of Hursley Park in the parish of Hursley in the County of Southampton was created in the Baronetage of the United Kingdom on 26 July 1905 for George Alexander Cooper. The title became extinct on the death of the 2nd Baronet in 1961.

== Cooper baronets of Hursley (1905) ==
- Sir George Alexander Cooper, 1st Baronet (1856–1940)
- Sir George James Robertson Cooper, 2nd Baronet (1890–1961)

== Notes ==
Baronetage of the United Kingdom
Preceded by Birkin baronets	Cooper baronets of Hursley; 26 July 1905	Succeeded by Fison baronets
