= Anton Mauve =

Dutch painter (1838–1888)

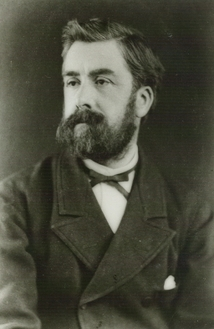
- Born: 18 September 1838; Zaandam, Netherlands
- Died: 5 February 1888 (aged 49); Arnhem, Netherlands
- Known for: Painting
- Movement: Realism
- Patrons: Goupil & Cie

Anthonij "Anton" Rudolf Mauve (Dutch pronunciation: [ˈɑntɔn ˈmʌuvə]; 18 September 1838 – 5 February 1888) was a Dutch realist painter who was a leading member of the Hague School. He signed his paintings 'A. Mauve' or with a monogrammed 'A.M.'. A master colorist, he was a very significant early influence on his cousin-in-law Vincent van Gogh.

His best-known paintings depict peasants working in the fields. His paintings of flocks of sheep were especially popular with American patrons, so popular that a price differential developed between scenes of "sheep coming" and "sheep going".

== Life and work ==
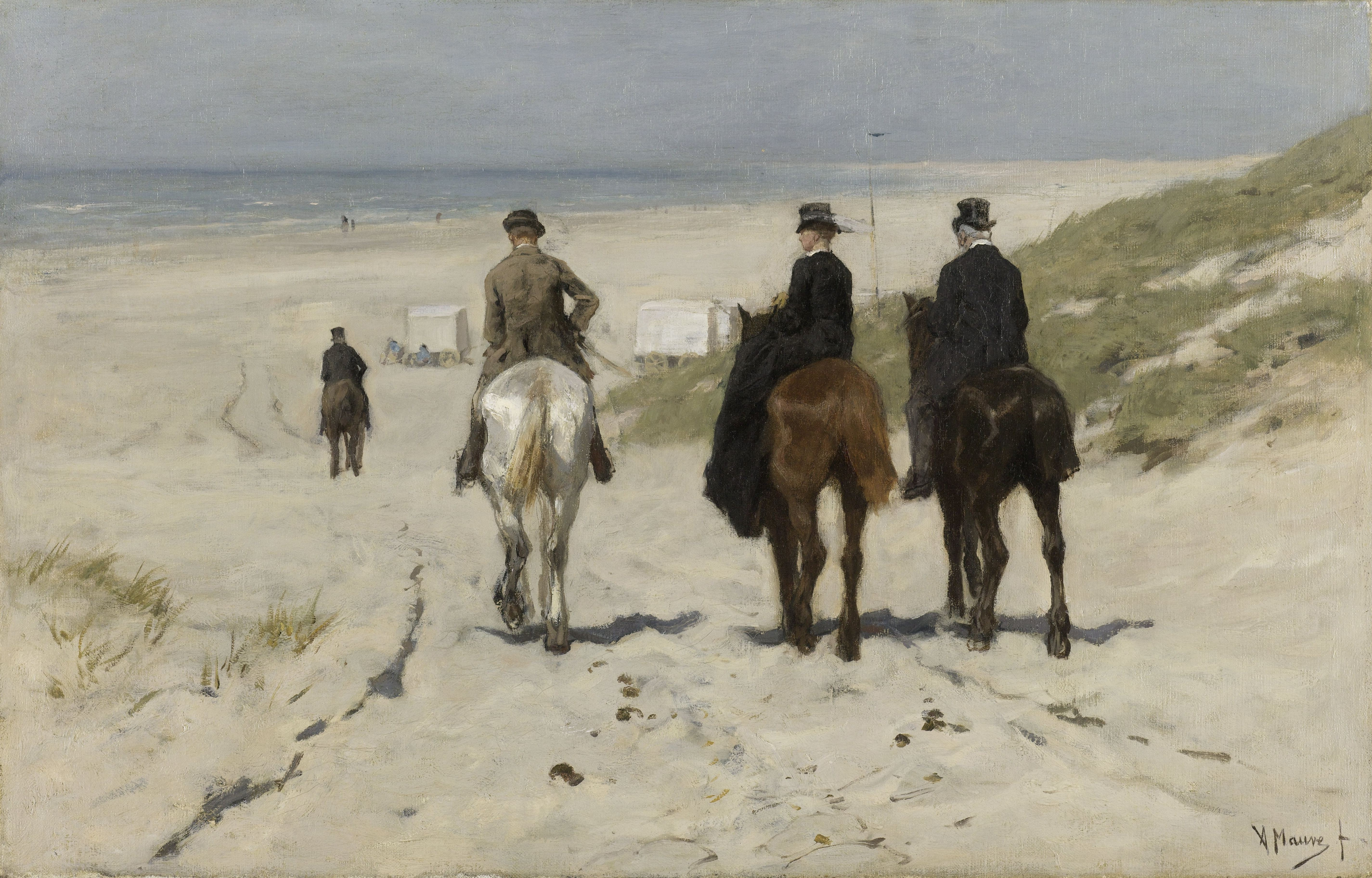
Morning Ride on the Beach (1876), oil on canvas, Rijksmuseum

Anton Mauve was born on 18 September 1838 in Zaandam, a town in the Dutch province of North Holland. A year after his birth, his father Willem Carel Mauve, a Mennonite chaplain, was sent to Haarlem, the capital city of the province where Mauve grew up.

He was apprenticed to the painter Pieter Frederik van Os followed by Wouter Verschuur. In his further development he worked with Paul Gabriël, painting from nature, and they regularly stayed and worked together at Oosterbeek, the 'Dutch Barbizon'. He was a friend of renowned Dutch landscape painters Jozef Israëls and Willem Maris and, encouraged by their example, he abandoned his early highly finished manner for a freer, looser method of painting, and the brilliant palette of his youthful work for a tender lyric harmony which is generally restricted to delicate greys, greens, and light blue.

Most of Mauve's work depicts people and animals in outdoor settings. In his Morning Ride in the Rijksmuseum, for example, fashionable equestrians at the seacoast are seen riding away from the viewer. An unconventional detail, horse droppings in the foreground, attests his commitment to realism.

In 1872, Mauve settled in The Hague where he became a leading member of the Hague School of painters and one of the founders of the Hollandsche Teekenmaatschappij in 1876, as well as playing a leading role in the development of the Pulchri Studio, The Hague's most influential art society at the time. In November 1874 he married Ariëtte (Jet) Carbentus (1856–1894), and together they had a son, Anton (1876–1962), who also became a painter.

Around 1900, Mauve's work was highly admired internationally, particularly in the United States. During the American Gilded Age, paintings of the Hague School were actively collected by wealthy American collectors and industrialists. Through art dealers such as M. Knoedler & Co., works by Anton Mauve entered important American collections and museums, including The Timber Truck, now in the Carnegie Museum of Art in Pittsburgh.

In the last two years of his life, Mauve settled in the village of Laren in the region surrounding Hilversum called the Gooi area. The group of painters who settled there, including Jozef Israëls and Albert Neuhuys, came to be known collectively as the Larense School and the region around the Gooi was dubbed 'Mauve land' as far afield as the United States. Mauve influenced many other painters one of whom was the Scottish painter, Robert McGregor (1847–1922).

Mauve died suddenly in Arnhem on 5 February 1888.

== Relationship with Vincent van Gogh ==
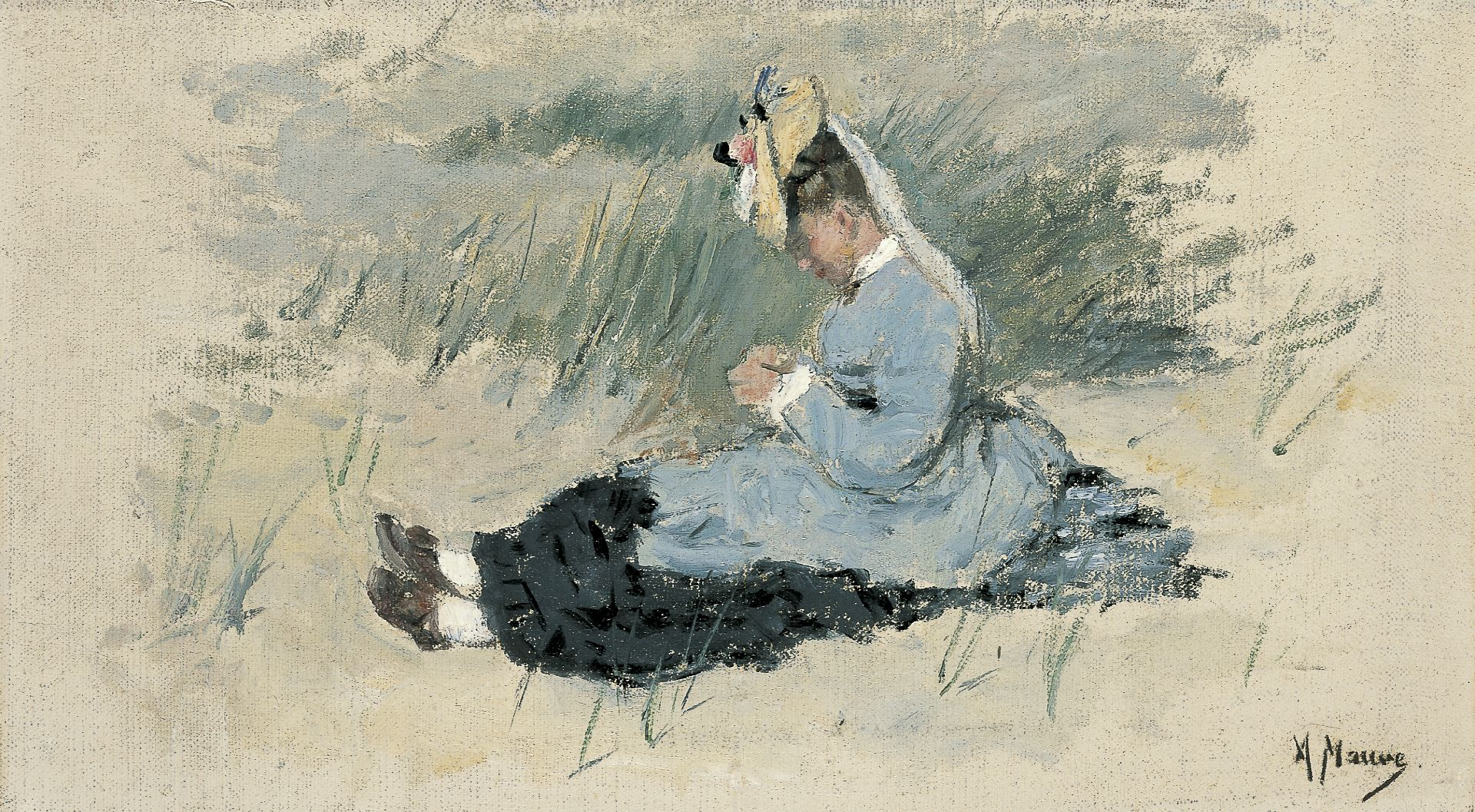
Ariëtte (Jet) Carbentus, the Artist's Wife, in the Dunes. She was a cousin of van Gogh on his mother's side.

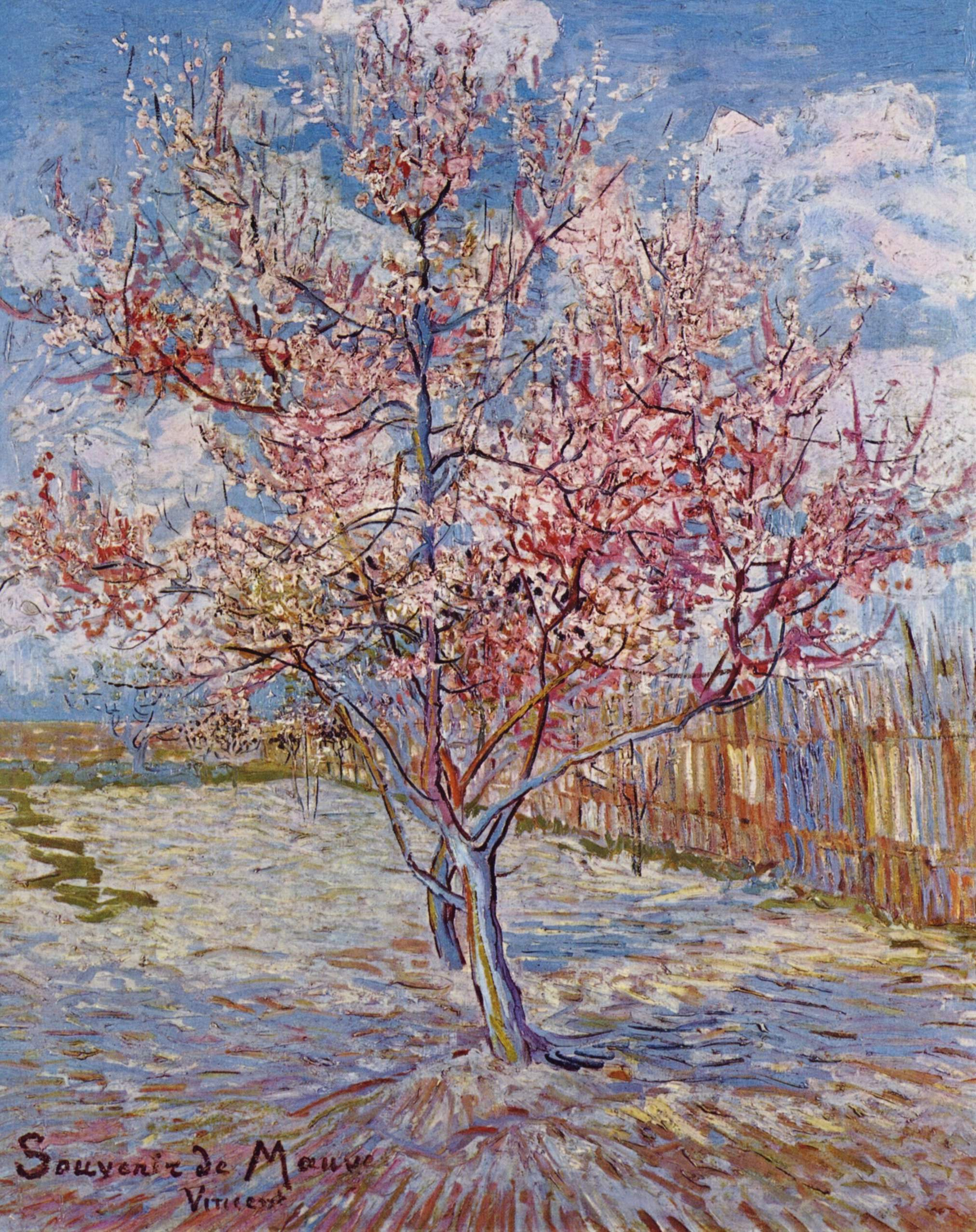
Vincent van Gogh, Souvenir de Mauve (c. 30 March 1888), oil on canvas, Kröller-Müller Museum

Mauve was married to van Gogh's cousin Ariëtte (Jet) Sophia Jeannette Carbentus, and he was a major influence on van Gogh, who revered him. He is mentioned, directly or indirectly, in 152 of van Gogh's surviving letters.

Van Gogh spent three weeks at Mauve's studio at the end of 1881 and during that time he made his first experiments in painting under Mauve's tutelage, first in oils and then early the next year in watercolour (previously he had concentrated on drawing). Mauve continued to encourage him and lent him money to rent and furnish a studio, but later grew cold towards him and did not return a number of letters.

In a letter to his brother Theo van Gogh dated 7 May 1882, van Gogh describes "a very regrettable conversation" in which Mauve told him their association was "over and done with" adding by way of explanation that van Gogh had a vicious character. Van Gogh continued his letter by expressing his sorrow, and then launches defiantly into a passionate defence of his relationship with Clasina "Sien" Maria Hornik (Sien), a pregnant prostitute he had befriended.

The presumption must be that Mauve had heard of the relationship (although van Gogh's letter does not say so expressly) and broke off the association because of it. However, their relationship had already become strained by late January. Nevertheless, van Gogh continued to hold Mauve in very high esteem and dedicated one of his most iconic paintings to Mauve's memory after hearing of his sudden death.

Now here, for instance, at this moment, I have 6 paintings of blossoming fruit trees. And the one I brought home today would possibly appeal to you — it’s a dug-over patch of ground in an orchard, a wicker fence and two peach trees in full bloom, pink against a sparkling blue sky with white clouds and in sunshine. You may well see it, since I’ve decided to send this one to Jet Mauve. I’ve written on it 'Souvenir de Mauve Vincent & Theo'.

Mauve's mother Elisabeth Margaretha Hirschig was a first cousin twice removed of Anton Hirschig, the young Dutch artist who was a fellow lodger with van Gogh at the Auberge Ravoux at the time of van Gogh's death.

== Selected works ==
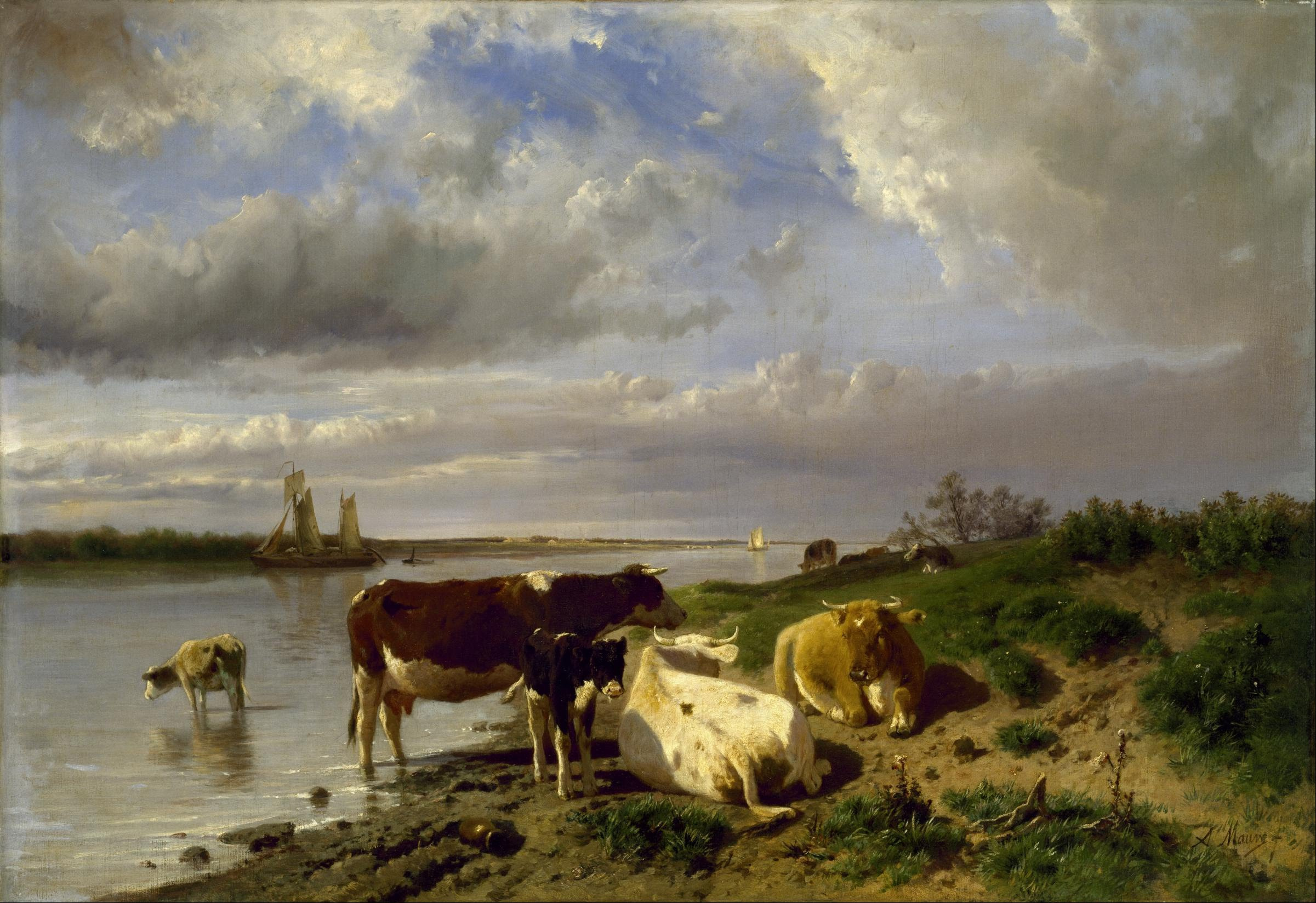
Landscape with cattle

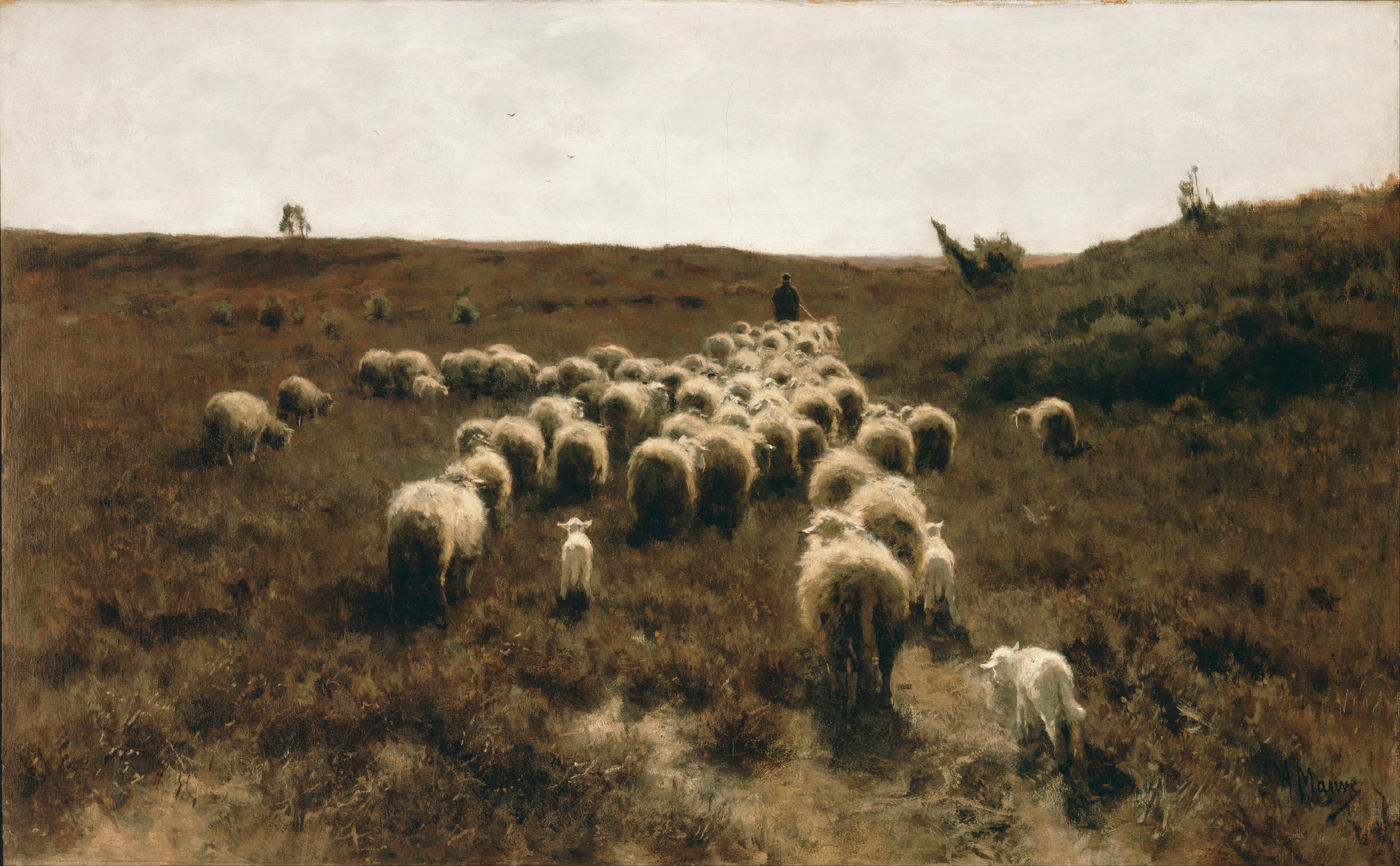
The Return of the Flock, Laren

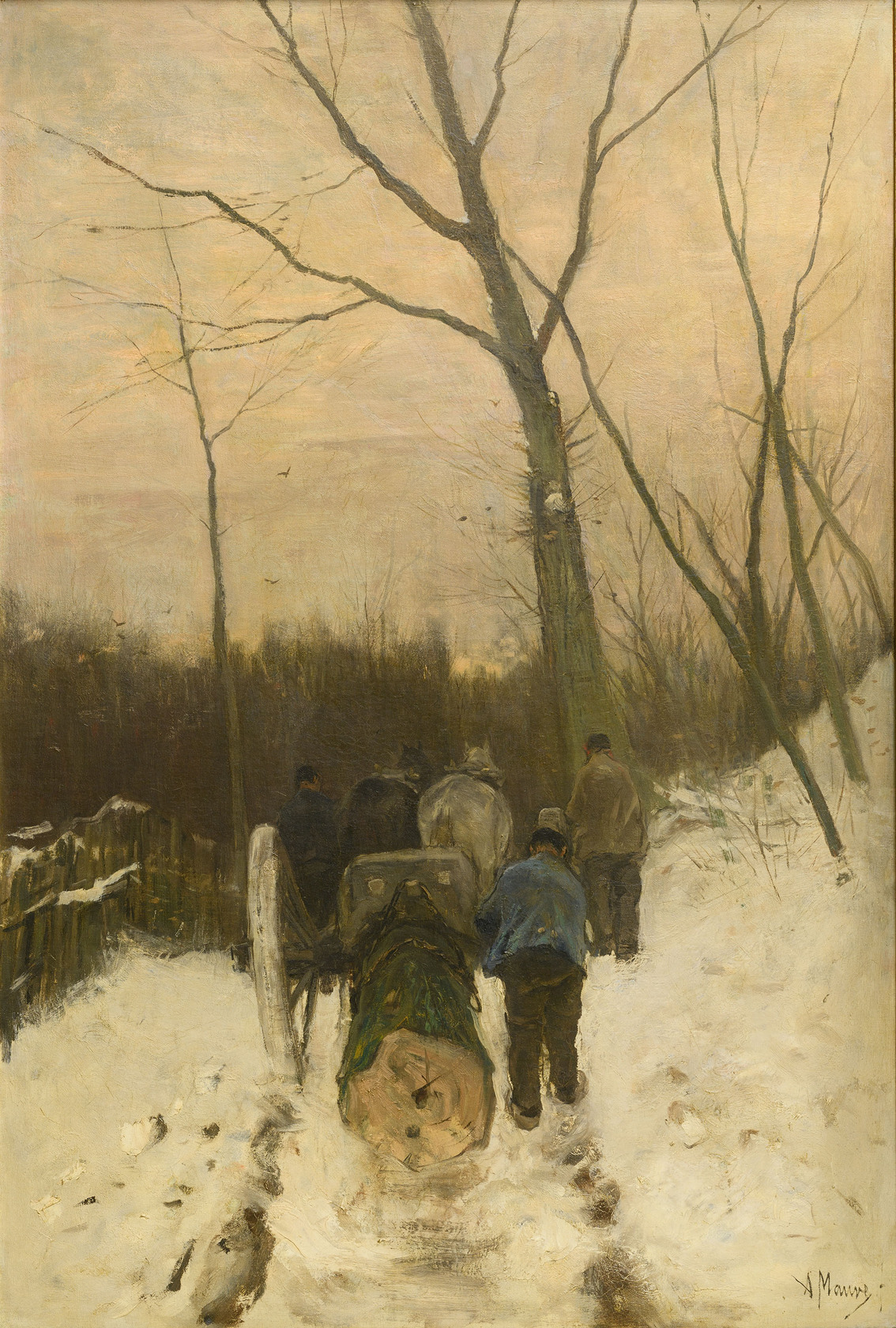
The Timber Truck (c. 1880), Carnegie Museum of Art

- Entering the Fold (c. 1885–8), drawing and watercolour, Tate Gallery
- Milking Time (c. 1875), oil on canvas, National Gallery
- The Timber Truck (c. 1880), oil on canvas, Carnegie Museum of Art, Pittsburgh.
- Landscape with cattle, chalk on paper, Courtauld Institute of Art
- Landscape with Cattle, oil on canvas, Museum of Fine Arts, Houston
- Shepherdess, oil on canvas, National Museum of Wales
- Morning Ride along the Beach (1876), oil on canvas, Rijksmuseum Amsterdam
- Riders in the Snow in the Haagse Bos (1879), watercolour and gouache, Rijksmuseum Amsterdam
- De Torenlaan te Laren (1886), oil on canvas, Rijksmuseum, Amsterdam
- Ariëtte Carbentus, wife of the artist, sitting in the dunes (c. 1876), oil on canvas, Rijksbureau voor Kunsthistorische Documentatie, The Hague (private collection)
- Gathering Seaweed, oil on canvas, Musée d'Orsay, Paris
- Changing Pasture (c. 1880s), oil on canvas, Metropolitan Museum of Art, New York
- The Return of the Flock, Laren (c. 1886 -1887), oil on canvas, Philadelphia Museum of Art, Philadelphia
- Digging up a Tree, watercolor, Museum of Fine Arts, Boston
- Returning Home, oil on wood, Art Gallery of New South Wales
- A Shepherdess and Her Flock, oil on canvas, Metropolitan Museum of Art

== Bibliography ==
- Dorn, Roland, Schröder, Klaus Albrecht & Sillevis, John, ed.: Van Gogh und die Haager Schule (exh. cat. Kunstforum, Wien 1996), Skira, Milan 1996 ISBN 88-8118-072-3
- Engel, E. P. "Anton Mauve". Academische Uitgeverij Haentjens Dekker & Gumbert, 1967 (University of Michigan)
- Naifeh, Steven; Smith, Gregory White. Van Gogh: The Life. Profile Books, 2011. ISBN 978-1-84668-010-6
- Tralbaut, Marc Edo. Vincent van Gogh, le mal aimé. Edita, Lausanne (French) & Macmillan, London 1969 (English); reissued by Macmillan, 1974 and by Alpine Fine Art Collections, 1981. ISBN 0-933516-31-2.

== See also ==
- The Letters of Vincent van Gogh
