= Sir John Nicholson, 2nd Baronet =

Sir John Norris Nicholson, 2nd Baronet, KBE, CIE, MA, JP (19 February 1911 – 30 August 1993) was Lord Lieutenant of the Isle of Wight from 1980 to 1985.

He was the only child of Captain George Crosfield Norris Nicholson, RFC, and Evelyn Izme née Murray, the daughter of Montolieu Oliphant-Murray, 1st Viscount Elibank. He was educated at Winchester College and Trinity College, Cambridge. In 1938 he married Vittoria Vivien née Trewhella: they had two sons and two daughters. During World War II he served with the Cheshire Regiment. From 1942 to 1946 he was seconded to the Ministry of War Transport.

== Notes ==
Baronetage of the United Kingdom
Preceded by Sir Charles Nicholson	Baronet of Harrington Gardens, Kensington; 1918–1993	Succeeded by Sir Charles Christian Nicholson
Honorary titles
Preceded by The Earl Mountbatten of Burma	Lord Lieutenant of the Isle of Wight; 1980–1985	Succeeded by The Lord Mottistone
