= Marian Allen =

English writer, poet, illustrator (1892–1953)

- Born: 18 January 1892; New South Wales, Australia
- Died: 12 September 1953; Oxford, England
- Occupation: Writer

Eleanor Marian Dundas Allen (18 January 1892 – 12 September 1953) was a British writer, the author of the poem now known as "The Wind on the Downs" published in a small 63-page book of poems of the same name. Allen was born at Toxteth Park (now St Scholastica's School), Glebe, Sydney, the daughter of George Boyce Allen, a barrister, and Isabella Dundas Allen.

== Life ==
Allen was born at Toxteth Park, the Sydney family estate of the Allen family who were prominent in the colony of New South Wales. The patriarch, George Allen, who had died in 1877, was himself the son of the physician of George III and had established the oldest law firm in Australia.

By 1908, the parents of Marian Allen with their family of six children (three boys and three girls) were living in Woodstock Road, Oxford, England.

It was here in 1913–14 that Marian first met Arthur Tylston Greg, whom she was to have married and to whom, under the initials A. T. G. her book of poems was dedicated. Like Marian Allen's brother, George Dundas Allen, Arthur Greg was studying Law at New College, Oxford and it seems likely that they first met when Arthur Greg visited his fellow student's house.

In August 1914, on the outbreak of World War I, Arthur Greg and Dundas (as Marian Allen's brother was known) abandoned their studies and joined the army. Arthur fought in the battles around the Hill 60 in Belgium and in May 1915 was badly wounded when part of his lower jaw was shot away. By 1916, Dundas Allen had joined the Royal Flying Corps and was awarded the Military Cross.

Arthur Greg also joined the Royal Flying Corps where, as Captain Greg, he trained to fly the D.H.4 bomber. He was shot down over St Quentin on St George's Day, 1917. He is buried at Jussy cemetery with an inscription chosen by the next-of-kin: "LOVE IS STRONGER THAN DEATH". Marian Allen heard the news on either 30 April or 1 May, and some of her finest poems, many of them sonnets, were written almost immediately afterward. "To A. T. G." was finished on 2 May, and "I like to think of you..." on 10 May.

In the 1920s, and 1930s, Marian Allen became a successful author/illustrator of children's books such as The Wind in the Chimney, Joy Street volumes etc., writing mainly for Blackwell. She also designed the dust wrappers for numbers 5 to 11 of the Joy Street volumes. During much of this time she was living in London with her family at 35 Harrington Gardens (now the London base of Ithaca College).

Later in life, she returned to Woodstock Road in Oxford where she died unmarried on 12 September 1953.

== Quotation ==
"But when the road is passed, the hilltop won,

We'll tell each other everything we've done."
