= The Bentley London =

Luxury hotel in London, England

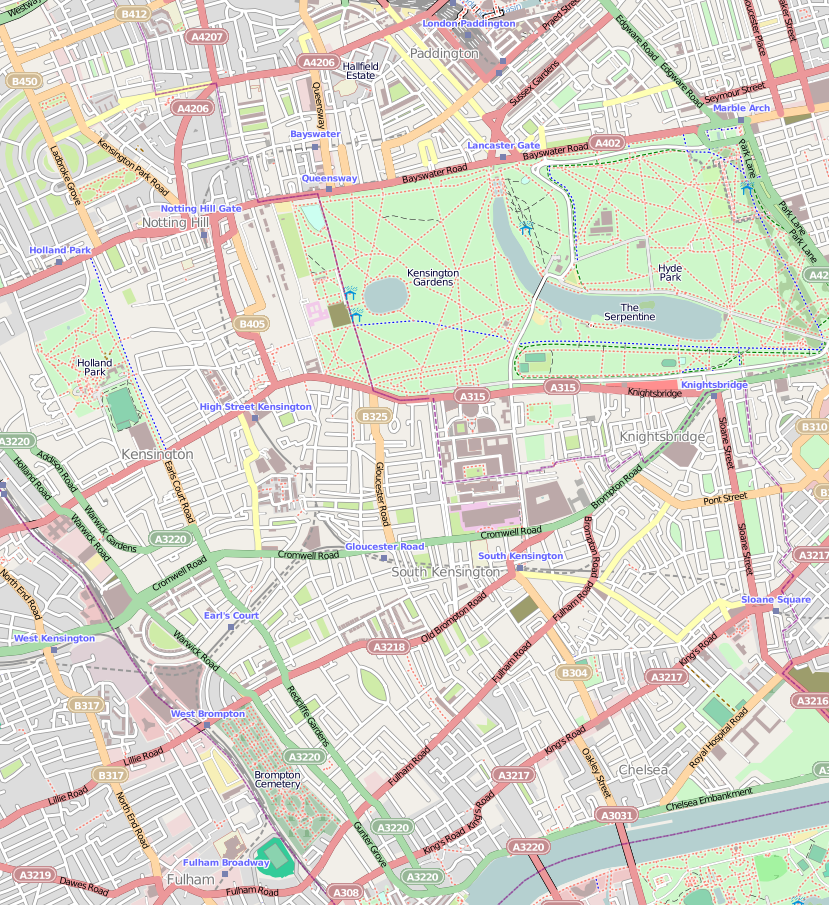
- Location within Kensington

General information
- Location: 27–33 Harrington Gardens, Kensington, London, England, United Kingdom
- Coordinates: 51°29′34.08″N 0°11′3.12″W

Other information
- Number of rooms: 64
- Number of restaurants: 1

Website
- Official site

The Bentley London is a luxury hotel in London, England, located in South Kensington. The hotel contains 64 rooms. The building was constructed in 1880, joined the Hilton Group as a franchise in October 2008 and was added to the Waldorf-Astoria collection on 12 March 2009. As of January 2012, The Bentley Hotel is a standalone hotel with no association with Hilton or Waldorf Astoria.

== Architecture ==
The Bentley London is built from 600 tonnes of marble imported from Turkey, Italy and Northern Africa. It was constructed behind the façade of three adjacent Georgian townhouses.

== Gallery ==
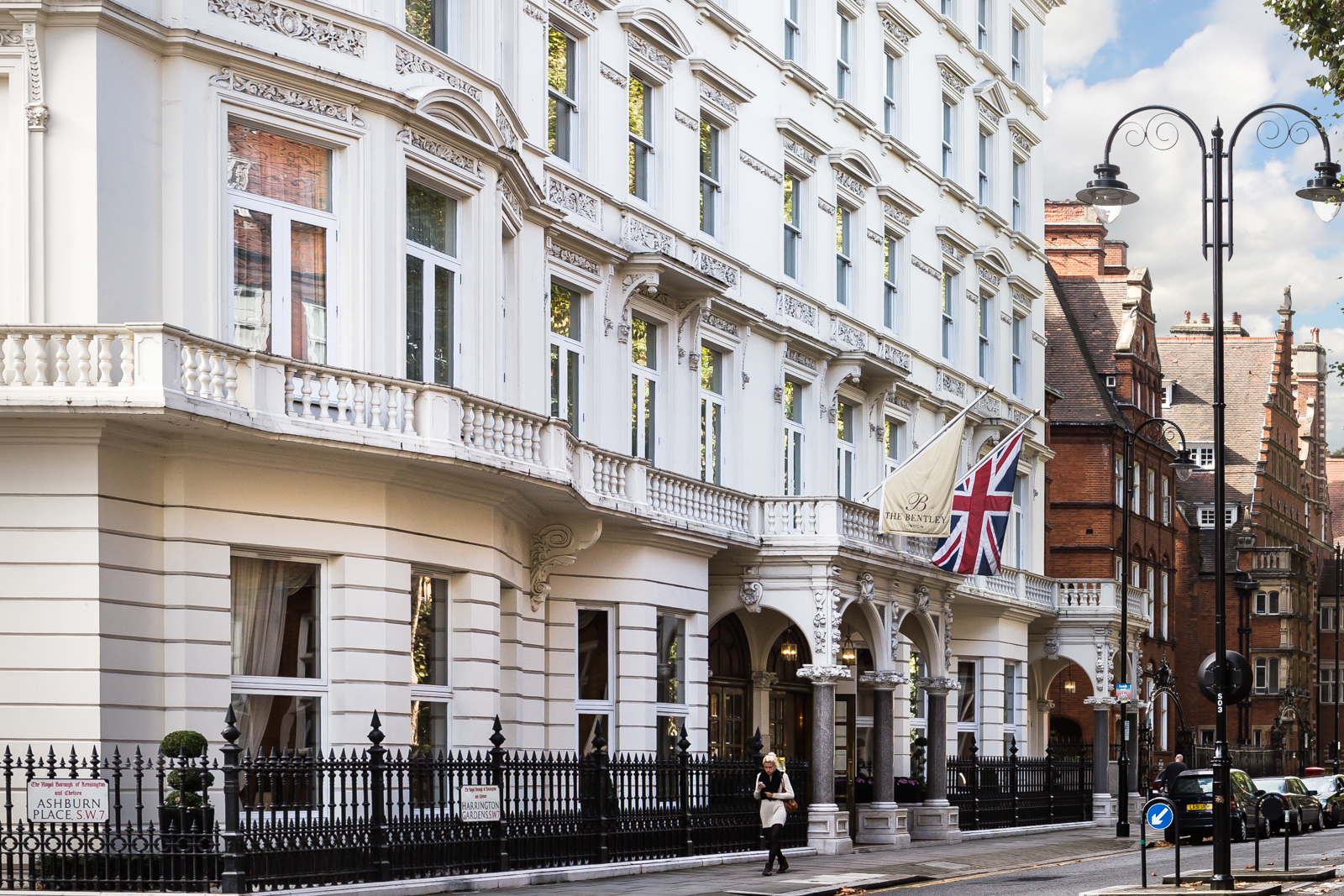
Hotel exterior

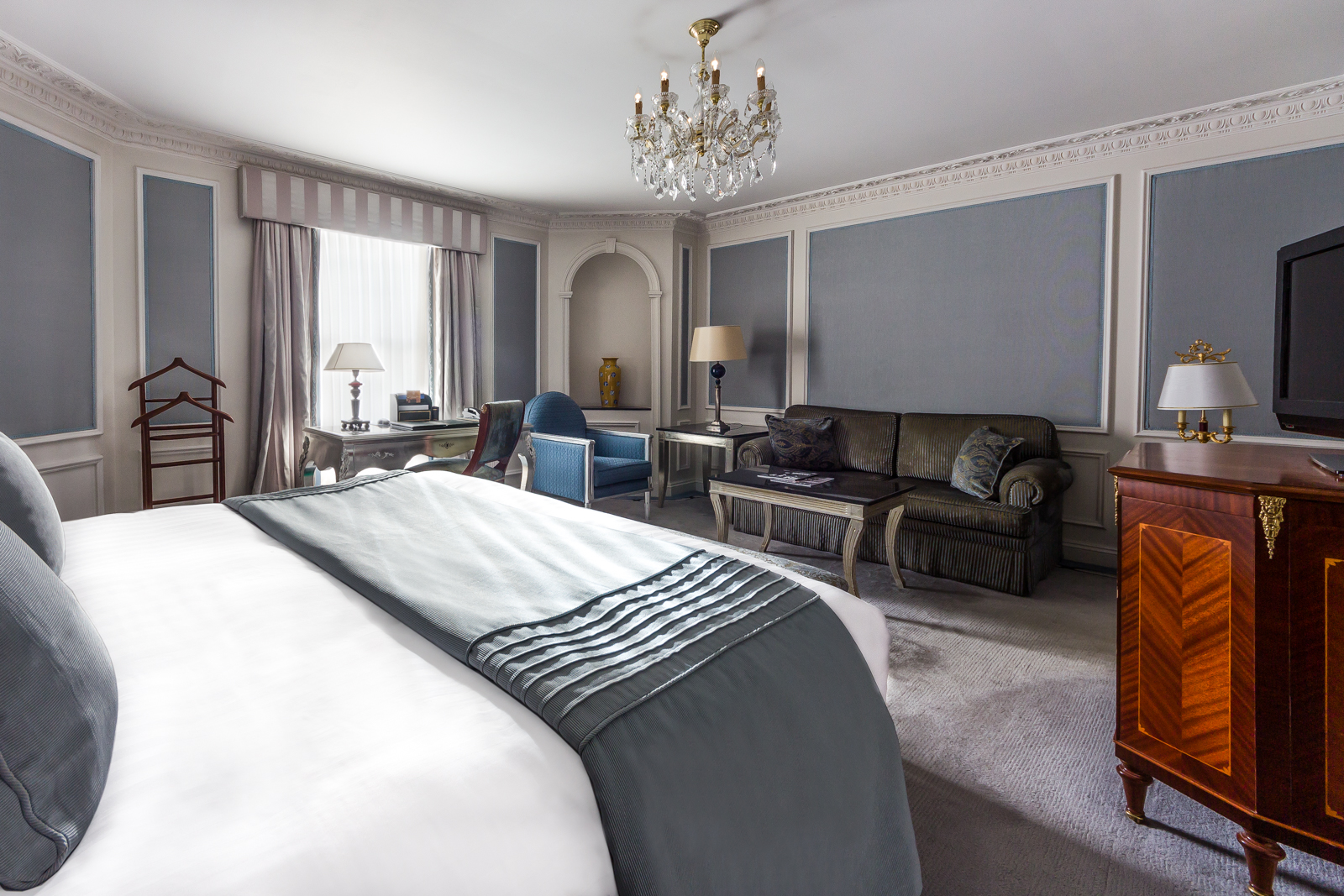
Bedroom

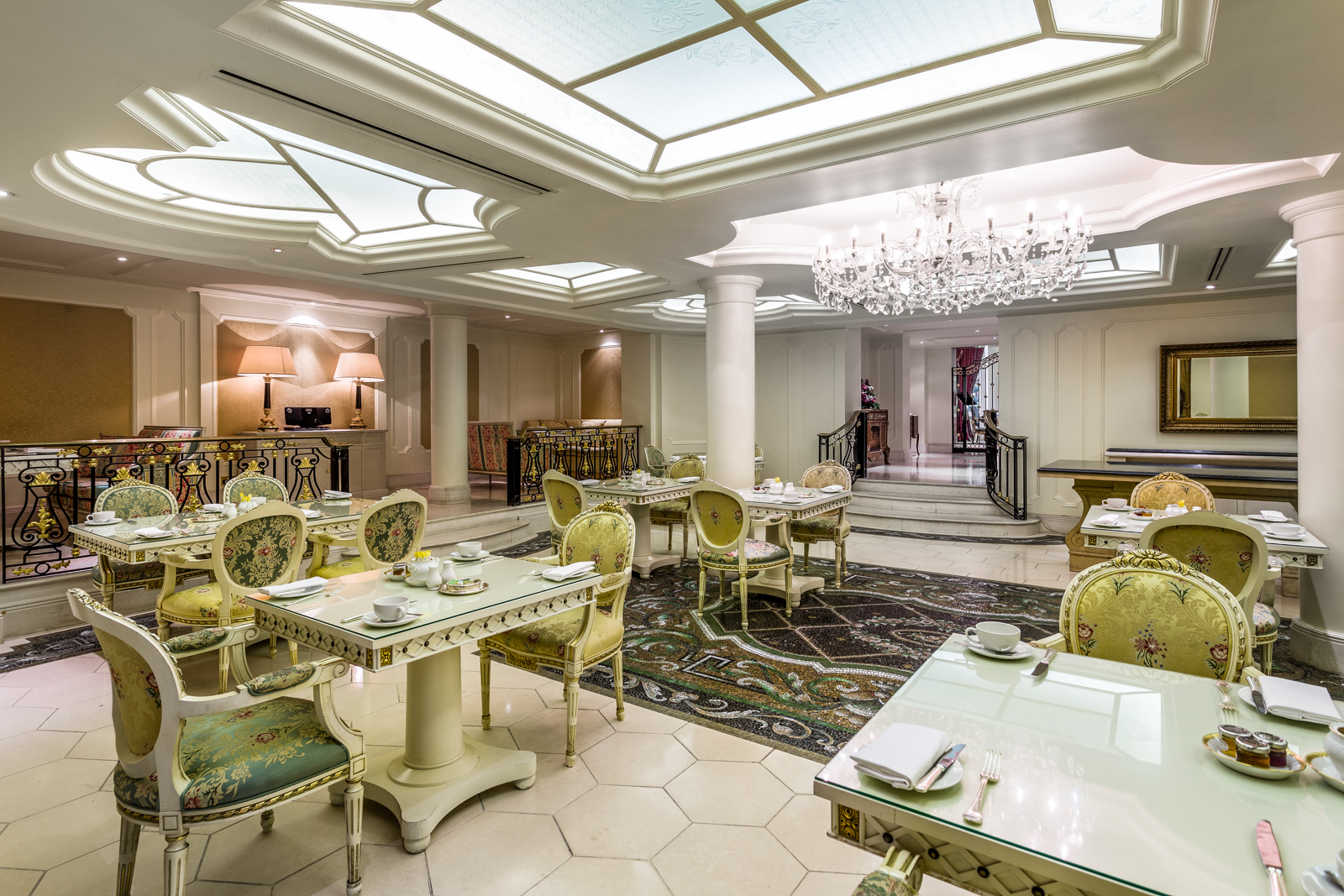
Restaurant
