= Wouterus Verschuur =

Dutch painter

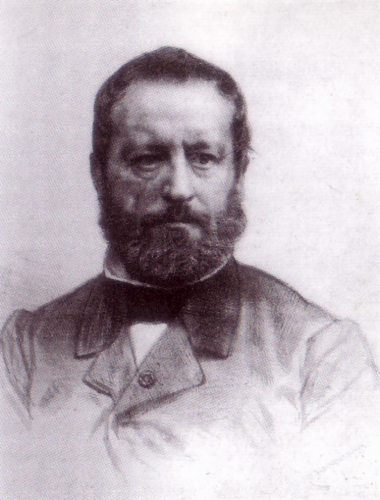
- Portrait, undated
- Born: Wouterus Verschuur; 11 June 1812; Amsterdam
- Died: 4 July 1874 (aged 62); Vorden
- Known for: Painting

Wouterus Verschuur (11 June 1812 – 4 July 1874) was a Dutch painter of animal subjects – mainly horses – and of landscapes. He is one of the later representatives of Romanticism in Dutch art.

== Life and career ==
Born to an Amsterdam jeweller, Verschuur received his training from the landscape and cattle painters Pieter Gerardus van Os and Cornelis Steffelaar. As part of this education Verschuur had to copy works by the 17th century painter Philips Wouwerman, like Wouwerman Verschuur’s subjects consist mostly of stable scenes, landscapes with horses and coastal landscapes.

Showing talent from an early age, at 15 Verschuur had a painting exhibited at the “Exhibition of Living Masters” at Amsterdam in 1828. In 1832 and 1833 he won the gold medal at the annual exhibition at Felix Meritis. In 1833 he was appointed a member of the Royal Academy in Amsterdam. In 1839 he joined the artists’ society, Arti et Amicitiae. His reputation was also considerable abroad. He was often featured in the annual exhibitions which travelled the large European cities at that time. In 1855 Napoleon III purchased one of his paintings at the Exposition Universelle in Paris.

The popularity of his paintings provided him with sufficient funds to travel widely. He made frequent trips to Gelderland and Brabant and abroad to Switzerland and Germany. In 1874, on one of his trips to Gelderland, he died on 4 July in the town of Vorden. He left behind an oeuvre of about four hundred paintings and over two thousand drawings. Amongst his students were his son, Wouterus Verschuur Jr. and Anton Mauve.

'A grey and a black horse with stable boys', a 69x59 cm oil on panel was sold at Christie's Amsterdam in 1998 for $451,165.

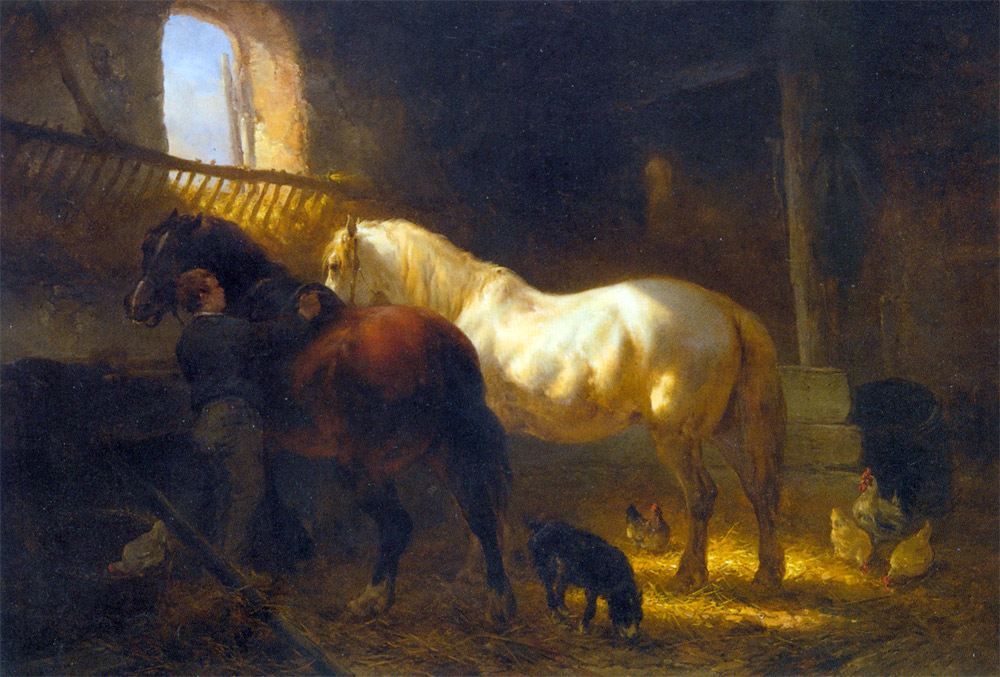
Horses in a stable

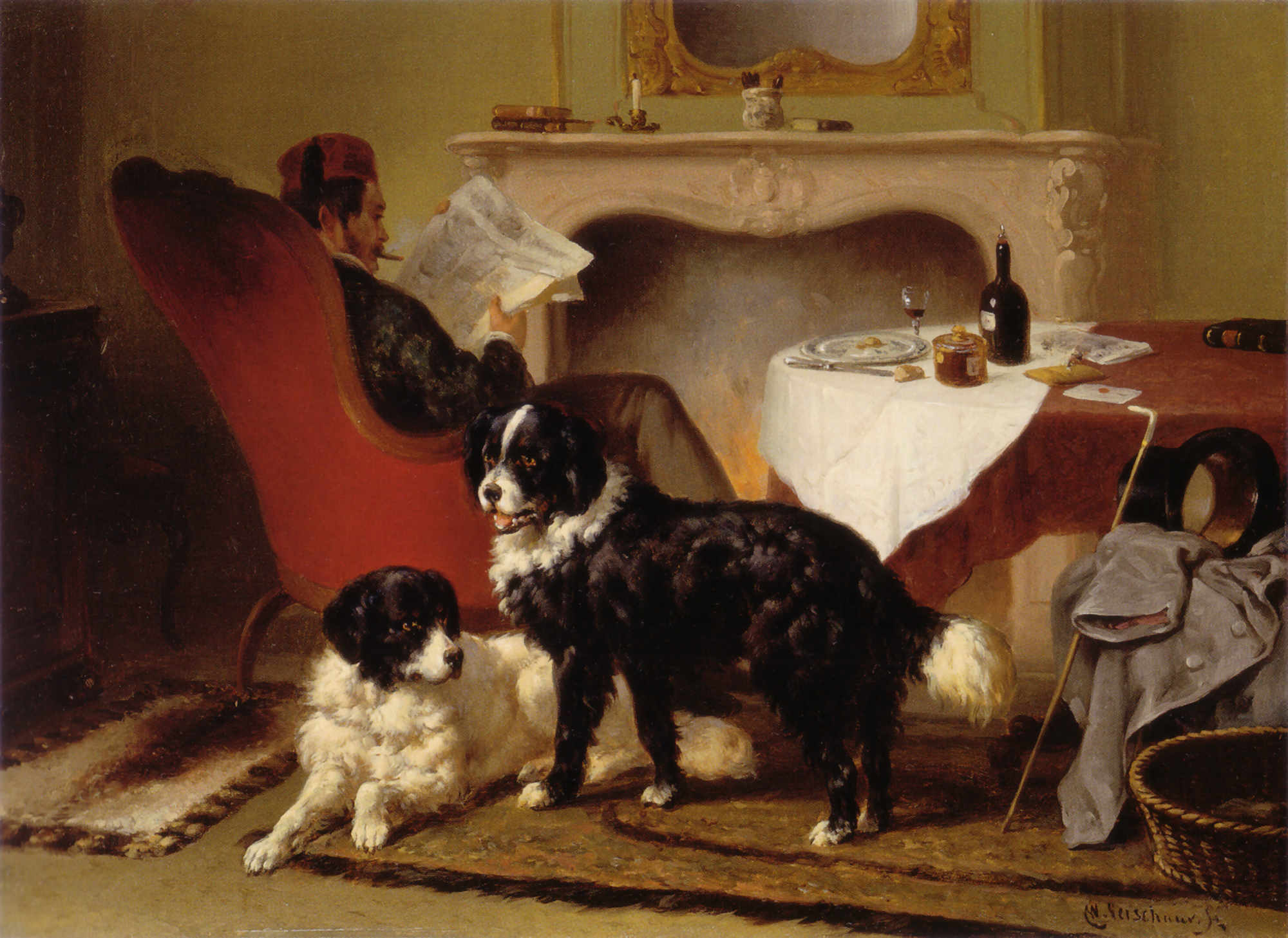
Reading man and two dogs

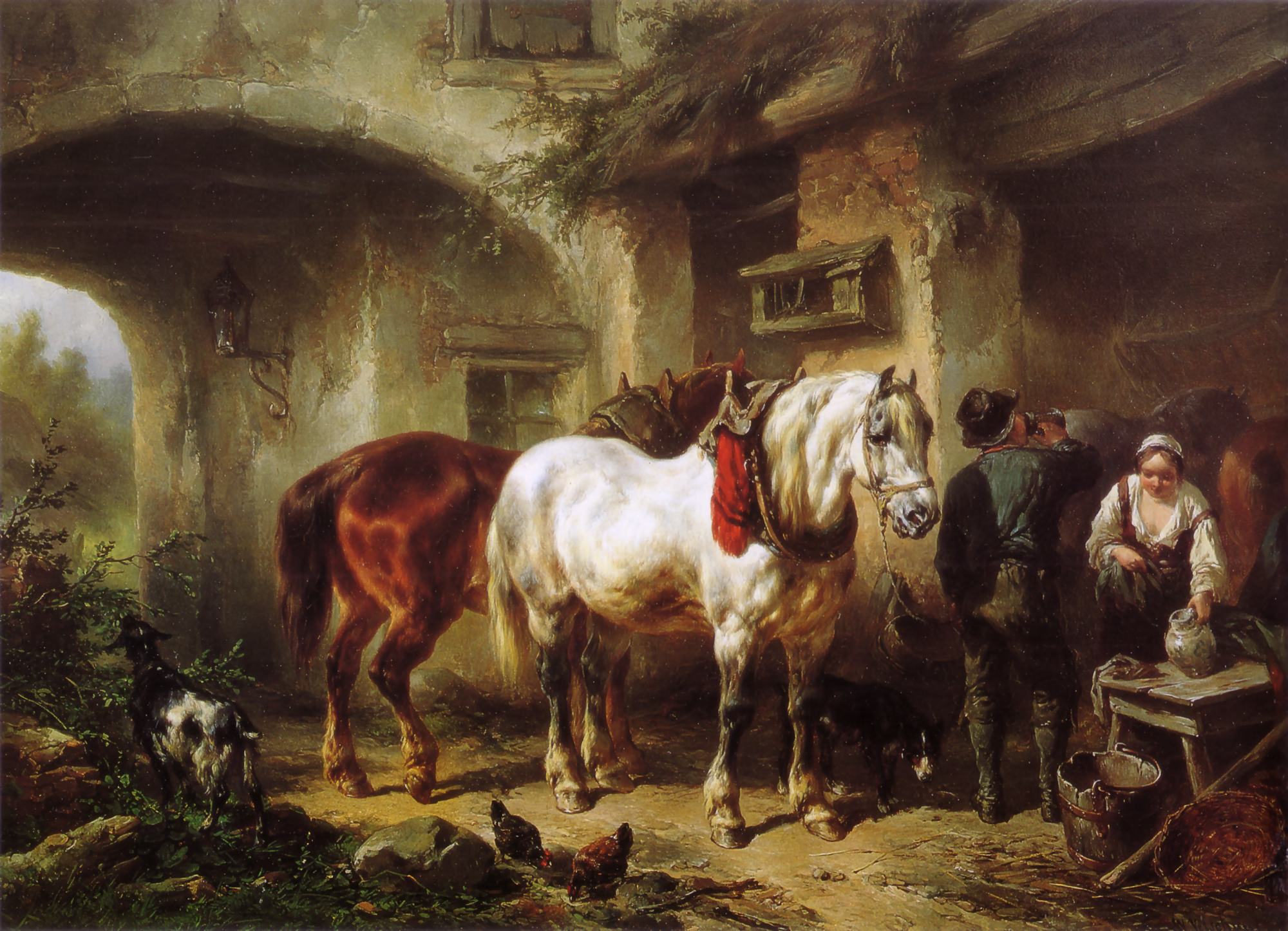
Horses and people
in a courtyard

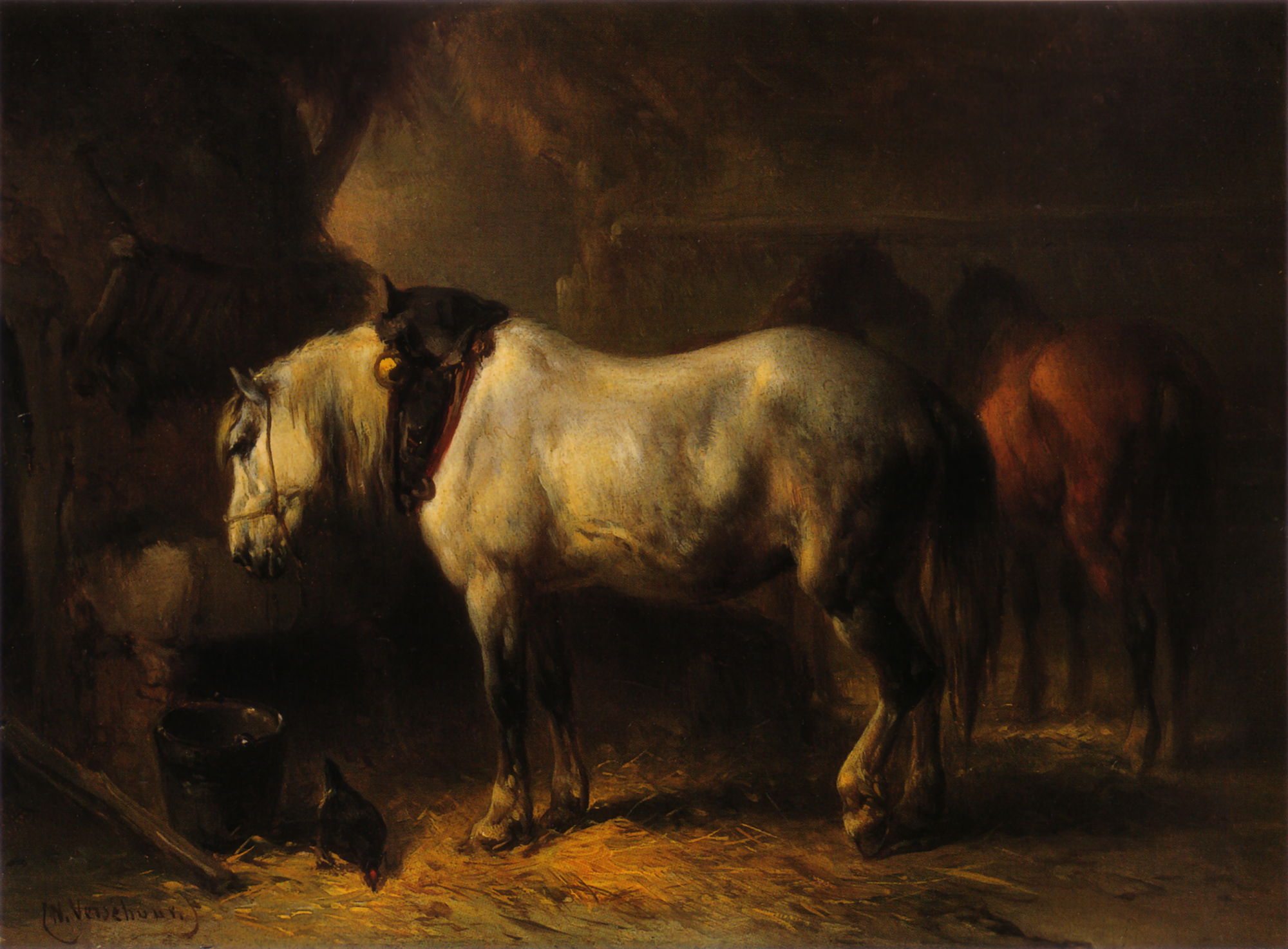
In the stables

== Bibliography ==
- Woldring, Josephine; Laanstra, Willem (2001), Hollandse Romantiek (in Dutch), De Doelenpers, ISBN 90-70655-32-2
- Van Heteren, Marjan; Jansen, Guido; De Leeuw, Ronald (2000), Poëzie der Werkelijkheid (in Dutch), Waanders Uitgevers, ISBN 90-400-9419-5
