= Sir Charles Nicholson, 1st Baronet, of Harrington Gardens =

British politician (1857–1918)

Sir Charles Nicholson
- Charles Nicholson, circa 1910

Member of Parliament for Doncaster
- In office 8 February 1906 – 29 November 1918
- Preceded by: Frederick Fison
- Succeeded by: Reginald Nicholson

Personal details
- Born: Charles Norris Nicholson; 30 July 1857
- Died: 29 November 1918 (aged 61)
- Party: Liberal
- Other political affiliations: Coalition Liberal
- Spouse: Amy Crosfield
- Parents: William Nicholson (father); Emily Daniel (mother)
- Relatives: Reginald Nicholson (brother)
- Education: Charterhouse School
- Alma mater: Trinity College, Cambridge

Sir Charles Norris Nicholson, 1st Baronet (30 July 1857 – 29 November 1918) was the Liberal Member of Parliament for Doncaster from 1906 to 1918.

== Early life and career ==
He was born in 1857 a son of William Norris Nicholson and Emily Daniel, daughter of James Stock Daniel. His father was Secretary to two Liberal Lord Chancellors, Lord Truro and Lord Cranworth, and Master in Lunacy. He was educated at Charterhouse and Trinity College, Cambridge, In 1882 he married Amy Letitia Crosfield of Warrington. He had a younger brother Reginald, who also went on to become a Liberal MP. The Nicholson Baronetcy, of Harrington Gardens in the Royal Borough of Kensington, was created in the Baronetage of the United Kingdom on 7 February 1912.

== Professional career ==
He undertook legal training and in 1878 he received a Call to Bar and in 1880 joined Lincoln's Inn. He chose not to practise and instead worked in the Lunacy Office. He worked in Shoreditch, London for 15 years during which he served as Chairman of Shoreditch Board of Guardians. He was also Chairman of Shoreditch Poor Law Schools Committee. In 1910 he was appointed Second Church Estates Commissioner.

== Political career ==
In 1902 Nicholson was selected as Liberal candidate for Doncaster. It was a marginal Conservative seat that the Liberals last won in 1892, the last time they formed the government. In 1906, with the country swinging behind the new government of Sir Henry Campbell-Bannerman, Nicholson comfortably gained Doncaster.

Nicholson faced re-election in January 1910 and was comfortably re-elected, retaining most of the vote he had gained in 1906. This comfortable result was confirmed at the December 1910 General Election.

Nicholson was a supporter of votes for women, backing it in notable House of Commons votes in 1908 and 1912. Following the Asquith-Lloyd George split in the Liberal party, Nicholson backed Lloyd George, remaining loyal to the Coalition Government.

== Personal life and death ==
Nicholson was a Fellow of the Royal Statistical Society, a member of the Royal Institute, Chairman of the Board of Control of Regt. Institutes and a Fellow of the Royal Horticultural Society. In November 1918, at the age of 61, at the start of the general election campaign, he died suddenly from pneumonia. He was replaced as Liberal candidate by his younger brother Reginald Nicholson, who was elected comfortably with the backing of the Coalition government.

Parliament of the United Kingdom
Preceded by Frederick Fison	Member of Parliament for Doncaster; 1906–1918	Succeeded by Reginald Nicholson
Church of England titles
Preceded by James Tomkinson	Second Church Estates Commissioner; 1910–1918	Succeeded by Sir William Mount
Baronetage of the United Kingdom
New creation	Baronet (of Harrington Gardens); 1912–1918	Succeeded by John Nicholson
