= Harrington Gardens =

Street in South Kensington, London

Coordinates: 51°29′33.62″N 0°11′8.63″W

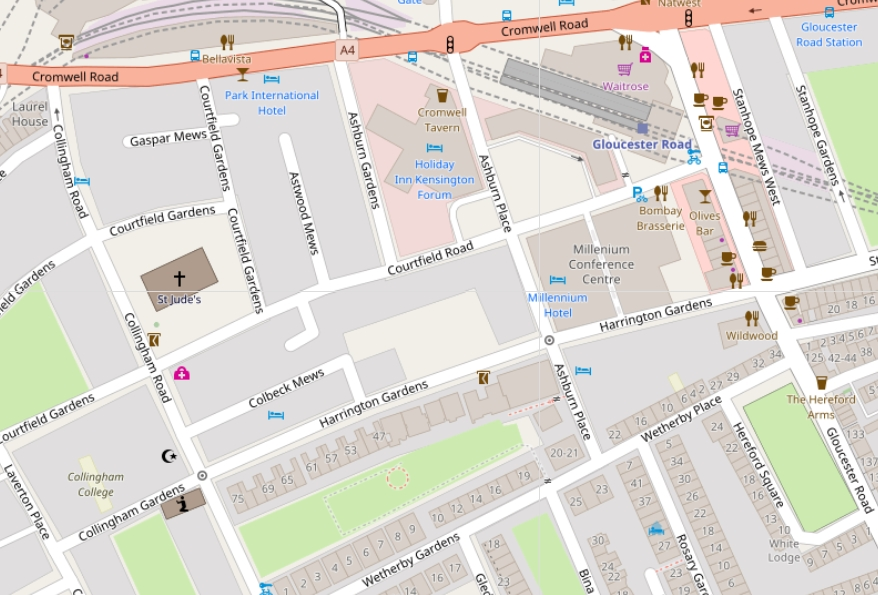
Map of the Harrington Gardens area

Harrington Gardens is a street which has a garden square in the Royal Borough of Kensington and Chelsea in London. The street runs from Collingham Gardens and Collingham Road in the east to Gloucester Road and Stanhope Gardens in the west. It is crossed by Ashburn Place and joined by Colbeck Mews on its north side. It contains several listed buildings including an important group of grade II* buildings on the south side numbered 35 to 45 (odd numbers only).

In March 1954, Kenneth Gilbert (22) and Ian Grant (24), porters at the Aban Court Hotel at no 25, killed their colleague 55-year old night porter George Smart, and on 17 June 1954, they became the UK's last side-by-side execution when they were hanged at HM Prison Pentonville. After a long era in which double hangings were normal for partners in crime, the Homicide Act 1957 ended the practice, making hangings simultaneous, but at separate prisons. Until early November 1959, the American poet Theodore Roethke lived at the Alwin Court Hotel in nearby Gloucester Road and then the Aban Court Hotel, but "did not like the accommodations at either one".

== Facilities ==
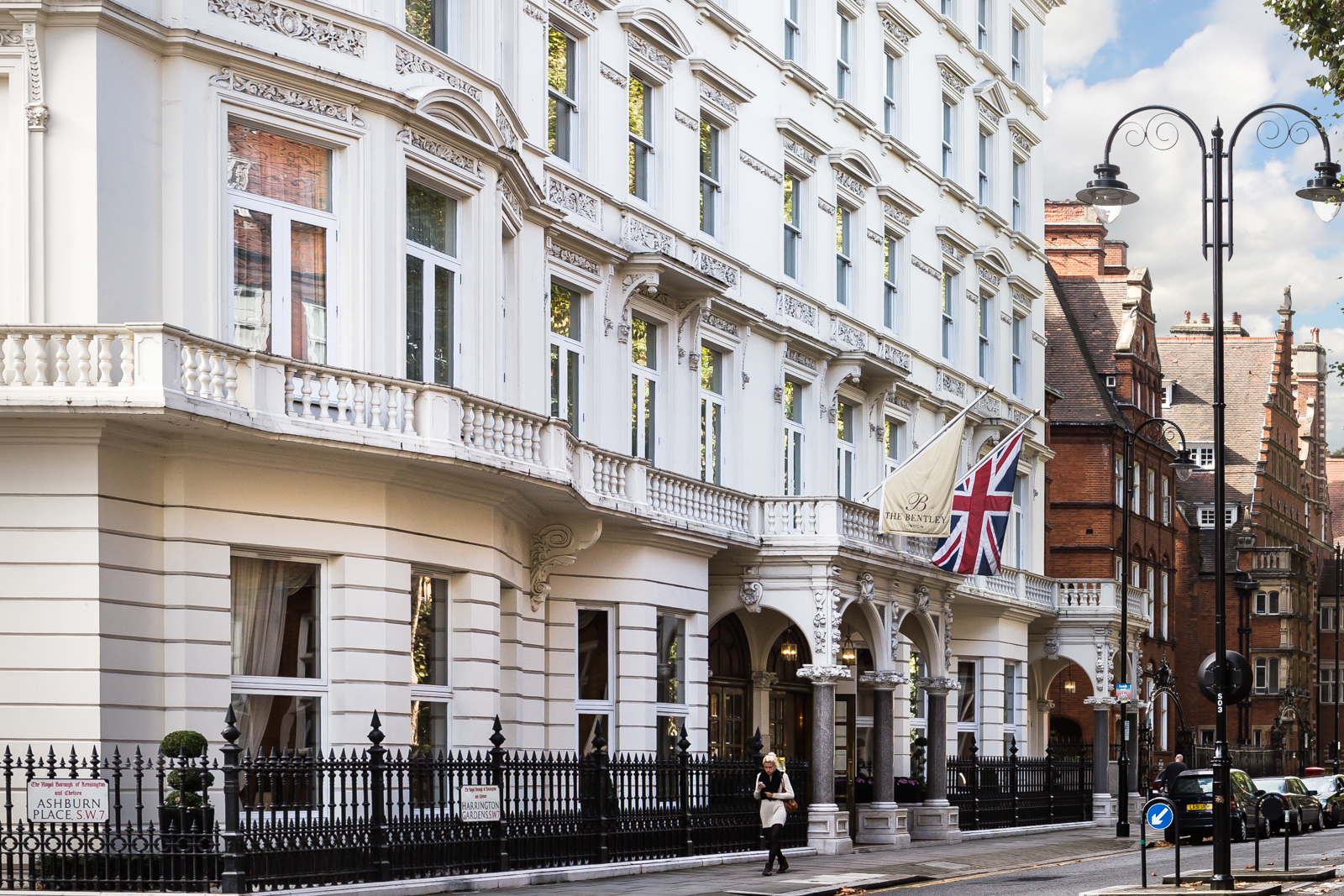
Bentley Hotel

The Avni Kensington Hotel and the Millennium Gloucester London hotel and Grosvenor Casino are on the north side of the street. The Bentley Hotel is on the south side.

The small Gloucester Park is midway along the street on the north side.

== Listed buildings ==
- Numbers 1 and 3 on the south side are grade II listed.
- The entrance arch and flanking pavilions to Bailey's Hotel on the north side are grade II listed.
- The pair of K6 telephone kiosks on the north side on the corner with Gloucester Road are grade II listed.
- Numbers 20 and 22, and numbers 24 and 26, on the north side are grade II listed.
- Numbers 35 to 45 inclusive (odds only) on the south side are all grade II* listed.
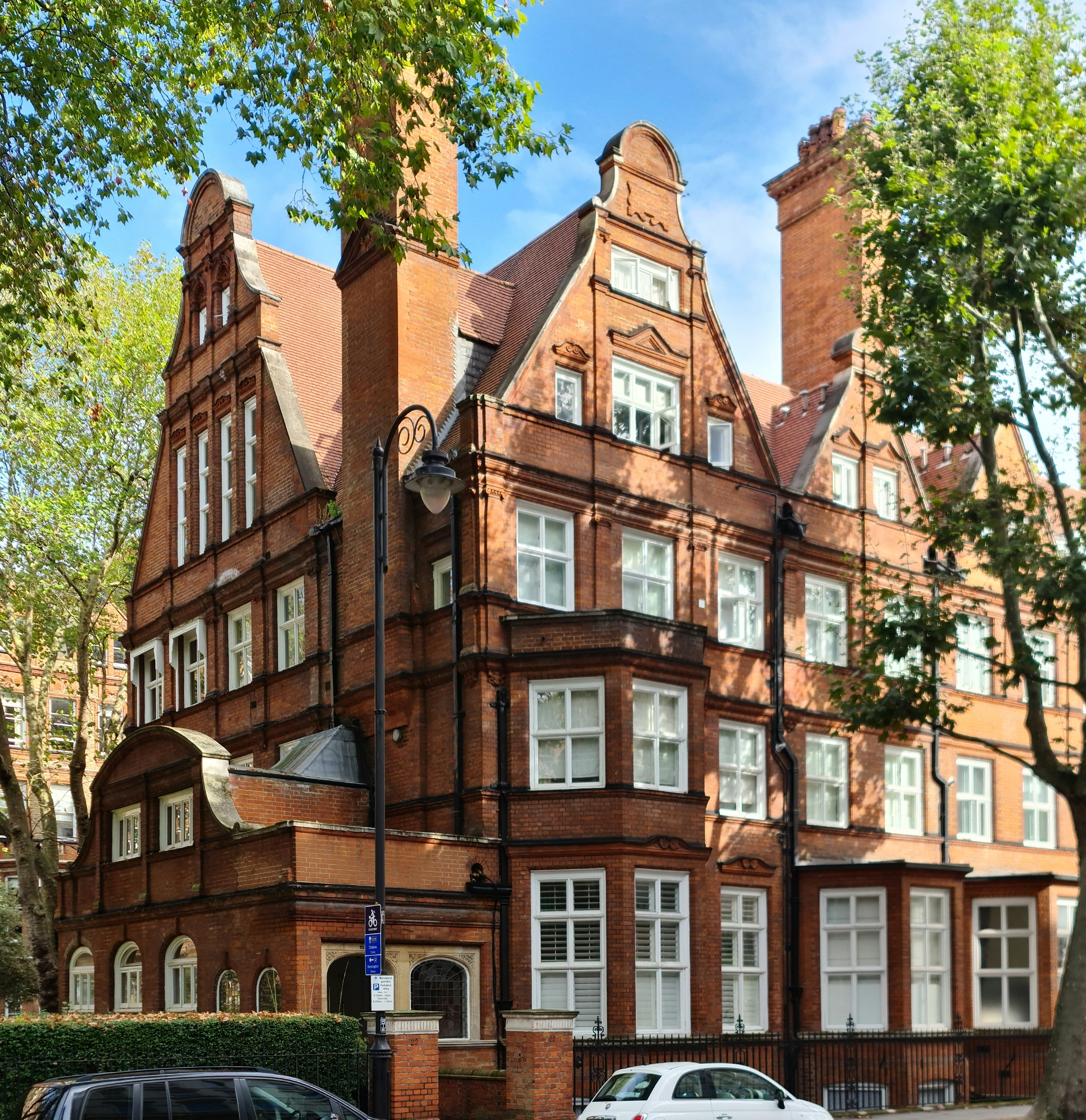
Nos. 20 and 22

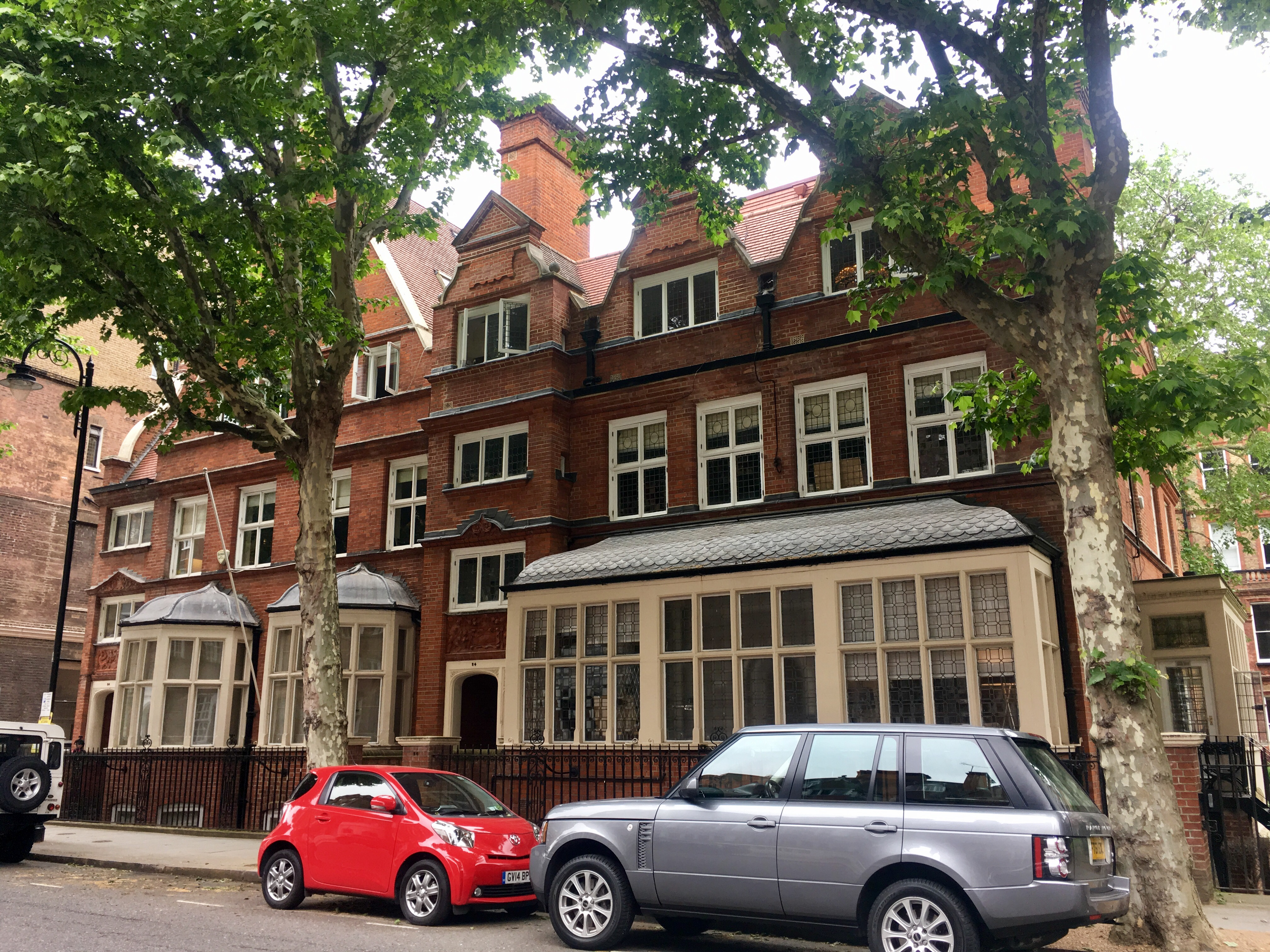
Nos. 24 and 26

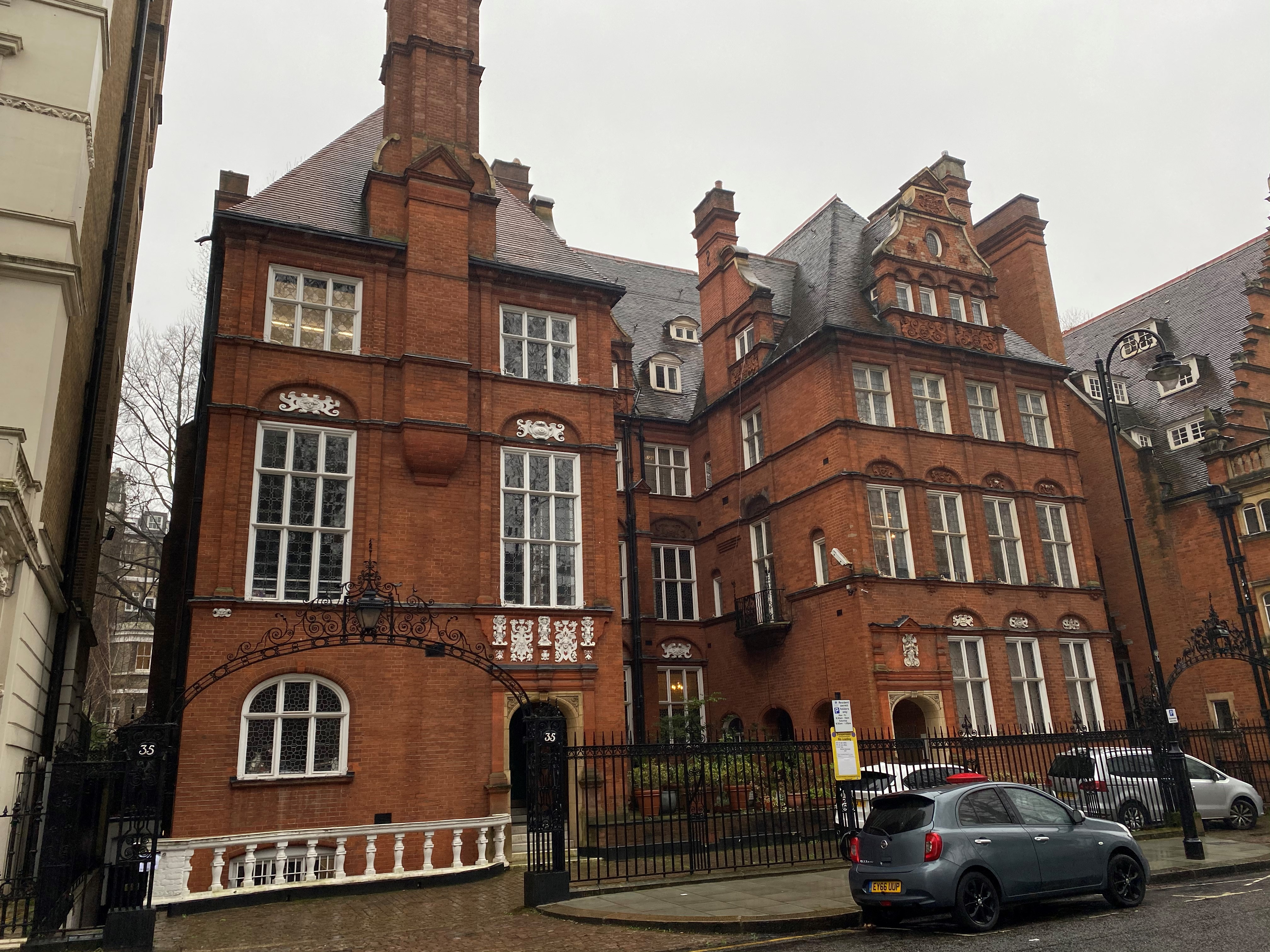
Nos. 35 and 37

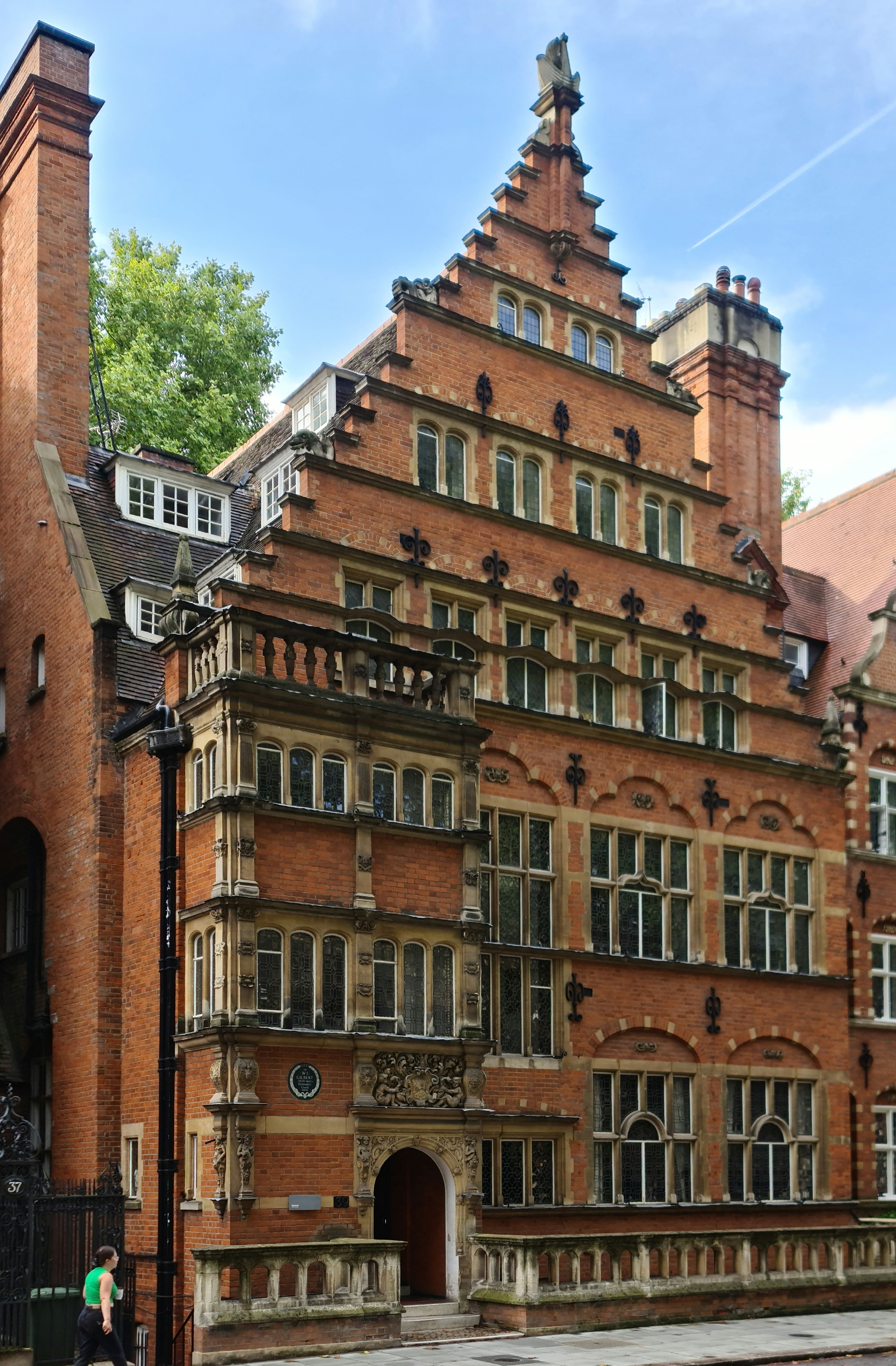
No. 39

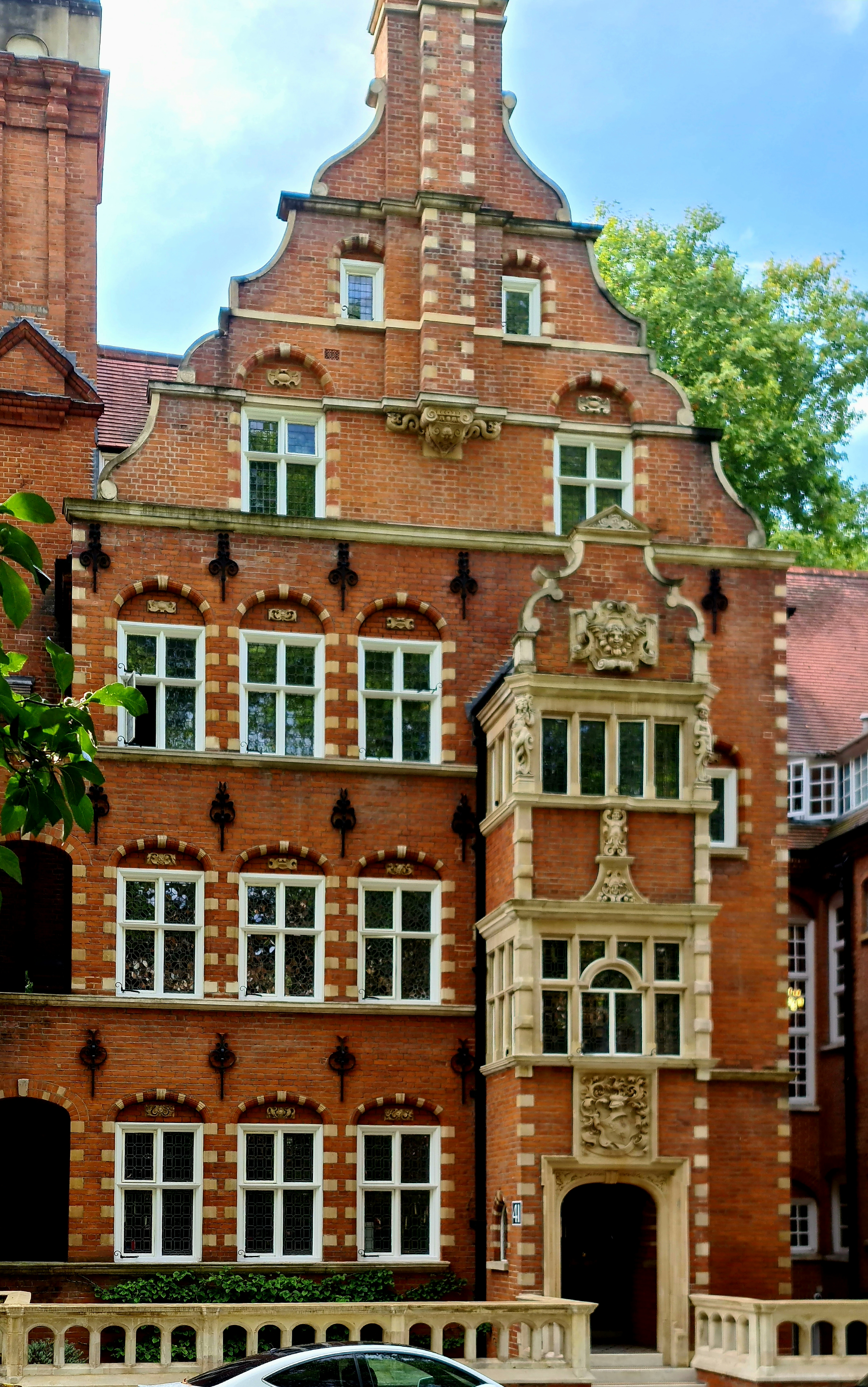
No. 41

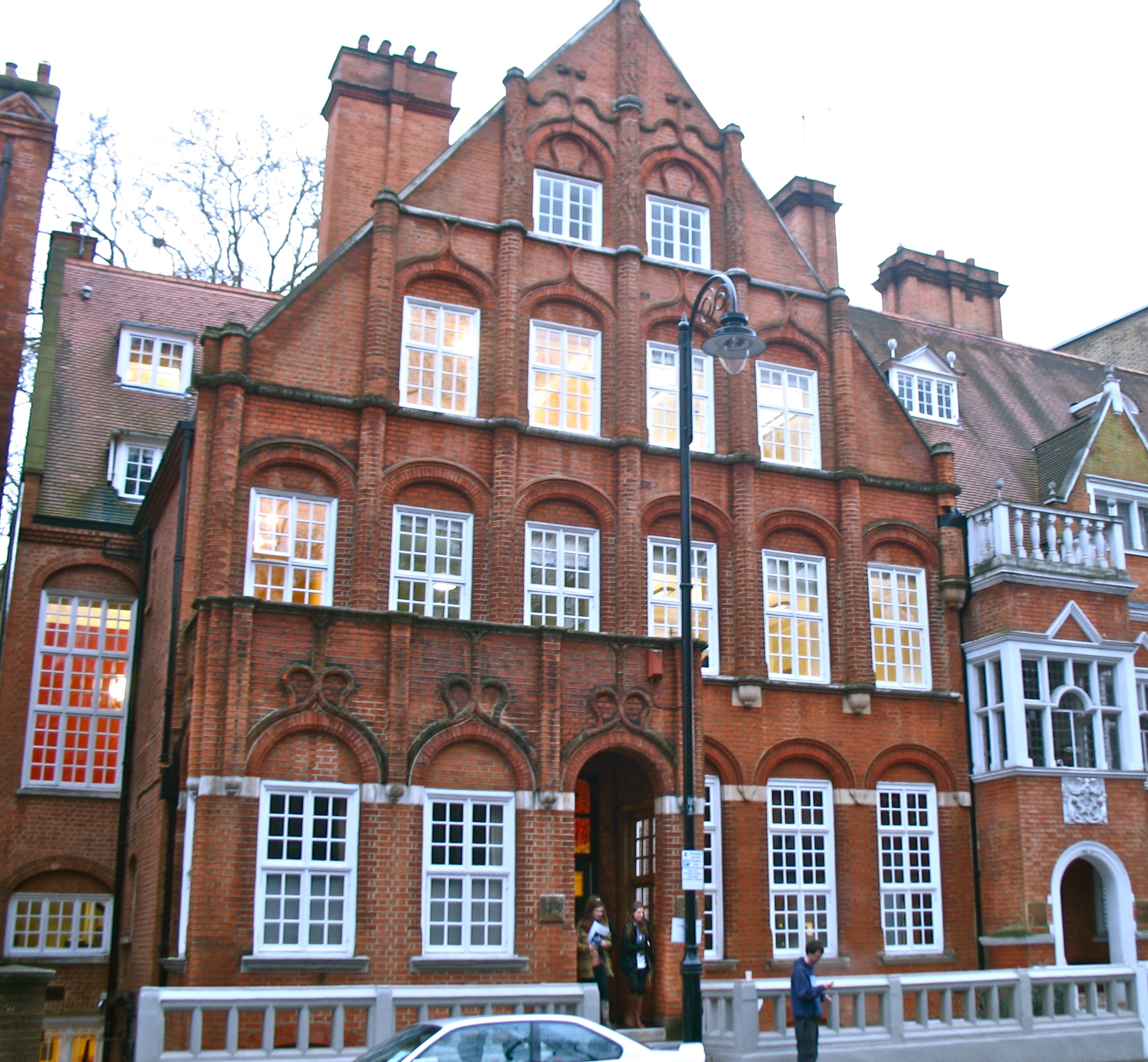
No. 43

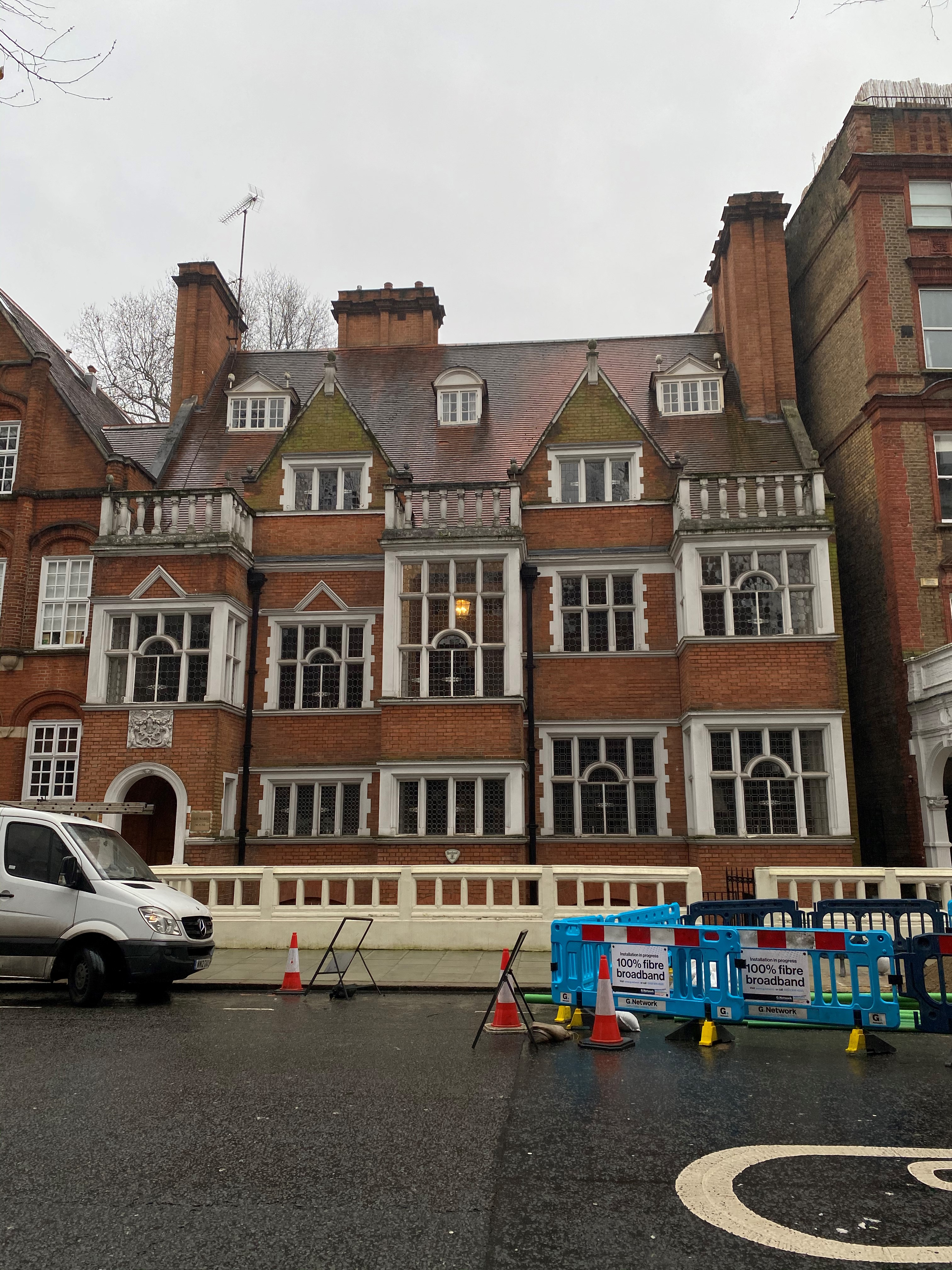
No. 45

== Notable people ==
- Nicholas Freeman
- Ronald Tree
- Marian Allen
- Sir Charles Nicholson, 1st Baronet, of Harrington Gardens
- James Bailey (British politician)
- Annie Russell Merrylees
- Gertrude Leverkus
- E. Beresford Chancellor
