= Nicholson baronets =

Set index for Nicholson baronets

There have been three baronetcies created for persons with the surname Nicholson, all in the Baronetage of the United Kingdom. As of 2026 one title is extant.

- Nicholson baronets of Luddenham (1859)
- Nicholson baronets of Harrington Gardens (1912)
- Nicholson baronets of Winterbourne (1958): see Sir Godfrey Nicholson, 1st Baronet (1901–1991)

== See also ==
- Nicolson baronets
