= Reginald Nicholson =

British politician

Member of Parliament for Doncaster
- In office 14 December 1918 – 15 November 1922
- Preceded by: Charles Nicholson
- Succeeded by: Wilfred Paling

Personal details
- Born: Reginald Nicholson; 15 July 1869
- Died: 27 April 1946 (aged 76)
- Party: National Liberal
- Other political affiliations: Coalition Liberal
- Spouse: Natalie Pearson
- Children: 2
- Parents: William Nicholson (father); Emily Daniel (mother)
- Relatives: Charles Nicholson (brother)
- Education: Charterhouse School

Reginald Nicholson (15 July 1869 – 27 April 1946) was an English Liberal Party politician.

== Early life and career ==
Nicholson was the son of the William Norris Nicholson and his wife Emily (née Daniel). He was educated at Charterhouse, and later became Traffic Manager of the Bengal-Nagpur Railway. He was Manager of The Times newspaper from 1911 to 1915. On 15 February 1915, he married Natalie Stark Pearson (1889–1956), daughter of Frederick Stark Pearson. They had two sons, David Benevenuto Nicholson (1916–1937) and Peter Anthony Nicholson (1923–2001).

== Professional career ==
He was elected at the 1918 general election as a Coalition Liberal Member of Parliament (MP) for Doncaster in the West Riding of Yorkshire. He was Parliamentary Private Secretary to the Under-Secretary of State for Air from 1919 to 1920, but was defeated at the 1922 general election by the Labour Party candidate Wilfred Paling, and did not stand again.

Parliament of the United Kingdom
Preceded by Sir Charles Nicholson, Bt	Member of Parliament for Doncaster; 1918–1922	Succeeded by Wilfred Paling
