= Frederick Fison =

British politician

Fison in 1895

Sir Frederick William Fison, 1st Baronet (4 December 1847 – 20 December 1927) was an English mill-owner and Conservative politician who sat in the House of Commons from 1895 to 1906.

Fison was born at Bradford, the son of William Fison a manufacturer and his wife Fanny Whitaker. He was educated at Rugby School and Christ Church, Oxford. He was a spinner and manufacturer and became a justice of the peace (J.P.) and deputy lieutenant.

At the 1885 general election, Fison stood unsuccessfully for Parliament in Otley and he was unsuccessful again in Buckrose in 1892. He finally entered the Commons at the 1895 general election, when he was elected as member of parliament for Doncaster, holding that seat until his defeat at the 1906 general election. He was created a baronet on 27 July 1905.

Fison died at the age of 80.

Fison married Isabella Crossley, daughter of Joseph Crossley, on 23 April 1872. Their son William Fison was an Olympic rower.

Coat of arms of Frederick Fison
Crest A demi heraldic tiger rampant Or collared Gules holding between the paws and escutcheon Argent charged with a battle-axe Sable. Escutcheon Per fess Azure and Ermine in chief three battle-axes erect Or and in base an heraldic tiger passant of the third. Motto Deo Confide

Parliament of the United Kingdom
Preceded by Charles James Fleming	Member of Parliament for Doncaster; 1895–1906	Succeeded by Charles Norris Nicholson
Baronetage of the United Kingdom
New creation	Baronet (of Greenholme in Burley-in-Wharfedale); 1905– 1927	Succeeded by Francis Geoffrey Fison
