= Robert McGregor (painter) =

Scottish landscape painter, genre painter, portrait painter and marine painter

- Born: Robert McGregor; 1847; Bradford, Yorkshire, England
- Died: 1922 (aged 74–75); Edinburgh, Scotland
- Known for: Painter

Robert McGregor RSA (1847–1922) was a Scottish landscape painter, genre painter, portrait painter and marine painter. His genre was particularly painting working men such as fishermen, shepherds, crofters, pedlars, and farm labourers. However he also painted Scottish, French and Dutch country and coastal scenery. He usually signed his work in the right hand bottom corner.

== Biography ==
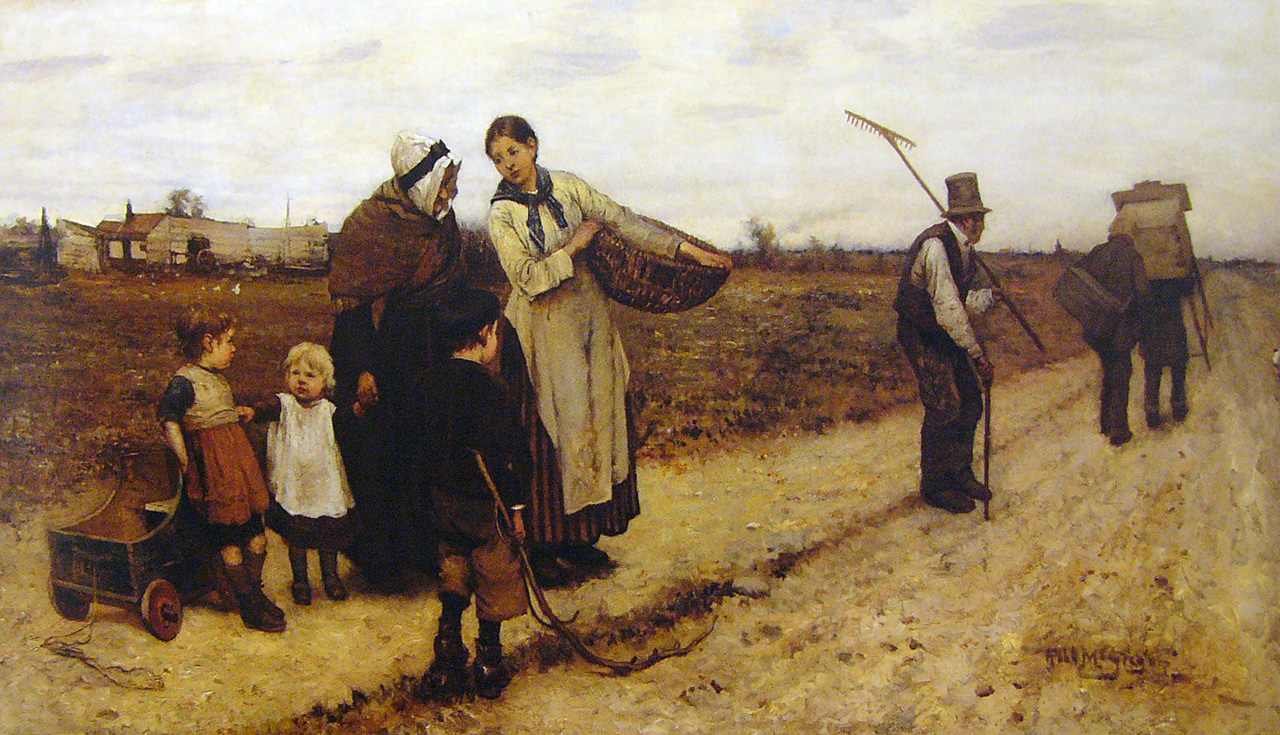
Doing the Provinces by Robert McGregor. 1879

Robert McGregor (MacGregor) RSA was the son of a Scottish businessman who lived first in Bradford, Yorkshire, where Robert was born in 1847 but later moved with his family to Dunfermline and afterwards to Edinburgh when Robert was still young. Although he at the time had not had any art training he was employed at Nelson’s book publishers in Edinburgh as a book illustrator. He attended the RSA Life schools and simultaneously was taught by a French artist to paint and draw. He first exhibited at the Royal Scottish Academy in 1873 and was elected a member there in 1889. He continued to exhibit at the RSA until 1914.

McGregor travelled frequently to France in particular to Brittany and Normandy and to the Netherlands. In France he was influenced by the painters Jean-François Millet (1814–1875) and Jules Bastien-Lepage(1848–1889). In the Netherlands he was influenced by the painters Anton Mauve (1838–1888) and Jozef Israëls (1824–1911), hence the changing styles of his work. James Lewis Caw (1864–1950), director of the Scottish National Gallery and the National Portrait Gallery, wrote of McGregor that he probably was the first Scottish genre painter to apply rigorous study of tone in his work and a pleasant if restricted colourist. Although he had learned much of some of his modern Dutchmen and his pictures were individual and have a sentiment of their own. Others praised him for the combination of tone with quiet colours and the more subtle light of the Dutch coast.

McGregor died in Edinburgh in 1922.

== Exhibitions of his work ==
His work is exhibited at the National Gallery of Scotland, the public galleries of Glasgow, Dundee and Paisley and the Edinburgh City Collections

== See also ==
- List of Scots
