= Lord Lieutenant of the Isle of Wight =

Civil post in Isle of Wight, England

This is a list of people who have served as Lord Lieutenant of the Isle of Wight:

- 1 April 1974 – 1979: Louis Mountbatten, 1st Earl Mountbatten of Burma (previously Governor of the Isle of Wight)
- 1980–1985: Sir John Norris Nicholson, 2nd Baronet
- 25 February 1986 – 1995: David Seely, 4th Baron Mottistone (also Governor 1992–1995)
- 18 December 1995 – 2006: Sir Christopher Donald Jack Bland
- 24 October 2006 – 25 March 2019: Major General Sir Martin White
- 25 March 2019 – present: Susan Sheldon

== See also ==
- List of governors of the Isle of Wight
