= 1941 Doncaster by-election =

UK Parliamentary by-election

The 1941 Doncaster by-election was held on 6 February 1941. The by-election was held due to the death of the incumbent Labour MP, John Morgan. It was won by the Labour candidate Evelyn Walkden, who was unopposed in keeping with wartime convention.
