= Nicholson baronets of Luddenham (1859) =

Escutcheon of the Nicholson baronets of Luddenham

The Nicholson baronetcy, of Luddenham in New South Wales, was created in the Baronetage of the United Kingdom on 8 April 1859 for Charles Nicholson, the first Speaker of the New South Wales Legislative Council. His eldest son, the 2nd Baronet, became a prominent ecclesiastical architect.

The title became extinct on the death of the 3rd Baronet in 1986.

== Nicholson baronets, of Luddenham (1859) ==
- Sir Charles Nicholson, 1st Baronet (1808–1903)
- Sir Charles Archibald Nicholson, 2nd Baronet (1867–1949)
- Sir John Charles Nicholson, 3rd Baronet (1904–1986), left no heir.

== Extended family ==
- Archibald Keightley Nicholson, second son of the 1st Baronet, designed stained glass.
- Sir Sydney Nicholson, third son of the 1st Baronet, became organist of Westminster Abbey.
