= Martin White (British Army officer) =

British Army general (born 1944)

Major General Sir Martin White KCVO CB CBE CStJ DL
- Born: 25 March 1944 (age 82)
- Military career
- Allegiance: United Kingdom
- Branch: British Army
- Service years: 1964–1999
- Rank: Major General
- Unit: Royal Army Service Corps
- Commands: Force Maintenance Area; Logistic Support Group
- Conflicts: Gulf War
- Awards: Knight Commander of the Royal Victorian Order; Companion of the Order of the Bath; Commander of the Order of the British Empire; Commander of the Order of St John
- Other work: Lord Lieutenant of the Isle of Wight (2006–19)

Major General Sir Martin Spencer White, KCVO, CB, CBE, CStJ (born 25 March 1944) is a retired senior British Army officer who served as Lord Lieutenant of the Isle of Wight from 2006 to 2019; he had previously been Vice-Lieutenant from 1999.

White was commissioned into the Royal Army Service Corps in 1964 and, among other units, he commanded the Logistic Support Group from 1987 to 1989 and the Force Maintenance Area during the Gulf War (1990–91). On promotion to major general in 1993, he served as Director of Support for the Allied Land Forces Central Europe before being appointed Director-General of Logistic Support for the British Army from 1995 to 1998. He also served as Colonel Commandant of the Royal Logistic Corps from 1998 to 2009, and has worked in advisory roles for various private sector companies since 1999. He was appointed a Commander of the Order of the British Empire in 1991 and a Companion of the Order of the Bath in 1998. In the 2018 Birthday Honours he was appointed a Knight Commander of the Royal Victorian Order.
