= Evelyn Walkden =

Evelyn Walkden (October 1893 - 12 September 1970) was a British politician and trade unionist.

The son of a Lancashire miners' leader, he left school at 12 and fought in the First World War. He became a trade union organiser in 1928. He worked in that role until 1941 when he was elected unopposed as Member of Parliament (MP) for Doncaster, having unsuccessfully contested the seat of Rossendale in 1935 and having been prospective candidate for West Toxteth in 1939. From 1944 to 1945, he was parliamentary private secretary to the Minister of National Insurance. Re-elected in the 1945 general election, he was appointed parliamentary private secretary to the Minister of Food, and served in this role until 1946.

In 1947, during an investigation by the parliamentary Committee of Privileges into claims that Labour members had given information to journalists about confidential meetings of the Labour Party in return for payment, Walkden admitted revealing information to the Evening News. He was found guilty of breach of privilege by the Committee and reprimanded by the Speaker. Another MP, Garry Allighan, was expelled from the House. Still, Walkden was not as he admitted the offence and had paid tax on the money he had been paid. He resigned the party whip and sat as an independent until the 1950 general election, in which he did not stand.

Lord Robens commented after his death that Walkden was "an able Trade Union official and an able Parliamentarian and worked hard to bring about reforms in the rationing systems during the war. He was a thorn in the side of the black marketeers and his activities led to closing many loopholes."

Parliament of the United Kingdom
Preceded by John Morgan	Member of Parliament for Doncaster; 1941–1950	Succeeded by Ray Gunter
