= Walter Shirley Shirley =

English barrister, law writer and Liberal politician

Walter Shirley Shirley (1851 – 1 May 1888) was an English barrister and law writer and a Liberal politician.

Shirley was born Walter Shirley Smith at Doncaster, the son of William Edwood Smith twice Lord Mayor of Doncaster and Town Clerk, and his wife Jane Winteringham Shirley daughter of John Shirley attorney of Attercliffe . The family adopted the name Shirley on 23 November 1863. His grandfather was Joseph Smith (1792–1841) Alderman and Burgess of Doncaster and his great grandfather William Smith of Rotherham (1767–1829) . His uncle, Arthur Joseph Smith(1825–1891) was three times Lord Mayor of Doncaster. He was educated at Rugby School and Balliol College, Oxford. He was called to the bar at Inner Temple and went on the North Eastern circuit. He wrote several papers on legal matters.

At the 1885 general election Shirley was elected as Member of Parliament (MP) for Doncaster. He was an advanced Liberal. He resigned the seat in February 1888 but died in May that year at the age of 36.

In the 1886–87 football season, he became the first president of Doncaster Rovers football club.

== Publications ==
- A sketch of the criminal law Stevens and sons, 1880
- Leading cases made easy Stevens and sons, 1880
- A selection of leading cases in the common law Stevens and Sons, 1883
- A selection of leading cases in the criminal law Stevens and Sons, 1888

Parliament of the United Kingdom
New constituency	Member of Parliament for Doncaster; 1885 – 1888	Succeeded by Henry Wentworth-FitzWilliam
