= Fison baronets =

Baronetcy in the Baronetage of the United Kingdom

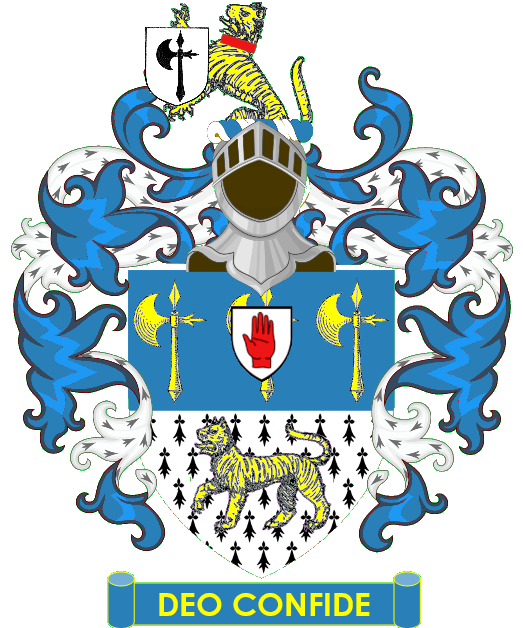
- Coat of arms of the Fison baronets of Greenholme
- Creation date: 1905
- Status: dormant
- Motto: Deo confide
- Arms: Per fess Azure and Ermine in chief three battle-axes erect Or and in base an heraldic tiger passant of the third.
- Crest: A demi heraldic tiger rampant Or collared Gules holding between the paws and escutcheon Argent charged with a battle-axe Sable.

The Fison baronetcy, of Greenholme in Burley-in-Wharfedale in the West Riding of the County of York, is a title in the Baronetage of the United Kingdom. It was created on 27 July 1905 for Frederick Fison, Member of Parliament for Doncaster from 1895 to 1906.

As of 2026, the baronetcy is considered dormant by the Official Roll.

== Fison baronets, of Greenholme (1905) ==
- Sir Frederick William Fison, 1st Baronet (1847–1927)
- Sir Francis Geoffrey Fison, 2nd Baronet (1873–1948)
- Sir (William) Guy Fison, 3rd Baronet (1890–1964); Olympic rower 1912.
- Sir (Richard) Guy Fison, 4th Baronet (9 January 1917 – 1 October 2008); a Master of Wine in 1954.
- Sir Charles William Fison, 5th Baronet (born 1954), presumed holder, has not proved his title. There is no heir.

== Notes ==
Baronetage of the United Kingdom
Preceded by Cooper baronets	Fison baronets of Greenholme; 27 July 1905	Succeeded by Holcroft baronets
