= Alfred Short =

British trades unionist and Labour politician

Alfred Short

Alfred Short (1882 – 24 August 1938, London) was a British trades unionist and Labour politician, Member of Parliament (MP) for Wednesbury from 1918 to 1931, and for Doncaster from 1935 until 1938.

Alfred Short began his working life apprenticed to a boiler-maker at 5s. a week. He rose to become Secretary of the Sheffield Branch of the Boilermakers' Society from 1911 to 1919, and serve on Sheffield City Council from 1913 to 1919. He was also Secretary of the National Union of Docks, Wharves and Shipping Staffs. Elected an MP in 1918, Short continued other political activity: in 1922 he was chairman of the Management Committee of the General Federation of Trade Unions, and he was called to the Bar from Gray's Inn in 1923. He was Under-Secretary of State for the Home Department from 1929 to 1931. From 1931 to 1935, when he was out of the House of Commons, he worked for the Transport and General Workers' Union.

Parliament of the United Kingdom
Preceded by John Norton-Griffiths	Member of Parliament for Wednesbury; 1918–1931	Succeeded by Viscount Ednam
Preceded by Hugh Molson	Member of Parliament for Doncaster; 1935–1938	Succeeded by John Morgan
Political offices
Preceded by Sir Vivian Henderson	Under-Secretary of State for the Home Department; 1929–1931	Succeeded by Hon. Oliver Stanley
Trade union offices
Preceded by Charles Ammon	General Secretary of the National Union of Docks, Wharves and Shipping Staffs; 1919 – 1922	Succeeded by Position abolished
Preceded by New position	National Secretary (Administrative, Clerical and Supervisory) of the Transport and General Workers' Union; 1922–1923	Succeeded by Arthur Creech-Jones
Preceded by Thomas Mallalieu	Chairman of the General Federation of Trade Unions; 1922 – 1924	Succeeded by Frederick W. Birchenough
Preceded by R. Goaley	National Secretary (Administrative, Clerical and Supervisory) of the Transport and General Workers' Union; 1931–1935	Succeeded by C. E. Ackroyd
