= John Morgan (Labour politician) =

British Labour Party politician

John Morgan (21 October 1892 – 4 December 1940) was a British Labour Party politician.

Morgan was born in London and grew up in an orphanage. Upon leaving, he found work in Essex, as a labourer, then later became a farm manager in Yorkshire. This led on to farming in Sussex and then back in Essex, and Morgan travelled internationally to study agriculture. He gave the For Farmers Only series of lectures on BBC Radio in 1933, and under the pseudonym "John Sussex", he was the agricultural correspondent to the Daily Herald.

Morgan stood unsuccessfully as a Labour Party candidate in East Grinstead at the 1924 United Kingdom general election, both Maidstone and Rugby in 1929, and Bosworth in 1931, then lost at Leicester West in 1935 by only 87 votes. He was elected as the Member of Parliament for Doncaster in the West Riding of Yorkshire at a by-election in November 1938, following the death of the Labour MP Alfred Short. However, he was in the House of Commons for barely two years when he died in December 1940, aged 48.

Parliament of the United Kingdom
Preceded by Alfred Short	Member of Parliament for Doncaster; 1938 – 1940	Succeeded by Evelyn Walkden
