= 1938 Doncaster by-election =

UK Parliamentary by-election

The 1938 Doncaster by-election was held on 17 November 1938. The by-election was held due to the death of the incumbent Labour MP, Alfred Short. It was won by the Labour candidate John Morgan.

Doncaster by-election, 1938
Party	Candidate	Votes	%	±%
Labour	John Morgan	31,735	61.3	+3.7
Liberal National	Alex Monteith	20,027	38.7	−3.7
Majority		11,708	22.6	+7.4
Turnout		51,762	75.4	−2.3
Labour hold		Swing		
