= William Fison =

British rower

Olympic medal record

Men's rowing
Silver medal – second place	1912 Stockholm	Eight

Coat of arms of William Fison
Crest A demi heraldic tiger rampant Or collared Gules holding between the paws an escutcheon Argent charged with a battle-axe Sable. Escutcheon Per fess Azure and Ermine in chief three battle-axes erect Or and in base a heraldic tiger passant of the third. Motto Deo Confide

Sir William Guy Fison, MC 3rd Baronet (25 October 1890 – 6 December 1964) was a British rower who competed in the 1912 Summer Olympics.

Fison was educated at Eton College and New College, Oxford. He was the bowman of the New College eight which won the silver medal for Great Britain rowing at the 1912 Summer Olympics.

In the First World War, Fison served as a captain in the Royal Field Artillery. He was mentioned in despatches and awarded the M.C. On his brother's death in 1948, he inherited the baronetcy.

Fison married Gwladys Rees Davies, daughter of John Robert Davies, on 3 February 1914.

Baronetage of the United Kingdom
Preceded by Francis Geoffrey Fison	Baronet (of Greenholme); 1948–1964	Succeeded by Richard Guy Fison
