= A. W. Burrows =

British trade unionist (1884–1966)

Alfred William Burrows (1884 – 28 March 1966) was a British trade unionist.

Born in Leicester, Burrows began working for a local co-operative retailer, and joined the Amalgamated Union of Co-operative Employees. In 1921, this became part of the National Union of Distributive and Allied Workers (NUDAW), and Burrows became its full-time Midlands Divisional Officer; he served until 1936, when he replaced John Jagger as Organising Secretary.

In 1947, NUDAW merged with the Shop Assistants' Union to form the Union of Shop, Distributive and Allied Workers (USDAW), and Burrows was appointed joint assistant general secretary, with Joe Hiscock. Later that year, general secretary Joseph Hallsworth stood down, and Burrows became acting general secretary, also taking Hallsworth's place on the General Council of the Trades Union Congress. He retired in 1949.

Trade union offices
Preceded by New position	Assistant General Secretary of the Union of Shop, Distributive and Allied Workers; 1947; With: Joe Hiscock	Succeeded by Joe Hiscock
Preceded by Joseph Hallsworth	Food, Drink, etc. Group representative on the General Council of the TUC; 1947 – 1949	Succeeded by Alan Birch
