= Ideological restrictions on naturalization in U.S. law =

Aspect of American legal history

There have long been ideological restrictions on naturalization in United States law. Nativism and anti-anarchism at the turn of the 20th century, the red scare in the 1920s, and further fears against communism in the 1950s each shaped United States nationality law. Though ideological exclusions on entry were largely eliminated in 1990, ideological bars arising from each of these time periods and prior still exist in American naturalization law. This long history has resulted in a naturalization statute that requires naturalization applicants to be "attached to the principles of the Constitution of the United States" (a requirement that has existed since the earliest US immigration laws) and forbids them from adhering to several more specific ideological principles such as totalitarianism, communism, and anarchism.

== History of ideological qualifications for naturalization ==
The vast majority of the earliest immigrants to the American colonies were English Protestants. A greater diversity of immigrants began to enter the colonies in the 1680s, and prior colonists were often intolerant of these newcomers. Some colonies instituted oaths of allegiance and from time to time banished persons with unpopular views. Nonetheless, no colonies screened newcomers based on their political beliefs.

Beginning in the 1790s, immigration began to be seen in a more threatening light. The 1798 Alien Act arose from fears of foreign radicals infiltrating the new nation. The law empowered the President to expel aliens "judge[d] dangerous to the peace and safety of the United States" or suspected of "treasonable or secret machinations." Though this power was never exercised before the Act's expiration, the Act established the foundations for later exclusions of aliens on an ideological basis.

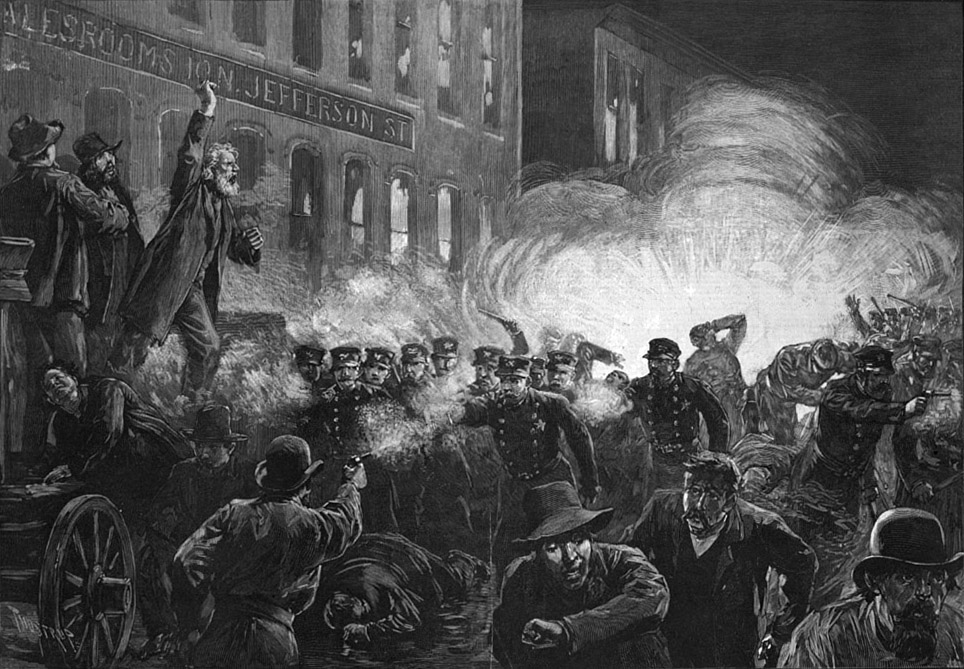
The Haymarket riot increased nativist fears of subversive aliens, which ultimately led to ideological restrictions on immigration.

In the early to mid-1800s, anti-alienism faded from view, and immigration policy was relatively liberal. However, anti-immigrant sentiment resurged in the late 1800s as the United States faced an era of economic turmoil. The strength of socialist and anarchist groups grew in the 1870s and 1880s, causing nativists to fear radicalism among the lower classes. They attributed this radicalism to the influence of foreigners, particularly the strange-seeming new immigrants from southern and eastern Europe. The 1886 Haymarket riot marked the culmination of nativist fears of subversive aliens. The 50th Congress of 1887-1889 saw 52 proposals for immigration restrictions. Though Congress passed a tightened immigration statute in 1890, the new law failed to exclude anarchists on an ideological basis.

When President William McKinley was assassinated in 1901 by an American anarchist with a foreign-sounding name, a new wave of xenophobia was unleashed. Calls to exclude anarchists from immigrating intensified, and Theodore Roosevelt's first Congressional address urged the exclusion of aliens who even espoused anarchist beliefs. At least nine anti-anarchist bills were introduced in the first session of the 57th Congress, and several Constitutional amendments were proposed that would have permitted the suppression of anarchism. The effort came to fruition in the Immigration Act of 1903, the first act barring immigration solely on the basis of political belief.

The 1903 Act rarely was invoked to exclude anarchists. Between 1903 and 1921, 38 alien anarchists were barred from immigrating. In 1908, the Department of Commerce and Labor undertook a national survey of police chiefs, attempting to identify radicals who might be targeted for deportation. Only a handful were discovered. This lack of enforcement may be explained both by the decline of the anti-nativist movement during this period of relative prosperity, and by the lack of anarchists seeking entry—the anarchist movement was on the decline worldwide, and the anarchist movement that had existed in the US was primarily driven by native-born anarchists. The primary effect of the Act was symbolic; it "constituted 'the small beginnings of a permanent and portentous federal policy."

After a decade of relative tranquility in immigration law, the outbreak of World War I fueled anti-alien sentiments yet again; this time, German immigrants were targeted. Pushed by the anti-alien fervor, Congress even more restrictive immigrations statutes in 1917 and 1920; these statutes barred even more groups on the basis of ideology. "Sabotage and destruction of property were added to the list of forbidden beliefs, deportation, unbounded by any statute of limitations, had been introduced as a means, separate and distinct from exclusion, of controlling alien radicalism; teaching and advising had joined belief and advocacy as grounds for exclusion or deportation; membership in, or affiliation with, [forbidden] organizations ... had become grounds for exclusion and deportation; [and] writing, publishing, circulating, distributing, printing, ... displaying [or possessing for the purpose of distribution] written materials advocating forbidden doctrines had become grounds for exclusion or deportation...."

The 1920 Act was passed at the tail end of the First Red Scare. In the following years of relative political calm, public demands for the removal of foreign radicals waned, and fewer radicals were in fact deported. As the US sank into the Great Depression in the early 1930s, however, alien radicals—now communists rather than anarchists—were again targeted. Various proposals were introduced in Congress to ban communist immigrants. World War II intensified anti-alien sentiment, and the Smith Act passed Congress in 1940. It banned present and former belief, advocacy, and membership as well as present. In 1941, Congress additionally authorized consular officers to deny visas to any person the officers had reason to believe would "engag[e] in activities which will endanger the public safety" and granted the president the power to deport or bar entry to aliens when required by the "interests of the United States." As the Cold War began in the late 1940s and early 1950s, intolerance of foreigners increased further.

In 1950, amidst hysteria and fear of communists, the Internal Security Act was passed into law. It expressly excluded communists, totalitarians, and fascists from the US for the first time. Unlike the 1903 Immigration Act, which excluded only a few dozen anarchists, the Internal Security Act barred thousands of foreigners from entering the US, at least on a temporary basis. When immigration laws were overhauled in the 1952 McCarran-Walter Act, these exclusions—along with all prior exclusions, such as those for anarchists—were recodified. The McCarran-Walter Act also explicitly allowed the deportation of naturalized citizens who engaged in subversive activities.

In 1987, the passage of section 901 of the Foreign Relations Authorization Act temporarily stopped many deportations based on speech or association, namely those "any past, current or expected beliefs, statements, or associations which, if engaged in by a United States citizen in the United States, would be protected under the Constitution of the United States." Several aspects of the Act, however, limited its protections. Its exemptions allowed regulation of some otherwise protected speech, and in 1988 the protections provided by the act were limited to nonimmigrant aliens, leaving resident aliens without protection.

Congress went even further with the Immigration Act of 1990. It limited the exclusion of aliens to those whose "entry or proposed activities within the United States would have potentially serious adverse foreign policy consequences." Furthermore, aliens cannot be excluded on the basis of their beliefs and activities that would be lawful in the US unless such activity "would compromise a compelling" foreign policy interest. These amendments addressed only the exclusion and deportation of aliens, however, leaving ideological restrictions on naturalization untouched.

== Current ideological restrictions on naturalization ==
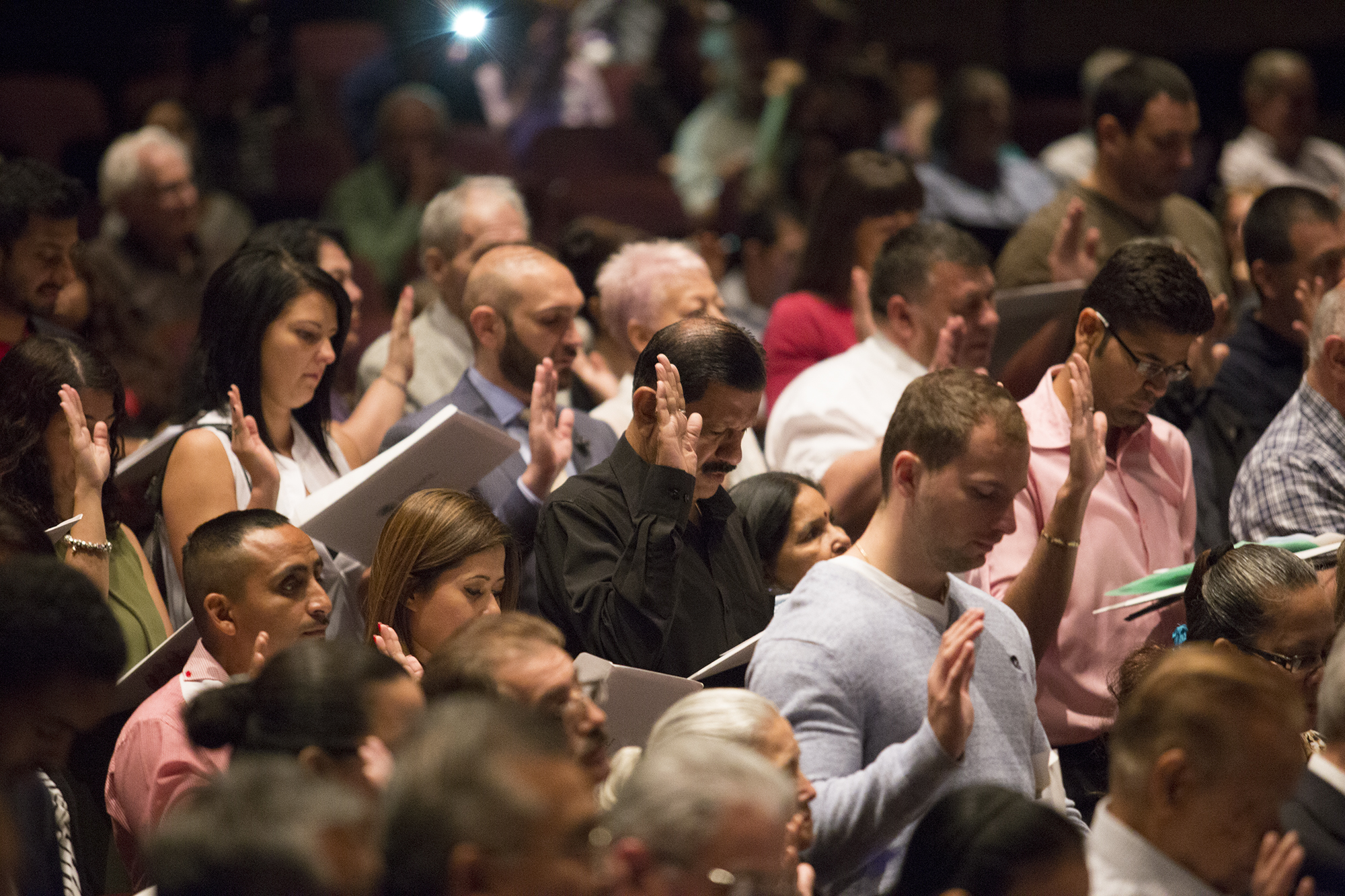
Candidates of various backgrounds taking the Oath of Allegiance at a naturalization ceremony at the College of DuPage.

Several ideological requirements for naturalization remain under U.S. law. First is the requirement that the applicant be "attached to the principles of the Constitution of the United States, and well disposed to the good order and happiness of the same." This is essentially a political test, though it "should be construed ... in accord with the theory and practice of our government in relation to freedom of conscience." The statutory requirement is elaborated in the Code of Federal Regulations, which provides: "Attachment implies a depth of conviction which would lead to active support of the Constitution. Attachment and favorable disposition relate to mental attitude, and contemplate the exclusion from citizenship of applicants who are hostile to the basic form of government of the United States, or who disbelieve in the principles of the Constitution." Even still, the ideological requirement is "nebulous"; it begs the questions of what the "basic form of government of the United States" is and what the key "principles of the Constitution" are to which the applicant must subscribe.

In Schneiderman v. United States (regarding deportation of CPUSA California state party leader William Schneiderman), the case to develop the attachment requirement in the most detail, the court evaluated the circumstances of a young man whose naturalization was allegedly fraudulent for his failure to satisfy the attachment requirement. The man had been a member of two communist organizations at the time of his naturalization. Upon questioning, he stated that he "subscribed 'to the philosophy and principles of Socialism as manifested in the writings of Lenin'" but "denied that he ... advocated the overthrow of the Government of the United States by force" and "considered membership in the Party compatible with the obligations of American citizenship, believing that "socialism could be achieved here by democratic processes."

The court held that the government had not proved that the man failed to satisfy the attachment requirement. The opinion's broad language emphasized the compatibility of dissident political views with attachment to the constitution. "The constitutional fathers, fresh from a revolution, did not forge a political strait-jacket for the generations to come", wrote Justice Frank Murphy. The Court observed that Article V of the United States Constitution provides an amendment process without specifying a limit on the scope of amendments and that "the many important and far-reaching changes made in the Constitution since 1787 refute the idea that attachment to any particular provision or provisions is essential, or that one who advocates radical changes is necessarily not attached to the Constitution." It further cautioned that "sincerity of desires to improve the constitution should not be judged by conformity to prevailing thought", because the freedom of thought is the utmost Constitutional value.

Beyond the general attachment provision, there are several supplementary specific ideological bars. These exclusions affect anarchists, communists, totalitarians, and advocates of assassination, government overthrow by force, destruction of property, and sabotage. The bars apply only to applicants who espoused forbidden views or were members of forbidden groups in the 10 years prior to applying for naturalization; earlier beliefs or membership are not disqualifying. Other exemptions from the bar include involuntary membership, membership without awareness of the group's aims, membership under the age of 16, and membership for the purpose of the obtaining food rations or other essentials of living.

The nature of the conduct or belief that invokes the bar differs among these ideologies. For communists and totalitarians, the prohibited activities are membership and affiliation with relevant organizations, the advocacy of relevant doctrines, the publishing of relevant doctrines, and the association with organizations that advocate or publish relevant doctrines. The bar on communism forbids the advocacy of the establishment of communism in the United States, whereas the bar on totalitarianism forbids the advocacy of the establishment of totalitarianism anywhere in the world. For advocates of assassination, government overthrow by force, destruction of property, and sabotage, the prohibited activities are advocacy, writing and publishing materials that advocate, and membership in an organization that publishes such materials.

For any membership-related bar to come into operation, a court must find that the membership was a "meaningful association". Simply putting one's name on party rolls is insufficient. The individual must have affiliated with the party for primarily political reasons, and his activities in the party must evidence the individual's "awareness of the Party's political aspect". Courts have found a lack of meaningful association in cases where members of trade unions or political movements are unaware the organizations are dominated by the communist party, and even in cases where communist party members attended party meetings, paid dues, or ran the party's bookstore.

== Ideological requirements and the First Amendment ==
In other contexts, regulations of speech based on content or viewpoint are presumptively invalid under the First Amendment to the United States Constitution, being evaluated using the "most exacting scrutiny." Nonetheless, the Supreme Court has explicitly upheld viewpoint-discriminatory statutes in the context of immigration law, though its statements about the free speech rights of aliens have been "various and contradictory." The constitutionality of the 1903 Act was upheld by the Supreme Court in United States ex rel. Turner v. Williams. The court concluded that Congress "possesses the plenary power to exclude aliens on whatever ground [it] deems fit." Similarly, in Kleindienst v. Mandel, the Supreme Court cited Congress's plenary power over immigration laws as the basis for applying an extremely deferential standard of review to the statutory exclusion of communist aliens from the United States. No ideological naturalization restriction has been overturned on First Amendment grounds.

== See also ==
- Oath of Allegiance (United States)
