= Joe Hiscock =

British trade union official (1904–1986)

Joseph David Hiscock OBE (1904 – 15 September 1986) was a British trade union official.

Hiscock began working for the National Amalgamated Union of Shop Assistants, Warehousemen and Clerks in 1921. In 1946, it became part of the new Union of Shop, Distributive and Allied Workers (USDAW). The Shop Assistants' general secretary, G. Maurice Hann, was expected to become joint assistant general secretary of the new union, but he left to find other work, and Hiscock was instead appointed.

Hiscock soon became sole assistant general secretary of USDAW, and remained in post until his retirement in 1964. He represented the union on the executive of the International Federation of Commercial, Clerical, Professional and Technical Employees (FIET), and from 1962 to 1964 served as president of FIET.

In the 1952 New Year Honours, Hiscock was made an Officer of the Order of the British Empire.

Trade union offices
Preceded by New position	Assistant General Secretary of the Union of Shop, Distributive and Allied Workers; 1947–1964; With: A. W. Burrows (1947)	Succeeded by John Phillips
Preceded by Algot Jonsson	President of the International Federation of Commercial, Clerical, Professional and Technical Employees; 1962–1964	Succeeded by James Suffridge
