= Alan Birch =

Alan Birch is the name of:

- Alan Birch (footballer) (born 1956), English footballer
- Alan Birch (trade unionist) (1909–1961), British trade union leader
