= G. Maurice Hann =

British trade unionist

George Maurice Hann CBE (1 October 1885 – 27 March 1980) was a British trade unionist.

Born in Bristol, Hann worked as a shop assistant, and joined the National Amalgamated Union of Shop Assistants, Warehousemen and Clerks (NAUSAWC) in 1903. He was very quickly elected to the union's executive, and also became active in the Independent Labour Party. Through these activities, he met Florence Exten, and the two married in 1913.

Also in 1913, Hann began working as a full-time union organiser. He moved to London, and was active in opposing World War I. In 1934, he chaired a major labour pageant, organised by the Central Women's Organisation Committee of the London Trades Council.

In 1935, Hann was appointed as National Organiser for NAUSAWC then, the following year, he was elected as the union's general secretary. In the role, he was known for his negotiating skills and knowledge of economics. He began working closely with Joseph Hallsworth of the rival National Union of Distributive and Allied Workers, and in 1947 the two unions merged, forming the Union of Shop, Distributive and Allied Workers. Hann was expected to become joint Assistant General Secretary of the new union, but resigned to work full-time for the Industrial Court.

Hann retired in 1956, and was made a Commander of the Order of the British Empire. He and Florence moved to Stanmore, and he lived until 1980.

Trade union offices
Preceded by John Leslie	General Secretary of the National Amalgamated Union of Shop Assistants, Warehousemen and Clerks; 1936–1946	Succeeded by Position abolished
