= Denaturalization in the United States =

Denaturalization is the process by which the United States government rescinds a naturalized U.S. citizen’s U.S. citizenship. The are various grounds under which a naturalized citizen may be subject to denaturalization but generally it may occur when a naturalized citizen either illegally procures naturalization or procures it through a willful misrepresentation or concealment of a material fact.

== Process and result of denaturalization ==
The process is usually initiated by a referral from United States and Citizenship Services (USCIS) to the United States Department of Justice (DOJ) when the agency identifies an individual as subject to grounds for denaturalization.

The DOJ can seek to revoke a naturalized citizen’s citizenship through a civil proceeding or a criminal conviction.

In a civil proceeding, the DOJ begins the denaturalization process by filing a civil lawsuit, to revoke the citizenship (which sets aside the order that admitted the individual to citizenship) and to invalidate the naturalization certificate, in the federal district court where the naturalized citizen resides at the time of the suit.

18 U.S.C. § 1425 criminalizes the unlawful procurement of naturalization or the unlawful procurement of documentary evidence of naturalization or citizenship. A conviction under 18 U.S.C. § 1425 automatically revokes naturalization. In this instance, the U.S. Attorney’s office files criminal charges against the individual. There is a 10-year statutory bar to bring this action. Upon conviction, the court that has jurisdiction to hear the case revokes the citizenship, setting aside the order admitting the person to citizenship, and cancels the naturalization certificate.

After a person is denaturalized, they revert to the immigration status they held at the time of naturalization.

== Burden ==
The government faces a high burden of proof in denaturalization cases.

For criminal denaturalization cases, as they are inherently criminal proceedings, the burden of proof is proof beyond a reasonable doubt.

Still, the burden is high for civil denaturalization cases. As first established in the seminal denaturalization case, Schneiderman v. United States, “the facts and the law should be construed as far is reasonably possible in favor of the citizen” and the government’s evidence to revoke the grant of naturalization must be “clear, unequivocal, and convincing’ – ‘it cannot be done upon a bare preponderance of evidence which leaves the issue in doubt.’” Klapprott v. United States has suggested an even more exacting standard finding that “the burden is substantially identical with that required in criminal cases – proof beyond a reasonable doubt.”

== Grounds for denaturalization ==
=== Illegal procurement ===
Obtaining naturalization through illegal procurement is a ground for denaturalization. Illegal procurement simply means that the person was statutorily ineligible for naturalization, meaning the person did not meet all the requirements for naturalization when it was obtained. In theory, a person need not have willfully misrepresented nor concealed any material fact to then be found to have been statutory ineligible for naturalization when it was obtained.

=== Willful misrepresentation or concealment of material fact ===
Another ground for denaturalization is a naturalized citizen willfully misrepresented or concealed a material fact when obtaining naturalization. A fact or omission is material if it would have “been predictably capable of affecting, i.e., to have had a natural tendency to affect” the decision. It can include misrepresentations or omissions made in the application, in documentary evidence submitted, and the naturalization interview.

=== Membership in certain organizations ===
Membership in certain organizations is another pathway to denaturalization. Under 8 USC § 1424 a person is prohibited from naturalization if they favor opposing law, government or favor totalitarian forms of government and the statute breaks this down into generally the following organizations or associations:

- Communist Party in the U.S. or any foreign government;
- Totalitarian party in the U.S. or any foreign government;
- Those who advocate, teach, and publish/disseminate materials for the overthrow of the United States government through unlawful means; and
- Those who advocate, teach, and publish/disseminate materials relating to opposition to all organized government.

The government may seek a denaturalization action for any naturalized citizen that within 5 years of naturalizing became a member of any of the organizations found under 8 USC § 1424 that would have prevented their naturalization. This membership constitutes a rebuttable presumption that the individual “was not attached to the principles of the Constitution of the United States and was not well disposed to the good order and happiness of the United States at the time of naturalization,” which are requirements for naturalization.

Case law has established that membership alone is not enough. The Supreme Court has reversed denaturalization orders where the Government’s only proof was that the naturalized citizen had been a Communist Party member during the applicable statutory period. Instead, the Government must show by “clear, unequivocal, and convincing evidence” that the member knows the relevant organization advocated the kind of violent overthrow of government or ideology under 8 USC § 1424 that bars naturalization. This knowledge is then sufficient to show that the member is not in fact “attached to the principles of the Constitution of the United States and was not well disposed to the good order and happiness of the United States.”

== Prevalence of denaturalization ==
Historically, denaturalization has been uncommon and reserved for naturalized citizens who have failed to disclose or misrepresented past serious crimes or membership the types of organizations that bar a person from naturalization. Here is a List of denaturalized former citizens of the United States, reflecting mostly a list of individuals who have been denaturalized because of crimes in connection with World War II or association with Nazis, crimes involving terrorist association, and other serious crimes. Serious criminal actions, like varying sexual assault crimes, financial fraud crimes, and distribution of contraband like weapons and controlled substances, remain a common basis for denaturalization actions. Falsely representing one’s identity to obtain an immigration benefit is another common basis for denaturalization actions.

The annual number of denaturalization cases instituted, and the total number of individuals denaturalized has historically been low. The Library of Congress’s Congressional Research Service reports that “[b]etween 1968 and 2013, fewer than 150 individuals were denaturalized.” The Immigration Legal Resource Center (ILRC) reports that from 1990 to 2017, the average number of cases opened yearly was 11.

There has been a renewed interest in denaturalization enforcement which may be traced to President Obama’s presidency with Operation Janus. Operation Janus investigated persons with prior removal (or deportation) orders who later naturalized using different names. During President Trump’s first term, the administration continued these investigations in Operation Second Look with an aim to review 700,000 files.

Various reports show an increase in denaturalization cases brought forth since the first Trump presidency. The Immigration Legal Resource Center (ILRC) reports that the average number of denaturalization cases opened yearly increased to 25 during the first Trump administration. The National Immigration Forum reports that USCIS identified about 2,500 potential cases for referral with ultimately 168 cases filed during President Trump’s first term. The National Immigration Forum reports 64 cases were filed during President Biden’s term.

The current Trump administration has affirmatively declared in a June 11, 2025 internal Department of Justice Memorandum that its Civil Division will be prioritizing pursuing civil denaturalization cases. The Memo identifies the following categories of denaturalization cases the Department will aim to pursue:

1. Cases against individuals who pose a potential danger to national security, including those with a nexus to terrorism, espionage, or the unlawful export from the United States of sensitive goods, technology, or information raising national security concerns;
2. Cases against individuals who engaged in torture, war crimes, or other human rights violations;
3. Cases against individuals who further or furthered the unlawful enterprise of criminal gangs, transnational criminal organizations, and drug cartels;
4. Cases against individuals who committed felonies that were not disclosed during the naturalization process;
5. Cases against individuals who committed human trafficking, sex offenses, or violent crimes;
6. Cases against individuals who engaged in various forms of financial fraud against the United States (including Paycheck Protection Program (“PPP”) loan fraud and Medicaid/Medicare fraud);
7. Cases against individuals who engaged in fraud against private individuals, funds, or corporations;
8. Cases against individuals who acquired naturalization through government corruption, fraud, or material misrepresentations, not otherwise addressed by another priority category;
9. Cases referred by a United States Attorney’s Office or in connection with pending criminal charges, if those charges do not fit within one of the other priorities; and
10. Any other cases referred to the Civil Division that the Division determines to be sufficiently important to pursue.

There has been an increase in denaturalization cases brought forth in 2026. TRAC Immigration reports 39 suits in 2026, as of June 17, 2026, with 33 of the suits instituted from May to June 12, 2026. On October 5, 2026, the Department of Justice announced "the largest single-period filing" of 40 denaturalization cases against individuals on various grounds, including serious criminal offenses (including money laundering, drug offenses, and various sexual assault crimes) identity fraud, and marriage fraud.

There is concern among immigrant advocacy groups that the number of denaturalization cases will only continue to rise considerably and may lead to denaturalization actions for minor omissions or “misrepresentations” in the naturalization process.

== Modern political targeting ==
There are also concerns that denaturalization is being weaponized by President Trump and other Republican lawmakers to punish foreign-born, naturalized political opponents.

During the summer of 2025, President Trump publicly questioned the validity of then-New York City mayoral candidate Zohran Mamdani’s U.S. citizenship and stated that the administration would potentially investigate him. That same summer, Republican lawmaker, Andy Ogles, submitted a post on X referring to Mr. Mamdani as “Zohran ‘little muhammad’ Mandami” and calling for denaturalization proceedings to be instituted against him. The post included a letter sent to then-Attorney General Pam Bondi, in which he alleged that Mr. Mamdani had willfully misrepresented or omitted material facts, specifically statements he had made in a rap song, “Free the Holy Land/My guys,” which the letter characterized as suggesting an unlawful affiliation and potential support for terrorism.

There is currently an ongoing public federal investigation into the immigration history of Democratic lawmaker, Ilhan Omar, and her family, which has been perceived by Democratic lawmakers as political persecution, voter intimidation shortly prior to mid-term elections, and the weaponization of the administration’s resources. On October 12, 2026, 22 days prior to elections in which Ms. Omar seeks reelection, Department of Homeland Security agents executed a search warrant of her Washington D.C. home and obtained a DNA sample from her. 175 Democratic members of Congress signed a letter to Attorney General Todd Blanche condemning the search, characterizing it as political weaponization, and accusing the Department of interfering with the rights of the people of Minnesota to a free and fair election.

The investigation into Ms. Omar is multifaceted and includes various prior immigrations filings. There is a marriage fraud claim, but this was when she was already a U.S. citizen and she was petitioning her then-husband for a green card and it seems unlikely she could be subject to denaturalization proceedings on a marriage fraud finding. However, statements and information provided on Ms. Omar’s own naturalization paperwork and even older applications filed by her and her family shortly after their arrival as refugees in the 1990s are also being reviewed, which could potentially put her at risk for denaturalization proceedings if they are found to fall under any of the grounds for denaturalization, like a willful misrepresentation or concealment of material fact.
