= Percy Cottrell =

British trade unionist

Percy Cottrell (1881 – 2 February 1948) was a British trade unionist.

Born in Delph, Cottrell began working at the Delph Co-operative Society at the age of ten. He joined the Amalgamated Union of Co-operative Employees (AUCE) and in 1902 became the founding president of the Saddleworth Trades Council. He received a Trades Union Congress scholarship to study at Ruskin College, receiving a diploma in economics and political science.

Cottrell gradually rose in the Delph Co-op, until in 1923 he became president of the society. The AUCE became part of the National Union of Distributive and Allied Workers, and Cottrell came to serve as the Manchester divisional representative on its executive. In 1942, he was elected as its president. He remained in post when, in 1947, it became part of the new Union of Shop, Distributive and Allied Workers, but died early in 1948.

Trade union offices
Preceded by John Jagger	President of the National Union of Distributive and Allied Workers; 1942–1946	Succeeded by Union merged
Preceded by New position	President of the Union of Shop, Distributive and Allied Workers; 1947–1948	Succeeded by Walter Padley
