= John Leslie (politician) =

British politician (1873–1955)

John Robert Leslie, MP (3 November 1873 – 12 January 1955) was a Labour Party politician in the United Kingdom.

He was born in Lerwick, Shetland, Scotland to John Leslie and Clementina Hunter. Leslie and his wife had three sons, John, William and Robert, and two daughters, Clementina and Alice. He moved to London from Edinburgh, where his first son was born, in 1912.

He was elected as Member of Parliament (MP) for Sedgefield in County Durham at the 1935 general election, defeating the Conservative Party MP Roland Jennings, who had been elected in 1931. When discussing the 1938 Hire Purchase Act, Leslie made antisemitic accusations over the apparent involvement of Jewish people in extortionate hire-purchase agreements: 'I do not want to raise racial prejudices, but hon. Members can guess his nationality'. John Leslie held the seat until he retired from the House of Commons at the 1950 general election.

Parliament of the United Kingdom
Preceded by Roland Jennings	Member of Parliament for Sedgefield; 1935–1950	Succeeded by Joseph Slater
Trade union offices
Preceded by John Turner	General Secretary of the National Amalgamated Union of Shop Assistants, Warehousemen and Clerks; 1924 – 1935	Succeeded by G. Maurice Hann
Preceded by John Turner	Food, Drink, etc. Group representative on the General Council of the TUC; 1925 – 1926	Succeeded by Joseph Hallsworth
