= Alan Birch (trade unionist) =

British trade union leader (1909–1961)

- Born: John Alan Birch; 20 December 1909; Warrington, Cheshire, England
- Died: 13 December 1961 (aged 51)

John Alan Birch (20 December 1909 – 13 December 1961) was a British trade union leader.

== Early life ==
Born in Warrington, Birch worked in retail and joined the National Union of Distributive and Allied Workers (NUDAW) in 1927. He trained in secretarial skills in his spare time, and used this experience to become secretary of his union branch, then area organiser and national organiser.

NUDAW merged to form the Union of Shop, Distributive and Allied Workers in 1947 and, two years later, Birch was elected as general secretary. While general secretary, he also served on the General Council of the Trades Union Congress (TUC), and chaired the TUC's Economic Committee.

In his spare time, Birch sat on a large number of government committees and quangos, including the National Coal Board, Monopolies Commission, Economic Planning Board and Central Price Regulation Committee. He was given a knighthood in June 1961, and died later in the year.

Trade union offices
| Preceded by Joseph Hallsworth | General Secretary of the Union of Shop, Distributive and Allied Workers; 1949 – 1961 | Succeeded by Alf Allen |
| Preceded by A. W. Burrows | Food, Drink, etc. Group representative on the General Council of the TUC; 1949 – 1961; With: Harold Hewitt (1952–1961) | Succeeded by Alf Allen |
