= United States ex rel. Turner v. Williams =

- Supreme Court of the United States

Argued April 6, April 7, 1904 Decided May 16, 1904
- Full case name: United States ex rel. John Turner v. William Williams, Commissioner of Immigration for the Port of New York
- Citations: 194 U.S. 279 (more) 24 S. Ct. 719; 48 L. Ed. 979

Court membership
- Chief Justice Melville Fuller Associate Justices John M. Harlan · David J. Brewer; Henry B. Brown · Edward D. White; Rufus W. Peckham · Joseph McKenna; Oliver W. Holmes Jr. · William R. Day

Case opinion
- Majority: Fuller, joined by Harlan, Brewer, Brown, White, Peckham, McKenna, Holmes, and Day

Laws applied
- U.S. Const. amend. I; Anarchist Exclusion Act of 1903

United States ex rel. Turner v. Williams, 194 U.S. 279 (1904), or the Anarchist Exclusion Case, was a decision by the Supreme Court of the United States that held the removal of John Turner, a British anarchist, from the United States under the Anarchist Exclusion Act of 1903 did not violate the First Amendment to the United States Constitution.

== Background ==
From the nation's earliest years, Congress enacted measures providing for the inadmissibility or removal of foreigners deemed politically undesirable. For instance, on June 25, 1798, Congress enacted the Alien Friends Act, which vested the President with the authority to order removal of any foreigner who was "dangerous to the peace and safety of the United States." These measures, which were typically adopted during periods of domestic unrest or international tense, sought to address perceived ideological threats to the domestic political order.

Congress enacted the Anarchist Exclusion Act following the assassination of President William McKinley by twenty-eight year old Polish-American anarchist Leon Czolgosz. British anarchist John Turner was arrested in New York City on October 23, 1903, having been found with a copy of a Johann Most pamphlet. The federal government sought to remove Turner under section 38 of the Anarchist Exclusion Act on grounds that he was a foreigner "who disbelieves in or who is opposed to all organized government". The following excerpt is from one of the public statements that the government cited in support of removing Turner, amid the heightened fears that followed the Haymarket affair:

If no work was being done, if it were Sunday for a week or a fortnight, life in New York would be impossible, and the workers, gaining audacity, would refuse to recognize the authority of their employers... and to me, at any rate, as an anarchist, as one who believes that the people should emancipate themselves, I look forward to this struggle as an opportunity for the workers to assert the power that is really theirs.

Turner's attorney Clarence Darrow argued the act was unconstitutionally broad because it included non-violent anarchists. The government argued that Congress's power to regulate immigration and naturalization was well-settled. Future Supreme Court Justice James Clark McReynolds represented the government.

== Supreme Court ==
The Supreme Court held that the Anarchist Exclusion Act did not violate the First Amendment to the United States Constitution. Finding that the law permitted Turner's removal, Chief Justice Fuller's decision emphasized that, although it was "not to be understood as depreciating the vital importance of freedom of speech and of the press," the case did not implicate those concerns because "the flaming brand which guards the realm where no human government is needed still bars the entrance; and as long as human governments endure they cannot be denied the power of self-preservation, as that question is presented here."

The Court further noted that even if the statute were construed to apply to anarchists who advocated their views as a matter of political philosophy rather than violent action, Congress could nonetheless render such foreigners inadmissible or removable if it concluded that their doctrines posed a danger to national defense or the general welfare.

=== Brewer's concurrence ===
Justice David Josiah Brewer wrote separately to explain that the responsibility of courts to review such claims in habeas allows for reconsideration of legal and factual determinations: "I do not believe it within the power of Congress to give to ministerial officers a final adjudication of the right to liberty or to oust the courts from the duty of inquiry respecting both law and facts."

Brewer reasoned that if Turner did not advocate the violent overthrow of the government, he should have introduced evidence to that effect, making it "unnecessary ... to consider what rights he would have if he were only what is called by way of differentiation a philosophical anarchist."

== Later developments ==
Because the Supreme Court's ruling, Turner became the first person to be ordered removed from the United States for violating the Anarchist Exclusion Act. However, he returned to England before the order could be executed. Upon Turner's return to England, he worked on Freedom and several other publications. He was a member of the collective that published Commonweal.

Law enforcement efforts were mostly counterproductive in the years following Turner's deportation. As public opinion turned against the government's effort to suppress anarchists, attitudes toward anarchism became increasingly sympathetic. Louis F. Post said the government's policy of suppression “had done more to advertise and propagate anarchist doctrines than ten thousand undisturbed lectures could have done". Similarly, Ernst Freund argued in a treatise that speech and writings should not be condemned merely because they “may have a tendency to arouse the public conscience".

== Legacy ==
The free speech and press rights of lawful permanent residents received nominal recognition in Bridges v. Wixon (1945) when the Supreme Court ruled that "cooperation with Communist groups for the attainment of wholly lawful objectives" was not grounds for removal. The Supreme Court avoided a constitutional ruling about the First Amendment rights of foreigners but Justice Frank Murphy had strong words about the government's efforts to deport Bridges:

The record in this case will stand forever as a monument to man‘s intolerance of man. Seldom if ever in the history of this nation has there been such a concentrated and relentless crusade to deport an individual because he dared to exercise the freedom that belongs to him as a human being and that is guaranteed to him by the Constitution.

When the Court considered the speech rights of lawful permanent residents in Harisiades v. Shaughnessy (1952), it held that that there was no violation of the Ex Post Facto Clause with regard to removing past members of Communist Party USA. This reflected the Court’s view, consistent with United States ex rel. Turner v. Williams, that Congress may use its broad power over immigration and naturalization to render foreigners inadmissible or removable on ideological grounds, even when such measures burden expressive association. But, even absent formal congressional findings like those underlying the Smith Act, the Supreme Court has been reluctant to recognize selective enforcement claims by foreigners. Reno v. American-Arab Anti-Discrimination Committee (1999) held that immigration enforcement discretion was largely unreviewable, in part due to foreign policy concerns.

Under United States ex rel. Turner v. Williams much still depends on the discretion of the President and immigration officials, and immigrants will not always have the same legal rights as citizens. Michael G. Kagan commented that future presidents could "use this discretion very differently" from what the public expects.

== Works cited ==
- Johnson, Kevin R. (1997). "The Antiterrorism Act, the Immigration Reform Act, and Ideological Regulation in the Immigration Laws: Important Lessons for Citizens and Noncitizens". St. Mary's Law Journal. 28 (4).
