= National Union of Warehouse and General Workers =

Former trade union of the United Kingdom

- Merged into: National Union of Distributive and Allied Workers
- Founded: 1911
- Dissolved: 1921
- Headquarters: Spekeland Buildings, 22 Canning Place, Liverpool
- Location: United Kingdom
- Key people: William Albert Robinson (Gen Sec)
- Affiliations: TUC, NTWF

The National Union of Warehouse and General Workers was a trade union representing workers, mostly in commercial warehouses, in the United Kingdom.

The union was founded in 1911 when six local unions in Liverpool and Manchester merged, forming the Amalgamated General and Warehouse Workers' Union. Although the majority of members worked in commercial warehouses, one of the founding unions included tobacco workers, who also transferred to the new union. In 1913, the union renamed itself as the "National Union of Warehouse and General Workers".

The membership of the union varied considerably; it had 6,000 members on formation, but this fell to 4,000 the following year, before rising to 7,688 in 1915. It recruited huge numbers of members during World War I, and by 1920 claimed a membership of 96,000. It was particularly successful in recruiting toymakers, and by the end of the war, around 2,000 of its members worked in the sector.

At the start of 1921, the union merged with the Amalgamated Union of Co-operative Employees, forming the National Union of Distributive and Allied Workers.

== General Secretaries ==
1911: Joseph Cleary
c.1920: William Albert Robinson
