= William Flanagan (politician) =

British wadding and wool merchant and politician

William Henry Flanagan
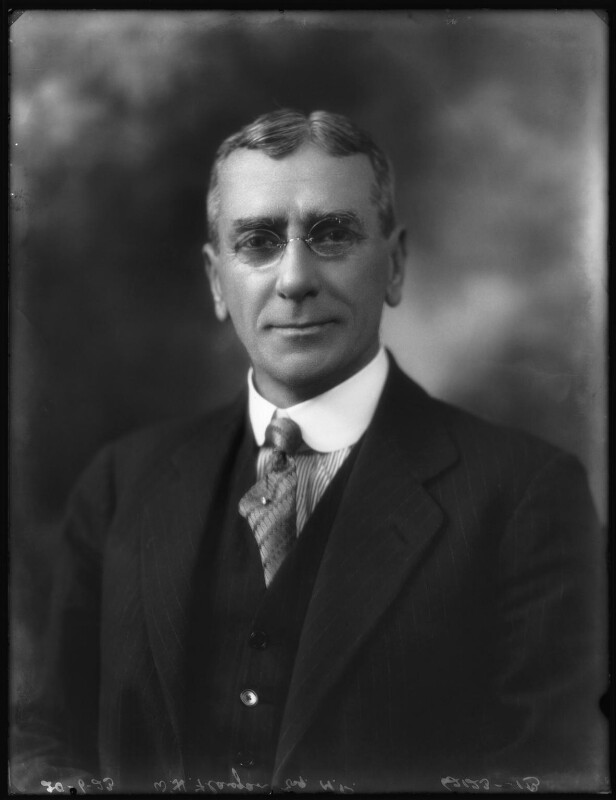

Member of Parliament for Manchester Clayton
- In office 15 November 1922 – 6 December 1923
- Preceded by: John Edward Sutton
- Succeeded by: John Edward Sutton
- In office 27 October 1931 – 14 November 1935
- Preceded by: John Edward Sutton
- Succeeded by: John Jagger

Personal details
- Born: 8 April 1871 Manchester, Lancashire, England
- Died: 21 June 1944 (aged 73) Fylde, Lancashire, England
- Party: Conservative and Unionist Party
- Spouse: Lilian Mary Flanagan (nee Ashley)
- Children: Reginald William Ashley Flanagan; Kathleen Flanagan; Lilian Myra Flanagan
- Occupation: Wadding and wool merchant

William Henry Flanagan (8 April 1871 – 21 June 1944) was a British wadding and wool merchant and a Conservative and Unionist Party politician. He was the member of parliament (MP) for Manchester Clayton twice, from 1922 to 1923 and from 1931 to 1935.

Flanagan was born in Manchester on 8 April 1871, the son of Willian and Emma Flanagan. His father was a wadding manufacturer and Flanagan, who started as an apprentice, followed his father into the wadding business. He married Lilian Mary Ashley in 1899.

On 15 January 1922 Edward Hopkinson, Member of Parliament for Manchester Clayton, died and Flanagan was adopted as Coalition Unionist candidate for the resulting by-election. Flanagan is described as the managing director of the Imperial Patent Wadding Company Limited.

Flanagan was beaten in the by-election by John Edward Sutton, a trade union official and Labour candidate. Flanagan had 11,038 votes to Sutton's 14,662. Within a few months, on 15 November 1922, a general election was called and this time Flanagan beat Sutton and was elected as member of parliament for Manchester Clayton. In December 1923, a further general election was held resulting in a win for Sutton.

It was not until the 1931 general election that Flanagan won the seat again and return to Parliament. He held the seat until the 1935 general election when he decided not stand because of ill-health.

Flanagan died on 21 June 1944.

Parliament of the United Kingdom
Preceded by John Edward Sutton	Member of Parliament for Manchester Clayton; 1922 – 1923	Succeeded by John Edward Sutton
Preceded by John Edward Sutton	Member of Parliament for Manchester Clayton; 1931 – 1935	Succeeded by John Jagger
