= William Schneiderman =

Secretary of the Communist Party USA for California

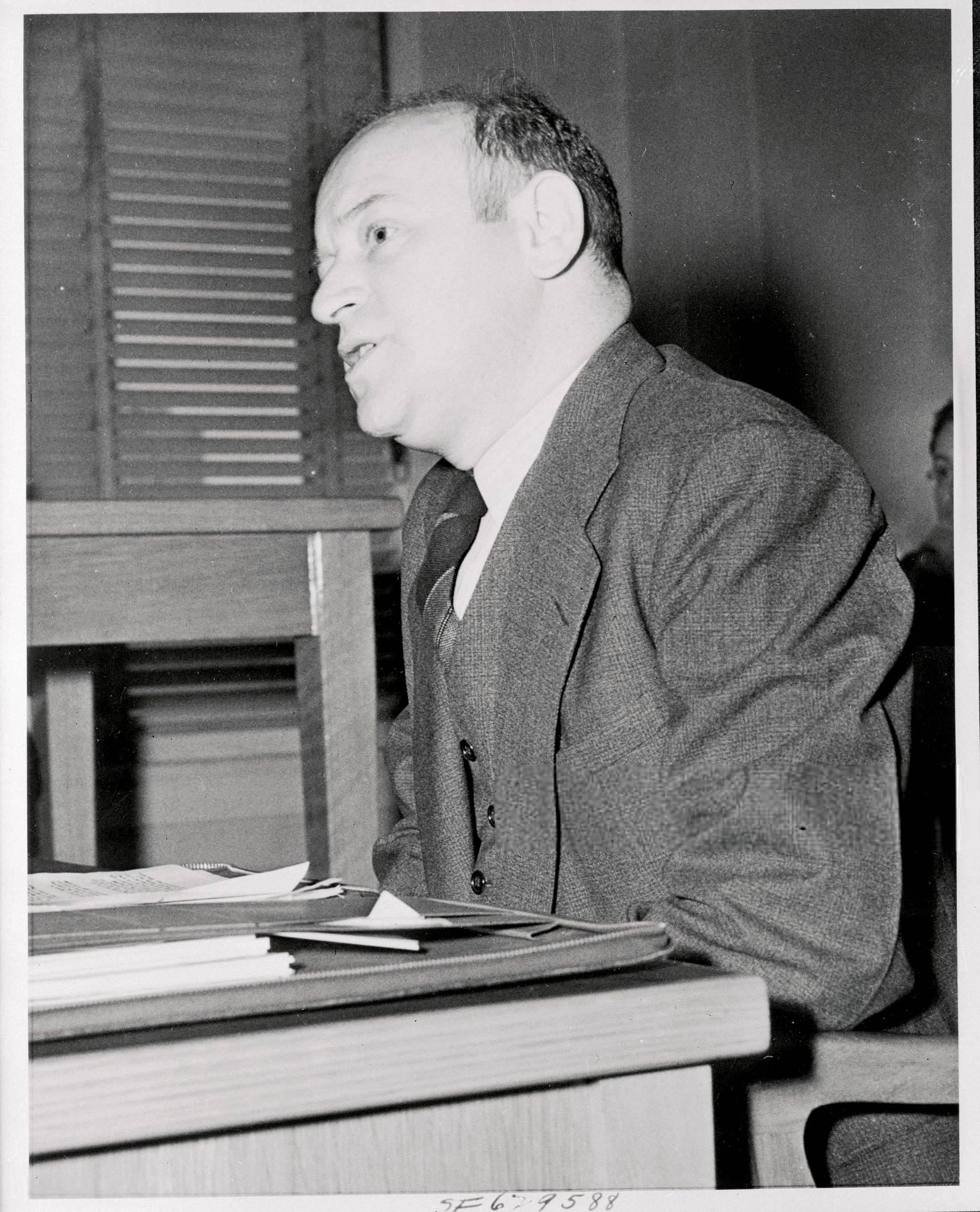
Shneiderman testifying before the State Assembly, 1941

William V. Schneiderman (December 14, 1905 – January 29, 1985) was an American politician activist who was secretary for California in the Communist Party USA (CPUSA) and involved in two cases before the United States Supreme Court, Stack v. Boyle and Schneiderman v. United States.

== Background ==
William V. Schneiderman was born on December 14, 1905, in Romanovo, Russian Empire, and came with his parents to Chicago at the age of two. In the 1920s, the Schneiderman family moved to Los Angeles. He studied political science at the University of California at Los Angeles but had to drop out to help support his family and completed his degree forty years later.

Circa 1921, Schneiderman joined the Young Communist League at age 16, and circa 1923 the Communist Party (then the Workers Party of America) at age eighteen. In 1927, he became a naturalized citizen.

== Career ==
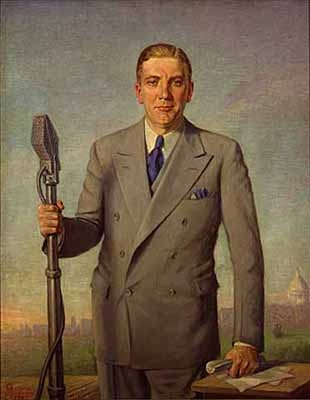
Schneiderman lost an election to 22nd Governor of Minnesota Floyd B. Olson (1930)

In 1925, the Simon Levi Company fired Schneiderman, "fingered by the Red Squad."

In 1930, the Party made him a district organizer in New England and then to Minnesota, where he ran in the 1932 Minnesota gubernatorial election for the CPUSA.

In 1935, Schneiderman visited the USSR.

In 1936, Schneiderman returned to the States to become state secretary of the Communist Party, a position he held until 1957. For much of his life, he worked as an accountant to support his family.

In March 1941, J. Robert Oppenheimer came under investigation by the Federal Bureau of Investigation (FBI), who had opened a file on Oppenheimer in March 1941, after he had attended a December 1940 meeting at the home of Haakon Chevalier which Schneiderman and Party treasurer Isaac Folkoff.

On February 13, 1948, the Daily People's World (now People's World) mentioned that Schneiderman had written an introduction for a new version of the Manifesto of the Communist Party called The Communist Manifesto in Pictures.

During testimony on May 6, 1949, Paul Crouch spoke at length about efforts by the CPUSA to continue to infiltrate the U.S. Army. He also mentioned alleged communists known to him, including Harry Bridges (strike organizer), Schneiderman (California CP), J. Robert Oppenheimer (atomic scientist), and Haakon Chevalier (translator).

In 1964, Schneiderman stepped down as chairman of the Communist Party of California.

== Legal cases ==
=== Schneiderman v. United States (1943) ===
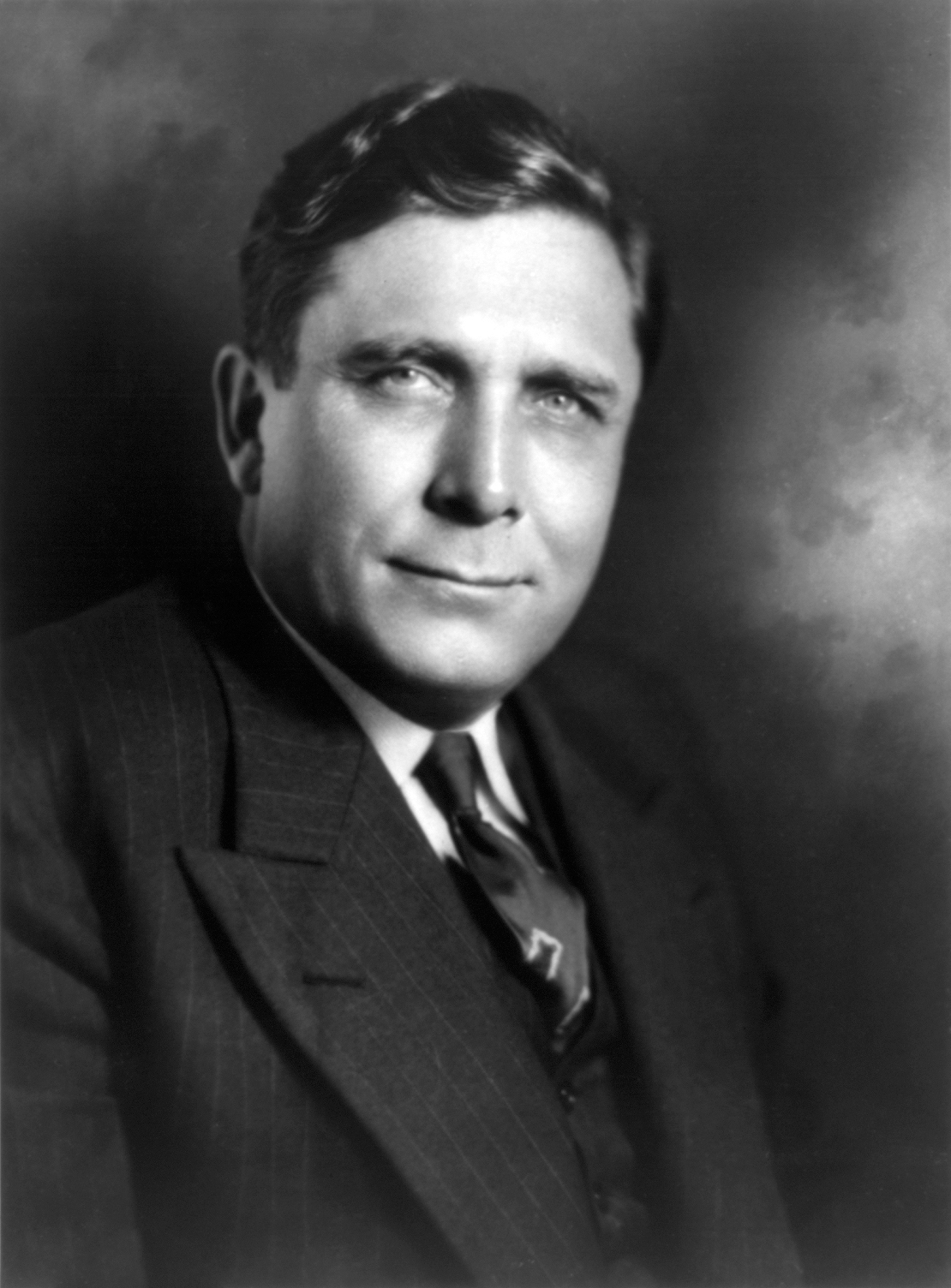
Schneiderman received gratis legal help from Republican presidential candidate Wendell Willkie (undated)

This case involved naturalization, citizenship, deportation, and ideological restrictions on naturalization in U.S. law.

In 1927, when becoming a citizen, Schneiderman had to claim he was a person "attach[ed] to the principles of the Constitution." In 1939, the US government sought to revoke his citizenship shortly after Joseph Stalin reversed Soviet (Comintern) foreign policy by signing the Hitler-Stalin Pact. In 1939, a federal judge ruled for Schneiderman's deportation because he had lied about political affiliation when becoming a citizen.

Future California attorney general Robert W. Kenny defended him but lost, and Schneiderman lost his citizenship.

In 1940, Wendell Willkie won Schneiderman's case gratis before the United States Supreme Court.

Carol Weiss King's co-representation of Schneiderman exemplifies her success in enlisting other (male) attorneys to work for free on key constitutional cases — in this case, recruiting Willkie to represent Schneiderman before the Supreme Court. King won this case in 1943, preventing the Government's revocation of the Communist Party leader's citizenship. Support had come from the American Committee for the Protection of Foreign Born, of which King and Kenny were members, as they were also members of the National Lawyers Guild. Schneiderman was the American Committee for the Protection of Foreign Born's second major victory, following work for Harry Bridges, leader of the International Longshoremen's Association (ILA) during the 1934 West Coast waterfront strike.

=== Stack v. Boyle (1951) ===
In 1949, Schneiderman and 14 other California party leaders found themselves indicted and then convicted under the Smith Act for trying to overthrow the government. The defendants were: Loretta Starvus Stack, Al Richmond, Dorothy Healey, Rose Chernin Kunitz, Albert J. Lima, Philip Marshall Connelly, Ernest Otto Fox, Carl Rude Lambert, Henry Steinberg, Oleta O'Connor Yates, and Mary Bernadette Doyle. The trial lasted six months, the longest to date in Los Angeles history. All 15 people received convictions with five-year sentences and $1,000 fines. When the case closed in 1952, Schneiderman attributed it to "prejudice and hysteria" and predicted that "the time will come when our country will not look back with pride on prosecutions of this kind."

In 1957, the Supreme Court reversed that decision for five people including Schneiderman in Stack v. Boyle.

== Personal life and death ==
Schneiderman married Leah; they had one daughter.

William V. Schneiderman died age 79 on January 29, 1985, in a hospital in San Francisco.

At the time of his death, United Press International (UPI) reported his title as "Chairman of the Communist Party of California," which newspapers used around the country when reprinting the UPI news item. (Newspapers that did not use UPI used titles like "head of the Communist Party in California" like the San Francisco Examiner or "California Communist Party leader" like the Los Angeles Times''.)

== Legacy ==
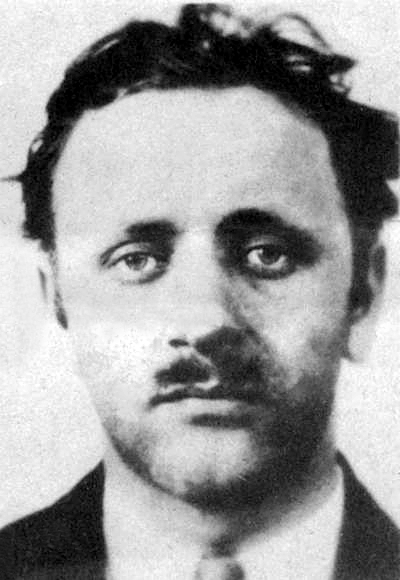
Schneiderman's circle included fellow Communist Samuel Adams Darcy (1941) (Source: City of Portland Archives, Oregon, A2001-074.120)

At the time of his death, Schneiderman's wife said:

Bill was a very gentle man who did not believe in force and violence... He was a true believer. He was aware of errors, but he never broke with the party.

The Labor Archives and Research Center of San Francisco State University houses Schneiderman's papers. The collect includes correspondence, leaflets, clippings, pamphlets, memoranda, reports, and hearing transcripts. It also includes a draft for Dissent on Trial including one unpublished chapter.

At the Tamiment Library, Schneiderman appears in collections including those of Carol Weiss King, Gil Green, Samuel Adams Darcy, and Max Schachtman.

== Works ==
- Everything for United and Victory (1941)
- "California political perspectives and the 1948 elections," People's World (1947)
- The Communist Manifesto in Pictures, introduced by William Schneiderman (1948)
- Dissent on Trial (1982)

== See also ==
- Communist Party USA
- Young Communist League USA
- Wendell Willkie
- Stack v. Boyle
- Schneiderman v. United States
