= Harry Thorneycroft =

British hairdresser and Labour Party politician

Harry Thorneycroft (21 February 1892 – 7 March 1956) was a British hairdresser and Labour Party politician who sat in the House of Commons from 1942 to 1955.

He was educated at an elementary school, and began work in a hairdresser's shop at the age of 9. He later became President of the National Federation of Hairdressers.

During the First World War, he served overseas with the Royal Field Artillery. He was elected to Manchester City Council in 1923, and became an alderman in 1939.

Thorneycroft unsuccessfully contested the borough of Blackpool at the 1935 general election, and was elected to Parliament seven years later at a Manchester Clayton by-election in October 1942 after the death of the Labour MP John Jagger. During the Second World War, the parties in the coalition government did not contest by-elections when vacancies occurred in seats held by their coalition partners, but in the Clayton by-election Thorneycroft was opposed by an independent candidate, Major Hammond Foot. Thorneycroft received a letter of support signed by the Prime Minister, Winston Churchill, and the leaders of the other coalition parties. He was the first Labour candidate to receive such a letter, and won the seat with 93.3% of the votes.

He held the seat until the constituency was abolished for the 1955 general election, when he retired from Parliament.

From 1945 to 1947, he was Parliamentary Private Secretary (PPS) to Lord Pethick-Lawrence, the Secretary of State for India and Burma. He was then PPS to Arthur Henderson, the Secretary of State for Air, from 1947 until the Labour Government left office in 1951.

He died in hospital in London on 7 March 1956, aged 64.

Parliament of the United Kingdom
Preceded by John Jagger	Member of Parliament for Manchester Clayton; 1942 – 1955	Constituency abolished
