= James Macpherson (trade unionist) =

British trade unionist

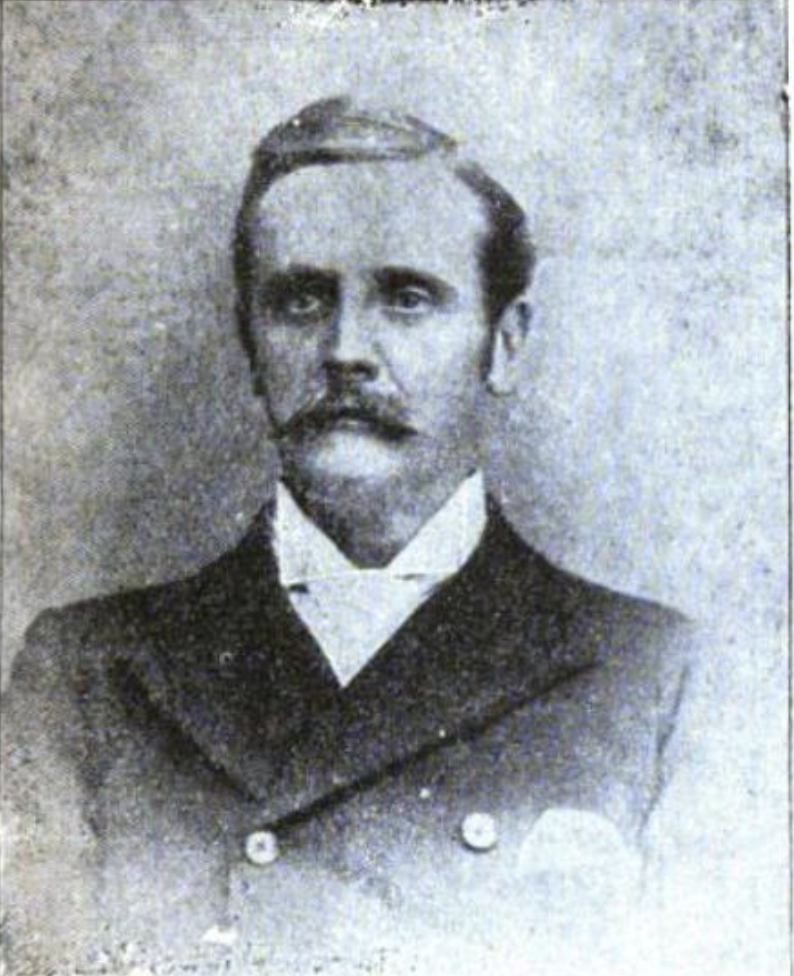
Macpherson in 1901

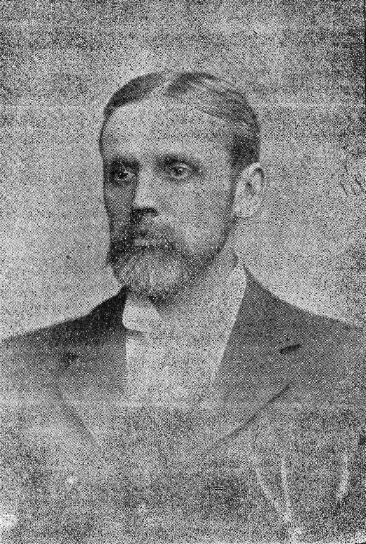
Macpherson in 1896

James Macpherson (died 1932) was a British trade unionist.

Born in Bernain, near Dunkeld in Scotland, Macpherson completed an apprenticeship as a drapers' assistant in Glasgow before moving to London in 1879. He worked in a variety of retail positions and became a founder member of the National Union of Shop Assistants.

In 1891, Macpherson joined the Social Democratic Federation and was a founder of its branch in Bow. He was elected as general secretary of the soon-renamed National Amalgamated Union of Shop Assistants, Warehousemen and Clerks in 1894, holding the post until 1912. Through this, he attended the Trades Union Congress and became involved in the Labour Representation Committee.

Margaret Bondfield was inspired to join the union after reading a letter from Macpherson in a newspaper. Macpherson was an acquaintance of her brother, and she became assistant general secretary to Macpherson from 1898.

Macpherson stood as a Labour candidate in Gravesend at the 1906 general election, although he took only 16.2% of the vote and was not elected.

Trade union offices
Preceded by William Johnson	General Secretary of the National Amalgamated Union of Shop Assistants, Warehousemen and Clerks; 1894 – 1912	Succeeded by John Turner
