= 1942 Manchester Clayton by-election =

UK Parliamentary by-election

The 1942 Manchester Clayton by-election was held on 17 October 1942. The by-election was held due to the death of the incumbent Labour MP, John Jagger. It was won by the Labour candidate Harry Thorneycroft.

Manchester Clayton by-election, 1942
Party	Candidate	Votes	%	±%
Labour	Harry Thorneycroft	8,892	93.3	+39.6
Independent	E. Hammond Foot	636	6.7	New
Majority		8,256	86.6	+79.2
Turnout		9,528	20.8	−56.2
Labour hold		Swing		
