= John Edward Sutton =

British trades unionist and Labour Party politician

John Edward Sutton MP CH
- Sutton in 1923

Member of Parliament
- Preceded by: Edward Hopkinson
- Succeeded by: William Flanagan
- Constituency: Manchester East (Jan. 1910–1918); Manchester Clayton (February–November 1922; 1923–1931)

Personal details
- Born: 23 December 1862
- Died: 29 November 1945 (aged 82)
- Occupation: Trades Unionist

John Edward Sutton (23 December 1862 – 29 November 1945) was a British trades unionist and Labour Party politician.

At the age of 14, Sutton took up employment at Bradford Colliery, Manchester. He became a check-weighman and secretary of the Bradford branch of the Lancashire and Cheshire Miners' Federation. In 1894 he was elected to Manchester City Council as an Independent Labour Party councillor for the Bradford ward, an area previously represented by Conservatives.

At the general election of January 1910 Sutton was elected as Labour Member of Parliament (MP) for Manchester East, the constituency that included the Bradford area. He held the seat until its abolition in 1918.

At the 1918 general election Sutton stood in the new seat of Manchester Clayton, losing to the Conservative, Edward Hopkinson. Hopkinson died in 1922, forcing a by-election, and Sutton was selected as Labour candidate. The Coalition Government was very unpopular due to high unemployment and severe cutbacks recommended by the Geddes Report, and Sutton easily won the seat. He lost the seat at the 1922 general election but regained it in 1923, and held it until 1931 when a large swing to the Conservatives was reflected in Clayton. William Flanagan, Sutton's opponent in the 1922 by-election took the seat. Sutton did not contest another parliamentary election.

Parliament of the United Kingdom
Preceded by Thomas Gardner Horridge	Member of Parliament for Manchester East; 1910 – 1918	Constituency abolished
Preceded by Edward Hopkinson	Member of Parliament for Manchester Clayton; 1922 – 1922	Succeeded by William Flanagan
Preceded by William Flanagan	Member of Parliament for Manchester Clayton; 1923 – 1931	Succeeded by William Flanagan
