= John Jagger (MP) =

British trade unionist and Labour politician

John Jagger (1 October 1872 – 9 July 1942) was a British trade unionist and Labour Party politician. After a career in business and trade union leadership, he won a seat in the House of Commons in 1935, and held it until his death in a road accident.

== Career ==
Jagger spent the early part of his career in business, and travelled for four years as a business manager in India, China and Burma. He then became a departmental manager in co-operative stores.

He was chairman of the York Trades and Labour Council, and became president of the Amalgamated Union of Co-operative Employees, of which he was the chief founder. In 1921 he became general president of the National Union of Distributive and Allied Workers, and held that post until he entered Parliament in 1935.

At the 1935 general election, he was elected as the Member of Parliament (MP) for Manchester Clayton, defeating the Conservative MP William Flanagan. The seat had been won by Flanagan in 1931 after it had been held by Labour since 1922.

In December 1935 he was a speaker at the Congress of Peace and Friendship with Russia, held in Friends House on the Euston Road in London. In July 1936, he was one eleven MPs who sent a telegram to Prime Minister of Spain expressing their "admiration of the heroic fight being put up by the Spanish people against the attack of Fascists". The MPs pledged themselves "to do everything in our power to rally behind your struggle the whole British people".

In 1938, he was one of the Labour MPs who visited Spain during the Civil War. In May 1940, when Herbert Morrison became Minister of Supply in the wartime coalition government, Jagger was appointed as his Parliamentary Private Secretary (PPS). Morrison was promoted to Home Secretary in October 1940, and Jagger remained his PPS in the new post.

== Death ==
In July 1942, the 69-year-old Jagger had been staying in a cottage in Beaconsfield in Buckinghamshire. On 9 July he was riding his motorcycle to Beaconsfield railway station when he collided with a car, and was killed instantly. His death caused a by-election in Manchester Clayton, when the seat was held for Labour by Harry Thorneycroft.

== Family ==
Jagger married Martha Southern in 1899, and they had two sons.

Parliament of the United Kingdom
Preceded by William Flanagan	Member of Parliament for Manchester Clayton; 1935 – 1942	Succeeded by Harry Thorneycroft
Trade union offices
Preceded by Robert Bell Padley	President of the Amalgamated Union of Co-operative Employees; 1919–1921	Succeeded by Union merged
Preceded by New position	President of the National Union of Distributive and Allied Workers; 1921–1942	Succeeded by Percy Cottrell
