= Manchester East =

Parliamentary constituency in the United Kingdom, 1885–1918

- Former borough constituency for the House of Commons

1885–1918
- Created from: Manchester
- Replaced by: Manchester Ardwick and Manchester Clayton

Manchester East was one of six single-member parliamentary constituencies created in 1885 by the division of the existing three-member Parliamentary Borough of Manchester. The others were: Manchester South, Manchester North, Manchester North East, Manchester North West and Manchester South West. They were all abolished in 1918.

== Boundaries ==
The constituency was created by the Redistribution of Seats Act 1885, and was defined as consisting of the following areas:

- The Parish of Bradford,
- The Parish of Ardwick,
- The Parish of Beswick,
- The part of the Parish of Chorlton-upon-Medlock north of the centres of Cavendish Street, Grosvenor Street, Upper Brook Street, Dover Street, St. Leonards Street, and Cheltenham Street.

The next redistribution took place under the terms of the Representation of the People Act 1918. The Manchester East seat was divided between the two new constituencies of Manchester Ardwick and Manchester Clayton.

== Members of Parliament ==
Election	Member	Party
1885	Arthur Balfour	Conservative
1906	Thomas Horridge	Liberal
Jan. 1910	John Edward Sutton	Labour
1918	constituency abolished	

== Election results 1885-1918 ==
=== Elections in the 1880s ===
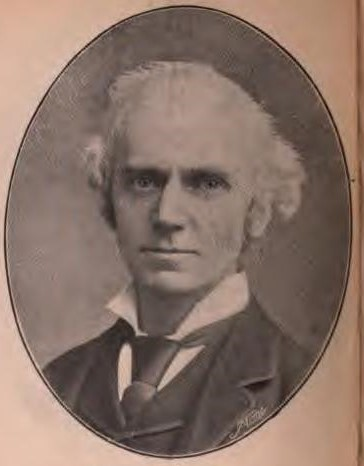
Hopkinson

General election 1885: Manchester East
Party	Candidate	Votes	%	±%
Conservative	Arthur Balfour	4,536	55.0	
Liberal	Alfred Hopkinson	3,712	45.0	
Majority		824	10.0	
Turnout		8,248	84.3	
Registered electors		9,779		
Conservative win (new seat)				

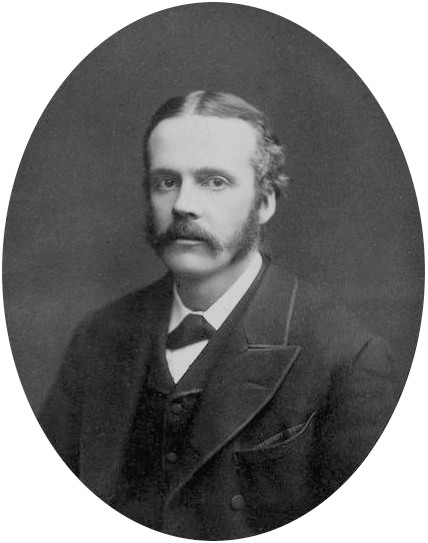
Balfour

General election 1886: Manchester East
Party	Candidate	Votes	%	±%
Conservative	Arthur Balfour	4,160	54.2	−0.8
Liberal	John Hattersley Crosfield	3,516	45.8	+0.8
Majority		644	8.4	−1.6
Turnout		7,676	78.5	−5.8
Registered electors		9,779		
Conservative hold		Swing	-0.8	

Balfour was appointed Secretary of State for Scotland, requiring a by-election.

By-election, 11 Aug 1886: Manchester East
Party	Candidate	Votes	%	±%
Conservative	Arthur Balfour	Unopposed		
Conservative hold				

=== Elections in the 1890s ===
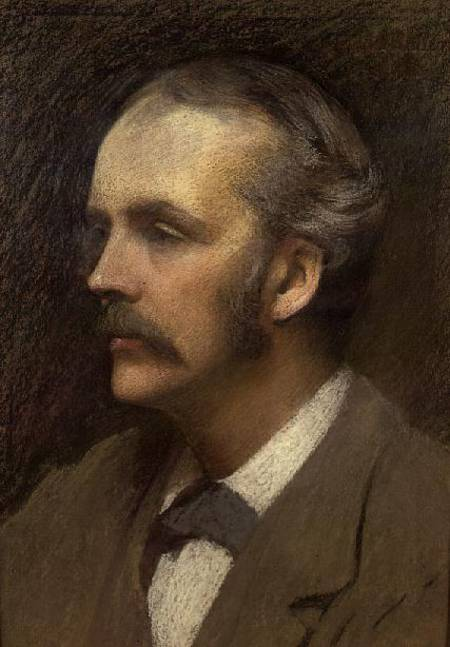
Balfour

General election 1892: Manchester East
Party	Candidate	Votes	%	±%
Conservative	Arthur Balfour	5,147	52.0	−2.2
Liberal	Joseph Edwin Crawford Munro	4,749	48.0	+2.2
Majority		398	4.0	−4.4
Turnout		9,896	86.7	+8.2
Registered electors		11,418		
Conservative hold		Swing	−2.2	

Balfour was appointed First Lord of the Treasury, requiring a by-election.

1895 Manchester East by-election
Party	Candidate	Votes	%	±%
Conservative	Arthur Balfour	Unopposed		
Conservative hold				

General election 1895: Manchester East
Party	Candidate	Votes	%	±%
Conservative	Arthur Balfour	5,386	53.9	+1.9
Liberal	Joseph Edwin Crawford Munro	4,610	46.1	−1.9
Majority		776	7.8	+3.8
Turnout		9,996	83.4	−3.3
Registered electors		11,991		
Conservative hold		Swing	+1.9	

=== Elections in the 1900s ===
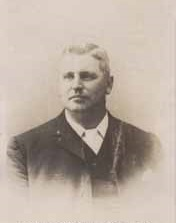
Scott

General election 1900: Manchester East
Party	Candidate	Votes	%	±%
Conservative	Arthur Balfour	5,803	63.4	+9.5
Liberal	Alfred Scott	3,350	36.6	−9.5
Majority		2,453	26.8	+19.0
Turnout		9,153	71.9	−11.5
Registered electors		12,727		
Conservative hold		Swing	+9.5	

Horridge

General election 1906: Manchester East
Party	Candidate	Votes	%	±%
Liberal	Thomas Horridge	6,403	59.1	+22.5
Conservative	Arthur Balfour	4,423	40.9	−22.5
Majority		1,980	18.2	N/A
Turnout		10,826	85.1	+13.2
Registered electors		12,724		
Liberal gain from Conservative		Swing	+22.5	

This was a notable result as Arthur Balfour had led the Conservative Party into the 1906 general election as leader. He therefore became the first leader of the opposition to lose his seat.

=== Elections in the 1910s ===
General election January 1910: Manchester East
Party	Candidate	Votes	%	±%
Labour	John Sutton	6,110	54.5	New
Conservative	Edward Elvy Robb	5,091	45.5	+4.6
Majority		1,019	9.0	N/A
Turnout		11,201	88.6	+3.5
Labour gain from Liberal		Swing		

General election December 1910: Manchester East
Party	Candidate	Votes	%	±%
Labour	John Sutton	5,524	54.3	−0.2
Conservative	Richard Gregory Proby	4,653	45.7	+0.2
Majority		871	8.6	−0.4
Turnout		10,177	80.5	−6.1
Labour hold		Swing	-0.2	

General Election 1914–15:

Another General Election was required to take place before the end of 1915. The political parties had been making preparations for an election to take place and by July 1914, the following candidates had been selected;

- Labour: John Sutton
- Unionist: Gerald Hurst

== Sources ==
Election results:

- https://web.archive.org/web/20060520143104/http://www.manchester.gov.uk/elections/archive/gen1900.htm
- https://web.archive.org/web/20060520143047/http://www.manchester.gov.uk/elections/archive/gen1945.htm

Horridge:

- List of Privy Counsellors (1936–1952)
- guardian.co.uk
- https://web.archive.org/web/20060211081205/http://www.aoqc42.dsl.pipex.com/majauto/autogra01.shtml

Sutton:

Parliament of the United Kingdom
Vacant since 1894 Title last held by Midlothian	Constituency represented by the prime minister 1902–1905	Succeeded by Stirling Burghs
