= Stack v. Boyle =

- Supreme Court of the United States

Argued October 18, 1951 Decided November 5, 1951
- Full case name: Loretta Starvus Stack, et al. v. James J. Boyle, United States Marshal
- Citations: 342 U.S. 1 (more) 72 S. Ct. 1; 96 L. Ed. 3

Holding
- Bail had been set unusually high for the defendants since there was no evidence that they would flee before the trial date, and was therefore in violation of their Eighth Amendment rights.

Court membership
- Chief Justice Fred M. Vinson Associate Justices Hugo Black · Stanley F. Reed; Felix Frankfurter · William O. Douglas; Robert H. Jackson · Harold H. Burton; Tom C. Clark · Sherman Minton

Case opinions
- Majority: Vinson, joined by Black, Reed, Frankfurter, Douglas, Jackson, Burton, Clark
- Concurrence: Jackson, joined by Frankfurter
- Minton took no part in the consideration or decision of the case.

Laws applied
- U.S. Const. Amend. VIII; Smith Act

Stack v. Boyle, 342 U.S. 1 (1951), was a United States Supreme Court case involving the arrest of members of the Communist Party who were charged with conspiring to violate the Smith Act. The case regards the Eighth Amendment issue of excessive bail.

The District Court had set bail at the fixed amount of $50,000 (roughly $500,000 in 2017) for each of the petitioners. This was an amount greater than that used with other serious crimes. The defendants moved to reduce bail, claiming that it was “excessive” under the Eighth Amendment. The defendants were detained in the custody of appellee, United States Marshal James J. Boyle.

== Overview ==
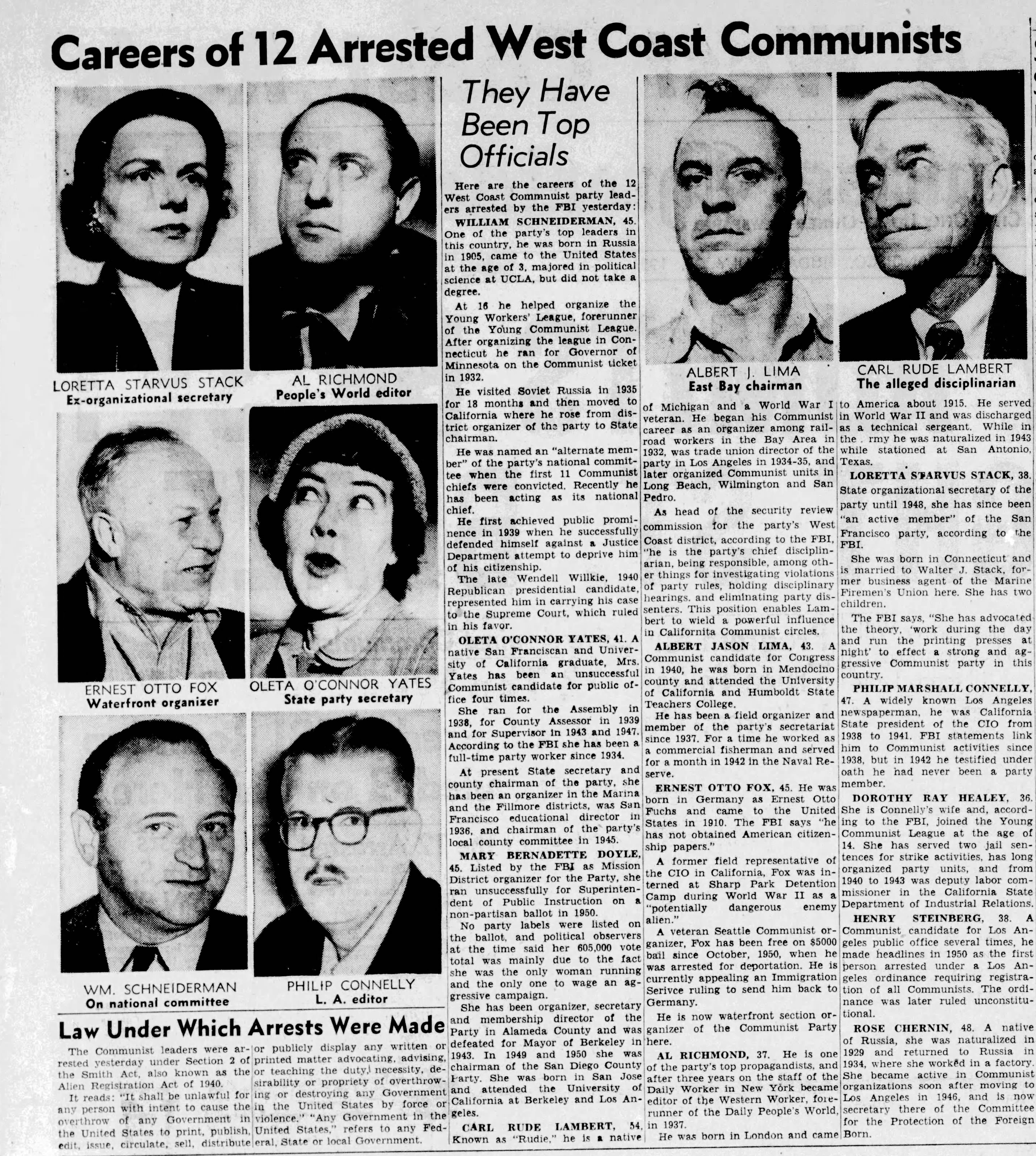
An article published in the San Francisco Chronicle profiling the 12 West Coast Communists arrested under the Smith Act, July 27, 1951

In 1951, 12 members of the Communist Party were arrested in the Southern District of California. Upon their arrest and on motion of the government to increase bail in the case of other petitioners, bail was fixed in the District Court for the Southern District of California at $50,000 for each person. The petitioners then moved to reduce bail under the Eighth Amendment, claiming that it was excessive. In support of their motion, petitioners submitted statements as to their financial resources, family relationships, health, prior criminal records, and other information. The only evidence offered by the government was a record showing that four persons previously convicted under the Smith Act in the Southern District of New York had forfeited bail. Their request was denied. The petitioners then filed the same issue under habeas corpus in the same 9th District Court, whereupon their petition was further dismissed. Finally, a request for certiorari was filed with the Supreme Court of the United States and granted.

== Historical context ==
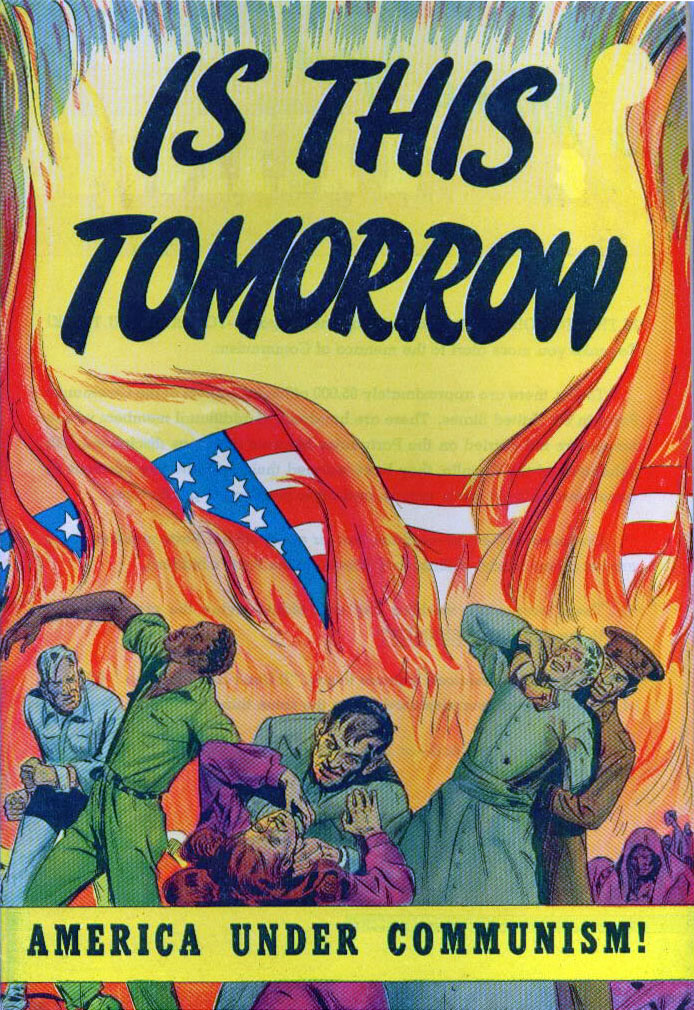
A typical anti-communist poster of the McCarthy era

In the 1950s the United States experienced what is known as the Second Red Scare which lasted roughly from the late 1940s to the late 1950s, during the height of the Cold War between the United States and the Soviet Union. During this period, Wisconsin Senator Joseph McCarthy led anti—communist investigations which included making accusations of disloyalty, subversion, or treason; thousands of citizens were accused of being Communists or Communist sympathizers and became the subject of unlawful investigations and questioning before government or private-industry panels, committees and agencies. The Smith Act, also known as the Alien Registration Act, was a 1940 act that set criminal penalties for “advocating the overthrow of the U.S. government” and required all non-citizen adult residents to register with the government.

== Defendants ==
=== Loretta Starvus Stack ===
A Connecticut native who moved to San Francisco after World War II, she worked as a waitress and bookkeeper. Stack was the party organizational secretary of the local Communist Party and was accused of inciting women to take up arms in support of Socialism. During the case hearing a witness testified that Stack learned to use a bayonet and won shooting prizes in Russia in 1932. After the Supreme Court ruling she left the Communist Party. In her later years she fought to improve bus service and organized a cooperative housing project.

=== Al Richmond ===
Al Richmond helped found The Daily People's World which was a leftist newspaper in San Francisco, and he served as its executive editor. Later, Richmond said of the anti-Communist campaign of Senator Joseph McCarthy, "I think that a lot of people were silenced, and their withdrawal from social commitment extended long afterward." Richmond left the party in 1968 after his paper criticized the Soviet Union for the invasion of Czechoslovakia, though he remained a Marxist. His autobiography, "A Long View From The Left," was published in 1973.

=== Dorothy Healey ===
Dorothy Healey began as a member of the Young Communist League and later the Communist Party. She was appointed a deputy labor commissioner by Governor Culbert Olson in 1940 and served as the Chairman of the Los Angeles Communist Party (1945). In 1952, she was arrested under the Smith Act. She appeared on college campuses in support of the antiwar movement in the 1960s, and in 1969, she openly opposed the Soviet invasion of Czechoslovakia in 1969; she effectively removed herself from the Communist Party because of this. Following her formal resignation in 1973, she became active in the New American Movement and the Democratic Socialists of America.

=== William Schneiderman ===
At age 16, William Schneiderman joined the Young Communist League and later became the chairman of the Communist Party of California for a quarter of a century. Suffering from chronic heart trouble, he stepped down as chairman of the California Communist Party in 1964. In 1982, Schneiderman wrote his autobiography, Dissent on Trial, chronicling his struggles as a lifelong political activist.

=== Rose Chernin Kusnitz ===
Rochele Chernin was born in 1901 in Chasnik, Russia. She was renamed Rose when she landed at Ellis Island in 1913. Chernin became executive secretary of the Committee for the Protection of the Foreign Born, which she founded in 1950. By 1957, the Supreme Court heard Yates v. United States, in which Rose Chernin was named. In a landmark decision, Chernin’s earlier conviction was overturned, which ruled the Smith Act unconstitutional.

=== Albert J. Lima ===
California leader of the Communist Party. He spoke at the University of California at Berkeley in 1963, ending the school's 13-year ban on Communist speakers. He ran unsuccessfully twice as a Communist candidate for the House of Representatives.

=== Other defendants ===
Philip Marshall Connelly, Ernest Otto Fox, Carl Rude Lambert, Henry Steinberg, Oleta O'Connor Yates, and Mary Bernadette Doyle were the remaining defendants.

== Issue ==
When bail for multiple defendants is set at a higher amount than is necessary to ensure their presence at trial, is this a violation of the Eighth Amendment?

== Court ruling ==
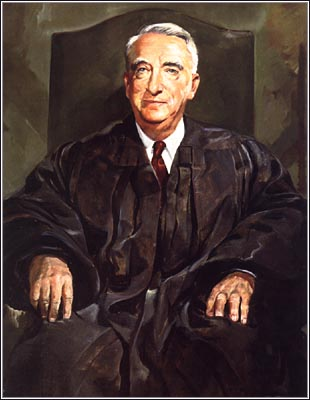
Supreme Court Chief Justice Fred M. Vinson

The U.S. Supreme Court found "that a defendant's bail cannot be set higher than an amount that is reasonably likely to ensure the defendant's presence at the trial.” It was determined that the $50,000 bail was excessive, given the lack of financial resources of the defendants and a lack of evidence that they were likely to flee before trial. Under the direction of Chief Justice Vinson, who delivered the opinion of the court, it was found that bail had “not been fixed by proper methods in this case.”

Chief Justice Vinson summed up the Constitutional issue by stating: “It is not denied that bail for each petitioner has been fixed in a sum much higher than that usually imposed for offenses with like penalties and yet there has been no factual showing to justify such action in this case...Such conduct would inject into our own system of government the very principles of totalitarianism which Congress was seeking to guard against in passing the statute under which petitioners have been indicted.”

Essentially, if a court sets an unusually high bail for multiple defendants, the court needs to have evidence regarding the situations of each defendant (whether they are considered a “flight risk”). Otherwise it is a violation of the Eighth Amendment.

== Significance ==
Bail law in the United States remained mostly unchanged until 1966. In 1966, the U.S. Congress passed the Bail Reform Act, which was designed to allow for the release of defendants with as little a financial strain as possible. President Lyndon B. Johnson gave a speech on the importance of the act, giving examples of how the bail system had harmed people in the past. “A man spent two months in jail before being acquitted. In that period, he lost his job, he lost his car, he lost his family -- it was split up. He did not find another job, following that, for four months.” The next major revision to U.S. bail law came with the Bail Reform Act of 1984, which replaced its 1966 predecessor. The Bail Reform Act of 1966 had helped stop discrimination against the poor, but left loopholes open that let many allegedly dangerous people receive bail as long as they did not appear to be flight risks. This new act allowed for defendants to be held until trial if they are judged dangerous to the community.

== See also ==
- Yates v. United States
- Smith Act trials of communist party leaders
