= Thomas Gardner Horridge =

British barrister and Liberal Party politician

Sir Thomas Gardner Horridge PC
- Sir Thomas Gardner Horridge (unknown date; published 1910)

High Court Judge King's Bench Division
- In office 1910 – 27 May 1937
- Monarchs: Edward VII (1910); George V (1910–1936); Edward VIII (1936); George VI (1936–1937)

Member of Parliament for Manchester East
- In office 1906–1910
- Preceded by: Arthur Balfour
- Succeeded by: John Edward Sutton

Personal details
- Born: 12 October 1857
- Died: 25 July 1938 (aged 80)
- Party: Liberal
- Spouse: Evelyne Sandys (m. 1901; died 1920) May Ethel Markham (m. 1921)
- Occupation: Solicitor; Judge

Sir Thomas Gardner Horridge (12 October 1857 – 25 July 1938) was a British barrister and Liberal Party politician who became a judge of the High Court of England and Wales.

== Biography ==
Horridge was the only son of John Horridge, chemist, of Tonge with Haulgh, and Margaret Barlow of Bolton, Lancashire. He was educated in Barnes, Surrey before becoming a solicitor in Southport in 1879. In 1884, he was called to the bar at the Middle Temple, serving in the Northern Circuit. In January 1901, it was announced that Horridge was to be appointed a queen's counsel. With Victoria's death, the warrant was issued by her successor, Edward VII, and he became a king's counsel.

In 1906, he was elected as the Liberal member of parliament for Manchester East, spectacularly unseating the former Conservative Prime Minister, Arthur Balfour. He particularly campaigned on the "Chinese Slavery" issue: the Conservative government's policy of using indentured Chinese labourers, housed in primitive enclosures, to operate South African gold mines.

Horridge stood down at the next general election in January 1910, and resumed his legal career. He was promptly appointed a judge of the King's Bench Division, a decision that was criticised as political at the time. He subsequently dealt with cases in the Divorce and Bankruptcy Courts, and also took part in the trial for treason of Roger Casement. He was elected treasurer of the Middle Temple in 1929.

In 1937, he announced his resignation from the bench, aged 79. He was appointed a member of the Privy Council upon his retirement. He died at his home in Hove, Sussex in 1938, aged 80.

Horridge was married twice. In 1901, he married Evelyne Sandys of Lanarth, Cornwall, who died in 1920. In 1921, he married May Ethel Markham, widow of Alfred Isenberg. There were no children from either marriage.

Parliament of the United Kingdom
Preceded by Arthur James Balfour	Member of Parliament for Manchester East; 1906–January 1910	Succeeded by John Edward Sutton
