= William Johnson (trade unionist) =

- Born: 1866; Bingley
- Died: Unknown
- Occupation: Trade unionist

William Johnson (born 1866) was a British trade unionist and socialist activist.

Born in Bingley, then in the West Riding of Yorkshire, Johnson worked on a farm until 1882, when he emigrated to the United States. He undertook various jobs there, and joined the Knights of Labour during a lock out. He became increasingly active in the union, serving as a representative for worsted mill workers.

In 1888, Johnson returned to the UK, becoming a shop assistant, and in 1889 he joined the East London Shop Assistants Union. He became its honorary secretary the following year, and took it into a merger which formed the National Union of Shop Assistants in 1891, becoming its full-time general secretary. While leader, he launched a journal, Shop Life Reform.

Johnson was a member of the Fabian Society, on its radical wing, and unusually proposed in 1892 that Liberal Party officials should be ineligible for membership of the organisation. He was also a supporter of The Clarion, and was one of seven people present at a meeting at its office in 1892, when it was proposed that an independent labour party be formed. In 1893, this was established as the Independent Labour Party; Johnson served as secretary to the standing orders committee at is founding conference, and served on its first National Administrative Committee. He stood to become the first general secretary of the party, but was defeated by Shaw Maxwell, 66 votes to 28.

Later in 1893, Johnson moved to London. The following year, he resigned his trade union post to become secretary of the Democratic Club, in succession to Shaw Maxwell. However, Shaw Maxwell soon returned to the post, and Johnson became treasurer of the Shop Assistants' Union, later serving a term as president. He also represented the union at the Trades Union Congress, the first shop assistant to attend one of its meetings.

Trade union offices
Preceded by New position	General Secretary of the National Amalgamated Union of Shop Assistants, Warehousemen and Clerks; 1891–1894	Succeeded by James Macpherson
