= Schneiderman v. United States =

- Supreme Court of the United States

Argued November 9, 1942 Reargued March 12, 1943 Decided June 21, 1943
- Full case name: William Schneiderman v. United States
- Citations: 320 U.S. 118 (more)

Case history
- Prior: Certificate of naturalization voided, 33 F. Supp. 510 (N.D. Cal. 1940), aff'd, 119 F.2d 500 (9th Cir. 1941); cert. granted, 314 U.S. 597

Holding
- The government did not adequately show that Schneiderman was "not attached to the principles of the Constitution". Reversed and remanded.

Court membership
- Chief Justice Harlan F. Stone Associate Justices Owen Roberts · Hugo Black; Stanley F. Reed · Felix Frankfurter; William O. Douglas · Frank Murphy; Robert H. Jackson · Wiley B. Rutledge

Case opinions
- Majority: Murphy, joined by Black, Reed, Douglas, Rutledge
- Concurrence: Douglas
- Concurrence: Rutledge
- Dissent: Stone, joined by Roberts, Frankfurter
- Jackson took no part in the consideration or decision of the case.

Laws applied
- Sections 4 and 15 of the Naturalization Act of 1906

Schneiderman v. United States, 320 U.S. 118 (1943), was a United States Supreme Court case involving denaturalization. By a 5–3 vote, the justices rejected the federal government's attempt to denaturalize William Schneiderman, a self-avowed communist. The Court held that "clear, unequivocal, and convincing" proof was required to revoke citizenship; it determined that there was insufficient evidence that Schneiderman was not "attached to the principles of the Constitution" as required by federal law.

== Background ==
William Schneiderman was born in Russia in 1905; he immigrated to the United States with his parents at age two. A member of communist groups throughout his early years, he joined the Worker's Party (which later became the Communist Party of the United States) in 1924. In 1927, Schneiderman became a naturalized citizen. He had never been charged with a crime, nor had there been any assertions of unlawful behavior on his part. Schneiderman remained committed to communism throughout the period, and in 1932 he ran on the Communist Party ticket for governor of Minnesota. In 1939, the federal government commenced denaturalization proceedings against him, arguing that his citizenship had been illegally procured because, as a communist, Schneiderman had not been "attached to the principles of the Constitution of the United States", as required by the Naturalization Act of 1906. A California federal court agreed and denaturalized Schneiderman. The court found that he supported communist principles, such as the abolition of private property, that were inherently contrary to the Constitution; it also concluded that he supported the use of "methods of force and violence" to carry out those goals. On appeal, the Court of Appeals for the Ninth Circuit affirmed, listing the Communist Party's beliefs and asserting that "[i]t is obvious that these views are not those of our Constitution".

Schneiderman appealed the case to the Supreme Court of the United States, which heard the case on November 9, 1942. He was represented pro bono by Wendell Willkie, a previous Republican candidate for president; Solicitor General Charles Fahy argued on behalf of the government. The case was initially heard by only seven justices: one seat was vacant and Justice Robert H. Jackson was recused due to his previous service as Attorney General. After Wiley Rutledge was appointed to fill the vacant seat, the Court reheard the case to enable him to participate.

== Decision ==
=== Majority opinion ===
Justice Frank Murphy delivered the opinion of the Court, which was joined by Justices Black, Reed, Douglas, and Rutledge, on June 21, 1943. Disagreeing with the government's arguments, the Court reversed the lower courts' rulings. Murphy reasoned that one could be attached to the Constitution's principles without agreeing with each one of its provisions. Citing the First Amendment's free-expression protections and Article V's constitutional-amendment process, he wrote that "[t]he constitutional fathers, fresh from a revolution, did not forge a political straight-jacket for the generations to come....As Justice Holmes said, 'Surely it cannot show lack of attachment to the principles of the Constitution that [one] thinks it can be improved.'" Next, the justices rejected the Justice Department's contention that Schneiderman's membership in the Communist Party meant that he supported overthrowing the government by force. Discussing in detail the writings of various communist leaders, Murphy determined that the Communist Party did not unequivocally favor actual violence against the government. Finally, the Court determined that, in light of the First Amendment, "clear, unequivocal, and convincing" proof was necessary to denaturalize a citizen. Murphy determined that, in Schneiderman's case, the government had not met that high standard of proof.

=== Concurrences ===
Two justices filed concurring opinions: Justices Douglas and Rutledge. Douglas argued that naturalization should only be revoked on illegal-procurement grounds in cases in which no finding of attachment had been made in the first place, not in cases in which "another judge would appraise the evidence differently". Rutledge expressed concern that the government was attempting to revoke Schneiderman's citizenship so long after his naturalization. According to Rutledge, "no citizen with such a threat hanging over his head could be free".

=== Dissent ===
In an opinion joined by Justices Roberts and Frankfurter, Chief Justice Harlan F. Stone stridently dissented. He argued that the majority failed to give adequate deference to the district court's factual findings. Although Stone accepted arguendo Murphy's "clear, unequivocal, and convincing" standard, he concluded that the government had met it. In Stone's view, the record showed that Schneiderman was "well aware that he was a member of and aiding a party which taught and advocated the overthrow of the Government of the United States by force and violence."

== Impact and legacy ==
The decision attracted immediate contemporary attention. Major newspapers took various views of the ruling: the St. Louis Star-Times praised it as "a triumph for American principles of freedom and justice", while The Philadelphia Inquirer criticized "its weakening effect on the safeguards which the Government seeks to establish against subversive elements". The perspectives presented in law reviews were generally hostile to the Court's decision. In later years, the ruling had a substantial impact on the law. Its high burden of proof reduced the number of denaturalization cases, while its rejection of "guilt by association" was cited in later cases involving the Communist Party. Schneiderman himself, meanwhile, had not seen the last of the Supreme Court: after being convicted in 1952 of conspiracy to violate the Smith Act, the Court again ruled in his favor in the influential case of Yates v. United States.

== See also ==
- American Committee for the Protection of Foreign Born
- Bridges v. Wixon
- Turner v. Williams
