= John Turner (anarchist) =

English anarchist

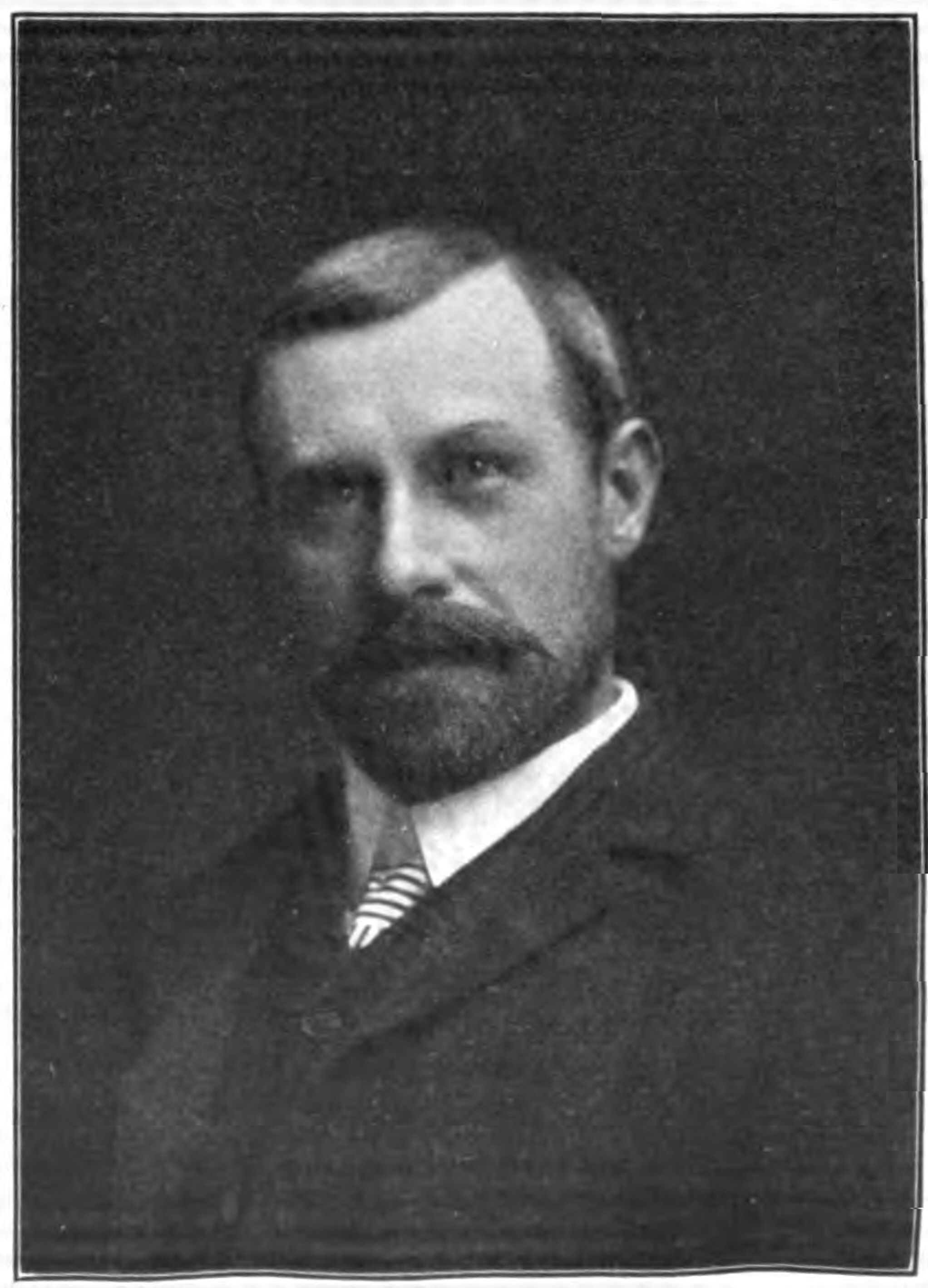
- Turner ca. 1900
- Born: 24 August 1864; Near Braintree, Essex, England
- Died: 9 August 1934 (aged 68); Brighton, Sussex, England
- Movement: Anarchist movement, labour movement

John Turner (24 August 1864 – 9 August 1934) was an English-born anarchist shop steward. He referred to himself as "of semi-Quaker descent." Turner achieved the distinction of becoming the first person to be sentenced to deportation from the United States for violating the terms of its 1903 Anarchist Exclusion Act.

== Early activism ==
Turner was a member of the Socialist League. However, he left it to become a member of the Freedom anarchist group. Then he founded the Shop Assistants' Union and became its general secretary. At one point the union tried to nominate Turner for Parliament. However, he declined because he preferred not to "waste his time in parliamentary debates".

== Speaking tours in the United States ==
In 1896 Turner visited the United States, where he spent seven months lecturing throughout the country, during which time he met Voltairine de Cleyre, the American anarchist, feminist writer and public speaker. He returned in October 1903, seven months after the enactment of the Anarchist Exclusion Act, which barred anyone from entering the country who held anarchist views. Consequently Turner was arrested, on 23 October, after he gave a lecture at the Murray Hill Lyceum in Manhattan, New York, and was charged with inciting and promoting anarchy. When he was searched, immigration officials found a copy of Johann Most's Free Society and Turner's speaking schedule, which included a memorial to the Haymarket Martyrs.

Turner's belongings were sufficient to order his deportation. Consequently, he was held in detention at Ellis Island for three months awaiting appeal of his case to the US Supreme Court. Before the final ruling, Turner was released on US$5,000 bail. He then proceeded to give lectures around the country, wrongly speculating that the Supreme Court would declare the law unconstitutional The Supreme Court declared the law constitutional, which resulted in Turner becoming the first person to be ordered to be deported from the United States for violation of the 1903 Anarchist Exclusion Act. However, he returned to England before the judgment could be implemented.

== Return to England ==
Upon Turner's return to England, he worked on Freedom and several other publications. He was a member of the collective that published Commonweal. And he was the editor of Freedom's syndicalist journal The Voice of Labour, which denounced the 'blight of respectability' of mainstream labour unions. The paper began as a weekly in 1907 and advocated direct action and the general strike.

In May 1920, after the Russian Revolution, Turner travelled to Russia as part of the British Labour Delegation. While he was there he tried to help Aron Baron, the Jewish Ukrainian anarchist revolutionary, obtain a reprieve from a death sentence. Baron was subsequently charged with having 'aroused public sentiment abroad against his imprisonment in the Solovietzki and having induced revolutionists visiting Russia to seek his release'. Baron was then sent to a prison in Siberia.

Throughout the many changes in the history of Freedom, Turner was its publisher from when it was renamed Freedom: A Journal of Libertarian Thought, Work and Literature in 1930 to his death in 1934.

== Notes ==
Trade union offices
Preceded by James Macpherson	General Secretary of the National Amalgamated Union of Shop Assistants, Warehousemen and Clerks; 1912 – 1924	Succeeded by John Leslie
Preceded by New position	Food, Drink, etc. Group representative on the General Council of the TUC; 1921 – 1925	Succeeded by John Leslie
Media offices
Preceded by Thomas Keell	Editor of Freedom; 1930–1934	Succeeded by Marie-Louise Berneri & Vernon Richards
