= 1922 Manchester Clayton by-election =

UK parliamentary by-election

- 18 February 1922

Candidate	Sutton	Flanagan
Party	Labour	Unionist
Popular vote	14,662	11,038
Percentage	57.05%	42.94%
MP before election
Hopkinson
Unionist
Subsequent MP
Sutton
Labour

The 1922 Manchester Clayton by-election of 18 February 1922 was held after the death of the Conservative politician and Member of Parliament (MP) Edward Hopkinson. Labour took the seat in the by-election.

== Candidates ==
- William Henry Flanagan was the Conservative and Unionist candidate and was a Wadding and Wool Merchant.
- John Edward Sutton was the Labour candidate and was a trade union official.

== Result ==
Manchester Clayton by-election, 1922
Party	Candidate	Votes	%	±%
Labour	John Edward Sutton	14,662	57.05	
Unionist	William Henry Flanagan	11,038	42.94	
Majority		3,624	14.11	N/A
Turnout		25,700	73.7	+16.2
Labour gain from Unionist		Swing	+18.7	

== See also ==
- List of United Kingdom by-elections (1918–1931)
