= Bridges v. Wixon =

- Supreme Court of the United States

Argued April 2–3, 1945 Decided June 18, 1945
- Full case name: Bridges v. Wixon, District Director, Immigration and Naturalization Service, Department of Justice
- Citations: 326 U.S. 135 (more)

Holding
- Deportation proceedings against non-citizens lawfully resident in the United States must adhere to the Due Process Clause guarantees of the Fifth and Fourtheenth amendments.

Court membership
- Chief Justice Harlan F. Stone Associate Justices Owen Roberts · Hugo Black; Stanley F. Reed · Felix Frankfurter; William O. Douglas · Frank Murphy; Robert H. Jackson · Wiley B. Rutledge

Case opinions
- Majority: Douglas, joined by Black, Murphy, Reed, Rutledge
- Dissent: Stone, joined by Frankfurter, Roberts
- Jackson took no part in the consideration or decision of the case.

Laws applied
- U.S. Const. amends. V, U.S. Const. amends. XIV

Bridges v. Wixon, 326 U.S. 135 (1945), was a decision of the U.S. Supreme Court in which the Court ruled that deportation proceedings against non-citizens lawfully resident in the United States must adhere to norms of due process. It further held that penalties for "affiliation" with a proscribed organization under the Smith Act require concrete proof of meaningful and ongoing association with the organization beyond casual cooperation or ideological affinity.

Portions of Frank Murphy's concurrence, which invoked First Amendment issues, have been frequently quoted.

== Background ==
Harry Bridges was a citizen of Australia legally resident in the United States. A merchant mariner by trade, he became a leading organizer of both the Industrial Workers of the World and the International Longshoremen’s Association (ILA). Business interests in the West Coast shipping industry suspected Bridges of being a communist; Communist Party USA (CPUSA) officers had previously strongly implied the ILA was coordinating its actions with the party, there were known party members among its membership, and Bridges himself adhered to what was generally perceived to be the Soviet Communist party line such as publicly supporting the Soviet invasion of Poland and the Molotov–Ribbentrop Pact. Two former CPUSA members — John Leech and Arthur Kent — even alleged Bridges had been secretly elected to the party's central committee under the nom de guerre "Rossi". Nonetheless, he publicly disclaimed formal party membership.

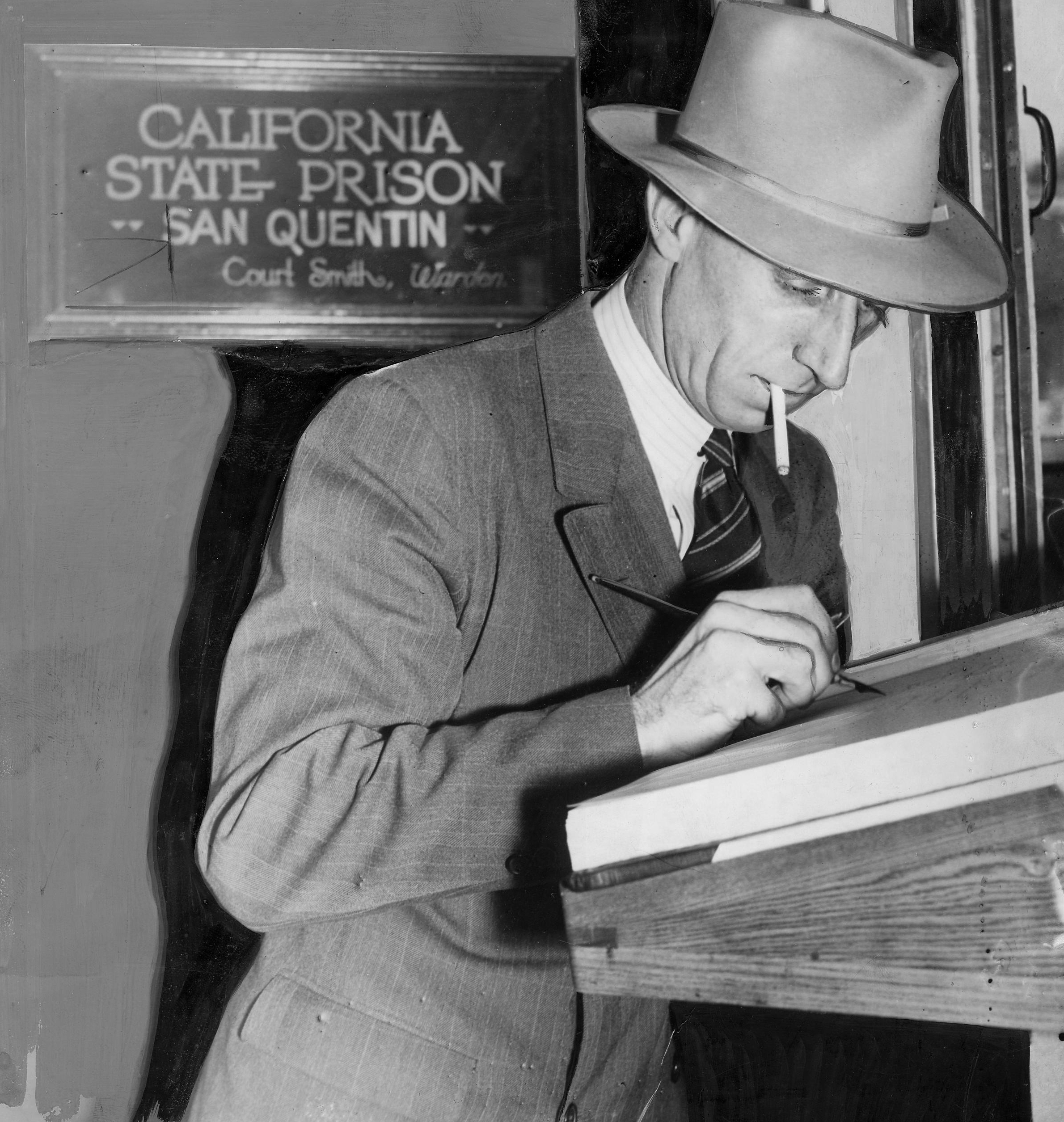
Harry Bridges signs the register at San Quentin State Prison, August 25, 1939

In 1939, the United States Government initiated deportation proceedings against Bridges, alleging he was a communist. The attempt failed due to a lack of evidence that Bridges had ever held formal membership in the Communist Party. In 1940, the United States Congress passed the Smith Act, which — among other things — allowed the deportation of an alien on the basis of their affiliation with an organization advocating the overthrow of the United States Government. The following year, in 1941, United States Attorney General Francis Biddle personally ordered the deportation of Bridges, this time charging him with violating the Smith Act through notice of his labor advocacy which strongly suggested communist affiliation, even if there was no direct evidence of party membership. Bridges' administrative appeal of the deportation order to the Board of Immigration Appeals failed.

Bridges sought release from the custody of the Immigration and Naturalization Service (INS) by habeas corpus petition to the United States District Court for the Northern District of California, which was denied. Bridges unsuccessfully appealed to the United States Court of Appeals for the Ninth Circuit.

== Opinion of the court ==
The United States Supreme Court heard Bridges' final appeal for a petition for a writ of certiorari from April 2-3, 1945.

The court, in a 5-3 ruling, determined Bridges' due process rights had been violated, finding that those who investigated Bridges relied on hearsay and other unreliable evidence against him. The majority opinion, written by William O. Douglas, stopped short of asserting a First Amendment violation by the government, instead noting that the government had failed to take "meticulous care" in deportation, which must be observed so as to meet the "essential standards of fairness".

According to the majority opinion, penalties for "affiliation" with a proscribed organization under the Smith Act also required concrete proof of meaningful and ongoing association with the organization beyond casual cooperation or ideological affinity.

=== Murphy's concurring opinion ===
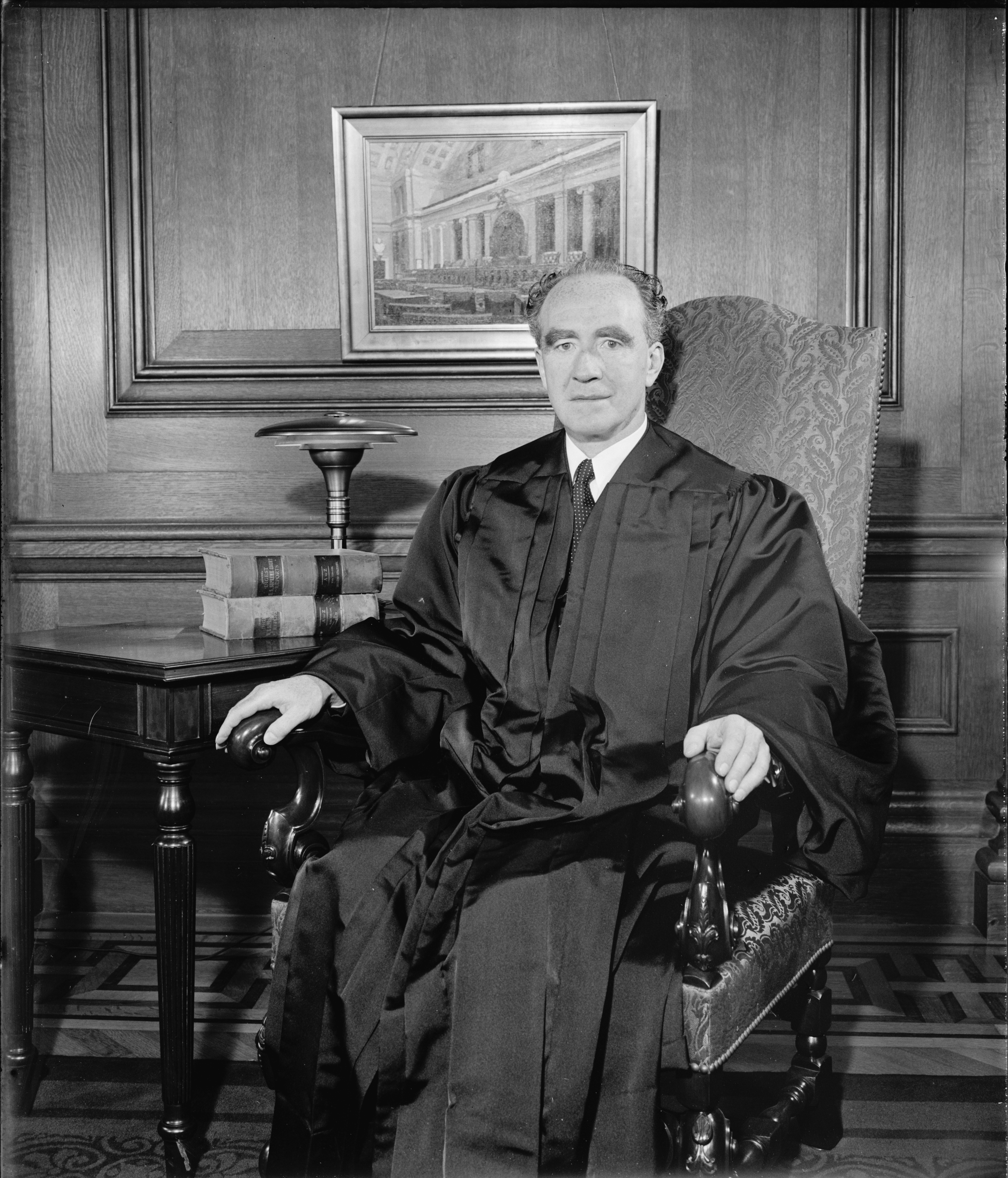
By invoking the First Amendment, Francis Murphy's (pictured) concurrence went further than Douglas' majority opinion.

Francis W. Murphy's concurrence, which went further than the majority was willing to go, has been frequently quoted.

Murphy joined the majority, but grounded his separate concurrence in the First Amendment, writing that, while the government can exclude non-citizens from entering the United States based on undesirable speech, once an alien had lawfully entered, he could not be removed for reasons of speech alone. According to Murphy's concurring opinion:

The Bill of Rights is a futile authority for the alien seeking admission for the first time to these shores. But, once an alien lawfully enters and resides in this country, he becomes invested with the rights guaranteed by the Constitution to all people within our borders. Such rights include those protected by the First and the Fifth Amendments and by the due process clause of the Fourteenth Amendment. None of these provisions acknowledges any distinction between citizens and resident aliens.

Murphy continued by writing:

The record in this case will stand forever as a monument to man's intolerance of man. Seldom if ever in the history of this nation has there been such a concentrated and relentless crusade to deport an individual because he dared to exercise the freedom that belongs to him as a human being and that is guaranteed to him by the Constitution.

Murphy also argued that deportation of Bridges would be further illicit as it relied on “guilt by association” instead of “personal guilt.”

=== Stone's dissent ===
The dissent was written by Justice Harlan Fiske Stone who deferred to Congress' "plenary power" over immigration and deportation.

== Aftermath ==
On September 17, 1945, three months following the Supreme Court's decision, Bridges became a United States citizen.

During the rest of his life, Bridges continued to hew closely in support of the Soviet Union, such as denouncing the Polish Solidarity movement. Nonetheless, until his death in 1990, he consistently disavowed any actual membership in CPUSA. Following the breakup of the Soviet Union, researchers discovered a 1937 Comintern file in Kremlin archives containing a list of CPUSA officers that included the entry "ROSSI (Bridges)—C.P. USA Central Committee member. President of the Dockers and Port Warehouse Workers' Union".

The Smith Act remained law, and the Supreme Court's decision provoked the House Unamerican Activities Committee. The American Committee for the Protection of Foreign Born (ACPFB) was already being targeted after successfully preventing the deportation of Bridges. They continued to challenge the McCarran Act but lost funding because HUAC considered them a subversive organization and ordered them to register with the Subversive Activities Control Board (SACB) as a Communist-front organization. ACPFB resisted, and the SACB vacated the registration order after the U.S. Supreme Court ruled it was unconstitutional, but the damage was done, and ACPFB was severely impeded in funding legal challenges to deportations and denaturalizations despite their initial success in the Bridges and Schneiderman v. United States decisions.

== See also ==
- Detention of Mahmoud Khalil
- Due Process Clause § Scope
- Harisiades v. Shaughnessy (1952) similar case involving the Smith Act and deportation of lawful permanent residents for Communist affiliations
- American Committee for the Protection of Foreign Born
