= Joseph Hallsworth =

British trade union leader

Sir Joseph Hallsworth (2 December 1884 – 19 July 1974) was a British trade union leader.

== Biography ==
Born in Audenshaw, near Manchester, Hallsworth began working in 1902 as a clerk for the Amalgamated Union of Co-operative Employees. He soon became the union's assistant secretary, and also became active in the Labour Party, standing unsuccessfully for Stretford at the 1918 general election. He became the union's secretary in 1916, then when this merged to form the National Union of Distributive and Allied Workers (NUDAW), he was appointed Secretary-General of the new organisation.

In 1926, Hallsworth was first elected to the General Council of the Trades Union Congress (TUC), and he served as President of the TUC in 1939. He served on a large number of bodies, including the International Labour Organization and the Central Price Regulation Committee during World War II, and as President of the International Federation of Commercial, Clerical, and Technical Employees. In 1947, NUDAW merged to form the Union of Shop, Distributive and Allied Workers, and Hallsworth was its first Secretary-General, serving for two years. He was knighted in 1946, and stood down from various government committees in 1947, although he joined the National Coal Board. On retirement, he served as Chairman of the North Western Electricity Board, standing down in 1955.

Trade union offices
Preceded by Alfred Hewitt	Secretary of the Amalgamated Union of Co-operative Employees; 1916–1921	Succeeded by Position abolished
Preceded by New position	Secretary-General of the National Union of Distributive and Allied Workers; 1921–1947	Succeeded by Position abolished
Preceded by John Leslie	Food, Drink, etc. Group representative on the General Council of the TUC; 1926–1947	Succeeded by A. W. Burrows
Preceded by Otto Urban	President of the International Federation of Commercial, Clerical and Technical Employees; 1933–1947	Succeeded by Oreste Capocci
Preceded by New position	General Secretary of the Union of Shop, Distributive and Allied Workers; 1947–1949	Succeeded by Alan Birch
Preceded by Herbert Elvin	President of the Trades Union Congress; 1939	Succeeded by Bill Holmes
