= National Amalgamated Union of Shop Assistants, Warehousemen and Clerks =

Shop Assistants' Union
- National Amalgamated Union of Shop Assistants, Warehousemen and Clerks
- Predecessor: East London Shop Assistants' Union; Warehouse Assistants' Union
- Merged into: Union of Shop, Distributive and Allied Workers
- Founded: 1891
- Dissolved: 1946
- Headquarters: Dilke House, Malet Street, London
- Location: United Kingdom
- Members: 53,403 (1946)
- Publication: Shop Assistant
- Affiliations: TUC, ITUC, Labour

The National Amalgamated Union of Shop Assistants, Warehousemen and Clerks (NAUSAWC, often known as the Shop Assistants' Union) was a trade union representing retail workers in the United Kingdom.

The union was founded in 1891 with the merger of the East London Shop Assistants' Union and the Warehouse Assistants' Union. Based in Manchester, it was originally named the National Union of Shop Assistants, and the following year, 1893 it became the National Union of Shop Assistants, Warehousemen and Clerks. Its membership grew rapidly, from just under 1,300 in 1893 to more than 7,500 in 1900. During this period, it relocated its headquarters to London, merged in 1898 with the United Shop Assistants Union, and adopted its final name.

In 1910, the union had more than 21,000 members, including 3,000 women, and was the second largest union of retail workers, after the Amalgamated Union of Co-operative Employees. It continued to expand, merging with the National Association of Grocers Assistants in 1920 and the Dental Assistants Union in 1921. It built up a branch in Dublin, but this left in 1921 to merge with the Irish Drapers' Assistants Association, forming the Irish Union of Distributive Workers and Clerks.

In 1946, the union merged with the National Union of Distributive and Allied Workers to form the Union of Shop, Distributive and Allied Workers.

Notable figures associated with the union include assistant general secretary Margaret Bondfield, and president James Seddon.

== Election results ==
The union sponsored Labour Party candidates in several Parliamentary elections, many of whom won election.

Election	Constituency	Candidate	Votes	Percentage	Position
1906 general election	Gravesend	James Macpherson	873	16.2	3
1906 general election	Newton	James Seddon	6,434	52.2	1
1910 Jan general election	Newton	James Seddon	7,256	52.7	1
1910 Dec general election	Newton	James Seddon	6,562	49.5	2
1922 general election	South East Essex	Philip Hoffman	11,459	45.9	2
1923 general election	South East Essex	Philip Hoffman	13,979	53.0	1
1924 general election	South East Essex	Philip Hoffman	13,820	41.2	2
1929 general election	Sheffield Central	Philip Hoffman	19,183	59.1	1
1931 general election	Sheffield Central	Philip Hoffman	13,212	38.0	2
1935 general election	Sedgefield	John Leslie	20,375	52.3	1
1935 general election	Sheffield Central	Philip Hoffman	13,408	49.2	2
1945 general election	Sedgefield	John Leslie	27,051	63.8	1

== General secretaries ==
1891: William Johnson
1894: James Macpherson
1912: John Turner
1924: John Leslie
1936: G. Maurice Hann
