= Anarchist Exclusion Act of 1903 =

United States federal law

- Other short titles: Immigration Act of 1903
- Long title: An Act To regulate the immigration of aliens into the United States
- Nicknames: Anarchist Exclusion Act
- Enacted by: the 57th United States Congress
- Effective: March 3, 1903

Citations
- Public law: Pub. L. 57–162
- Statutes at Large: 32 Stat. 1213

Legislative history
- Introduced in the House as H.R. 12199 by Boies Penrose (R–PA) on December 8, 1902; Passed the House on March 2, 1903 (153-101); Passed the Senate on March 2, 1903 (Passed); Reported by the joint conference committee on March 2, 1903; agreed to by the House on March 3, 1903 (194-11) and by the Senate on March 3, 1903 (Agreed); Signed into law by President Theodore Roosevelt on March 3, 1903

The Anarchist Exclusion Act, or the Immigration Act of 1903, was a law of the United States regulating immigration. It codified previous immigration law, and added four inadmissible classes: anarchists, people with epilepsy, beggars, and importers of prostitutes. It had minimal impact and its provisions related to anarchists were expanded in the Immigration Act of 1918.

== Background ==
Anarchism came to public attention in the United States with the Haymarket Affair of 1886. On May 4, a policeman was killed and several others were wounded, of which six later died, after a bomb exploded in Chicago's Haymarket Square. Eight members of the recently formed International Working People's Association (IWPA) were found guilty of the bombing despite 6 of them not being physically present. The IWPA's 1883 manifesto called for the "destruction of the existing class rule, by all means, i.e., by energetic, relentless, revolutionary and international action".

The idea of excluding anarchists from immigrating was first mentioned at a Congressional hearing in 1889. A bill introduced on July 20, 1894, sought to restrict the entry of anarchists by requiring potential immigrants to visit a U. S. consulate for a political review before immigrating. A substitute bill proposed a system within the United States to detect, question, and deport immigrants accused of anarchism. Both died in committee.

On September 6, 1901, Leon F. Czolgosz, an American-born son of Polish immigrants and a self-proclaimed anarchist, assassinated President William McKinley. The police responded by arresting a number of anarchists, including Emma Goldman and a group of Chicago anarchists that published Free Society, the leading English-language communist-anarchist periodical in the US at the time. They were all later released because no evidence of conspiracy could be found. Also, there were some viewpoints in the anarchist opinion that strongly denounced Czolgosz, with some calling him a "dangerous crank," despite what was to come next.

Theodore Roosevelt urged the exclusion and deportation of anarchist immigrants in his first address to Congress on December 3, 1901:

I earnestly recommend to the congress that in the exercise of its wise discretion it should take into consideration the coming to this country of anarchists or persons professing principles hostile to all government ... They and those like them should be kept out of this country; and if found here they should be promptly deported to the country whence they came.

== Legislation ==
President Theodore Roosevelt signed the Act, officially "An Act To regulate the immigration of aliens into the United States, x ch. 1012, 32 Stat. 1222, into law on March 3, 1903, the last day of the 57th United States Congress. It codified previous immigration law and added four inadmissible classes: anarchists, people with epilepsy, beggars, and importers of prostitutes. It also allowed for the deportation within two years of anyone unlawfully in the country and raised the head tax on immigrants to the United States to $2.00. It further allowed the deportation of immigrants who became a public charge within their first two years in the country.

It was the first legislation in the US since the Alien and Sedition Acts of 1798 that called for questioning potential immigrants about their political beliefs. The Act barred anyone "who disbelieves in or who is opposed to all organized government, or who is a member of or affiliated with any organization entertaining or teaching such disbelief in or opposition to all organized government." The law also limited the deportation of non-citizen anarchists to the first three years of their residency in the US.

== Enforcement ==
The impact of the law was slight. The Commissioner-General of Immigration reported that from the time the law took effect in 1903 to June 30, 1914, a total of 15 anarchists were denied entry to the US. He reported that four anarchists had been expelled in 1913 and three in 1914.

In October 1903, immediately following a speech given by the British anarchist John Turner at the Murray Hill Lyceum in New York, Bureau of Immigration officials arrested him and found a copy of Johann Most's Free Society and Turner's speaking schedule, which included a memorial to the Haymarket Martyrs. That was enough evidence to order his deportation. Emma Goldman organized a Free Speech League to contest the deportation. She recruited Clarence Darrow and Edgar Lee Masters to defend him. After Goldman organized a meeting at Cooper Union of those opposing the deportation, a New York Times editorial argued in favor of the Act and the deportation of Turner. It referred to the people at the meeting as "ignorant and half-crazy dreamers" and declared that it was the country's "right - in the belief of Congress and of many, probably of most, Americans', it makes it our duty - to exclude him."

Darrow and Masters presented their defense of Turner before the US Supreme Court in United States ex rel. Turner v. Williams. They argued that the law was unconstitutional and that Turner was merely a "philosophical anarchist" and therefore not a threat to the government. Chief Justice Melville Fuller wrote the Court's decision holding that the Bill of Rights does not apply to aliens, and Congress had the right to deny entry to anyone whom it deemed a threat to the country. Turner became the first person deported under the act.

== Amendment ==
The Act was re-enacted on June 29, 1906.

Advocates for using the immigration laws to combat radicalism campaigned to expand the law's definitions of those who could be excluded or deported. Immigration officials complained about the law's limitation on deportation to the first three years of an immigrant's residency:

The anarchist of foreign birth... remains very quiet, as a rule, until the time limit protects him from deportation and then he is loud and boisterous and begins his maniac cry against all forms of organized government.... There should be no time limit to the deportation of these criminals... and should one remain in hiding sufficiently long to become naturalized he should, at the first symptoms, be shorn of his cloak and forthwith deported.

The 1903 Act was amended by the Immigration Act of 1918, which expanded and elaborated the brief definition of anarchist found in the 1903 Act and enhanced the government's ability to deport adherents of anarchism.

== See also ==
- Page Act of 1875

== Sources ==
- Paul Avrich, Sacco and Vanzetti: The Anarchist Background (Princeton: Princeton University Press, 1991)
- John Chalberg, Emma Goldman: American Individualist (NY: HarperCollins, 1991), ISBN 0-673-52102-8
- Sidney Fine, "Anarchism and the Assassination of McKinley", American Historical Review, vol. LX, no. 4 (July 1955)
- Bill Ong Hing, Defining America Through Immigration Policy (Philadelphia: Temple University Press, 2004)
- Edward P. Hutchinson, Legislative History of American Immigration Policy (Philadelphia: University of Pennsylvania Press, 1981)
- Frederick Van Dyne, Citizenship of the United States (Lawyers' Co-operative Publishing, 1904), available online, ISBN 0-8377-1229-7
