= Manchester Clayton =

Parliamentary constituency in the United Kingdom, 1918–1955

- Former borough constituency for the House of Commons

1918–1955
- Seats: one
- Created from: Manchester East, Manchester North and Manchester North East
- Replaced by: Manchester Cheetham and Manchester Openshaw

Manchester Clayton was a parliamentary constituency in the city of Manchester. It returned one Member of Parliament (MP) to the House of Commons of the Parliament of the United Kingdom, elected by the first past the post system.

The constituency was created for the 1918 general election and abolished for the 1955 general election.

== Boundaries ==
=== 1918–1950 ===
The constituency was created as a result of the Report of the Boundary Commission in 1917, when it was recommended to be called "Manchester Newton Heath". However, when the Representation of the People Bill to give effect to the commission's recommendations was debated in Parliament, the Government accepted an amendment to change the name to Clayton. The new constituency came into effect at the 1918 general election. Although Parliament had altered the recommended name, it retained the recommended boundaries, and was defined as consisting of three municipal wards of the county borough of Manchester, namely Beswick, Bradford and Newton Heath.

=== 1950–1955 ===
Constituencies throughout Great Britain and Northern Ireland were reorganised by the Representation of the People Act 1948, which introduced the term "borough constituency". Manchester, Clayton Borough Constituency was redefined to comprise four wards: Beswick, Bradford, Miles Platting and Newton Heath. Miles Platting had previously formed part of the Manchester Platting seat. The revised boundaries were first used in the 1950 general election.

=== Abolition ===
Following a report by the boundary commissioners appointed under the House of Commons (Redistribution of Seats) Act 1949, constituencies in the Manchester area were reorganised in 1955. The Clayton constituency was abolished, with its area divided between the Manchester Cheetham and Manchester Openshaw seats.

== Members of Parliament ==
Election	Member	Party
1918	Edward Hopkinson	Conservative
1922 by-election	John Edward Sutton	Labour
1922	William Flanagan	Conservative
1923	John Edward Sutton	Labour
1931	William Flanagan	Conservative
1935	John Jagger	Labour
1942 by-election	Harry Thorneycroft	Labour
1955	constituency abolished	

== History of the constituency ==
See Clayton, Greater Manchester

== Election results ==
=== Election in the 1910s ===
General election 1918: Manchester Clayton
Party	Candidate	Votes	%	±%
Unionist	Edward Hopkinson	12,285	61.6	
Labour	John Sutton	7,654	38.4	
Majority		4,631	23.2	
Turnout		19,939	57.5	
Registered electors		34,659		
Unionist win (new seat)				

=== Election in the 1920s ===
By-election, 1922: Manchester Clayton
Party	Candidate	Votes	%	±%
Labour	John Sutton	14,662	57.1	+18.7
Unionist	William Flanagan	11,038	42.9	−18.7
Majority		3,624	14.2	N/A
Turnout		25,700	73.7	+16.2
Registered electors		34,851		
Labour gain from Unionist		Swing	+18.7	

General election 1922: Manchester Clayton
Party	Candidate	Votes	%	±%
Unionist	William Flanagan	14,800	50.0	−11.6
Labour	John Sutton	14,789	50.0	+11.6
Majority		11	0.0	−23.2
Turnout		29,589	82.9	+25.4
Registered electors		35,681		
Unionist hold		Swing	−11.6	

General election 1923: Manchester Clayton
Party	Candidate	Votes	%	±%
Labour	John Sutton	17,255	56.7	+6.7
Unionist	William Flanagan	13,164	43.3	−6.7
Majority		4,091	13.4	N/A
Turnout		30,419	83.5	+0.6
Registered electors		36,430		
Labour gain from Unionist		Swing	+6.7	

General election 1924: Manchester Clayton
Party	Candidate	Votes	%	±%
Labour	John Sutton	17,338	54.2	−2.5
Unionist	T.E. Thorpe	14,634	45.8	+2.5
Majority		2,704	8.4	−5.0
Turnout		31,972	84.7	+1.2
Registered electors		37,729		
Labour hold		Swing	−2.5	

General election 1929: Manchester Clayton
Party	Candidate	Votes	%	±%
Labour	John Sutton	21,103	55.0	+0.8
Unionist	William Flanagan	14,062	36.6	−9.2
Liberal	Charles Harold Travis	3,207	8.4	New
Majority		7,041	18.4	+10.0
Turnout		38,372	83.1	−1.6
Registered electors		47,308		
Labour hold		Swing	+5.0	

=== Election in the 1930s ===
General election 1931: Manchester Clayton Manchester County Borough wards of Beswick, Bradford and Newton Heath
Party	Candidate	Votes	%	±%
Conservative	William Flanagan	22,072	56.2	+15.6
Labour	John Sutton	17,169	43.8	−11.2
Majority		4,903	12.4	N/A
Turnout		39,241	83.4	+0.3
Registered electors		47,038		
Conservative gain from Labour		Swing	+13.4	

General election 1935: Manchester Clayton
Party	Candidate	Votes	%	±%
Labour	John Jagger	19,225	53.7	+9.9
Conservative	Thomas Hewlett	16,557	46.3	−9.9
Majority		2,668	7.4	N/A
Turnout		35,782	77.0	−7.4
Registered electors		46,475		
Labour gain from Conservative		Swing	+9.9	

=== Election in the 1940s ===
By-election, 1942: Manchester Clayton
Party	Candidate	Votes	%	±%
Labour	Harry Thorneycroft	8,892	93.3	+39.6
Independent	E. H. Foot	636	6.7	New
Majority		8,256	86.6	+79.2
Turnout		9,528	20.8	−56.2
Registered electors		45,720		
Labour hold		Swing		

General election 1945: Manchester Clayton Manchester County Borough wards of Beswick, Bradford and Newton Heath
Party	Candidate	Votes	%	±%
Labour	Harry Thorneycroft	22,401	69.4	+15.7
National Liberal	Philip Smith	9,883	30.6	−15.7
Majority		12,518	38.8	+31.4
Turnout		32,284	69.6	−7.4
Registered electors		46,394		
Labour hold		Swing		

=== Elections in the 1950s ===
General election 1950: Manchester Clayton Manchester County Borough wards of Beswick, Bradford, Miles Platting and Newton Heath
Party	Candidate	Votes	%	±%
Labour	Harry Thorneycroft	29,128	63.0	−6.4
Conservative	D H Broome	14,800	32.0	+1.4
Liberal	Herbert Walls	2,295	5.0	New
Majority		14,328	31.0	−6.8
Turnout		46,223		
Labour hold		Swing		

General election 1951: Manchester Clayton Manchester County Borough wards of Beswick, Bradford, Miles Platting and Newton Heath
Party	Candidate	Votes	%	±%
Labour	Harry Thorneycroft	27,985	63.5	+0.5
Conservative	Marjorie S Grant	16,122	36.5	+4.5
Majority		11,863	27.0	−4.0
Turnout		44,107		
Labour hold		Swing		

== Sources ==
- Craig, F. W. S. (1983) [1969]. British parliamentary election results 1918–1949 (3rd ed.). Chichester: Parliamentary Research Services. ISBN 0-900178-06-X.
- Leigh Rayment's Historical List of MPs – Constituencies beginning with "C" (part 4)
