= National Union of Distributive and Allied Workers =

Former trade union of the United Kingdom

- Predecessor: Amalgamated Union of Co-operative Employees; National Union of Warehouse and General Workers
- Merged into: Union of Shop, Distributive and Allied Workers
- Founded: 1 January 1921
- Dissolved: 1 January 1947
- Headquarters: 122 Wilmslow Road, Manchester
- Location: United Kingdom
- Members: 274,000 (1946)
- Affiliations: Labour, TUC, STUC

The National Union of Distributive and Allied Workers (NUDAW) was a trade union in the United Kingdom.

== History ==
The union was founded in 1921 when the Amalgamated Union of Co-operative Employees merged with the National Union of Warehouse and General Workers. The Co-operative Insurance Staff Union split in 1922, but several small unions joined during the 1920s, and membership reached 96,000 by 1926, rising to 274,000 in 1946, the year that the Journeymen Butchers' Federation of Great Britain joined. By this point, four-tenths of its members were women.

In 1947, NUDAW merged with the National Amalgamated Union of Shop Assistants, to form the Union of Shop, Distributive and Allied Workers. Joseph Hallsworth was General Secretary of the union for its entire existence.

== Election results ==
The union stood a large number of Labour Party candidates, many of whom won election.

Election	Constituency	Candidate	Votes	Percentage	Position
1921 by-election	Westhoughton	Rhys Davies	14,876	58.4	1
1922 general election	Shipley	William Mackinder	11,160	37.2	2
1922 general election	Westhoughton	Rhys Davies	14,846	55.4	1
1923 general election	Ashton-under-Lyne	Ellen Wilkinson	6,208	28.7	3
1923 general election	Shipley	William Mackinder	11,918	38.4	1
1923 general election	Spen Valley	Tom Myers	12,597	37.4	2
1923 general election	Stafford	William Thomas Scott	8,412	46.1	2
1923 general election	Westhoughton	Rhys Davies	15,347	60.3	1
1924 general election	Jarrow	Robert John Wilson	18,203	57.4	1
1924 general election	Liverpool Wavertree	William Albert Robinson	10,383	35.0	2
1924 general election	Manchester Blackley	Wilfrid Burke	6,195	27.5	3
1924 general election	Middlesbrough East	Ellen Wilkinson	9,574	38.5	1
1924 general election	Shipley	William Mackinder	11,862	36.0	1
1924 general election	Spen Valley	Tom Myers	13,999	43.1	2
1924 general election	Stafford	William Thomas Scott	7,571	37.9	2
1924 general election	Westhoughton	Rhys Davies	16,033	55.8	1
1929 general election	Jarrow	Robert John Wilson	22,751	62.5	1
1929 general election	Liverpool Exchange	William Albert Robinson	16,970	49.7	2
1929 general election	Manchester Blackley	Wilfrid Burke	9,091	30.1	3
1929 general election	Middlesbrough East	Ellen Wilkinson	12,215	41.3	1
1929 general election	Shipley	William Mackinder	18,654	42.3	1
1929 general election	Westhoughton	Rhys Davies	22,305	61.5	1
1930 by-election	Shipley	William Mackinder	18,654	42.3	1
1931 general election	Jarrow	Robert John Wilson	18,071	45.9	2
1931 general election	Middlesbrough East	Ellen Wilkinson	12,080	39.6	2
1931 general election	Shipley	William Albert Robinson	14,725	34.5	2
1931 general election	Westhoughton	Rhys Davies	19,301	53.4	1
1935 general election	Burnley	Wilfrid Burke	31,160	53.6	1
1935 general election	Jarrow	Ellen Wilkinson	20,324	53.1	1
1935 general election	Manchester Clayton	John Jagger	19,225	53.7	1
1935 general election	Rossendale	Evelyn Walkden	14,769	37.1	2
1935 general election	St Helens	William Albert Robinson	29,044	53.7	1
1935 general election	Thornbury	F. A. Heron	15,164	37.5	2
1935 general election	Westhoughton	Rhys Davies	21,093	60.4	1
1941 by-election	Doncaster	Evelyn Walkden	unopposed	N/A	1
1945 general election	Burnley	Wilfrid Burke	32,122	63.5	1
1945 general election	Doncaster	Evelyn Walkden	40,050	70.2	1
1945 general election	Jarrow	Ellen Wilkinson	22,656	66.0	1
1945 general election	Leigh	Harold Boardman	32,447	69.8	1
1945 general election	Wansbeck	Alfred Robens	40,948	60.0	1
1945 general election	Westhoughton	Rhys Davies	20,990	64.9	1
1945 general election	West Renfrewshire	Thomas Scollan	15,050	48.9	1

== Leadership ==
=== General secretaries ===
1921: Joseph Hallsworth

=== General presidents ===
1921: John Jagger
1942: Percy Cottrell
