= Amalgamated Union of Co-operative Employees =

Former trade union of the United Kingdom

- Merged into: National Union of Distributive and Allied Workers
- Founded: 1891
- Dissolved: 1921
- Headquarters: Long Millgate, Manchester
- Location: United Kingdom
- Members: 51,399 (1915)
- Affiliations: TUC, Labour

The Amalgamated Union of Co-operative Employees (AUCE) was a trade union representing retail and related staff of co-operative businesses in the United Kingdom.

The union was founded in 1891 at a meeting in Romiley and was originally named the Manchester and District Co-operative Employees Association. Initially, it had joint secretaries, J. Thompson and Alfred Hewitt, but Thompson left the industry later in the year, leaving Hewitt as sole secretary until 1916.

From 1895, it accepted members from across the country, changing its name to the "Amalgamated Union of Co-operative Employees" and merging with the Bolton and District Co-operative Employees Association. On its formation its net assets were a modest £98 2s 2d. Its membership was 2,151, but the merger commenced a rapid rise in membership, from 2,414 in 1896 to 6,733 in 1900, 25,139 in 1908 and 44,000 by 1914. The membership always included women, although they formed only a small proportion of the total, and from at least 1909, it included workers in Ireland.

In 1917, the union renamed itself as the Amalgamated Union of Co-operative and Commercial and Allied Workers; despite the change in name, the union's constitution specified that its short form would remain "AUCE". In 1920, the Co-operative Agents' Union joined, but at the start of 1921, the AUCE merged with the National Warehouse and General Workers' Union, creating the National Union of Distributive and Allied Workers.

== General Secretaries ==
1891: J. Thompson and Alfred Hewitt
1891: Alfred Hewitt
1916: Joseph Hallsworth

== General Presidents ==
1891: James Dyson
1897: Thomas Howe
1915: Robert Bell Padley
1919: John Jagger
