= Royal Academy Exhibition of 1868 =

1868 art exhibition in London

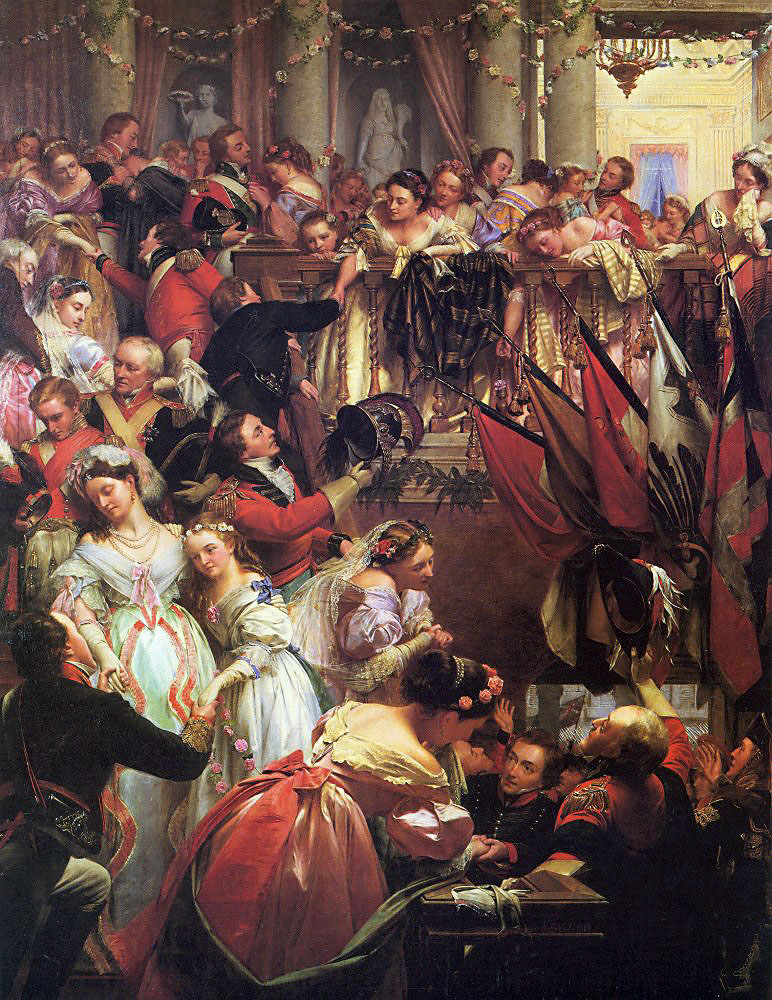
Before Waterloo by Henry Nelson O'Neil

The Royal Academy Exhibition of 1868 was the hundredth annual Summer Exhibition of the British Royal Academy of Arts. It was held between 4 May and 23 July 1868. It was the last to be held at the National Gallery in London's Trafalgar Square, which had been the headquarters of the Royal Academy since its move from its previous home Somerset House in 1836. The following year the exhibition moved to Burlington House in Piccadilly

The president of the Royal Academy Francis Grant exhibited a battle scene The Duke of Cambridge at the Battle of the Alma. Other works on display included Sisters by John Everett Millais and his Greenwich Pensioners at the Tomb of Nelson. William Powell Frith showed Before Dinner at Boswell's Lodging and She Stoops to Conquer. Medea by Frederick Sandys was accepted by the committee for display but never hung, possibly due to concerns about the subject matter. The Irish artist Daniel Maclise displayed The Sleep of Duncan, inspired by Shakespeare's Macbeth. John Everett Millais chose another Shakesperean theme Rosalnd and Celia based on As You Like It. While the painting is now untracted, a preparatory sketch Rosalind in the Forest is in the Walker Art Gallery. Frederick Richard Pickersgill showed the history painting Christopher Columbus at Lisbon. The landscape painting Bowman's Moss, Balmoral Forest by Peter Graham was a royal commission.

== Gallery ==
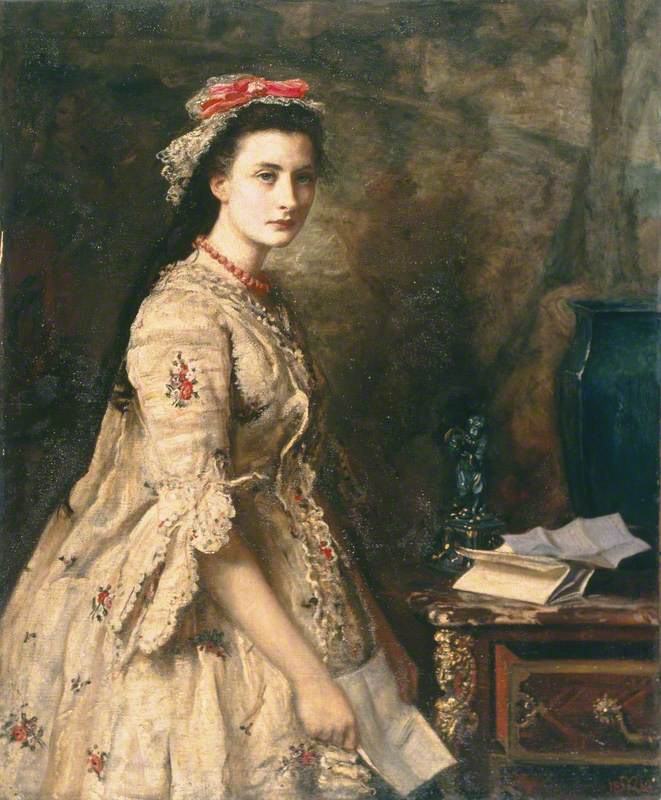
Stella by John Everett Millais

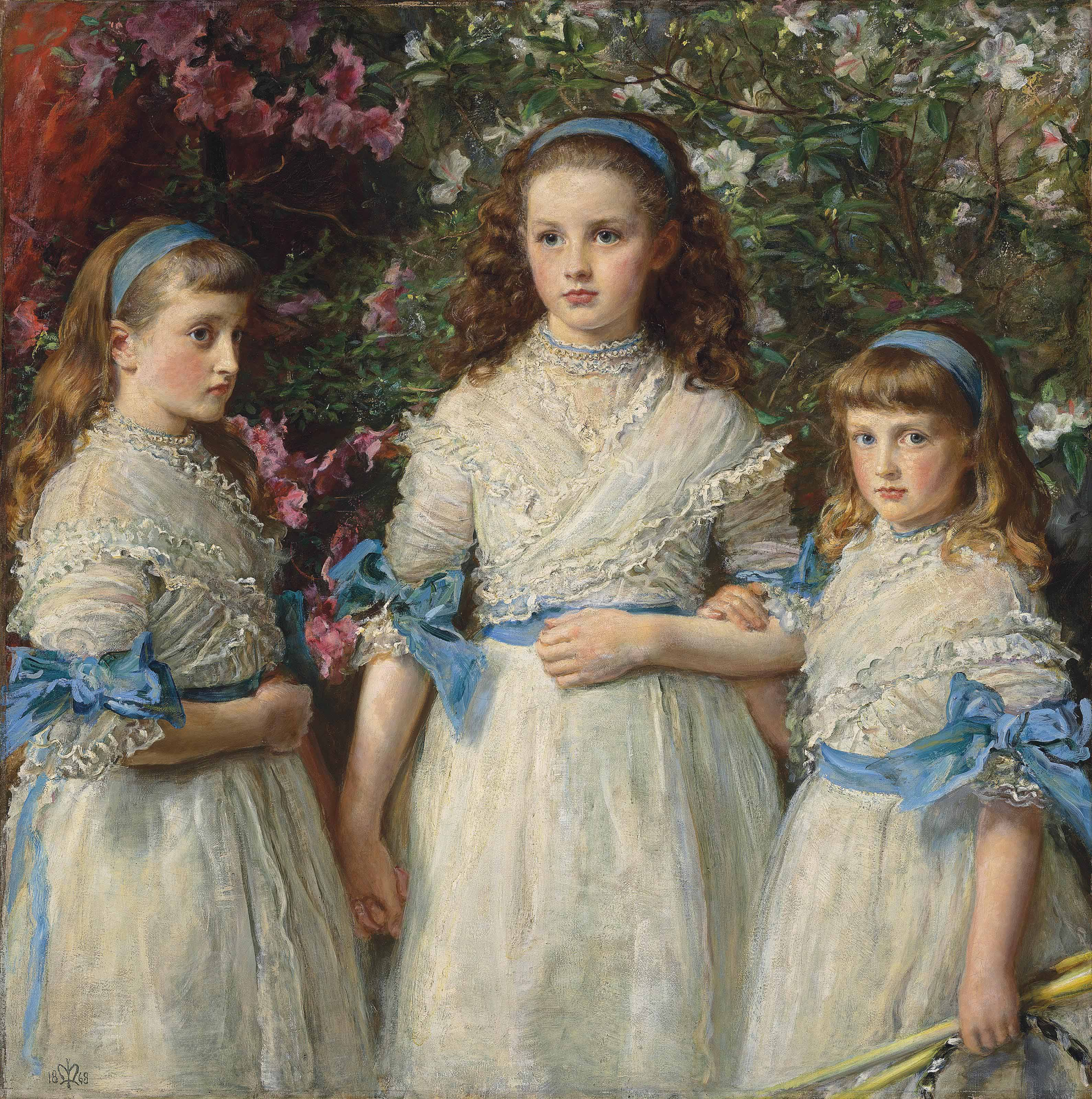
Sisters by John Everett Millais

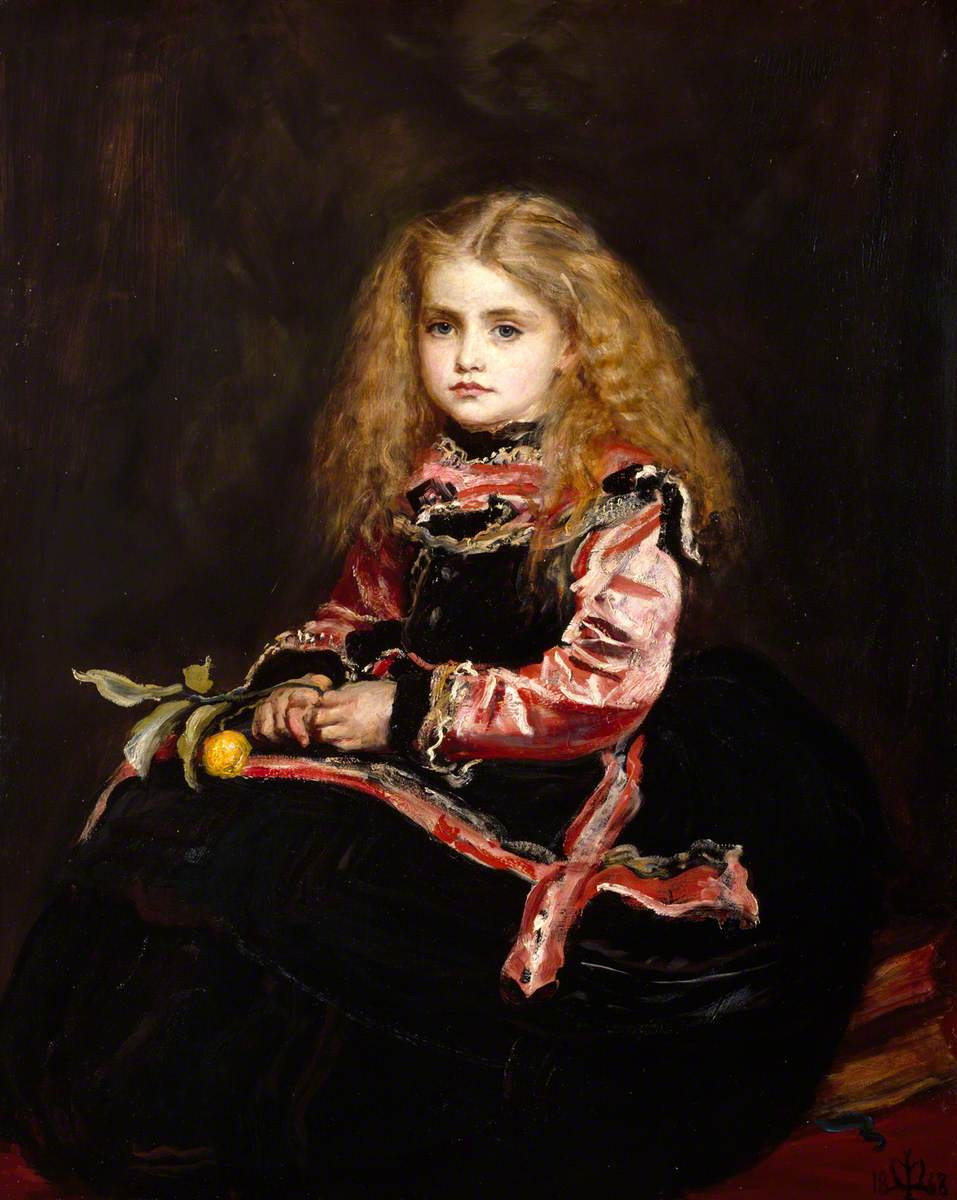
A Souvenir of Velasquez by John Everett Millais

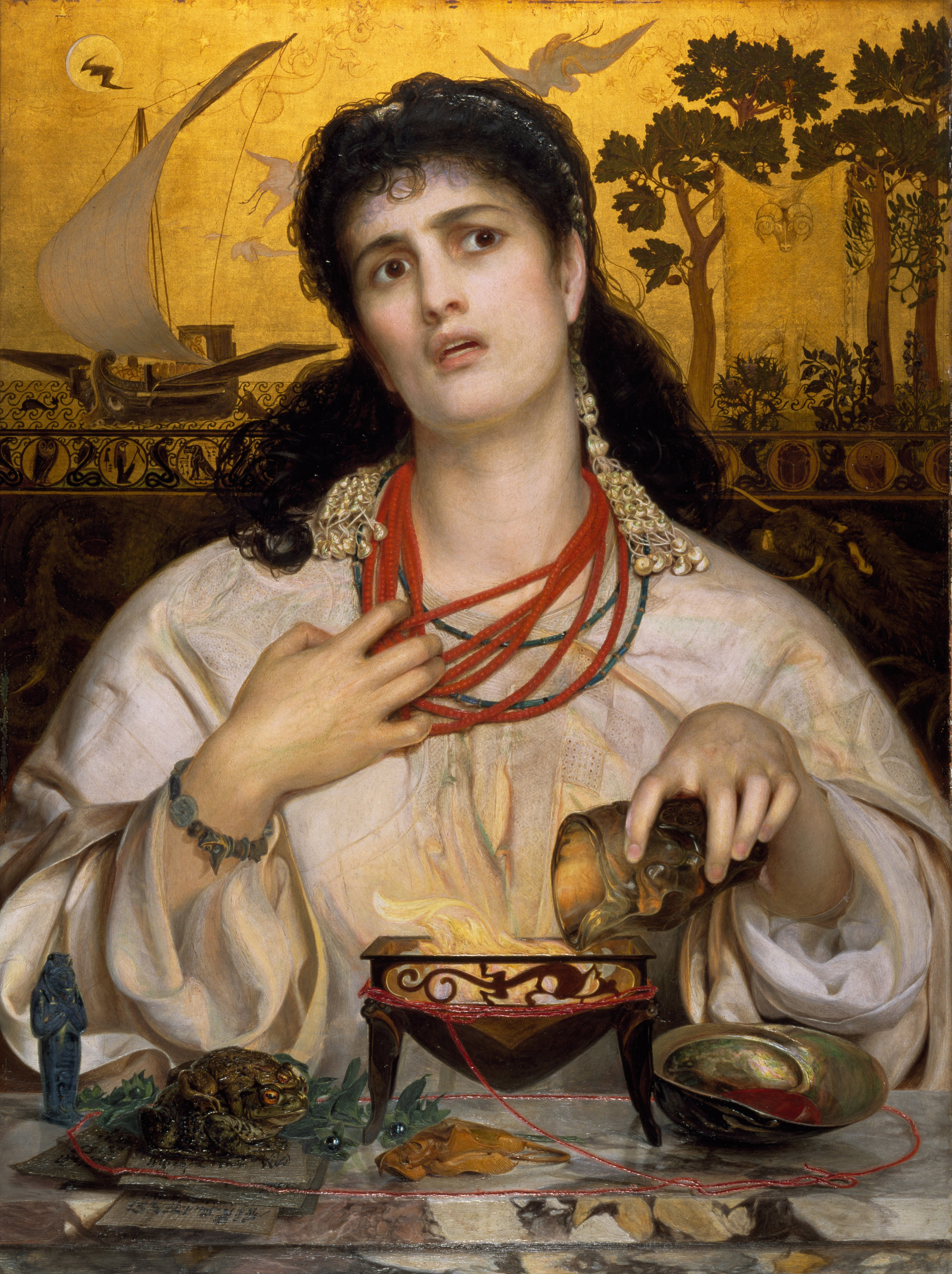
Medea by Frederick Sandys

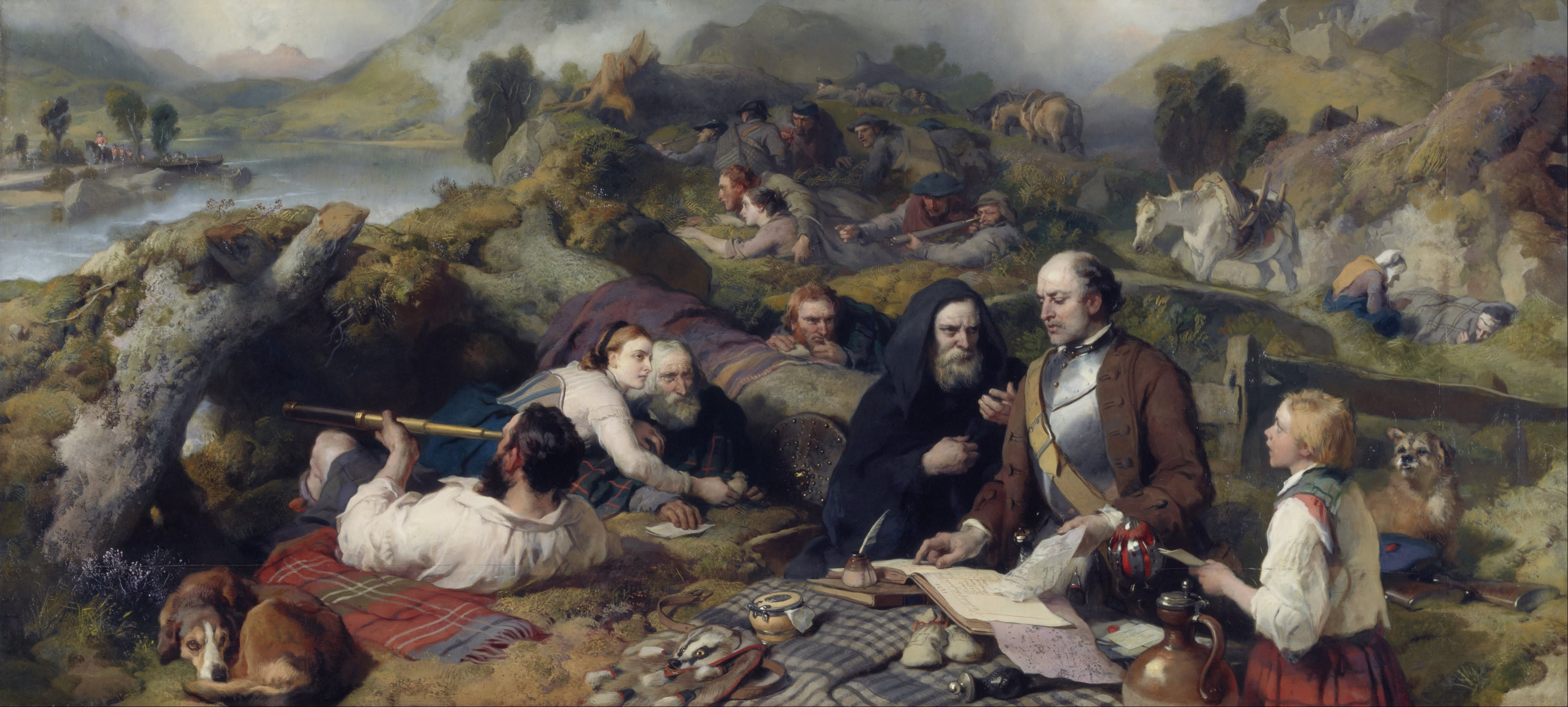
Rent Day in the Wilderness by Edwin Landseer

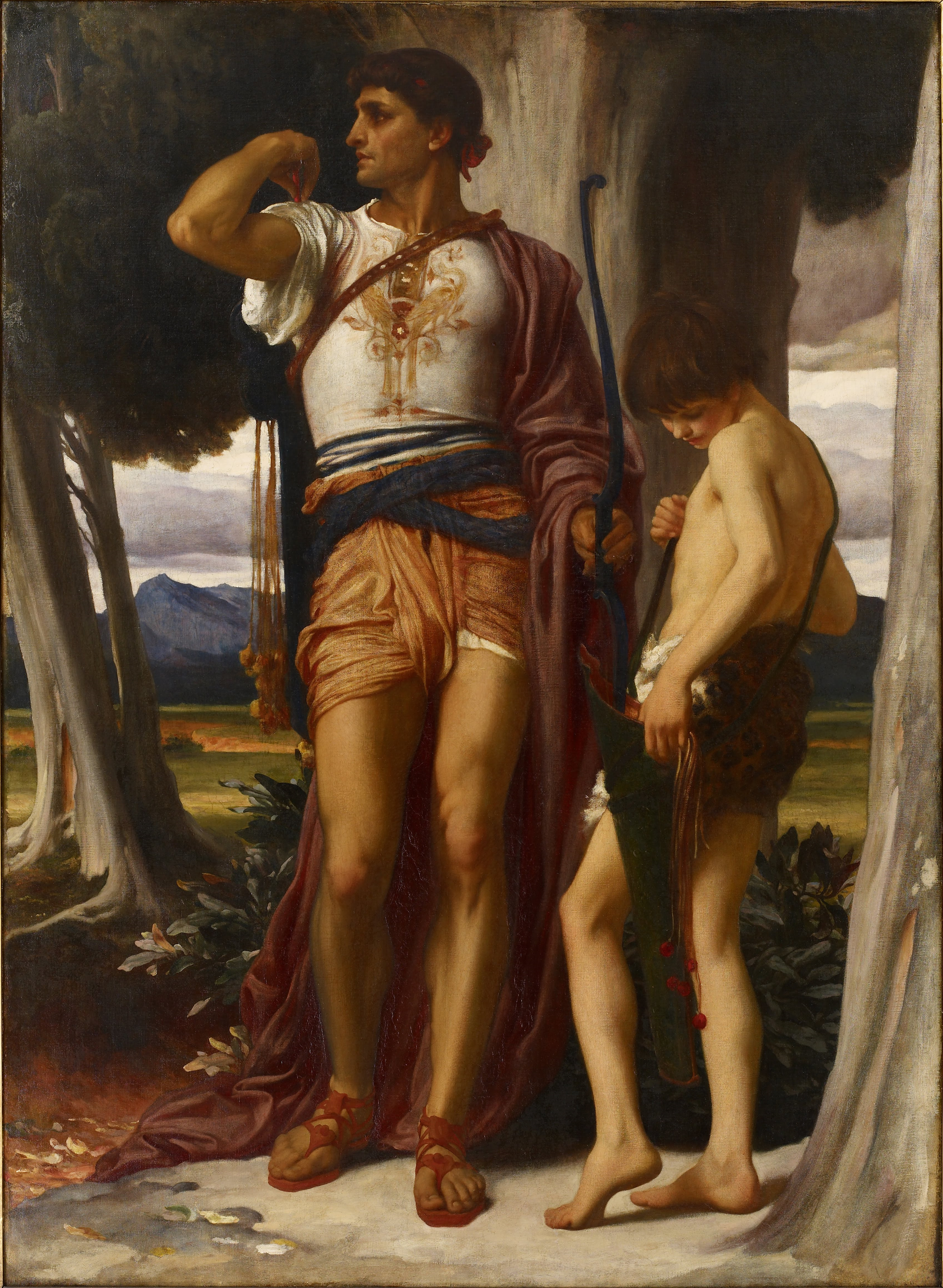
Jonathan's Token to David by Frederic Leighton

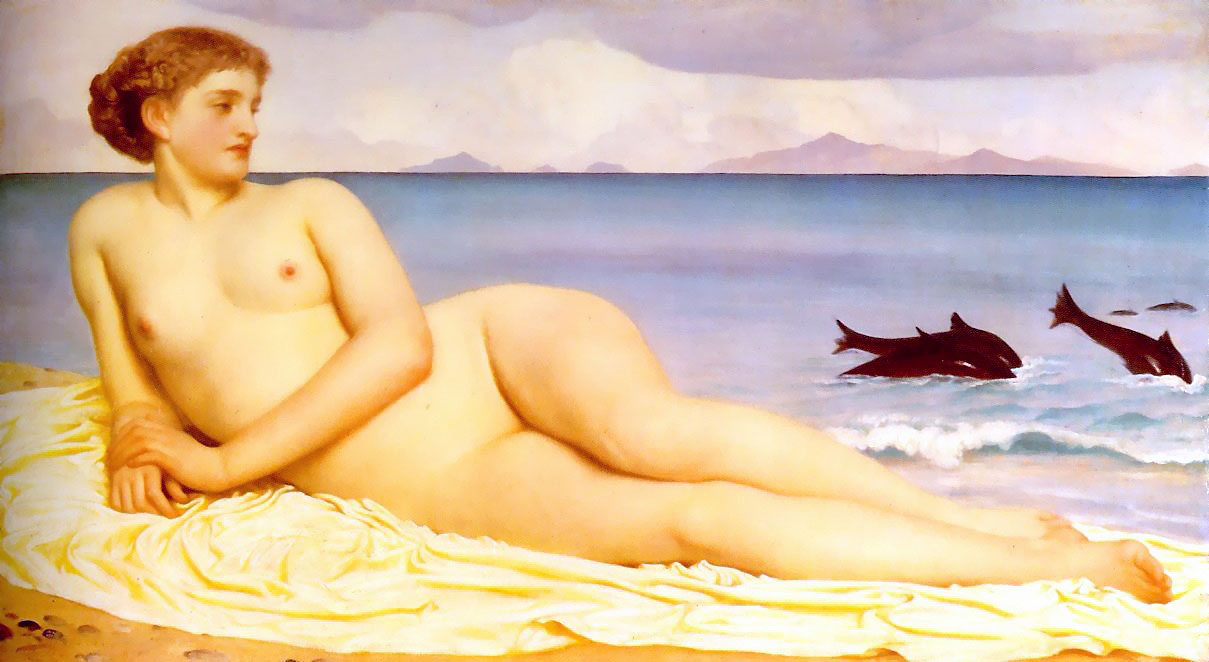
Actaea, the Nymph of the Shore by Frederic Leighton

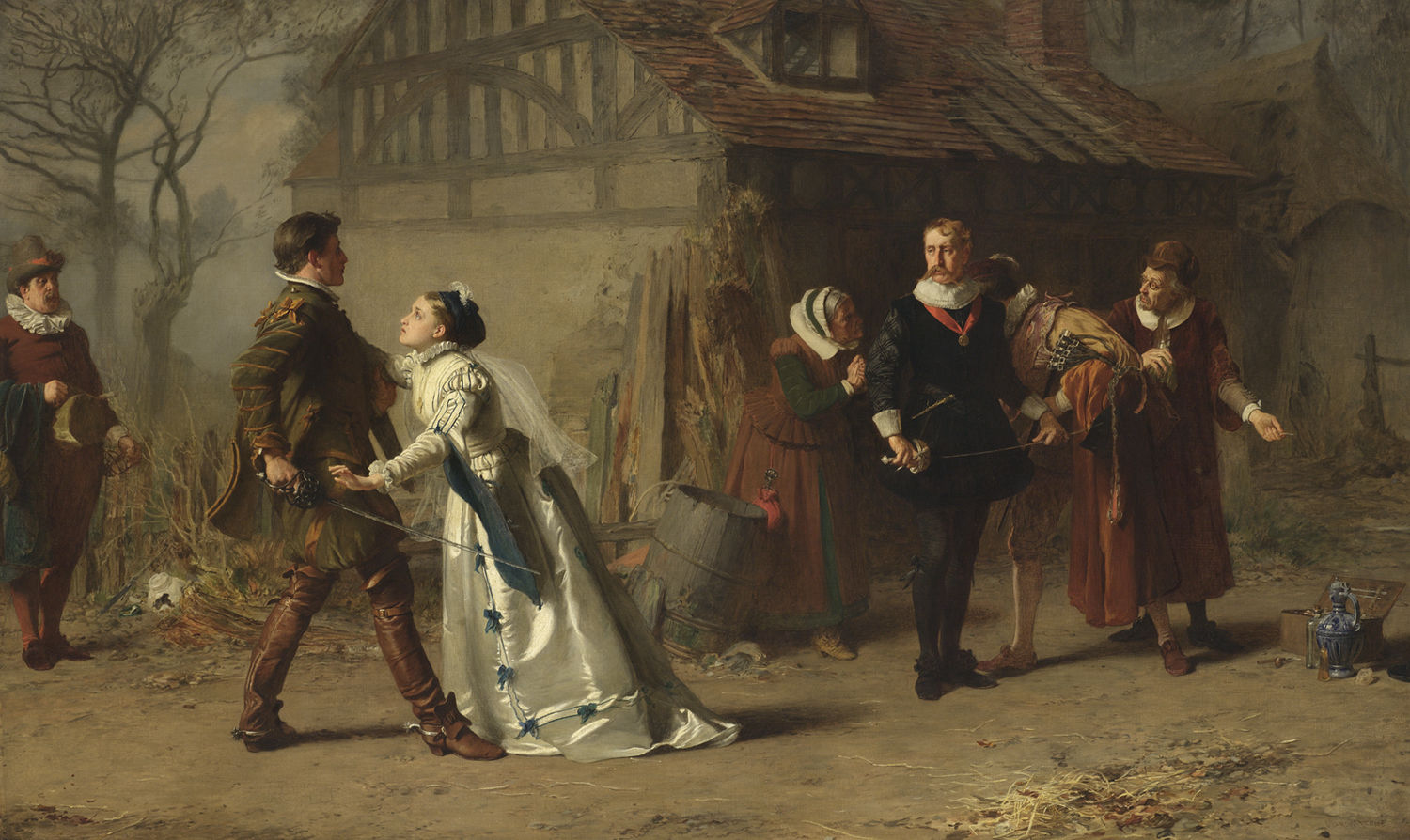
An Interrupted Duel by Marcus Stone

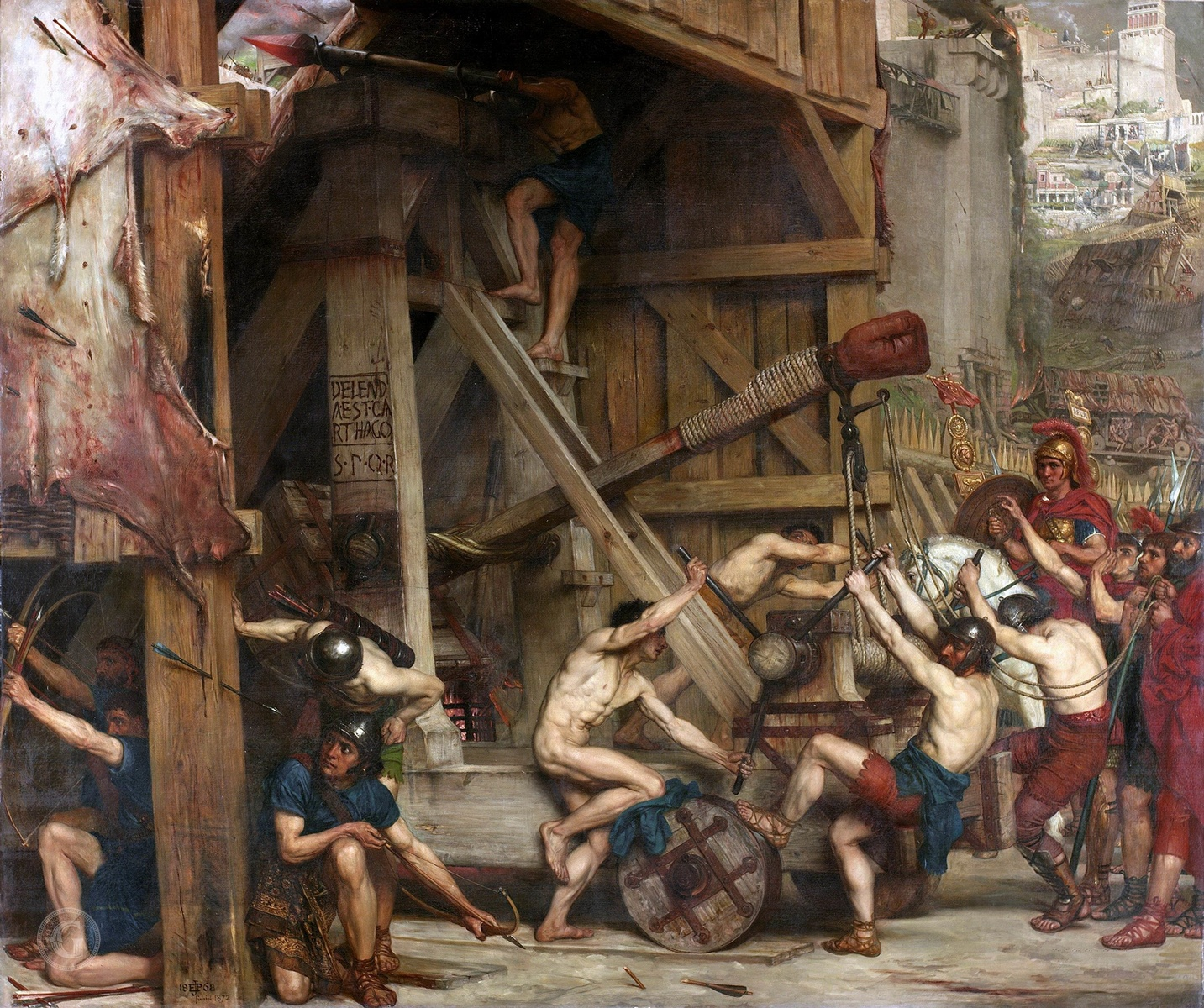
The Catapult by Edward Poynter

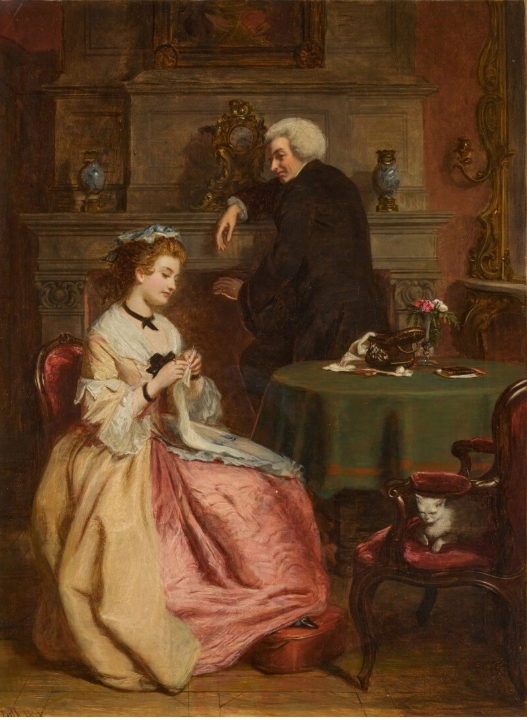
Sterne and the French Innkeeper's Daughter by William Powell Frith

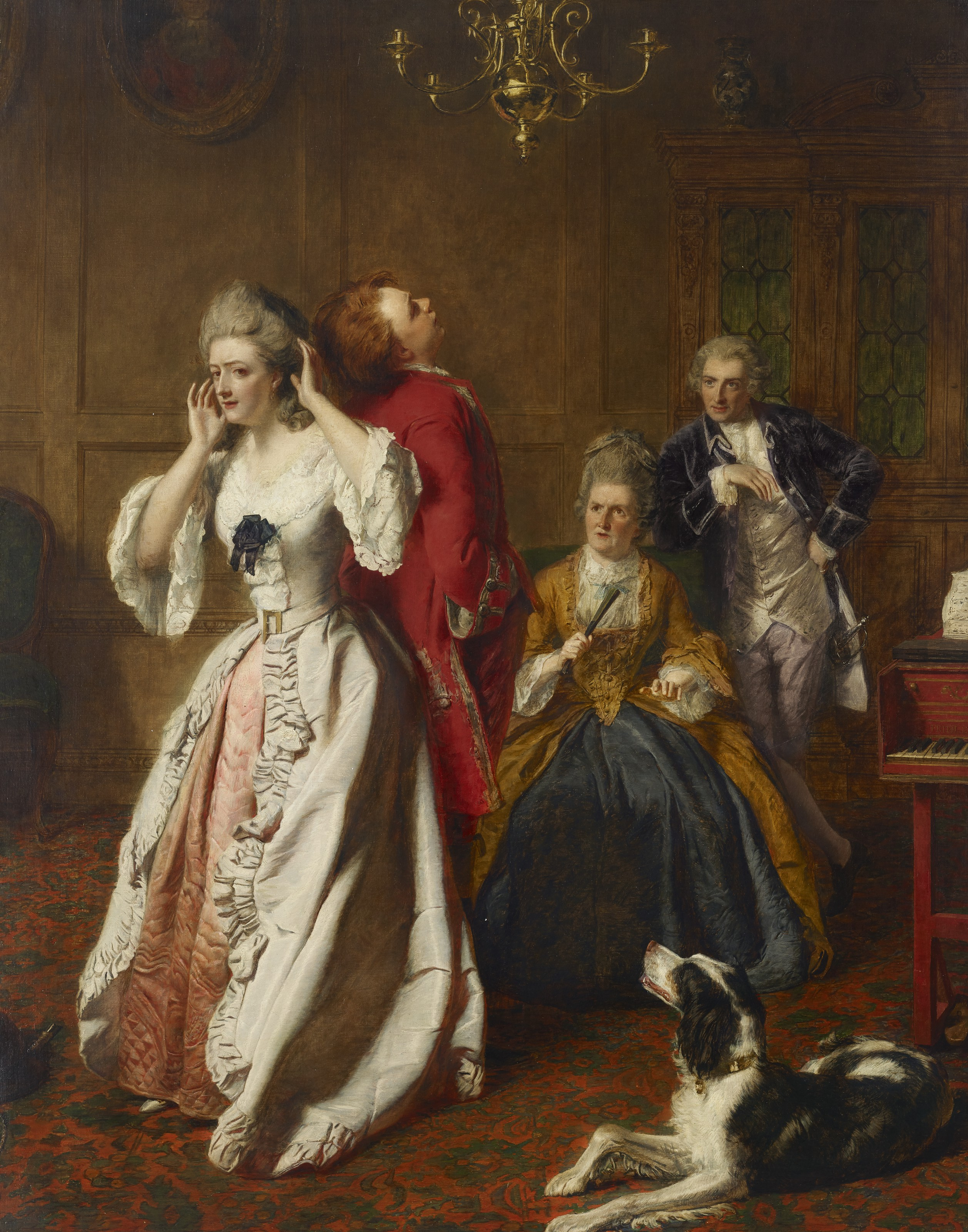
She Stoops to Conquer by William Powell Frith

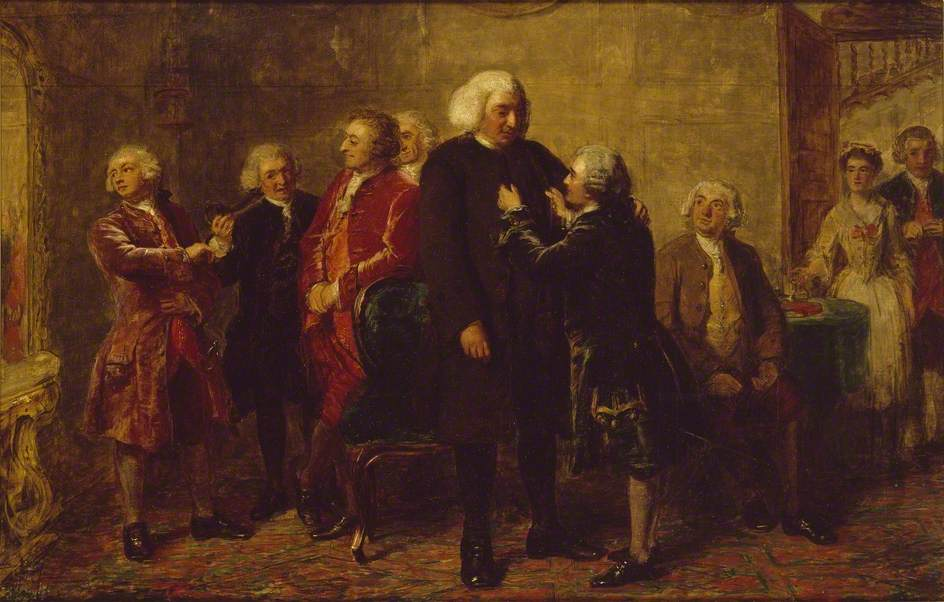
Before Dinner at Boswell's Lodging, 1769 by William Powell Frith

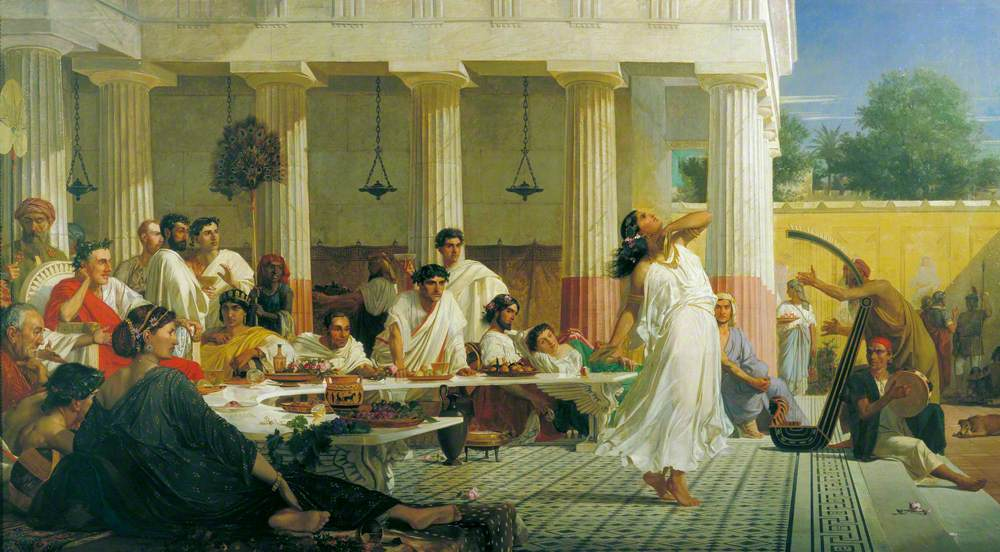
Herod's Birthday Feast by Edward Armitage

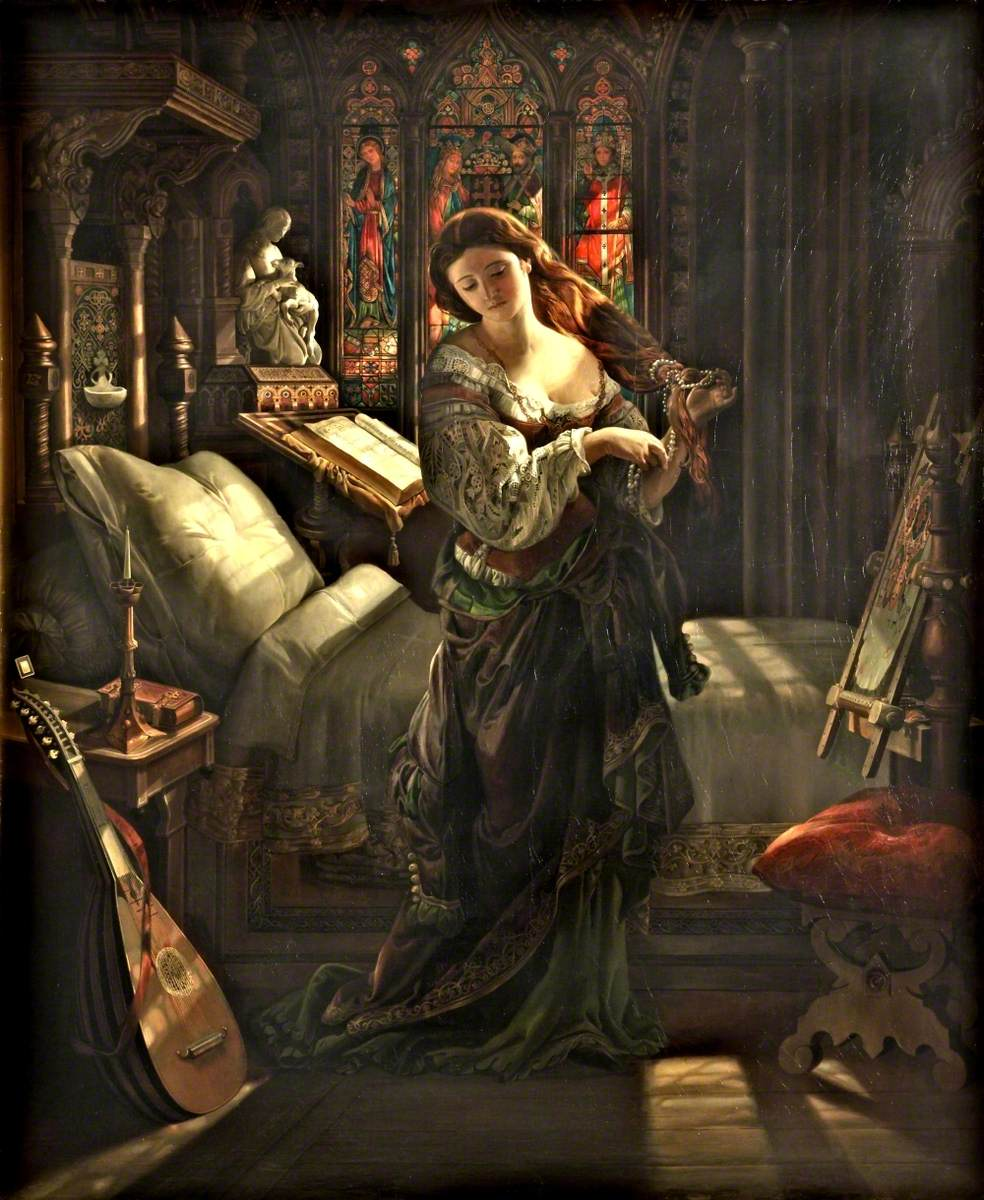
Madeline after Prayer by Daniel Maclise

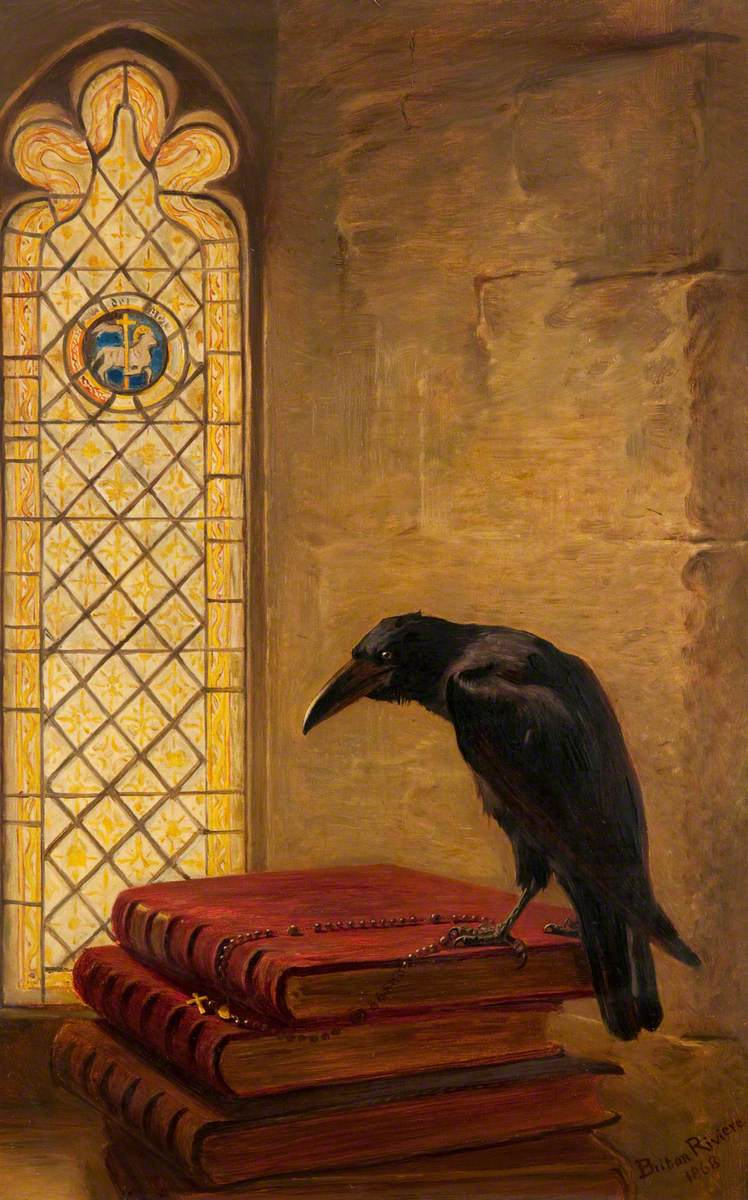
A Saint by Briton Riviere

The Life's Story by Charles West Cope

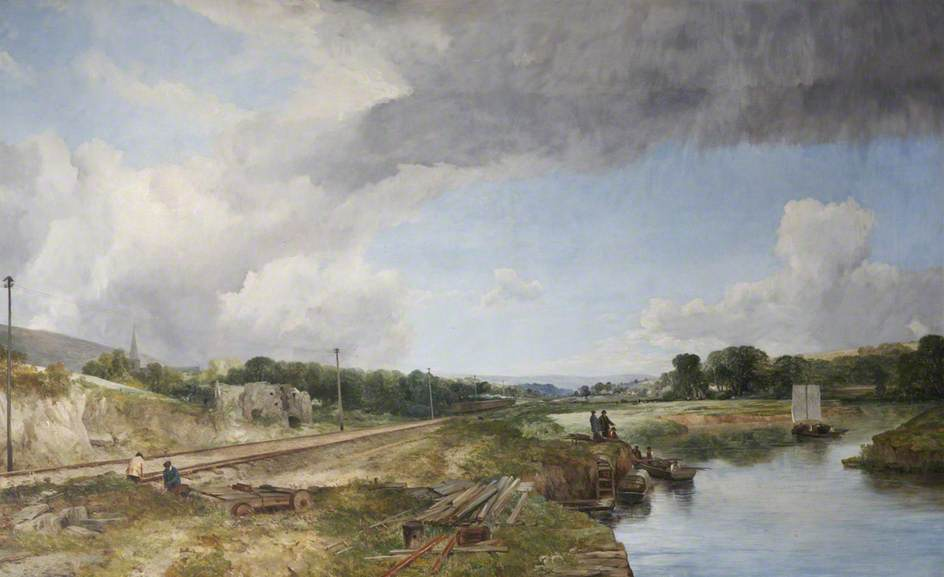
River Taw and the North Devon Railway, Near Barnstaple by Frederick Richard Lee

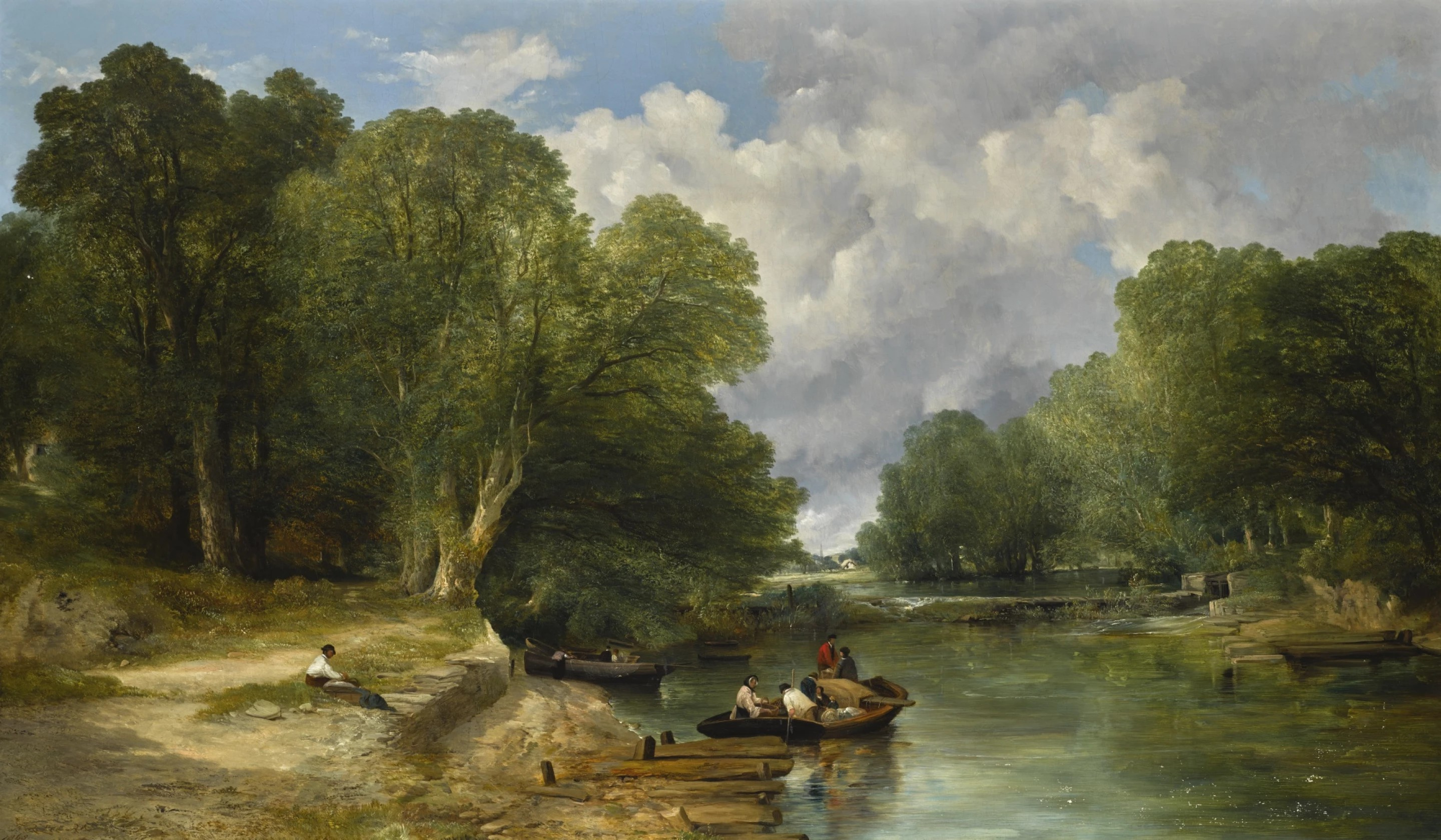
The Ferry Crossing by Frederick Richard Lee

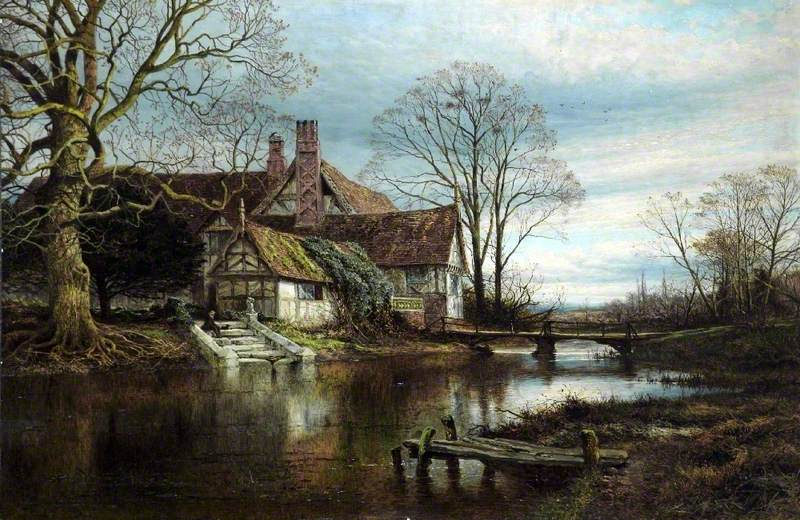
The Moated Grange by Benjamin Williams Leader

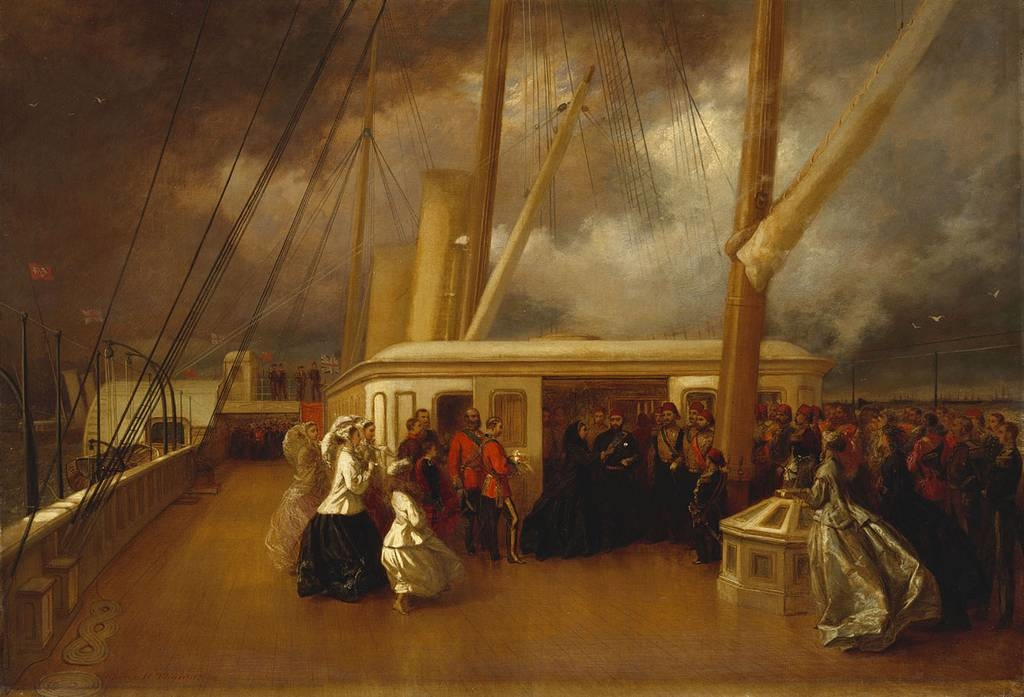
The Investiture of the Sultan with the Order of the Garter by George Housman Thomas

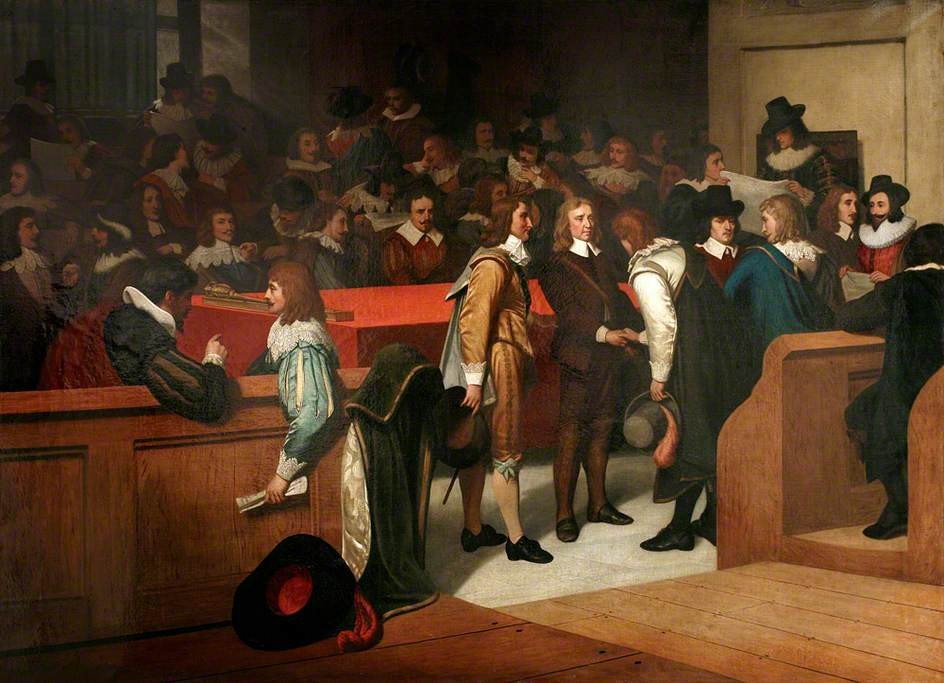
Cromwell's First Appearance in Parliament by David Wilkie Wynfield

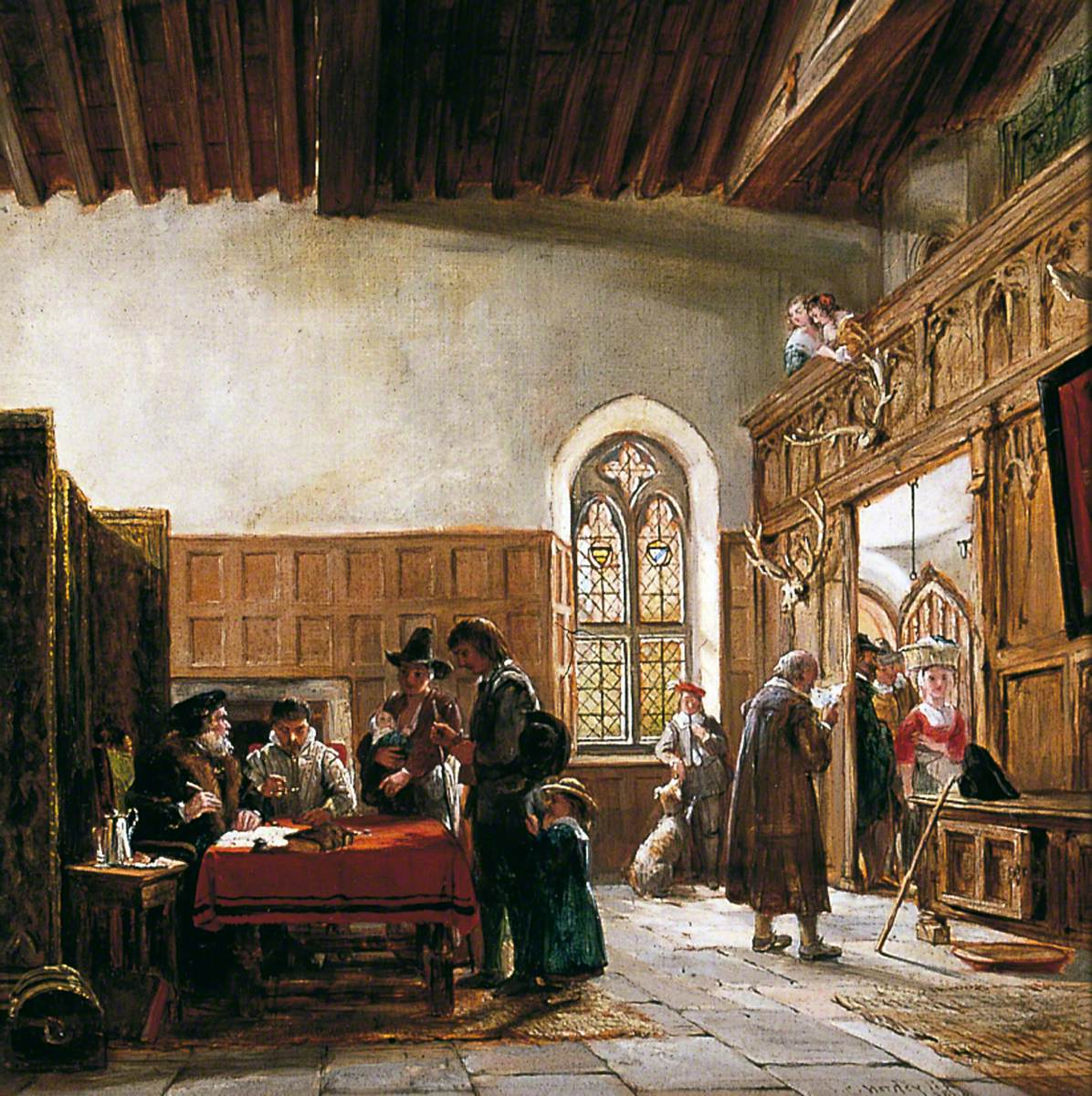
Rent Day at Haddon Hall by John Callcott Horsley

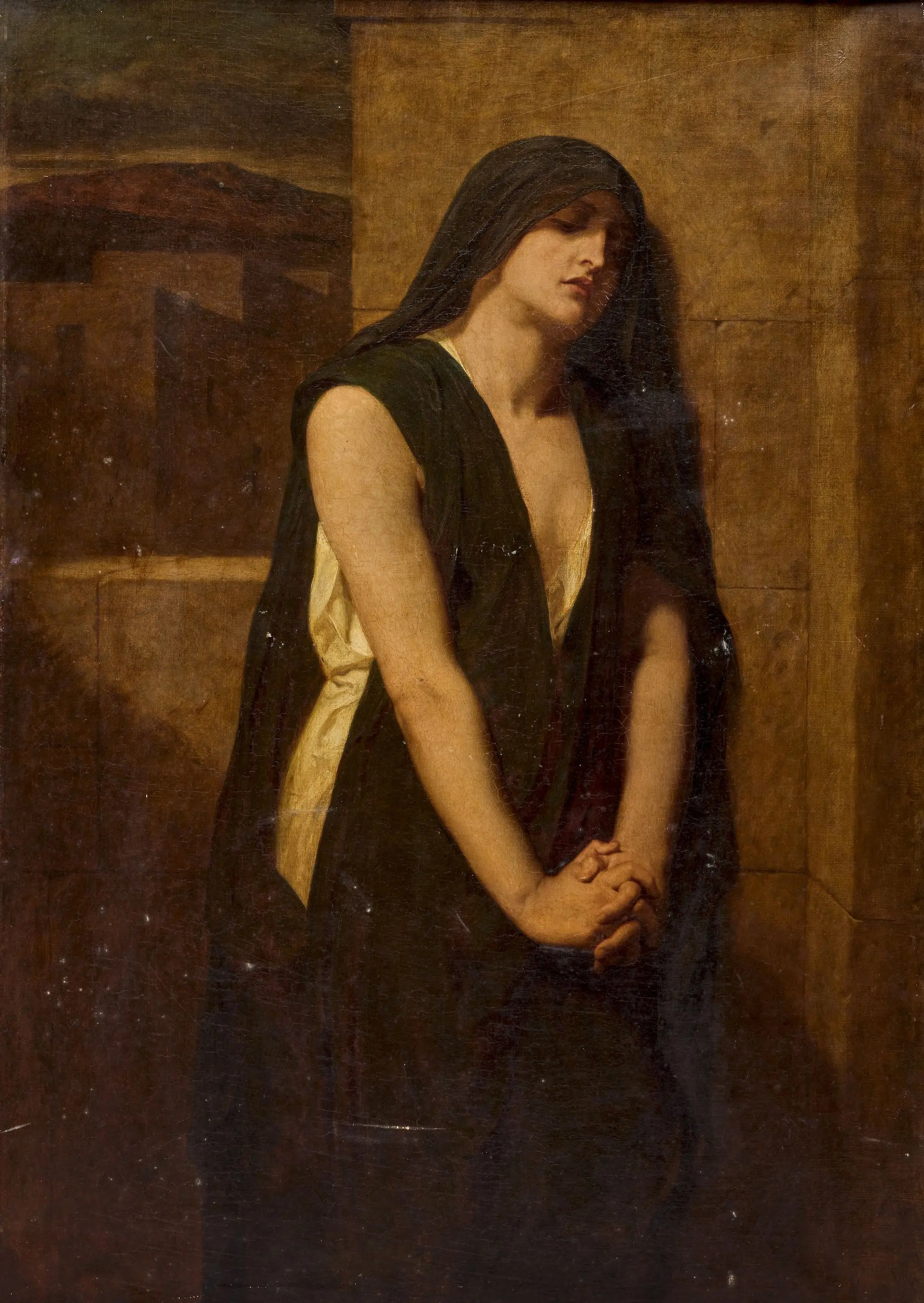
Mater Dolorosa by Frederick Goodall

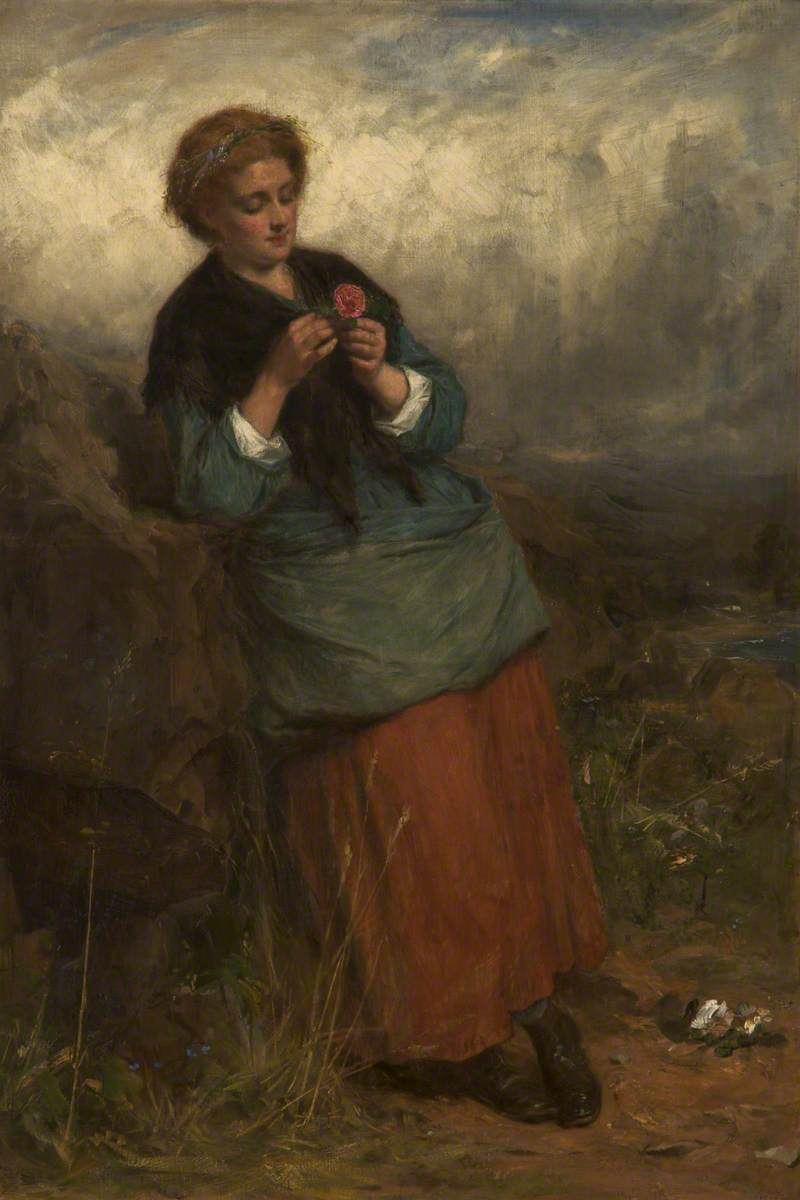
The Flower of Dunblane by Thomas Faed

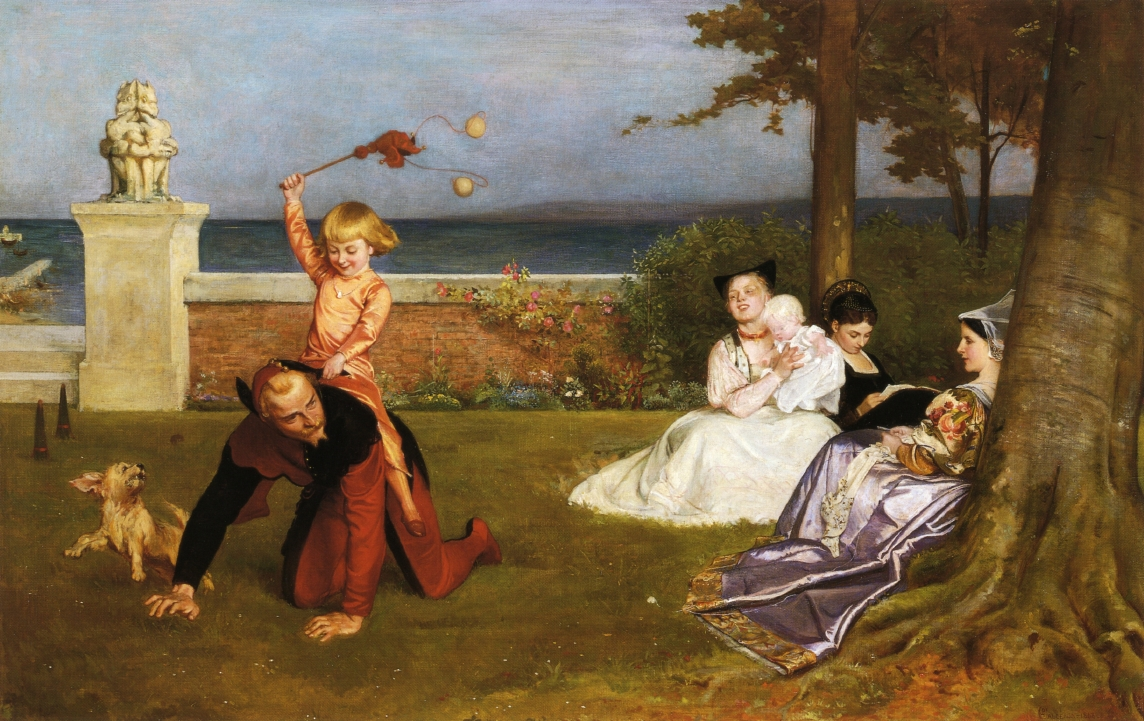
The Young Lord Hamlet by Philip Hermogenes Calderon

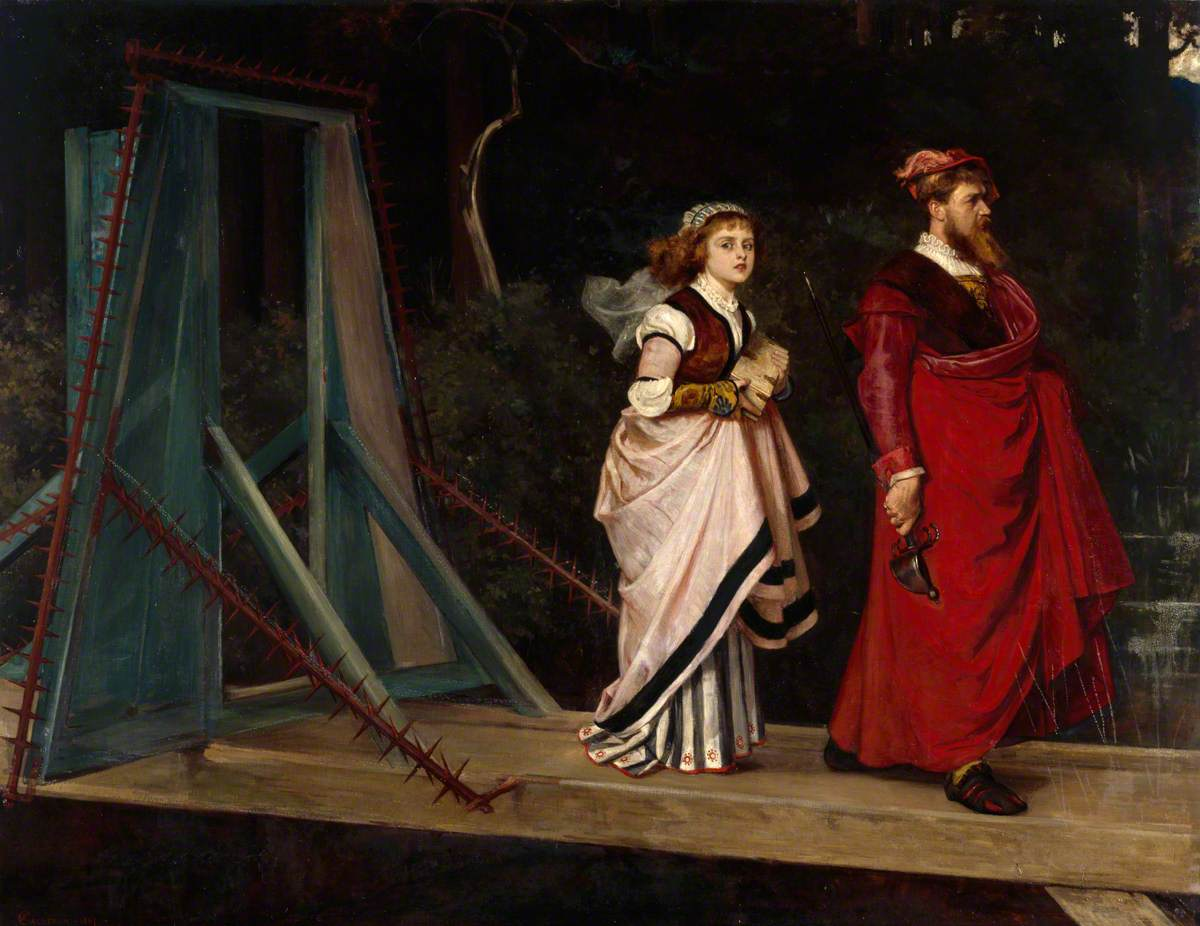
Whither? by Philip Hermogenes Calderon

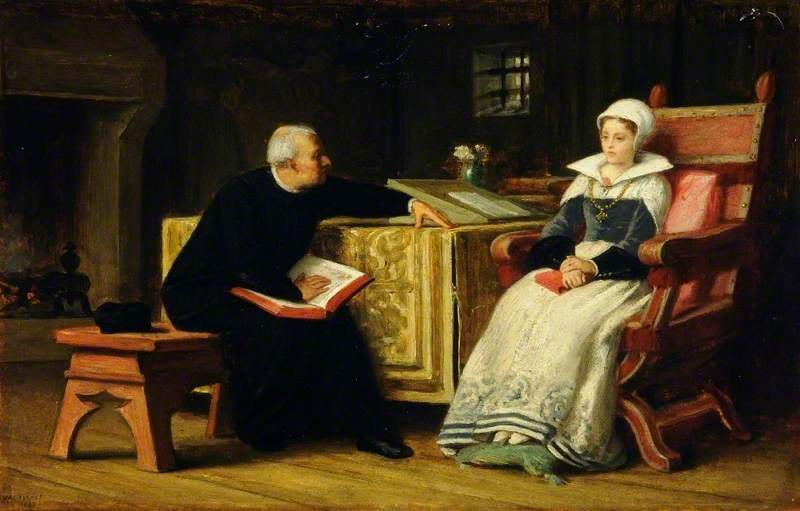
Lady Jane Grey in the Tower by William Frederick Yeames

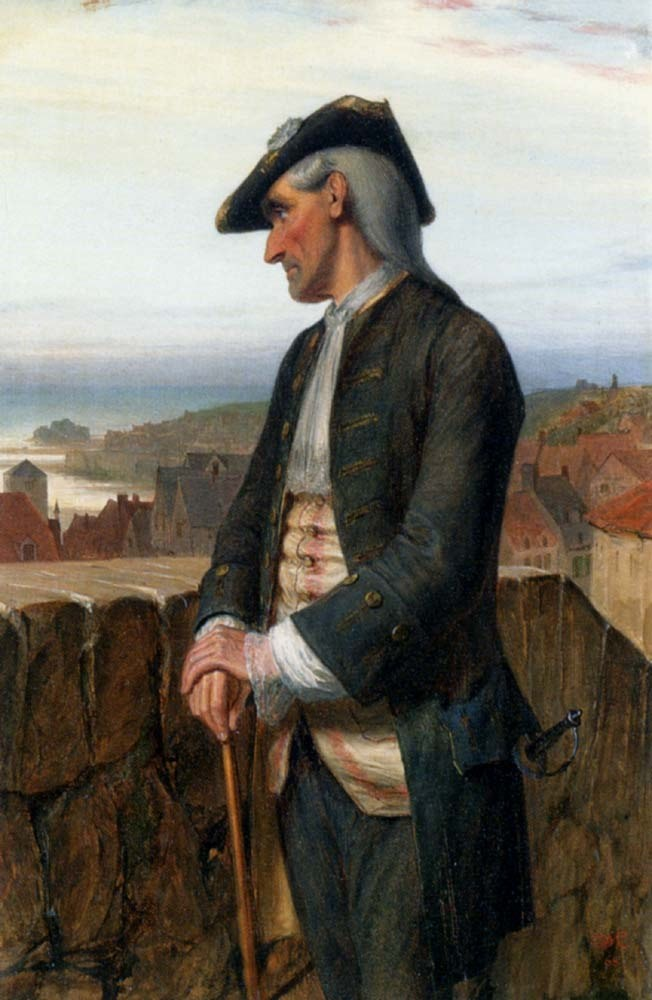
The Exiled Jacobite by Charles Sillem Lidderdale

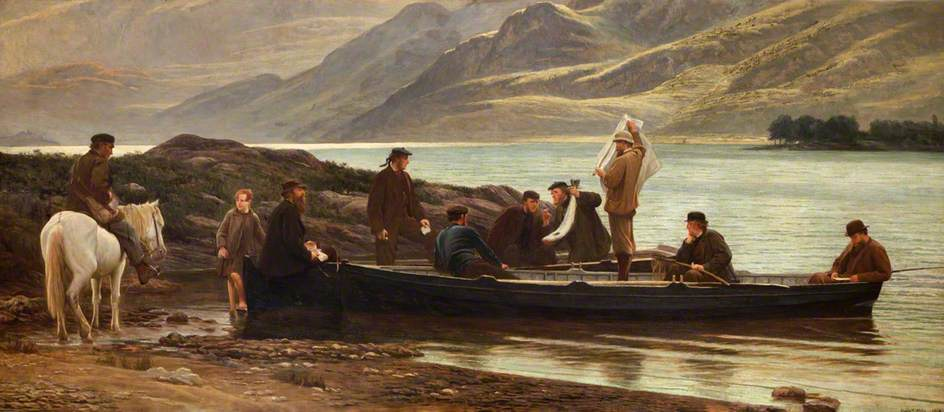
Letters and News at the Loch Side by Henry Tanworth Wells

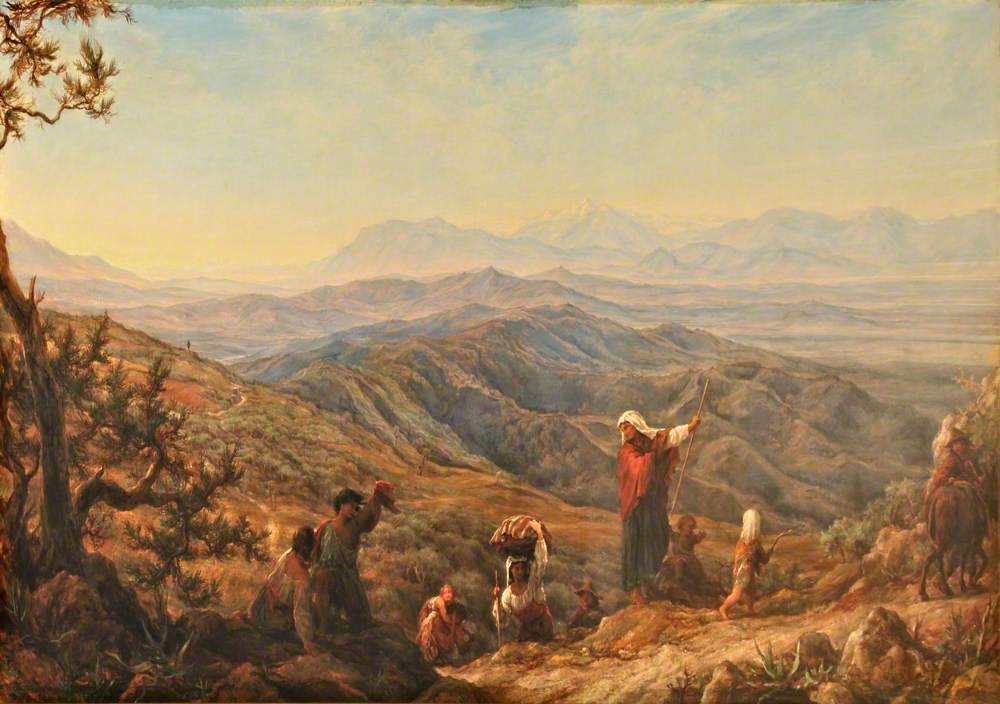
The Heights of the Abruzzi by William Linnell

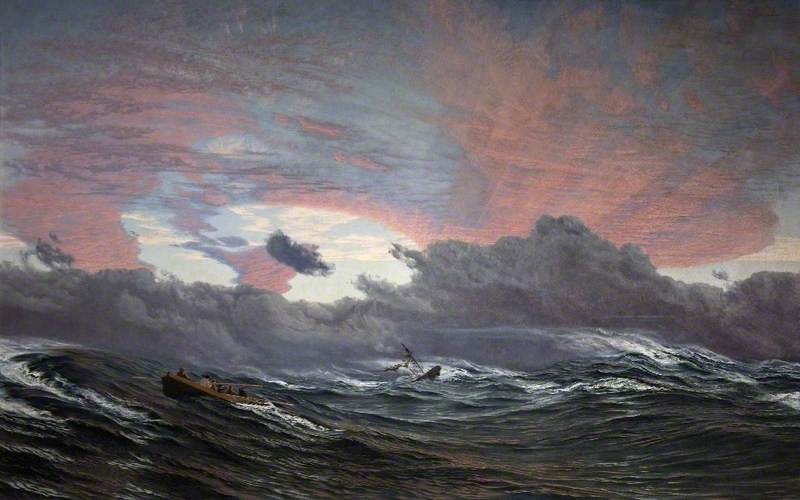
Christmas Morning, 1866 by John Brett

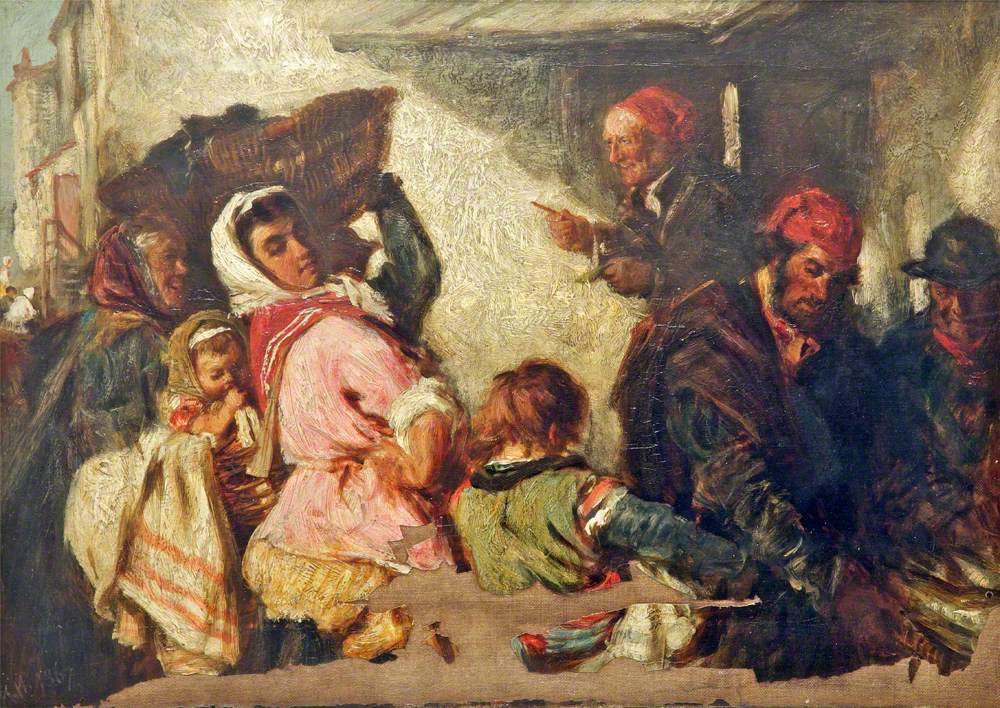
Fish Auction at Newhaven by Keeley Halswelle

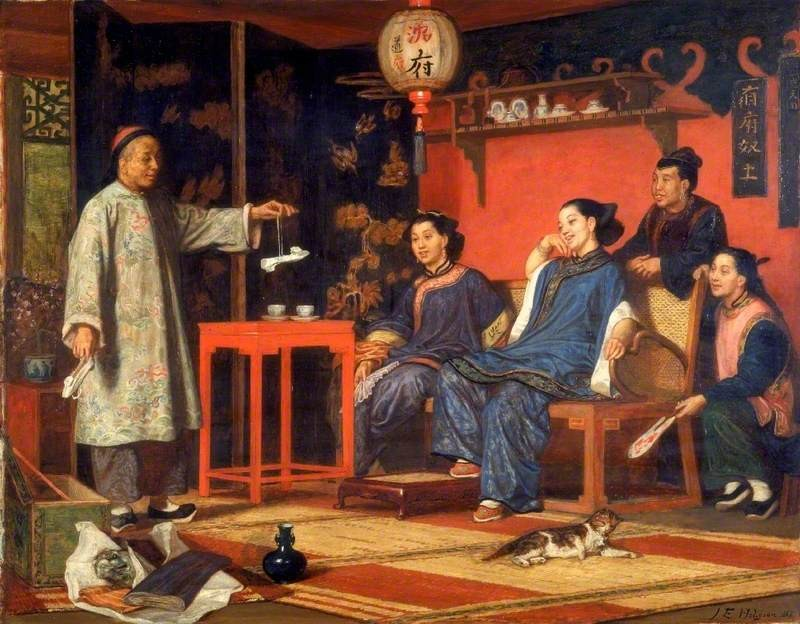
Chinese Ladies Looking at European Curiosities by John Evan Hodgson

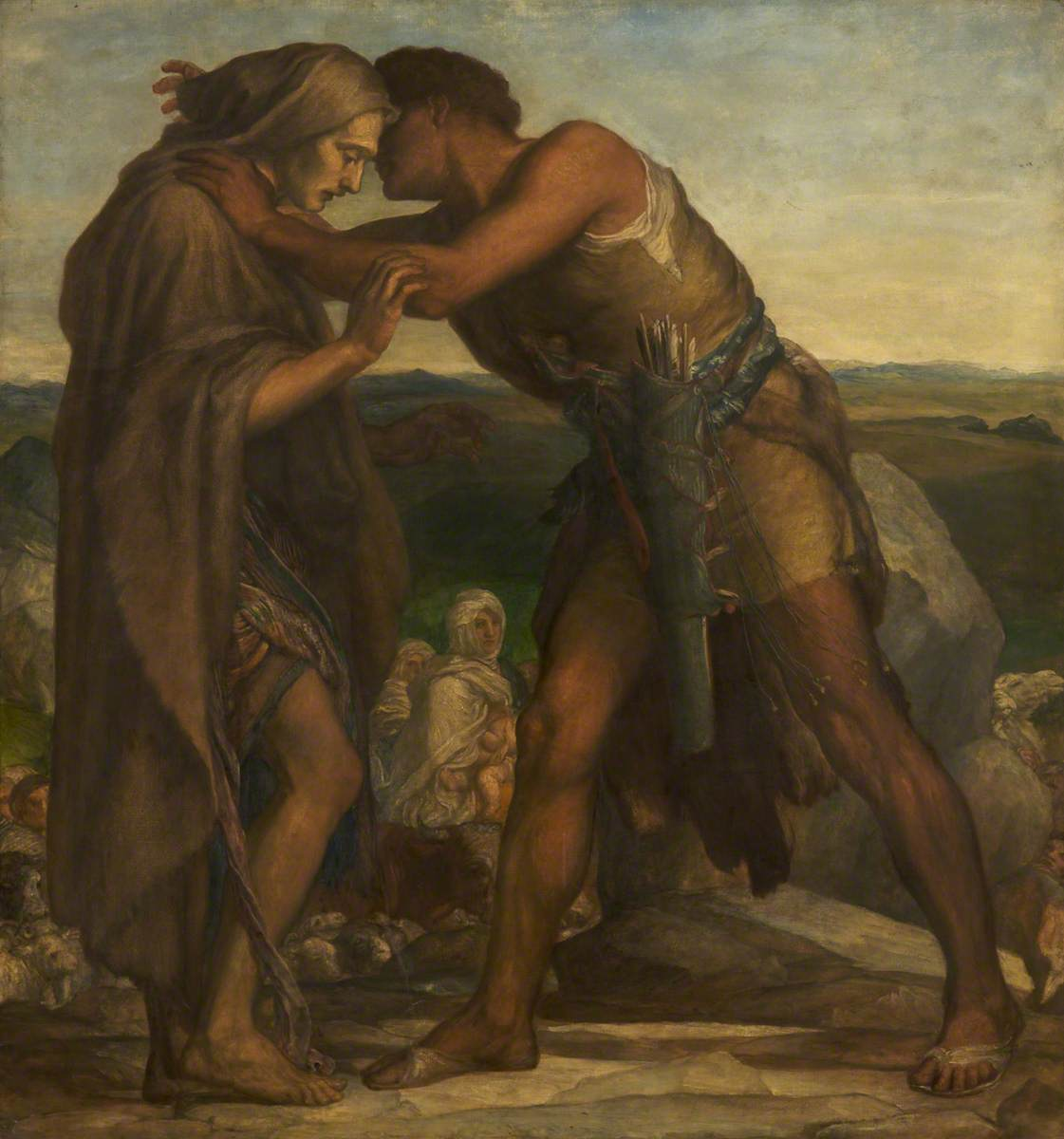
The Meeting of Esau and Jacob by George Frederick Watts

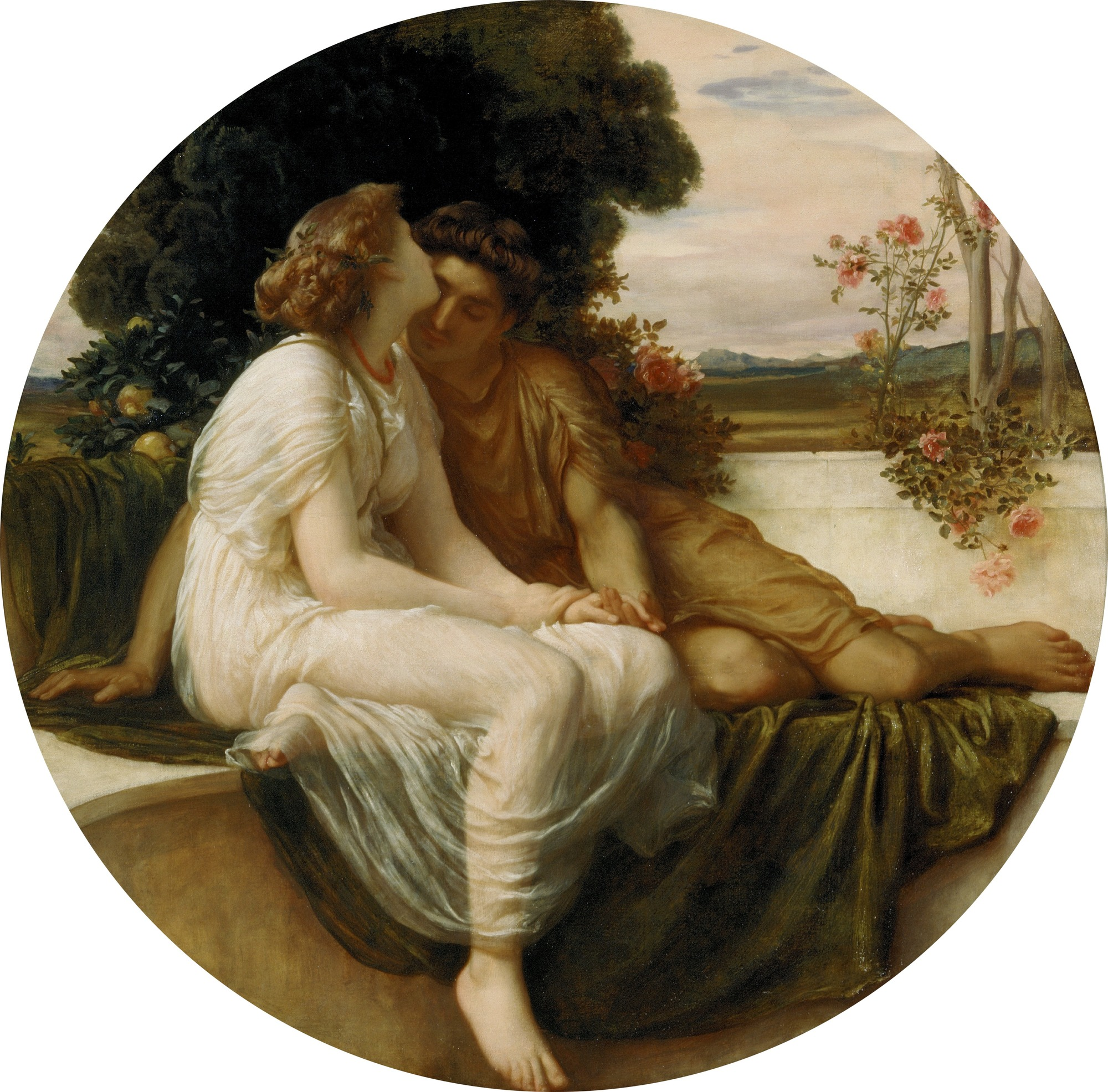
Acme and Septimius by Frederic Leighton

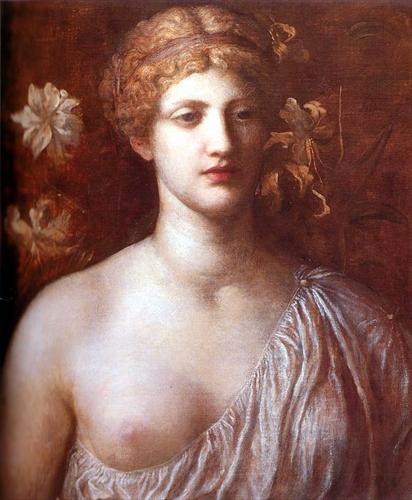
The Wife of Pygmalion by George Frederick Watts

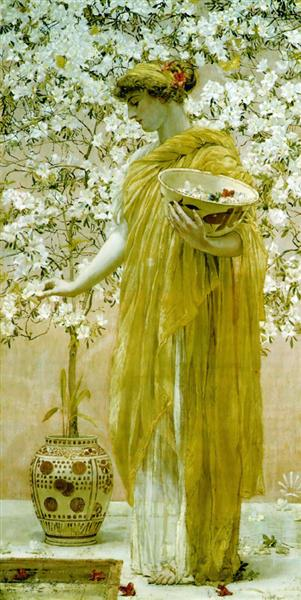
Azaleas by Albert Joseph Moore

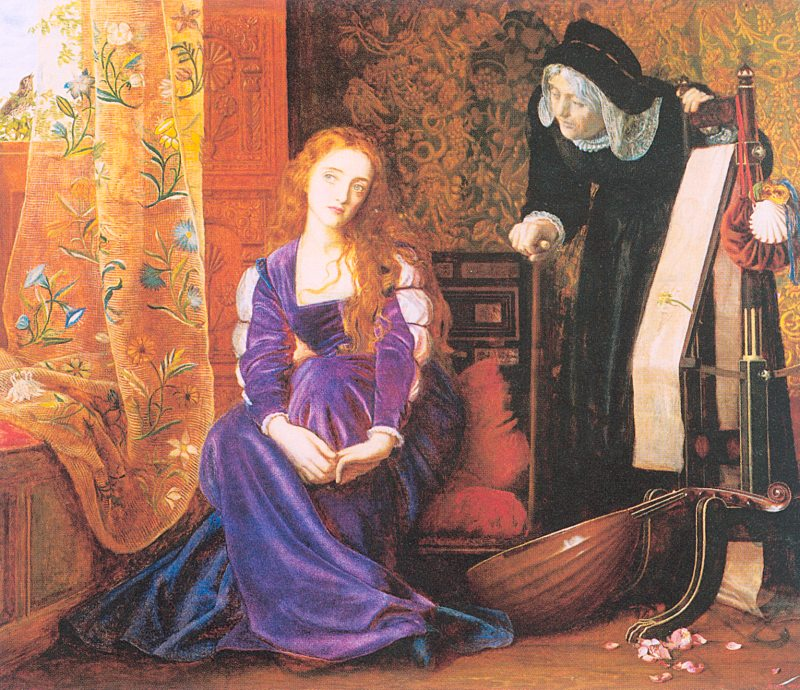
Sigh No More, Ladies, Sigh No More by Arthur Hughes

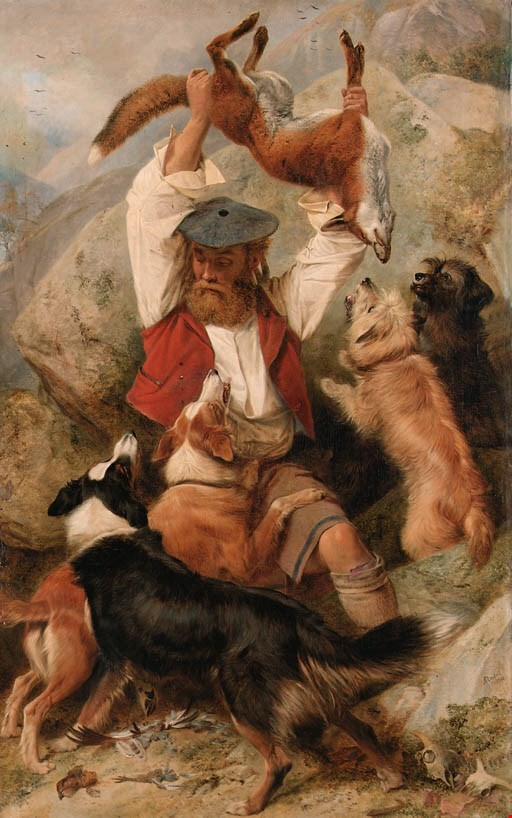
The Shepherd's Revenge by Richard Ansdell

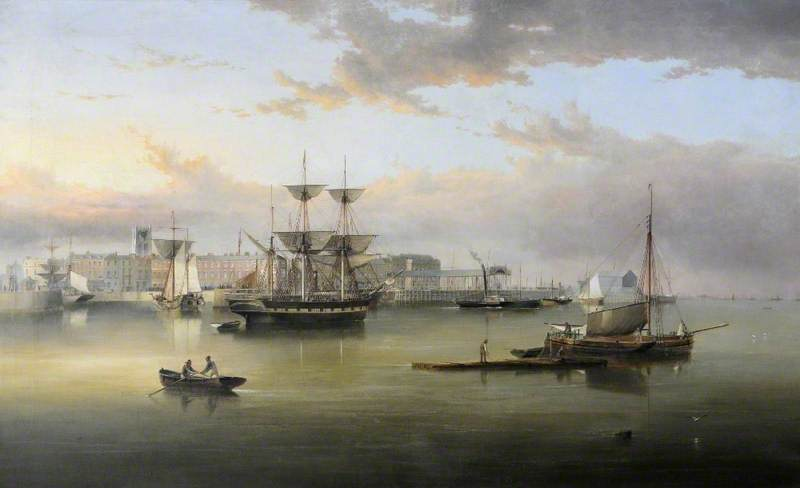
Calm on the Humber by Henry Redmore

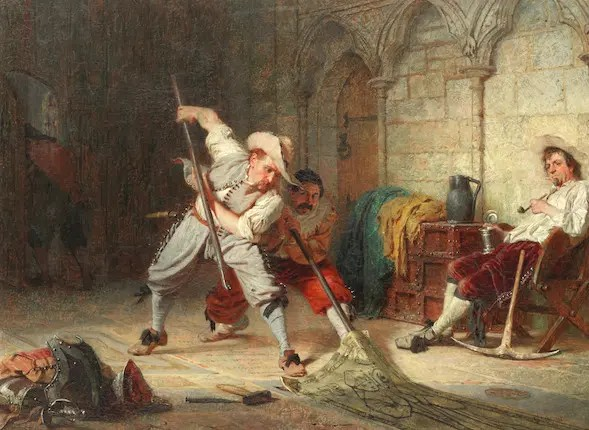
Utilizing Church Metal by George Elgar Hicks

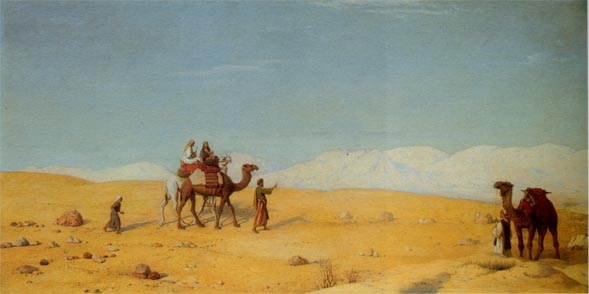
The Valley of Moses in the Desert of Sinai by John Rogers Herbert

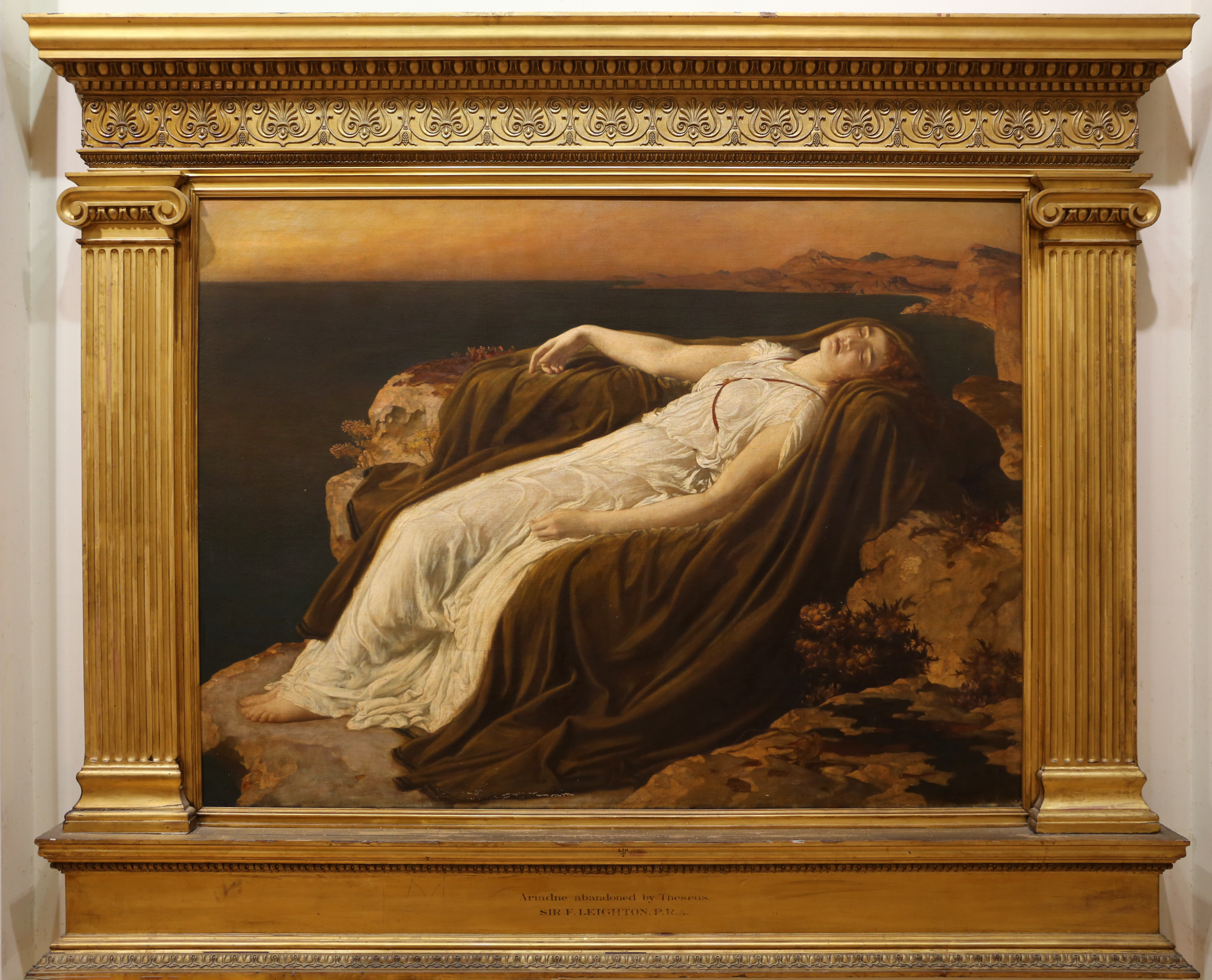
Ariadne Abandoned by Theseus by Frederic Leighton

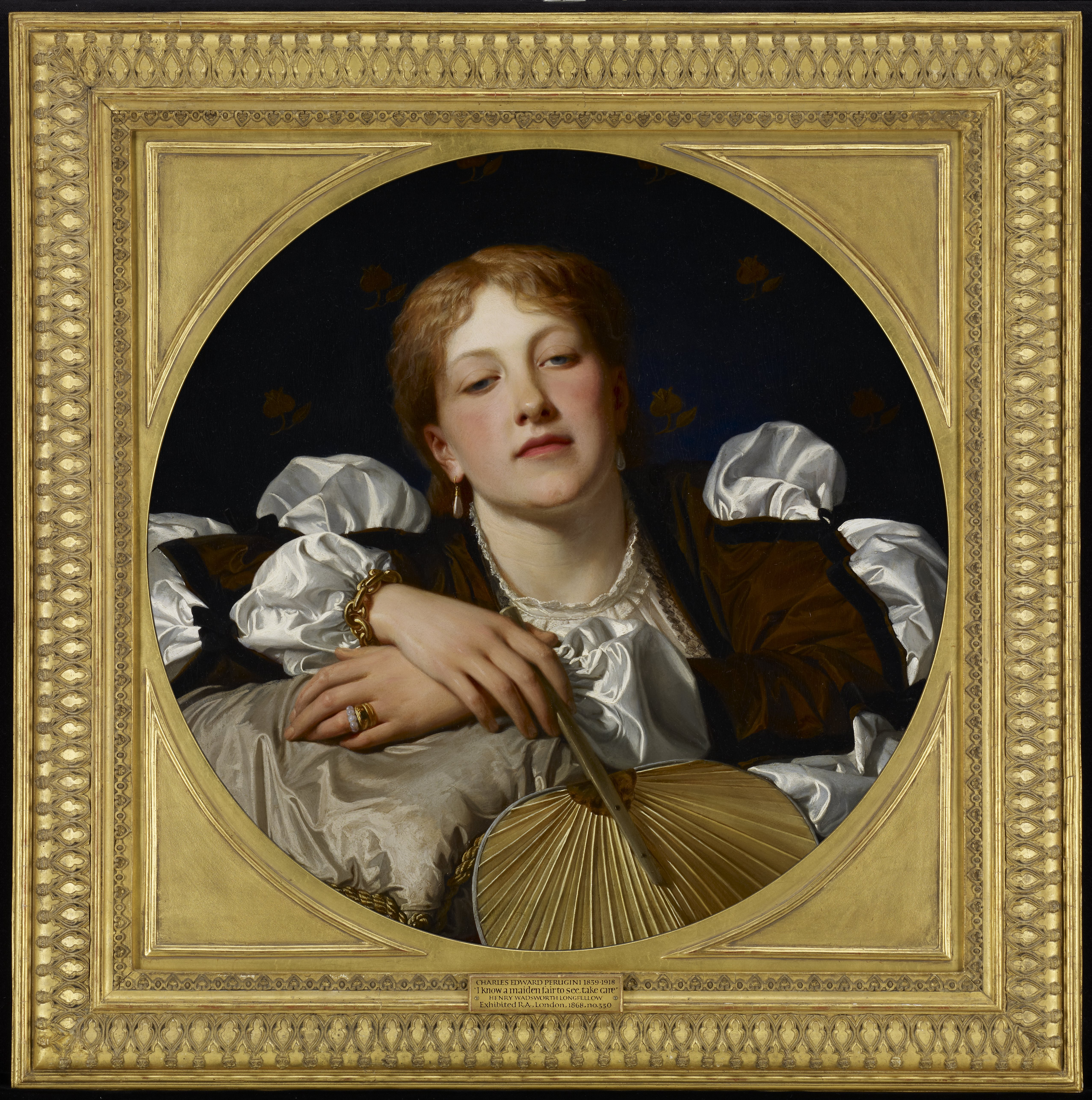
I Know a Maiden Fair to See by Charles Edward Perugini

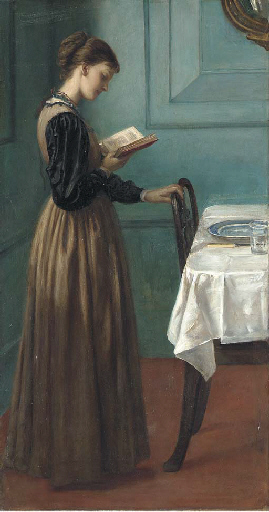
Study of a Girl Reading by Valentine Cameron Prinsep

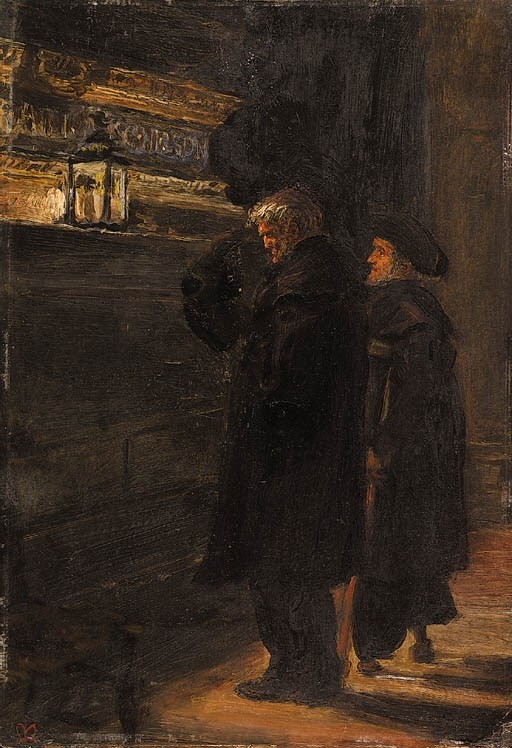
Smaller replica of Greenwich Pensioners at the Tomb of Nelson by John Everett Millais

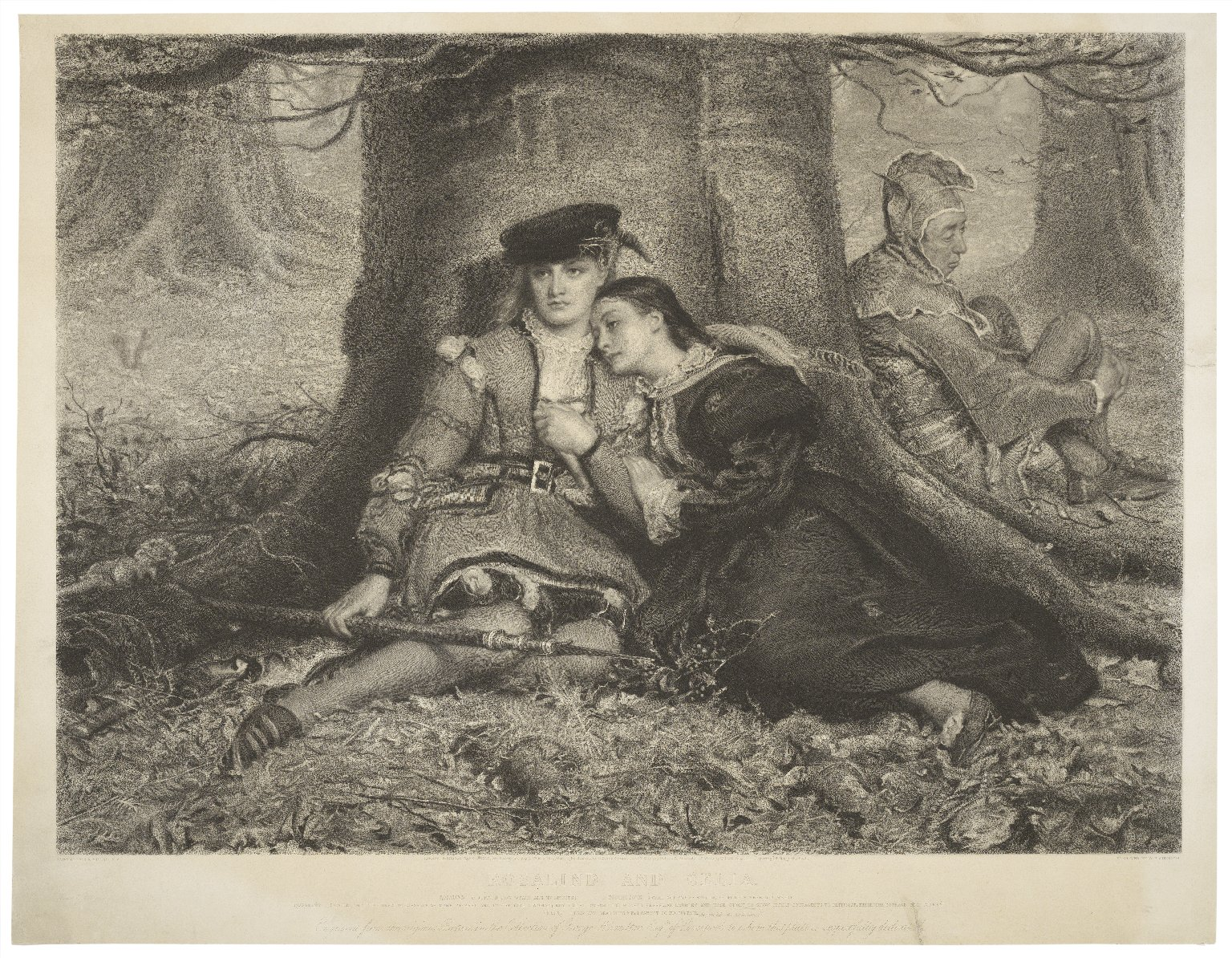
Rosalind and Celia a print based on the painting by John Everett Millais

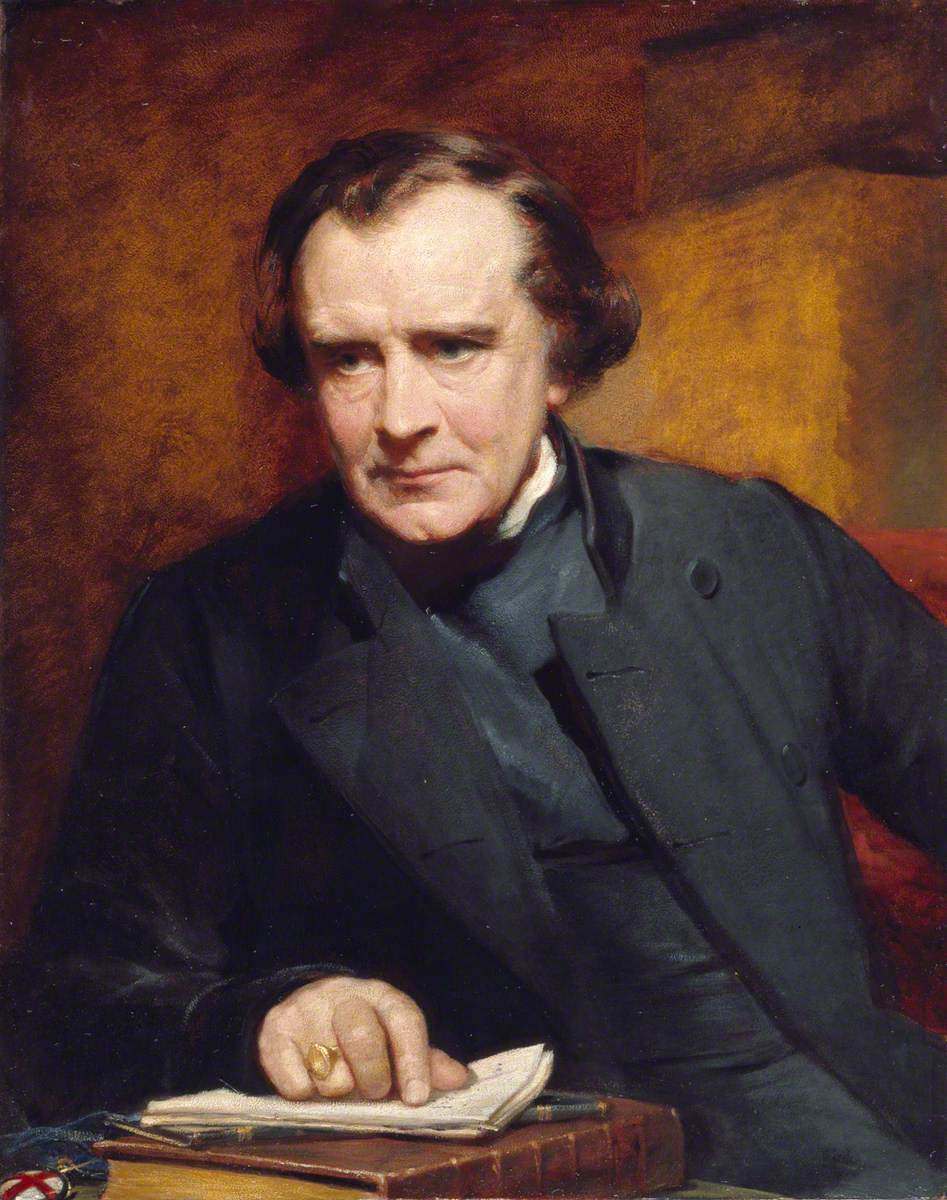
Portrait of Samuel Wilberforce, Bishop of Oxford by George Richmond

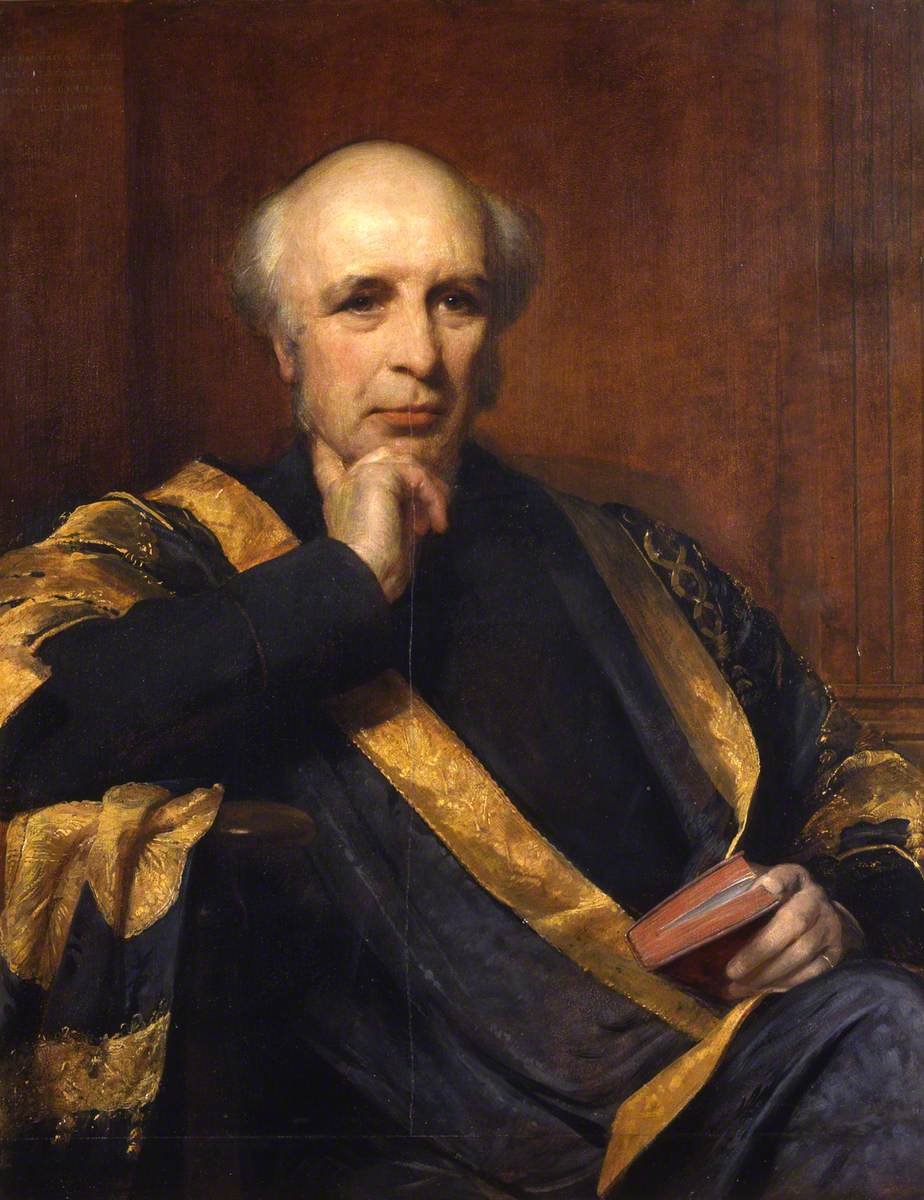
Portrait of Sir Thomas Watson by George Richmond

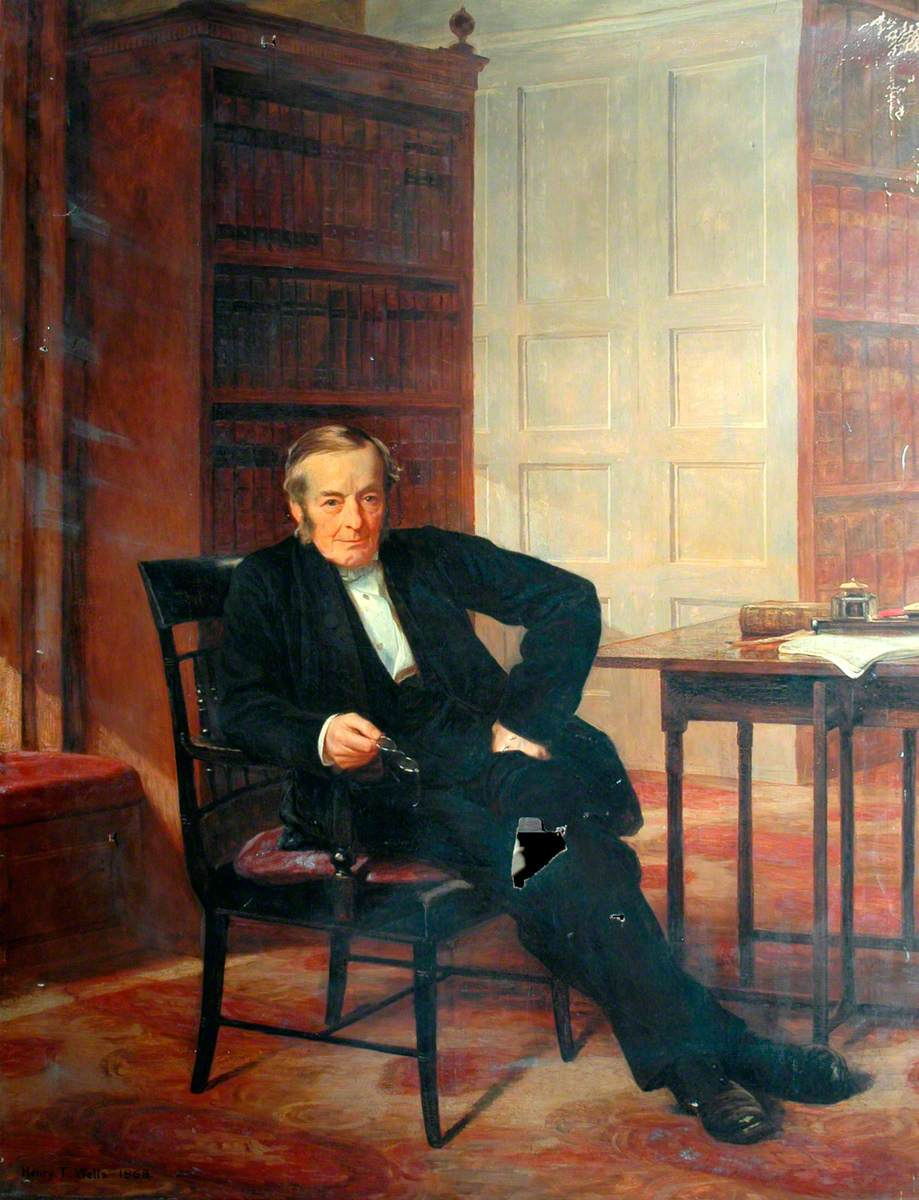
Portrait of James Stansfeld by Henry Tanworth Wells

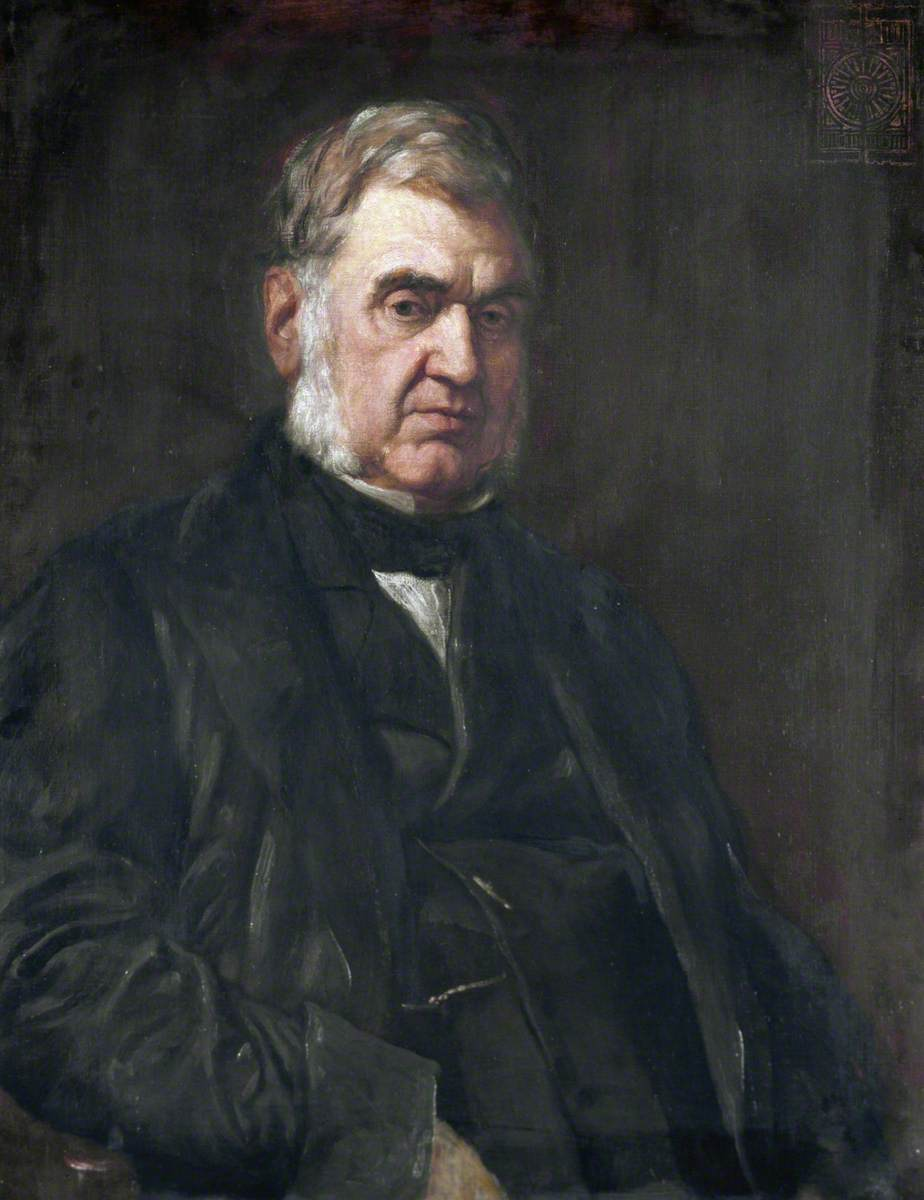
Portrait of Anthony Panizzi by George Frederic Watts

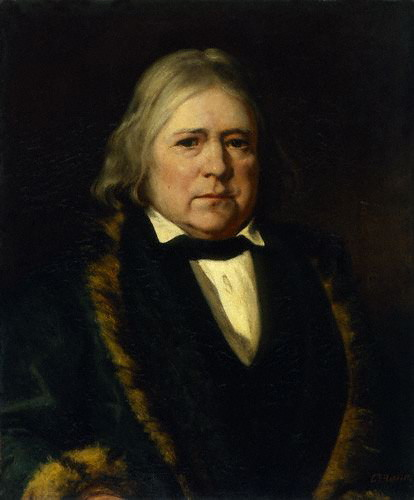
Portrait of William Johnson Fox by Eliza Bridell Fox

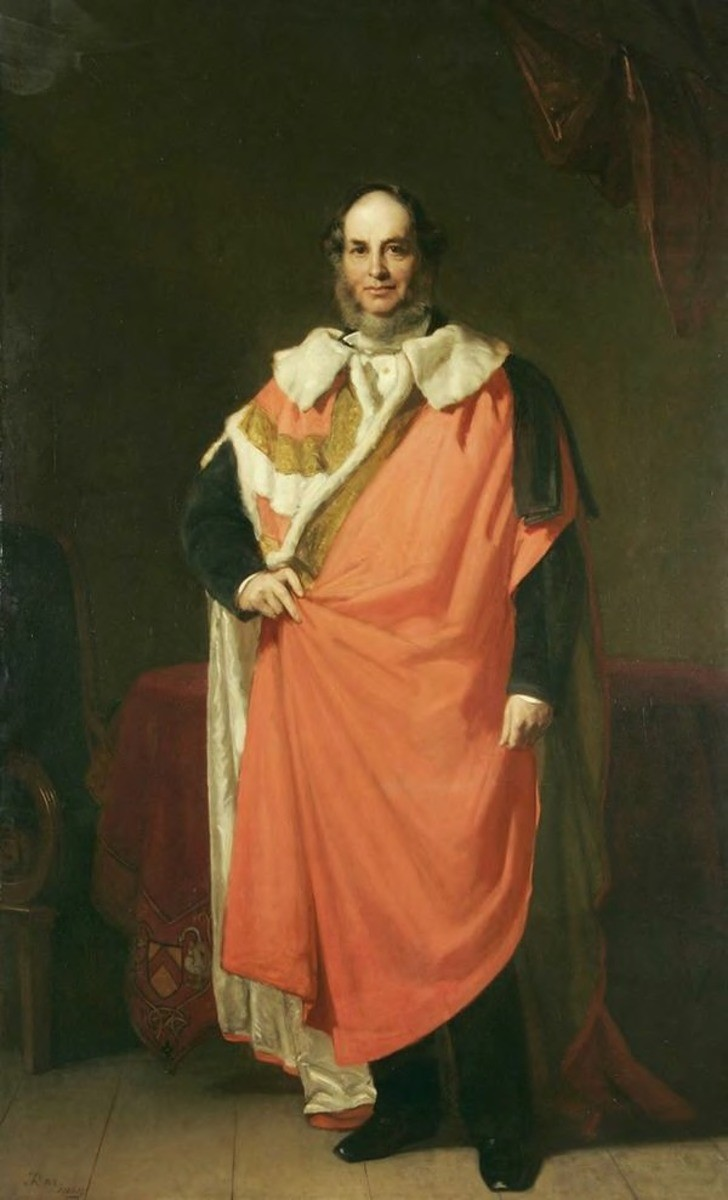
Portrait of Lord Stafford by John Prescott Knight

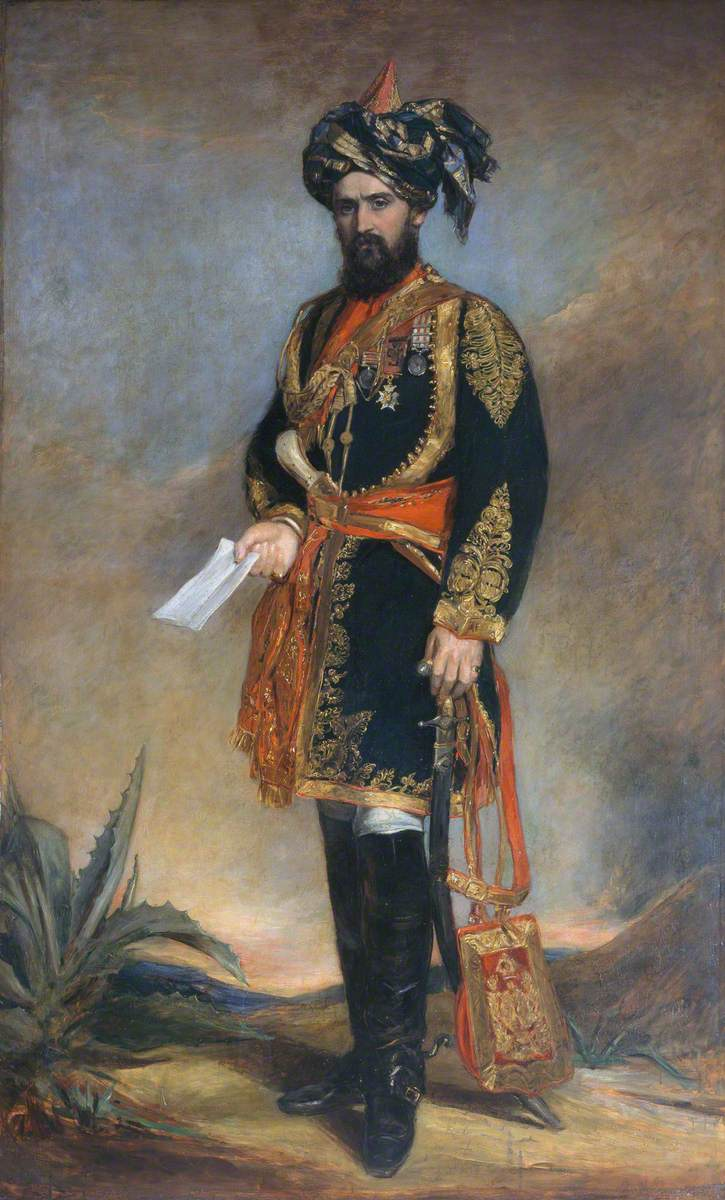
Portrait of Dighton Probyn by James Rannie Swinton

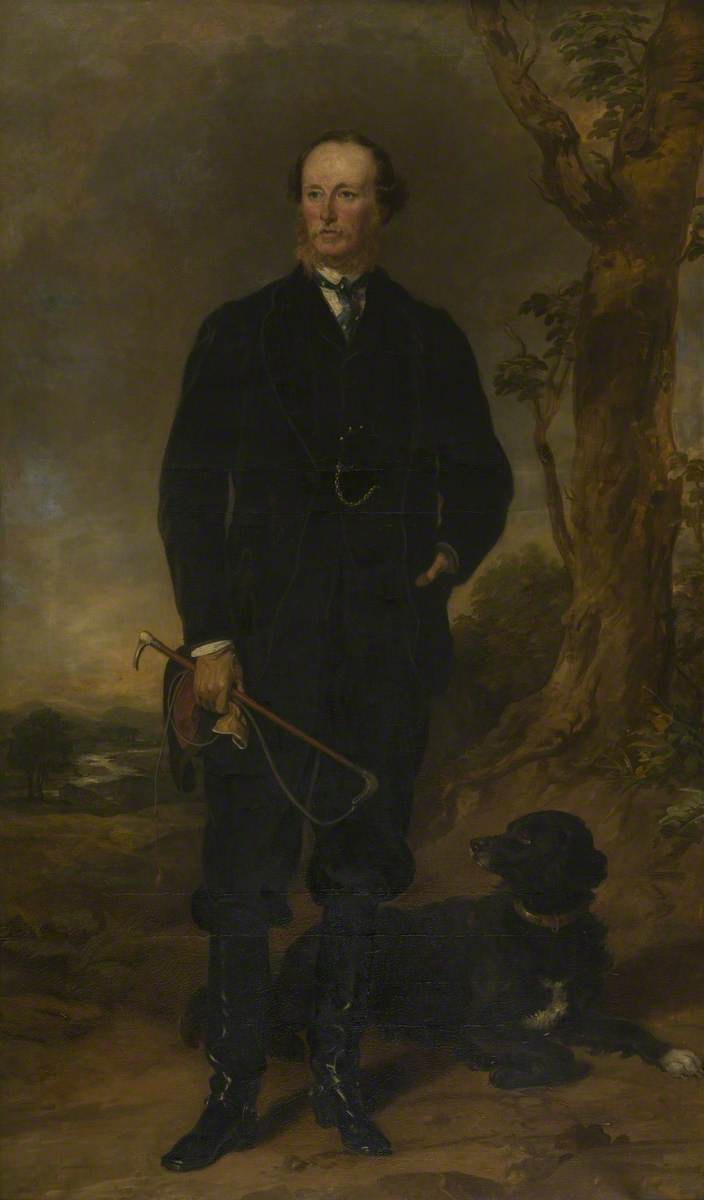
Earl of Bradford by Francis Grant

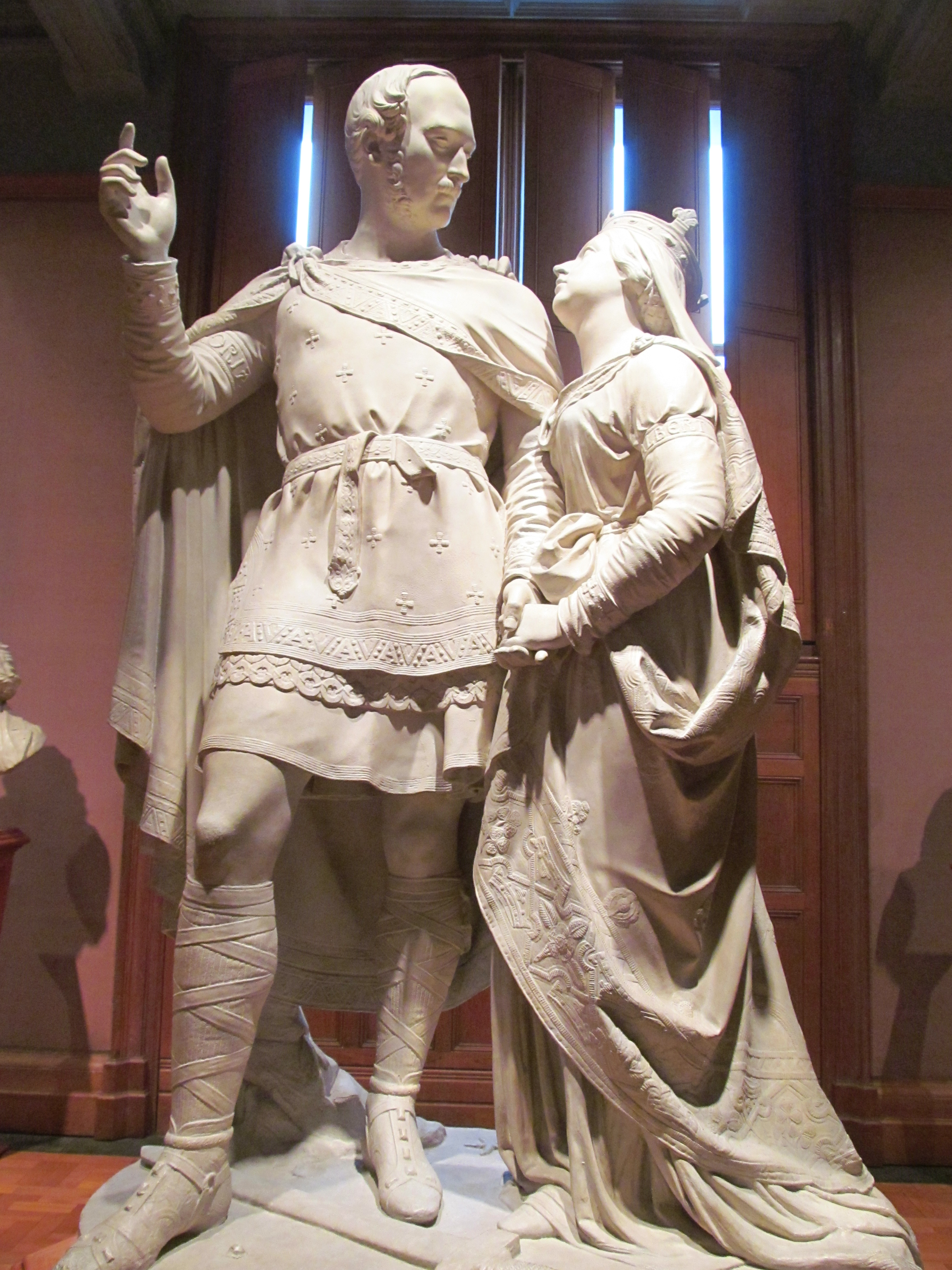
Queen Victoria and Prince Albert by William Theed

== See also ==
- Salon of 1868, an art exhibition held in Paris

== Bibliography ==
- Bartel, Heike. Unbinding Medea. Taylor & Francis, 2016.
- Murray, Peter. Daniel Maclise, 1806–1870: Romancing the Past. Crawford Art Gallery, 2009..
- Harrington, Peter. British Artists and War: The Face of Battle in Paintings and Prints, 1700-1914. Greenhill Books, 1993.
