= Christmas Morning, 1866 =

Painting by John Brett

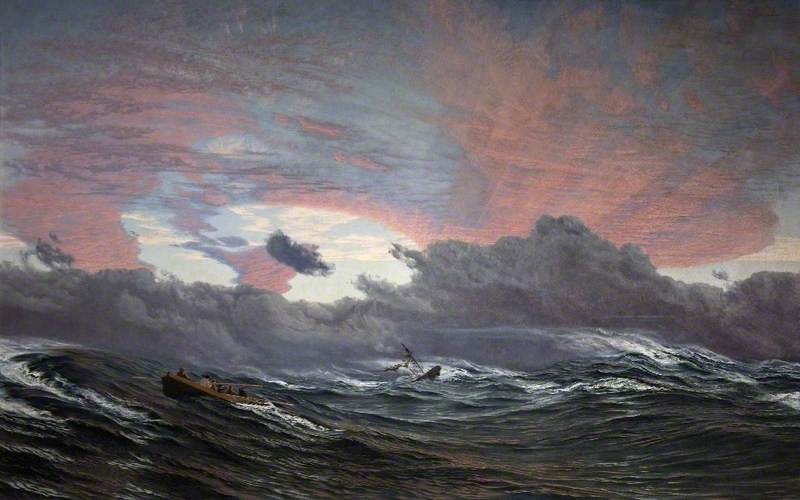
- Artist: John Brett
- Year: 1868
- Type: Oil on canvas, landscape painting
- Dimensions: 151 cm × 241 cm (59 in × 95 in)
- Location: Russell-Cotes Art Gallery, Bournemouth

Christmas Morning, 1866 is an oil painting on canvas by the British artist John Brett, from 1868.

== History and description ==
A seascape, it depicts the sinking of the steamship SS London in the Bay of Biscay with heavy losses. Despite the title it actually sank on the 11 January 1866 while travelling from Gravesend to Melbourne. Brett based the sunset on one he had seen on a visit to Anglesey on Christmas Day of 1865.

Brett was a Pre-Raphaelite artist who specialised in landscape painting. The painting was displayed at the Royal Academy Exhibition of 1868 held at the National Gallery in London where it was well-received with the critic William Michael Rossetti noting "this is far the most important painting Mr Brett has produced". It was purchased by the art collector Alfred Morrison for £600. It was later acquired by Merton Russell-Cotes who gave it to the Russell-Cotes Art Gallery in Bournemouth in 1921.

== Bibliography ==
- Brett, Charles, Hickox, Michael & Payne, Christiana. John Brett: A Pre-Raphaelite in Cornwall. Sansom & Company, 2006.
- Dakers, Caroline. Millionaire Shopping: The Collections of Alfred Morrison, 1821-1897. UCL Press, 2025.
- Payne, Christiana. John Brett: Pre-Raphaelite Landscape Painter. Yale University Press, 2010.
