= Acme and Septimius (Leighton) =

Painting by Frederic Leighton

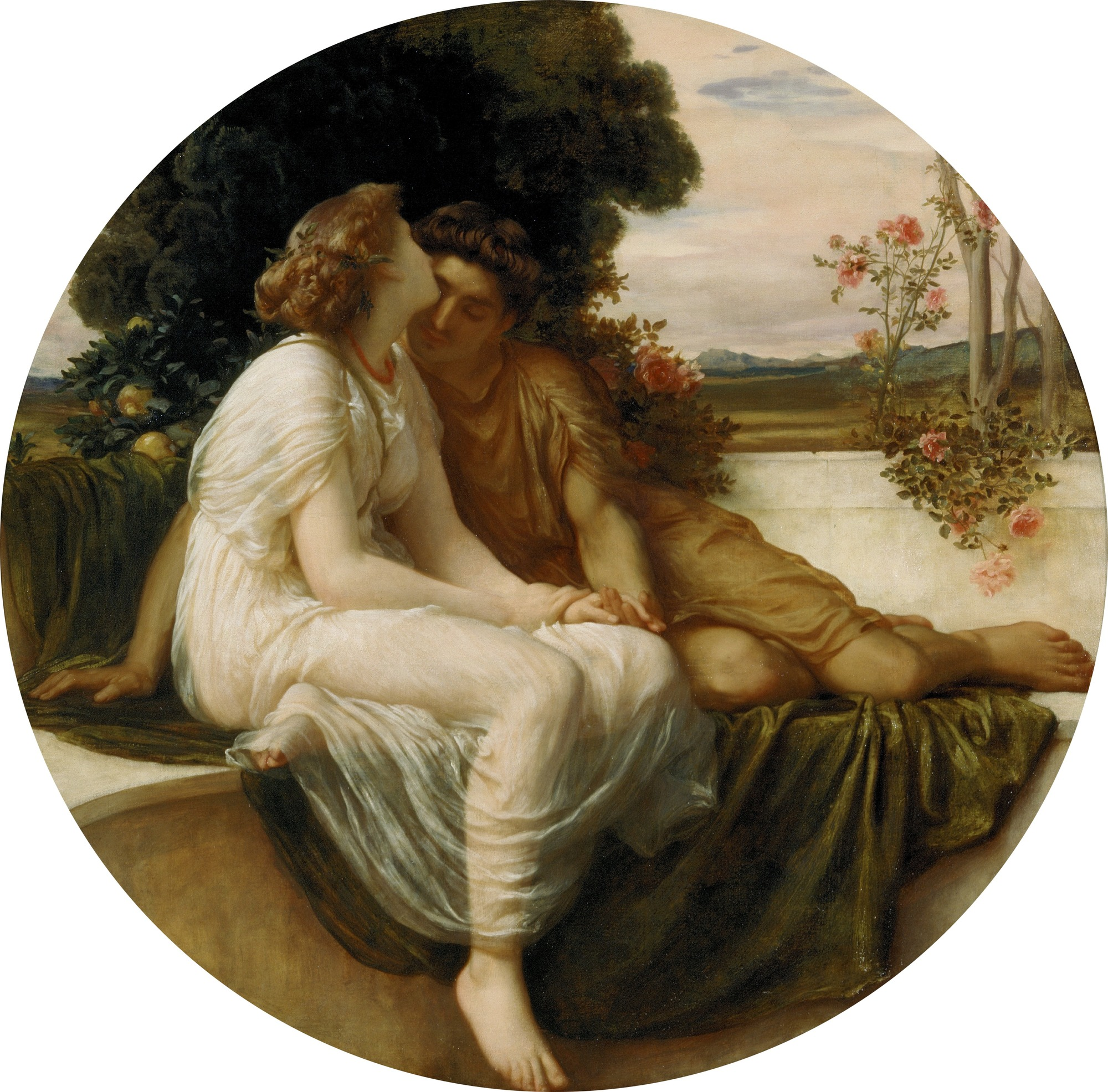
- Artist: Frederic Leighton
- Year: 1868
- Medium: Oil on canvas
- Dimensions: 99 cm diameter (39 in)
- Location: Ashmolean Museum, Oxford

Acme and Septimius is an oil painting by Frederic Leighton, first exhibited in 1868. Leighton took the subject from a love poem by the Roman poet Catullus.

== Background ==
In 1868, Leighton was elected Royal Academician, and the Royal Academy Exhibition of 1868 had six contributions from his palette which fixed his reputation. His style bore the strong influence of his recent visits to Greece, and projected new visions of themes which had attracted him in childhood. Acme and Septimius was perhaps the most popular picture of the year in England.

== Description ==
Acme and Septimius is a circular picture, with two small full-length figures reclining on a marble bench. This extract from Sir Theodore Martin's translation of Catullus 45 was appended to its title in the Royal Academy catalogue:

Then bending gently back her head,
With that sweet mouth so rosy red,
Upon his eyes she dropped a kiss,
Intoxicating him with bliss.

== Sources ==
- Jones, Stephen, et al. (1996). Frederic Leighton, 1830–1896. Royal Academy of Arts, London: Harry N. Abrams, Inc. pp. 63, 78, 119, 159–60, 166, 233.
- Rhys, Ernest (1900). Frederic Lord Leighton: An Illustrated Record of his Life and Work. London: George Bell & Sons. pp. 25–26, 124.
- Staley, Edgcumbe (1906). Lord Leighton of Stretton. London: The Walter Scott Publishing Co., Ltd.; New York: Charles Scribner's Sons. pp. 75–76.
