= Armitage (surname) =

Armitage is a surname. It may originate from West Yorkshire, England, during the Anglo-Saxon period.

== Persons ==
Notable people with the name include:

- Alan Armitage (born 1930), English cricketer
- Albert Armitage (1864–1943), Scottish explorer
- Alison Armitage (born 1965), British actress
- Allan Armitage (born 1946), American professor of horticulture
- Arnold Armitage (1899–1991), British-American artist and illustrator
- Bernard Armitage (1890–1976), English physician
- Catharine Armitage (1944–2020), British painter
- Cecil Hamilton Armitage (1869–1933), British colonial administrator in West Africa
- Charles Armitage (1849–1917), English cricketer
- Charles Armitage (1917–1998), British Army officer
- General Charles Clement Armitage (1881 - 1973), British Army officer
- David Armitage (disambiguation), multiple people, including:
  - David Armitage (historian) (born 1965), British historian
  - David Armitage (footballer) (born 1988), Australian footballer
  - David Armitage Bannerman (1886–1979), British ornithologist
- Delon Armitage (born 1983), English rugby union footballer
- Edward Armitage (1817–1896), English painter
- Edward Liddall Armitage (1887–1967), English stained glass artist
- Edward Armitage (cricketer) (1891–1957), English cricketer
- Elkanah Armitage (1794–1876), English industrialist
- Ethel Armitage (1873–1957), British archer
- Flora Anne Armitage (1911–1995), British-born American biographer and novelist
- Frank Armitage (1924–2016), Australian-born American painter and muralist for Disney
- George Armitage (1942–2025), American film director, screenwriter and producer
- George Armitage (footballer) (1898–1936), English footballer
- Goody Armitage (fl 1643), American innkeeper
- Guy Armitage (born 1991), English rugby union player
- Harry Armitage (1901–1973), English footballer
- Heather Armitage (born 1933), British athlete
- Iain Armitage (born 2008), American child actor
- John Armitage (disambiguation), multiple people, including:
  - John Armitage (politician) (1920–2009), Australian politician
  - John Armitage (editor) (1910–1980), British editor of Encyclopædia Britannica
- Karole Armitage (born 1954), American dancer and choreographer
- Ken Armitage (1920–1952), English footballer
- Kenneth Armitage (1916–2002), British sculptor
- Lamduan Armitage (1968–2004), formerly unidentified Thai decedent in Yorkshire
- Louis Armitage (1921–2000), English footballer
- Michael Armitage (disambiguation), multiple people, including:
  - Michael Armitage (artist) (born 1984), Kenyan painter
  - Michael Armitage (politician) (born 1949), former Australian politician
  - Michael Armitage (RAF officer) (1930–2022), Royal Air Force commander
- N. Peter Armitage (born 1971), American physicist
- Norman Armitage (1907–1972), American Olympic fencer
- Peter Armitage (statistician) (1924–2024), English medical statistician
- Peter Armitage (actor) (1939–2018), British actor
- Reginald Armitage (1898–1954), British composer, better known as Noel Gay
- Reginald S. Armitage (1892–1955), vice-president of forest company Price Brothers Limited, in Canada.
- Richard Armitage (disambiguation), multiple people, including:
  - Richard Armitage (agent) (1928–1986), English talent agent
  - Richard Armitage (actor) (born 1971), English actor
  - Richard Armitage (politician) (1945–2025), American politician
- Robert Armitage (disambiguation), multiple people, including:
  - Robert Armitage (politician) (1866–1944), British Member of Parliament for Leeds Central
  - Robert Perceval Armitage (1906–1990), British colonial administrator in Africa
  - Robert Armitage (GC) (1905–1982), British bomb disposal expert and George Cross recipient
- Rosemary Armitage (born 1955), Australian politician
- Simon Armitage (born 1963), British poet, novelist and playwright
- St John Armitage (1924–2004) British military officer and diplomat
- Steffon Armitage (born 1985), rugby union footballer
- Steve Armitage (born 1944), English-born Canadian sports reporter
- Thomas Armitage (1824–1890), British physician and founder of the Royal National Institute of the Blind
- Tom Armitage (1848–1922), English cricketer
- Vernon Armitage (1842–1911), English cricketer and lawyer
- William Edmond Armitage (1830–1873), American clergyman

== Fictional characters ==
- Armitage, a character in the novel Neuromancer by William Gibson
- Armitage Hux, general of the First Order in the Star Wars sequel trilogy
- Detective-Judge Armitage, a character in a spin-off from Judge Dredd
- Frank Armitage, character played by Keith David in the film They Live.
- Mrs Armitage, eponymous heroine of a series of books by Quentin Blake
- Arthur Armitage, a character in G. K. Chesterton's short story "The Finger of Stone"
- Henry Armitage, a character in H. P. Lovecraft's story "The Dunwich Horror"
- James Armitage, a character in Arthur Conan Doyle's Sherlock Holmes short story "The Adventure of the Gloria Scott"
- Jake Armitage, a Shadowrunner in the SNES RPG Shadowrun (SNES)
- Naomi Armitage, an android in the anime series Armitage III
- Willy Armitage, an IMF agent in the TV series Mission: Impossible
- The Armitage family are the central antagonists of the 2017 American horror film Get Out.
- Marivel Armitage, a character in the video game Wild Arms 2

== See also ==
- Armitage (disambiguation)
