= Thomas Armitage (disambiguation) =

Thomas Armitage (1824–1890) was a British physician, and founder of the Royal National Institute of Blind People.

Thomas Armitage or Thomas Armytage may also refer to:

- Tom Armitage (1848–1922), English cricketer
- Thomas Armitage (cricketer) (1846–1923), New Zealand cricketer
- Thomas Armitage (died c. 1849), a gun-room steward aboard HMS Terror during Franklin's lost expedition
- Thomas Armitage (clergyman) (1819–1896), American clergyman
- Sir Thomas Armytage, 3rd Baronet (1652–1694) of the Armytage baronets
- Sir Thomas Armytage, 6th Baronet (1673–1737) of the Armytage baronets

== See also ==
- Armitage (surname)
- Armytage, a surname
