= Alice Stanley Armitage =

Irish campaigner for the blind

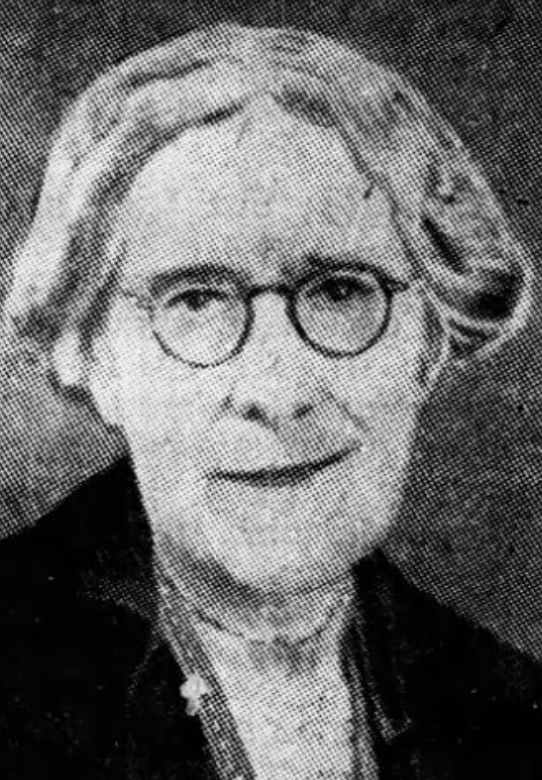
- Born: 24 February 1869; County Tipperary, Ireland
- Died: 30 August 1949 (age 80); Chertsey, Surrey, U.K.
- Organization: National Council for the Blind of Ireland
- Father: Thomas Rhodes Armitage
- Relatives: Edward Armitage (uncle); Robert Armitage (cousin)

Alice Stanley Armitage (24 February 1869 – 30 August 1949) was a campaigner for the blind and principal founder of the National Council for the Blind of Ireland.

== Family ==
Alice Stanley Armitage was born in County Tipperary, the daughter of Thomas Rhodes Armitage and Harriet Black. Her mother was the heiress of the Noan estate, County Tipperary. Her father, a physician who became blind in adulthood, founded the Royal National Institute for the Blind in England. She was the niece of painter Edward Armitage, who painted her portrait in 1891, and the first cousin of politician Robert Armitage.

== Career in philanthropy ==
Armitage was a member of the executive council of the Royal National Institute for the Blind, and established a school for the blind in Zeitoun, Egypt, in 1901, fulfilling her late father's wishes. During and after World War I, she focused on the needs of newly-blind veterans.

She was the principal founder and first president of the National Council for the Blind of Ireland when it was established in 1931, under the original name of the National Council for the Welfare of the Blind of Ireland. Her small but lavish acts of generosity, involving chocolates, strawberries, theatre tickets, or other treats, were fondly recalled.

== Death and legacy ==
Armitage was deaf in her later years, and lived sparely, devoting all her available resources to her causes; she died on 30 August 1949 in Chertsey, Surrey, at the age of 80. The Armitage Memorial Fund, benefiting blind causes in Ireland, was established in her memory. Armitage House, the expanded headquarters of the National Council for the Blind of Ireland, opened in the late 1960s. A plaque was unveiled to a number of the Armitage family members involved in advocacy for the blind and partially sighted at Magorban Church, Cashel in 2006. Edward Armitage's portrait of Alice Stanley Armitage is in the collection of the University of Limerick.

Her niece Doris Mary Rhodes Armitage (1900–1979) was later president of the National Council for the Blind of Ireland.
