= John Armytage (disambiguation) =

Sir John Armytage, 2nd Baronet (1629–1677) was a British politician.

John Armytage may also refer to:

- Jack Armytage (1872–1943), Canadian ice hockey player
- Sir John Armytage, 4th Baronet (1653–1732) of the Armytage baronets
- Sir John Lionel Armytage, 8th Baronet (1901–1983) of the Armytage baronets
- Sir (John) Martin Armytage, 9th Baronet (born 1933) of the Armytage baronets

== See also ==
- John Armitage (disambiguation)
- Armytage
