= Armatage =

Armatage can refer to:

== People ==
- John Armatage

== Places ==
- Armatage, Minneapolis, Minnesota

== See also ==
- Armitage (disambiguation)
