= George Armitage (disambiguation) =

George Armitage (1942–2025) was an American film director.

George Armitage may also refer to:

- George Armitage (footballer) (1898–1936), English footballer

== See also ==
- George Armytage (disambiguation)
- Armitage (surname)
