= Farnley Hall Park =

Park in Leeds, West Yorkshire, England

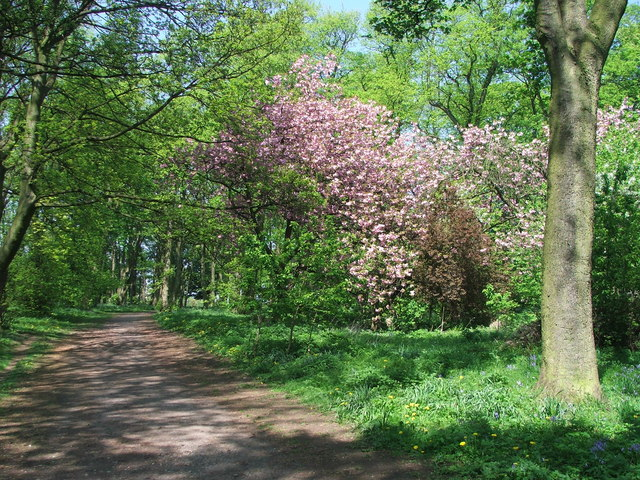
- Blossom at Farnley Hall Park
- Interactive map of Farnley Hall Park
- Location: Farnley, Leeds, West Yorkshire
- Coordinates: 53.786°N 1.626°W
- Area: 16 hectares (40 acres)
- Operator: Leeds City Council

Farnley Hall Park is a park in Farnley, Leeds, England, approximately four miles from the city centre. Sixteen hectares in size, it lies in the grounds of Farnley Hall and hosts the main base of Leeds City Parks.

The park's attractions include areas of open grassland, natural woodland, formal gardens, a playground and football and rugby pitches
