= Robert Armitage =

Robert Armitage may refer to:

- Robert Armitage (politician) (1866–1944), British Member of Parliament for Leeds Central
- Robert Perceval Armitage (1906–1990), British colonial administrator in Africa
- Robert Armitage (Royal Navy officer) (1905–1982), British bomb disposal expert and George Cross recipient
- Robert Armitage (cricketer) (1955–2000), South African cricketer
