= John Armitage =

John Armitage may refer to:

- John Armitage (architect) (1874–1953), British architect
- John Armitage (banker) (born 1959), British hedge fund manager
- John Armitage (politician) (1920–2009), Australian politician
- John Armitage (editor) (1910–1980), British editor of Encyclopædia Britannica
- Jack Armitage (1897–?), English footballer

== See also ==
- John Armytage (disambiguation)
- Armitage (surname)
