= George Armytage =

George Armytage may refer to:

- George Armytage (politician) (1734–1783), British politician and the third of the Armytage baronets
- George Armytage (grazier) (1795–1862), grazier in Australia
- Sir George Armytage, 5th Baronet (1660–1736) of the Armytage baronets in the Baronetage of England
- Sir George Armytage, 4th Baronet (1761–1836) of the Armytage baronets
- Sir George Armytage, 5th Baronet (1819–1899) of the Armytage baronets
- Sir George John Armytage, 6th Baronet (1842–1918) of the Armytage baronets
- Sir George Ayscough Armytage, 7th Baronet (1872–1953) of the Armytage baronets

== See also ==
- George Armitage (disambiguation)
- Armytage
