= Paul Feiler =

German artist

Paul Ludwig Horst Feiler (30 April 1918 – 8 July 2013) was a German-born artist who was a prominent member of the St Ives School of art: he has pictures hanging in major art galleries across the world.

== Early life ==
Paul Feiler was born in 1918 in Frankfurt-am-Main, Germany into a cultivated family of lawyers, doctors and liberal politicians; his father was a professor of dentistry. He was educated in Zwolle in the Netherlands and then at Canford School in Dorset, England.

His parents in 1936 moved to London: his father established himself as a dentist in Harley Street. Paul studied at the Slade School of Fine Art in London 1936–1939 with artists such as Patrick Heron, Bryan Wynter and Kenneth Armitage. As an enemy alien in 1939, although thoroughly anglicised, he was interned on the Isle of Man and then in Canada. On his return to England in 1941, he was an arts teacher at Eastbourne College, which had been evacuated to Radley College in Oxford.

After World War II, he taught art at the West of England College of Art in Bristol: he became the head of painting there in 1960. In 1975 he moved to the disused chapel in Kerris near Newlyn in Cornwall where he would live until his death.

== Artistic career ==
Feiler's first solo exhibition was a sell-out at the Redfern Gallery in London in 1953. He had four more exhibitions there in the 1950s.

The Obelisk Gallery in Washington DC in 1954 had the first of several solo exhibitions across America.

Feiler has paintings in many art galleries worldwide including the Tate St Ives, Victoria and Albert Museum, National Gallery of Art in Washington DC, Bibliothèque nationale de France in Paris, Bristol Art Gallery, Art Gallery of Ontario in Toronto, and Kettles Yard in Cambridge.

The Tate St Ives had two large solo exhibitions of his work in 1995 and 2005. He worked in his Kerris studio every day until his death in 2013 aged 95.

Paul Feiler married the artist June Miles in 1945: they had two daughters and a son – the marriage was later dissolved. In 1970 Feiler married the artist Catharine Armitage: they had twin sons.

== See also ==
- List of German painters
