= Herod's Birthday Feast =

Painting by Edward Armitage

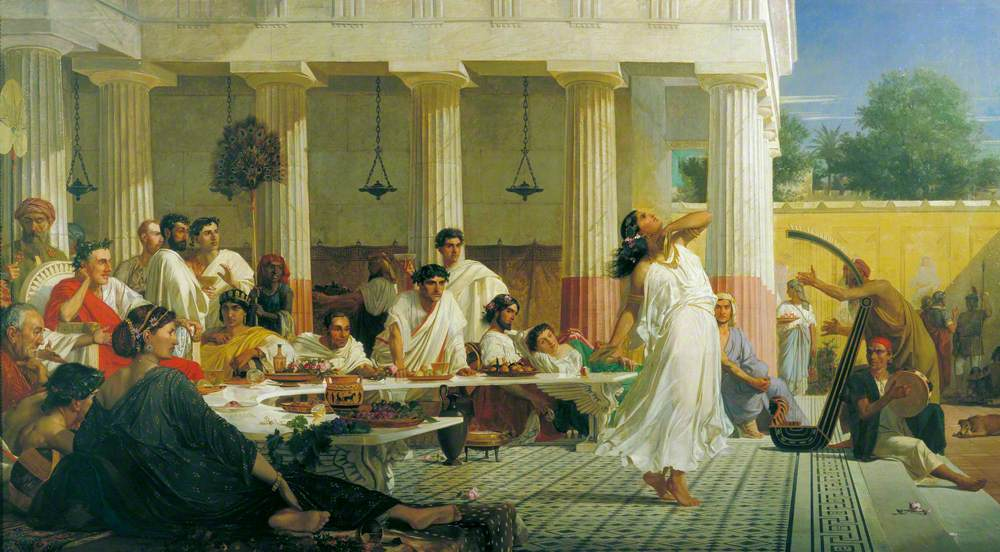
- Artist: Edward Armitage
- Year: 1868
- Type: Oil on canvas, history painting
- Dimensions: 155 cm × 277 cm (61 in × 109 in)
- Location: Guildhall Art Gallery, London

Herod's Birthday Feast is an oil on canvas history painting by the British artist Edward Armitage, from 1868. It is held at the Guildhall Art Gallery., in London

== History and description ==
It depicts a scene from the biblical episode of the feast of Herod, where Salome, the daughter of Herodias, and his niece, is performing the Dance of the Seven Veils before King Herod. In reward to her, the king, even reluctantly, ordered the Beheading of John the Baptist. Salome is seen dancing at a Roman inspired setting, while two musicians play the harp and the tambourine. The people attending, both Herod and Herodias, and the courtesans, are also dressed in Roman inspired clothing. Herod is seen at the left, seated in a throne, with a laurel crown, visibly enticed by his niece dance.

The painting was displayed at the Royal Academy Exhibition of 1868 at the National Gallery in London. It was donated by the artist in 1894 to the city's Guildhall Art Gallery.

== Bibliography ==
- Djaoui, David (ed.) On n'a rien inventé! Produits, commerce et gastronomie dans l'Antiquité romaine. Musées de Marseille, 2019.
- Roe, Sonia. Oil Paintings in Public Ownership in the City of London of London. Public Catalogue Foundation, 2009.
- Ricco, Amedeo (ed.) Holy Land. Archaeology on Either Side: Archaeological Essays in Honour of Eugenio Alliata Ofm. TS Edizioni, 2020.
