= National Council for the Blind of Ireland =

Charitable organization

Vision Ireland (formerly The National Council for the Blind of Ireland)
- Type: Not for Profit
- Founded: 1931
- Headquarters: Drumcondra, Dublin, Ireland
- Key people: Paul Ledwidge, Chairperson; Chris White, Chief Executive Officer
- Revenue: 19,135,122 euro (2020)
- Total assets: 16,846,627 euro (2022)
- Number of employees: 260 – 2018
- Website: www.vi.ie

Vision Ireland (formerly known as the National Council for the Blind of Ireland (NCBI), in Drumcondra, Dublin, is a charitable organisation which provides support and services to people experiencing sight loss in Ireland. Its mission is 'to enable people who are blind and vision impaired to overcome the barriers that impede their independence and participation in society'.

Established in 1931 by Alice Stanley Armitage among others to promote the full independence of people who are blind or vision impaired the NCBI now employs over 160 staff and many volunteers, providing services to more than 55,000 people.

The Vision Ireland headquarters are located in the former Drumcondra Hospital, Whitworth Road, Drumcondra. Vision Sports Ireland, which operates under the Vision Ireland umbrella, is also located there. There is a network of Vision Ireland retail charity shops around the country selling clothing and furniture.
