= Thomas Armitage =

British physician (1824–1890)

Thomas Rhodes Armitage
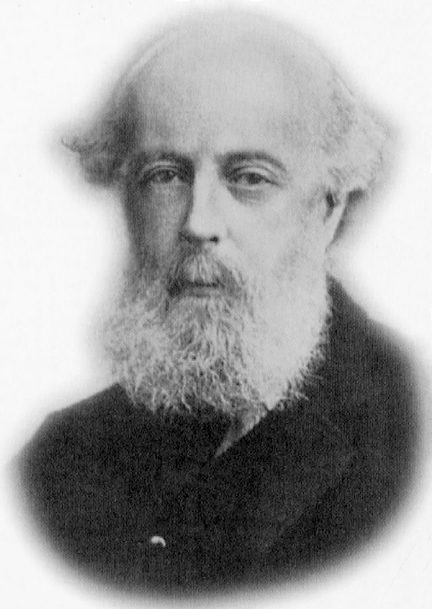
- Born: Thomas Armitage; 2 April 1824; Sussex
- Died: 23 October 1890 (aged 66); Thurles
- Occupation: physician
- Known for: Founder of the Royal National Institute of Blind People

Thomas Rhodes Armitage (2 April 1824 – 23 October 1890) was a British physician, and founder of the Royal National Institute of Blind People.

He was born at Tilgate in Sussex into a family of wealthy Yorkshire industrialists, the son of James Armitage (1793–1872) and Anne Elizabeth Armitage née Rhodes (1788–1833), of Farnley Hall, just south of Leeds, Yorkshire. His great-grandfather James (1730–1803) bought Farnley Hall from Sir Thomas Danby (of the family of Thomas Danby, first mayor of Leeds) in 1799, and in 1844 four Armitage brothers (including his father) founded the Farnley Ironworks, utilising the coal, iron and fireclay on their estate. His brother Edward Armitage was a member of the Royal Academy.

Armitage was the uncle of Robert Armitage (MP), the great-uncle of Robert Selby Armitage, and first cousin twice removed of Edward Leathley Armitage.

He was raised at Avranches in France, and at Frankfurt and Offenbach in Germany. He attended the Sorbonne and King's College London. He became a physician, practising at the Marylebone Dispensary, in the Crimean War, and as a private consultant in London. He was forced to abandon his medical career because of deteriorating vision, eventually becoming blind.

Armitage decided to help make literature available to blind people through embossed type: in Britain this had become complicated by the proliferation of different standards. He formed the "British and Foreign Society for Improving the Embossed Literature of the Blind", later the "British and Foreign Blind Association for Promoting the Education and Employment of the Blind" and (after his death) the "National Institute for the Blind". This group decided to adopt the system of Louis Braille, and Armitage worked tirelessly for the adoption of Braille.

In 1871 he helped to establish the Royal Normal College for the Blind (later the Royal National College for the Blind) in London.

His daughter Alice Stanley Armitage continued his work for the National Council for the Blind and drafted its first constitution.

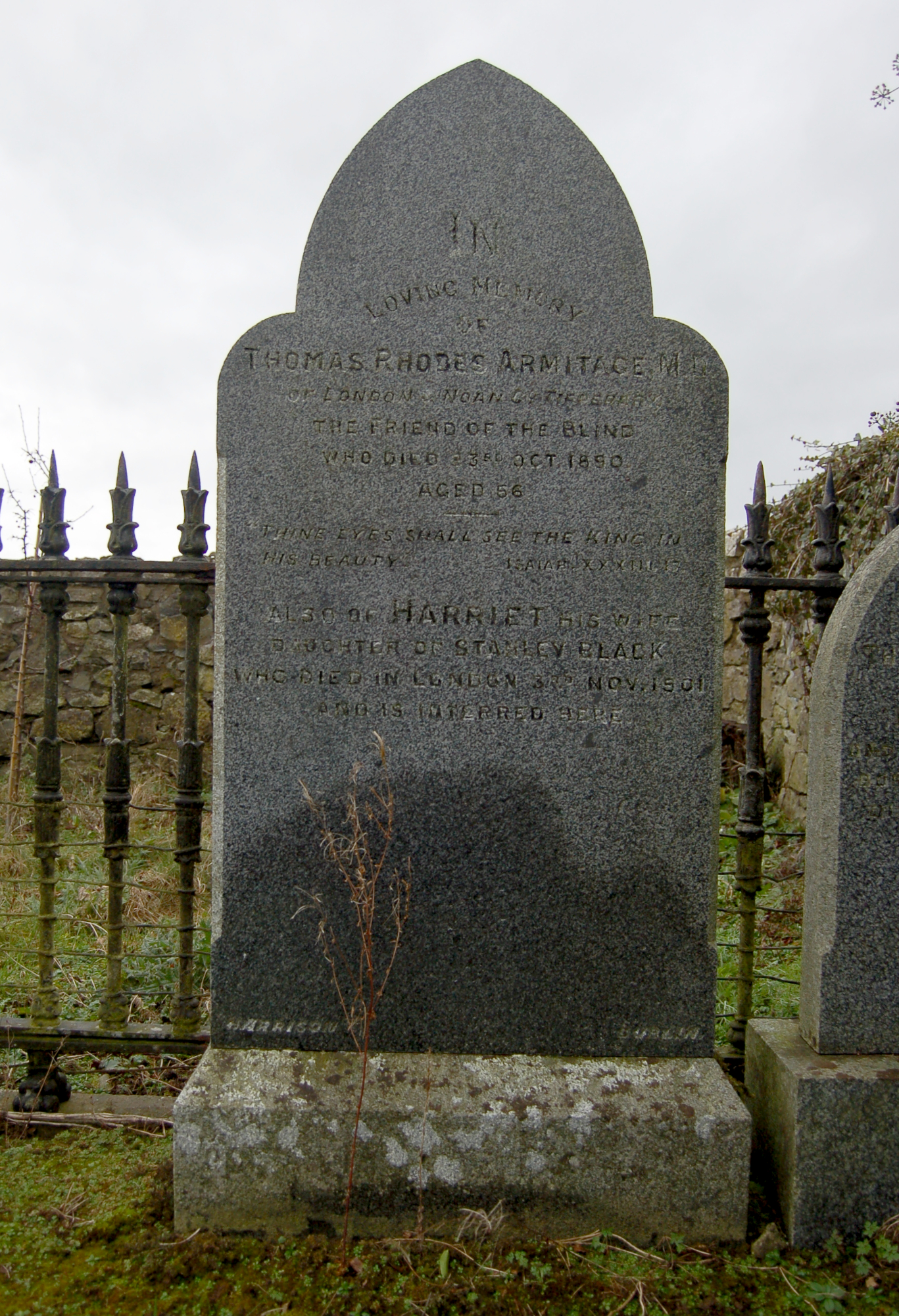
Armitage's gravestone in Margorban

He was married to Harriett Black, and died on 23 October 1890 at Thurles, County Tipperary, Ireland, following a riding accident. He is buried in Magorban, County Tipperary.
