= The Festival of Esther =

Painting by Edward Armitage

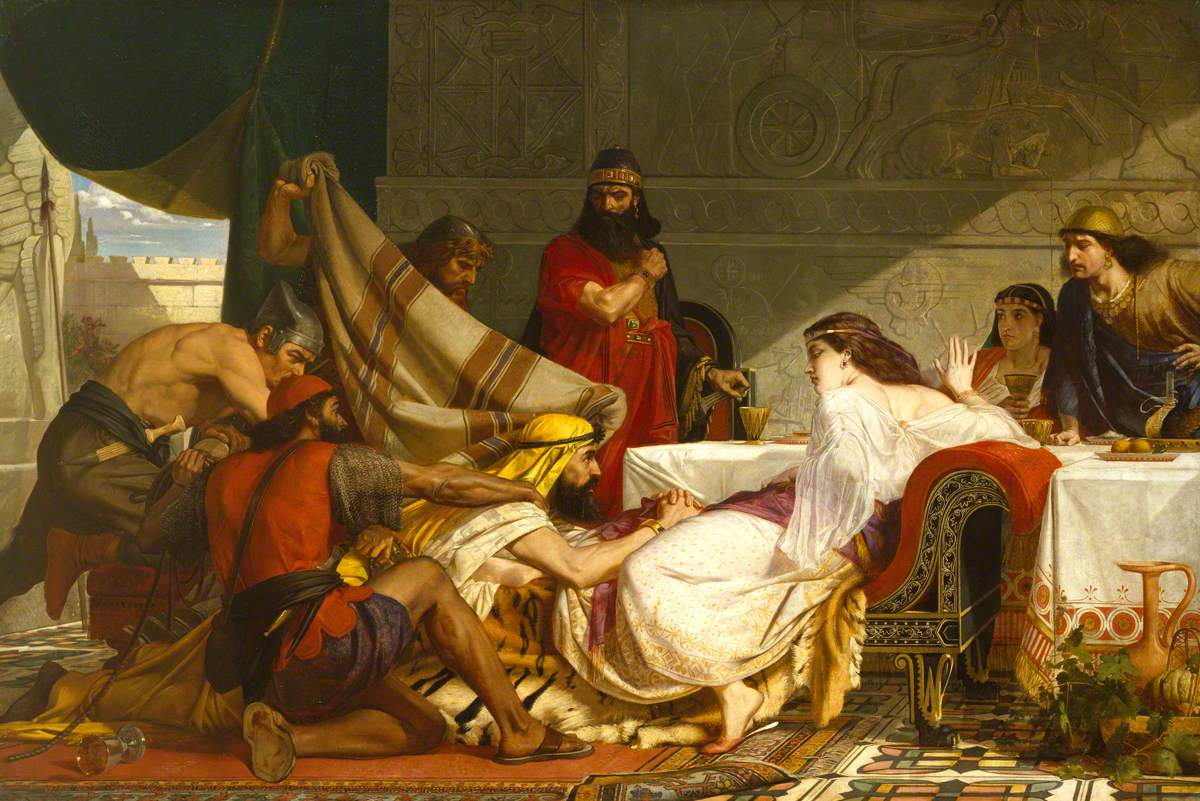
- Artist: Edward Armitage
- Year: 1865
- Type: Oil on canvas, history painting
- Dimensions: 120 cm × 183 cm (47 in × 72 in)
- Location: Royal Academy of Arts, London

The Festival of Esther is an 1865 history painting by the British artist Edward Armitage. It depicts a scene from the Old Testament Book of Esther. Esther the wife of King Ahasuerus of Persia had concealed her Jewish identity from her husband. The king's chief minister Haman drew up a scheme to kill all the Jews, only for Esther to reveal her own identity publicly at a banquet. Armitage aimed for accuracy in the composition, and based many of the details on items from Assyria recently acquired the British Museum.

The picture was displayed at the Royal Academy Exhibition of 1865 held at the National Gallery in London, where it was a success. The Illustrated London News produced an engraving based on it. The painting became one of his best-known works and appeared at numerous other exhibitions including the Exposition Universelle of 1867 in Paris and the International Exhibition held in South Kensington in 1871. When Armitage was elected to full membership of the Royal Academy of Arts in 1873 he was required to submit a diploma work and chose this painting.

== Bibliography ==
- Armitage, Jill R. Edward Armitage RA: Battles in the Victorian Art World. Troubador Publishing, 2017.
- Moser, Stephanie. Painting Antiquity: Ancient Egypt in the Art of Lawrence Alma-Tadema, Edward Poynter and Edwin Long. Oxford University Press, 2020.
