= Listed buildings in Leeds (Farnley and Wortley Ward) =

Farnley and Wortley is a ward in the metropolitan borough of the City of Leeds, West Yorkshire, England. It contains 45 listed buildings that are recorded in the National Heritage List for England. All the listed buildings are designated at Grade II, the lowest of the three grades, which is applied to "buildings of national importance and special interest". The ward includes the area of Wortley a suburb to the west of the city centre of Leeds, and the area of Farnley. The latter is further to the west, and contains the former village of Farnley, the later village of New Farnley to the south, further to the south the settlement of Upper Moor Side, and the surrounding countryside. Most of the listed buildings are houses, cottages and associated structures, farmhouses and farm buildings. The other listed buildings include churches, the cupola of a previous church, surviving buildings of a former textile mill, a public house, schools, and a war memorial.

== Buildings ==
Name and location	Photograph	Date	Notes
Farnley Hall; 53.78735°N 1.62638°W		1586	A main range was added to the country house in about 1806, and the rear wing, which incorporates earlier material, dates mainly from the 18th century. The house is in gritstone with a moulded sill band, a cornice, a blocking course, and a hipped slate roof. There are two storeys, a main range with seven bays, the right bay with a bowed end, and a lower rear wing on the east with twelve bays. The middle bay of the main range projects slightly under a pediment, and has a portico with an entablature on four Doric columns. Above it is a three-light window with pilasters and a cornice, and the other windows are sashes. In the rear wing is a doorway with a rusticated surround and a cornice.
Ings Hall Farmhouse; 53.76974°N 1.63421°W	—	17th century (probable)	The farmhouse is in stone, with quoins, a stone slate roof, two storeys, and three bays. In the centre is a porch, and the windows are casements with architraves. Above the doorway is a single-light window, the other upper floor windows have two lights and mullions, and in the ground floor the mullions have been removed.
Barn, Ings Hall Farm; 53.76978°N 1.63384°W	—	17th century	The barn, which was altered later, is timber framed, with gritstone in the gables and lower side walls, the latter rendered. There are six bays, and an aisle to the north, its posts replaced by brick pillars. The north gable end contains quoins and a loading door.
2 Low Moor Side, New Farnley; 53.77608°N 1.62780°W		17th century (possible)	A house that was later altered, it is in gritstone with a stone slate roof. There are two storeys and three bays. On the front is a gabled porch, and the windows have 20th-century frames.
Barn west of Farnley Hall; 53.78751°N 1.62751°W	—	17th century	The barn is timber framed and was enclosed in red brick in about 1806. It is rendered on the south side, and has a stone slate roof. The barn contains a large segmental-arched cart entrance on the east side with a clock face above, and on the south side is a segmental arch.
Stables north of Farnley Hall; 53.78766°N 1.62662°W	—	17th century	The stables, later used for other purposes, were rebuilt in 1806. The building is in red brick, pebbledashed on the south, with stone dressings, quoins, and a stone slate roof with coped gables and kneelers. There are two storeys, and it contains mullioned windows, inserted garage doors, and two doorways, one with a fanlight.
Guilders Cottage; 53.78212°N 1.63683°W		Late 17th century	The roof of the house was raised in the 18th century. The house is in stone with quoins on the right. There are two storeys, two bays, and a rear outshut. The doorway is in the centre, and the windows are mullioned with two lights.
Lineside Cottage; 53.78203°N 1.63696°W		Late 17th century	Part of a row of cottages combined into one house, it is rendered, with quoins and a slate roof. There are two storeys and three bays. The openings on the front are casement windows, one converted from a doorway.
Beulah Farmhouse; 53.79057°N 1.63432°W	—	Mid 18th century	The farmhouse is in gritstone with a stone slate roof, two storeys and two bays. The doorway to the right of centre has a stone surround, and the windows are mullioned with two lights.
Harper House and barn 53.77787°N 1.61163°W	—	Mid 18th century	The house and attached barn are in stone. The house has quoins, and a stone slate roof with a coped gable and shaped kneeler on the right. There are two storeys and three bays. The central doorway has a plain surround and a fanlight, and the windows are replacement casements with architraves. The barn to the left has an asbestos sheet roof and seven bays, and it contains a segmental-arched cart entry with quoined jambs and voussoirs.
Cupola of old church 53.78533°N 1.62467°W		1761	The cupola is in the churchyard of the Church of St Makarios the Great, and was designed by John Carr. It is in stone and has a polygonal plan. The cupola has segmental arches, a moulded cornice, an ogee dome, and a ball finial.
3 and 4 Low Moor Side, New Farnley; 53.77607°N 1.62797°W	—	Late 18th century (probable)	A pair of cottages, at one time a post office, they are in gritstone, with quoins and a stone slate roof. There are two storeys and three bays. The windows are mullioned, and a loading door has been converted into a window.
5 and 6 Moor Top, Upper Moor Side; 53.77032°N 1.63517°W	—	Late 18th century	A pair of cottages, later combined into one house, it is in stone with a stone slate roof. There are two storeys and two bays. On the front are two lean-to porches, and doorways with architraves, and the windows are sashes.
Balks House; 53.78385°N 1.59002°W		Late 18th century	A house, later divided, it is in red brick, with a sill band, and a stone slate roof. There are two storeys and five bays. The front has a gable treated as a pediment containing a circular window in the tympanum. The central doorway has Tuscan three-quarter columns, a semicircular fanlight, and a pediment, and the windows are sashes.
Plane Tree Farmhouse; 53.77221°N 1.62955°W	—	Late 18th century	The farmhouse is in plastered stone with a stone slate roof, two storeys and two bays. The windows in the left bay are mullioned with three lights, in the right bay are replacement casement windows, and to the right is a modern porch.
Wellholme Farmhouse; 53.77659°N 1.62764°W	—	Late 18th century	The farmhouse is in rendered stone with a stone slate roof, two storeys and two bays. The doorway is in the centre, and the windows are mullioned, with three lights in the left bay and four in the right bay.
Wentworth Farmhouse; 53.77198°N 1.62653°W		Late 18th century	The farmhouse is in stone, with quoins, bands, and a stone slate roof with coped gables. There are two storeys, five bays, and a lower one-bay wing to the right. The doorway has tie-stone jambs, a fanlight, and a keystone, and the windows are sashes.
Wheatfield House; 53.78596°N 1.61840°W	—	Late 18th century	The house, since divided, is in gritstone, with chamfered quoins, a cornice, a parapet, and a stone slate roof. There are two storeys and an attic, and three bays. The central doorway has attached Tuscan columns, a fanlight, and a segmental pediment, and the windows are casements with architraves. At the rear is a tall round-headed stair window, and in the gable ends are round-headed attic windows.
1–4 Moor Top, Upper Moor Side; 53.77040°N 1.63494°W	—	c.1800	A row of cottages, later extended and altered, they are in stone with stone slate roofs. There is one story, and each cottage has one bay. The left cottage has an added porch, and the windows are mullioned, some with sashes and the other with casements.
The Old Mill, Engine House and Boiler House, Stonebridge Mill; 53.79155°N 1.61319°W		c.1800	The former textile mill is in gritstone, partly rendered, with roofs of slate and corrugated sheeting. The main mill building has three storeys and attics, and fronts of seven, eight and nine bays. The engine house to the southwest dates from the mid-19th century, and has a gabled front of three bays. Attached to this is the boiler house with a drying room above, and beyond are two lean-to buildings and a tall square chimney stack.
Garden wall, gazebo, potting sheds and cart shed, Farnley Hall; 53.78731°N 1.62772°W	—	c.1806	The buildings are in gritstone and the roofs in stone slate. The gazebo has two storeys, a square plan, and an eaves cornice. The entrance on the east has tie-stone jambs, a cantilevered hood, flanking small round-headed windows, a blocked window above, and a rectangular panel. On the south front is a large round-arched containing a sash window with pilasters. The adjoining wall has been heightened in red brick, and is about 30 metres (98 ft) long. It contains seven openings with architraves to lean-to outbuildings. The wall to the south is about 80 metres (260 ft) long, and contains a long gabled room, and the cart shed has three bays, and two octagonal stone shafts carrying a lean-to roof.
Cottage and stables, Farnley Hall; 53.78730°N 1.62830°W	—	c.1806	The stables and cottage are in gritstone, with a sill band, and a hipped stone slate roof. There are two storeys and three bays, the middle bay projecting under a pediment with a large round-arched window. The building contains two wide stable doors and sash windows, and in the right return is a first-floor door.
6 and 7 Low Moor Side, New Farnley; 53.77617°N 1.62843°W		Early 19th century	A pair of cottages in gritstone with a stone slate roof. There are two storeys, and each cottage has one bay. The doorways have plain surrounds, and the windows are mullioned with three lights, the middle light wider and containing a sash window.
9 Low Moor Side, New Farnley; 53.77621°N 1.62863°W		Early 19th century	A cottage in gritstone with a stone slate roof, two storeys, and two bays. The doorway has a plain surround, and the windows are mullioned with three lights.
Front wall and gate piers, Farnley Hill Methodist Church; 53.78822°N 1.61991°W	—	Early 19th century	In front of the forecourt of the church are gritstone walls, with copings and railings, extending for about 15 metres (49 ft). The gate and end piers have a square section, on a plinth. They are about 2 metres (6 ft 7 in), high, and each has chamfered shafts, a cornice, and a shallow pyramidal capstone.
Highfield House; 53.78472°N 1.58721°W		Early 19th century	The house, later divided, is in stone with a blocking course and cornice, and a hipped slate roof. There are two storeys, three bays, the middle bay projecting slightly, and lower recessed wings. The central doorway has Tuscan columns, a semicircular fanlight, and a pediment. The windows are sashes, and at the rear is a tall round-headed stair window.
Lawns House; 53.78547°N 1.62415°W		Early 19th century	A large house, later used for other purposes, it is in stone with a sill band, and a slate roof. There are two storeys, a front of five bays, the middle three bays projecting under a pediment, and a nine-bay rear service wing with a hipped roof. In the centre of the front is a portico with two Ionic columns and pilasters, and an entablature, and the windows are sashes. In the right return is a porch with a re-set initialled and dated pediment in the centre, and to the left is a round-headed stair window.
Wall, gates and gate piers, Lawns House; 53.78566°N 1.62357°W	—	Early 19th century	The wall enclosing the grounds is in gritstone with rounded coping. The walls curve in to the gate piers at the entrance, and there is another pair of gate piers to the west. The piers are tapering with a square plan and pedimented capstones, and the gates are in iron with fleur-de-lis finials.
The Star Public House; 53.79331°N 1.59433°W		Early 19th century	The public house is in painted brick with stone dressings, a belt course, and a tile roof. There are two storeys and three bays. At the front is a coped gable forming a pediment that contains an oval window. In the centre is a doorway with an architrave, a fanlight, and a cornice, flanked by large windows with pilasters and cornices. The other windows are sashes with wedge lintels.
Farnley Hill Methodist Church and Sunday School; 53.78831°N 1.62001°W		1828	The former church is in gritstone, with chamfered quoins, a sill band, and a hipped slate roof. There are two storeys and a basement, a front of five bays and sides of three bays. Projecting from the outer bays are single-storey porches with cornices and blocking courses. The doorways face inwards and have moulded surrounds and fanlights, and on the front are round-arched windows. The windows on the body of the church are flat-headed sashes. Attached to the front on the right, with the front projecting, is the Sunday school, that has two storeys, and a Venetian window in each floor. Steps lead up to a doorway in the upper floor with a Venetian window to the left.
The Metre House and two cottages to the south-west of Stonebridge Mill; 53.79119°N 1.61328°W	—	c.1830	The buildings are in red brick with stone dressings and slate roofs. There are two storeys and four bays. They contain doorways and windows, some of the latter are sashes and the others are casements. All the windows have segmental heads.
Row of three cottages northwest of Stonebridge Mill; 53.79210°N 1.61221°W	—	c.1830	The third cottage was added in the mid-19th century. The cottages are in gritstone, with stone slate roofs, and three storeys. Most of the windows in the earlier cottages are sashes, and in the later cottage are casements.
Row of workshops north of Stonebridge Mill; 53.79194°N 1.61321°W		c.1830	A row of workshops and offices, they are in red brick and stone, partly rendered, with roofs of slates and pantiles. The press room has two storeys and six bays, the office to the right has a lean-to roof, and the storeroons have two storeys and a basement.
Cliff House; 53.78563°N 1.59984°W		Early 1840s	The house, at one time a school, is in stone with corner pilasters, a string course, a moulded cornice, and a hipped slate roof. There are two storeys a front of five bays, the middle bay projecting slightly, three bays on the sides and a rear wing on the right. In the centre is a doorway with an architrave, and the windows are sashes with architraves, the window above the doorway with a cornice. In the left return is a bow window, and in the right bay is a porch.
Lodge, gate, gate piers and walls, Cliff House; 53.78521°N 1.59911°W		Early 1840s	The lodge at the entrance to the drive is in gritstone with a moulded eaves cornice and a hipped slate roof. There are two storeys, on the front facing the drive is a two-storey canted bay window, the windows are sashes in moulded architraves, and in the ground floor are carved panels. There are inner and outer gate piers, each with a square section, a chamfered base, a moulded cornice, and a flattened pyramidal capstone. Curved walls link these to outer piers that have vermiculated rustication. The railings and gates are in cast iron.
Former Wortley Wesleyan Methodist Chapel; 53.78641°N 1.59103°W		1846–47	The chapel and the Sunday school at the rear, later used for other purposes, are in stone with slate roofs. The chapel has two storeys, a front of three bays, and four bays along the sides. The front has chamfered quoins, a sill band, and a pedimented gable with a blocked circular window in the tympanum. In the centre is a projecting porch with pilasters and an entablature, and the doorway has a semicircular fanlight. The windows are round-headed with moulded sills on brackets. The Sunday school has coped gables with moulded finials and contains cross windows.
1 Low Moor Side, New Farnley; 53.77610°N 1.62767°W		Mid 19th century	A house at right angles to the road, it is on gritstone, with shaped eaves brackets and a stone slate roof. There are two storeys and three bays. The central doorway has a fanlight, and the windows are sashes in architraves.
Wellholme Cottage; 53.77646°N 1.62899°W	—	19th century	A small house reputed to contain a 16th-century cruck, it is in stone with a plastered gable end, and a stone slate roof. There is one storey and four bays. On the front is a porch, and the windows are casements.
Former Lower Wortley Primary School, railings and gates 53.78366°N 1.59810°W		1876	The school, later a community centre, is in red brick, with stone dressings, and a slate roof with coped gables and carved kneelers. There is one storey at the front and two at the rear, the front has three bays, and the school is two bays deep. On the front, the central gabled bay projects, and contains a three-light mullioned and transomed window, above which is a cusped lancet window flanked by quatrefoils under a hood mould. In the outer bays are entrances with mullioned fanlights and cross windows. At the rear is an arcaded ground floor with buttresses. enclosing the front are railings, and gate piers with gates.
Former Upper Wortley Primary School; 53.79064°N 1.59308°W		1876	The former school is in red brick with stone dressings and a slate roof. It has one and two storeys, and an H-shaped plan, consisting of a central hall range with three bays, and projecting wings with coped gables. The central bay projects slightly and is gabled. The entrances are in the wings, and have pilastered jambs, and carved lintels. The windows are mullioned, with two cusped lights and quatrefoils above.
Church of St Makarios the Great; 53.78544°N 1.62488°W		1885	The church, originally dedicated to St Michael and All Angels, is in gritstone with a slate roof, and is in Gothic Revival style. It consists of a nave with a clerestory, north and south aisles, a south porch, a south transept, and a chancel. The transept is gabled and has a bellcote. The east window has five lights, and at the west end are paired lights.
School in Forster Place; 53.78348°N 1.59880°W		c. 1885	The school is in red brick, with decoration in moulded and cut brick, stone dressings, a moulded eaves cornice, and two coped gables on each front infilled with brick decoration. There are two storeys facing the road and three at the rear, and fronts of four and two bays. The entrance has a pointed arch and a moulded lintel, and the windows are mullioned and transomed, some with segmental hood moulds.
Farnley War Memorial; 53.78351°N 1.62393°W		c. 1920	The war memorial is in an enclosure by the side of the road. It is in Portland stone on a square base, about 3 metres (9.8 ft) high, and consists of a stepped and tapering shaft. On each face is a panel with a coloured sculpture in relief, and below are panels with inscriptions and the names of those lost.
