= Farnley Hall, West Yorkshire =

Elizabethan Manor House in Farnley, West Yorkshire, England

Coordinates: 53.787532°N 1.62308°W

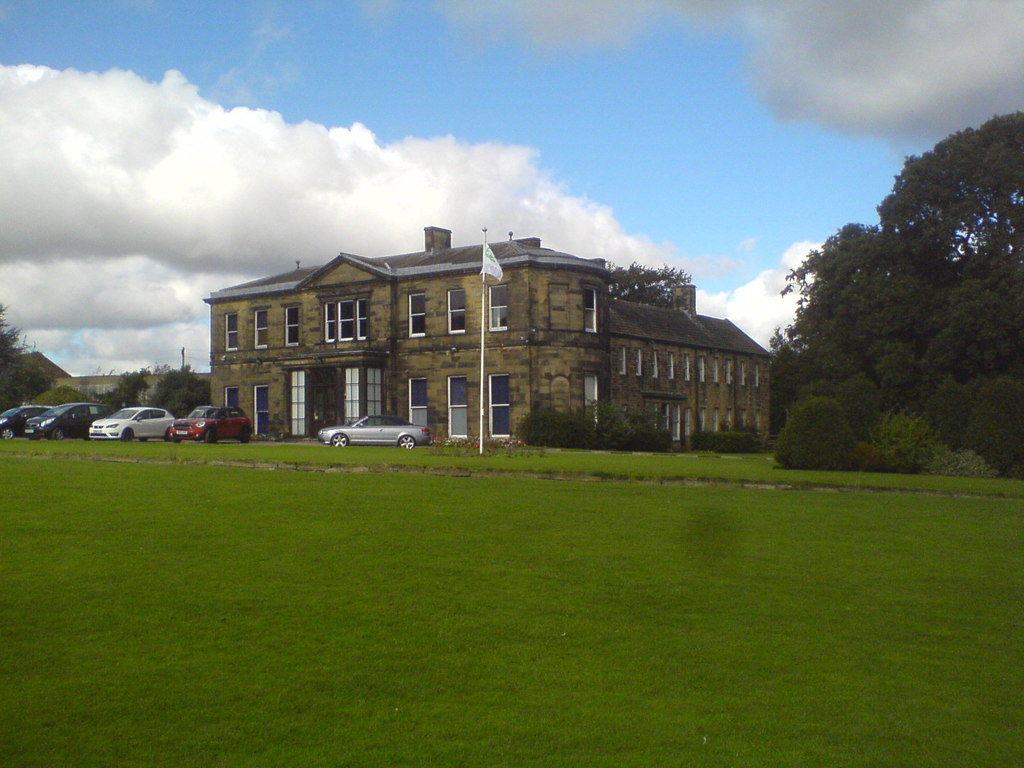
Farnley Hall

Farnley Hall is a stately home in Farnley, west Leeds, West Yorkshire, England. It is a grade II listed building. It was built in Elizabethan times by the Danbys. The manor is recorded in the 1086 Domesday Book as Fernelei, so it is probable that this house was a replacement for earlier medieval structures.

The Danbys owned part of the manor and the hall until 1799, when it was sold to James Armitage. Thomas Danby was first Mayor of Leeds, and Thomas Danby College in Leeds was named after him. The Hall was acquired by the Leeds City Council in 1945 and its grounds were turned into a park. The hall is used as the headquarters of the council's Parks and Countryside Service and is home to Farnley Hall Park.

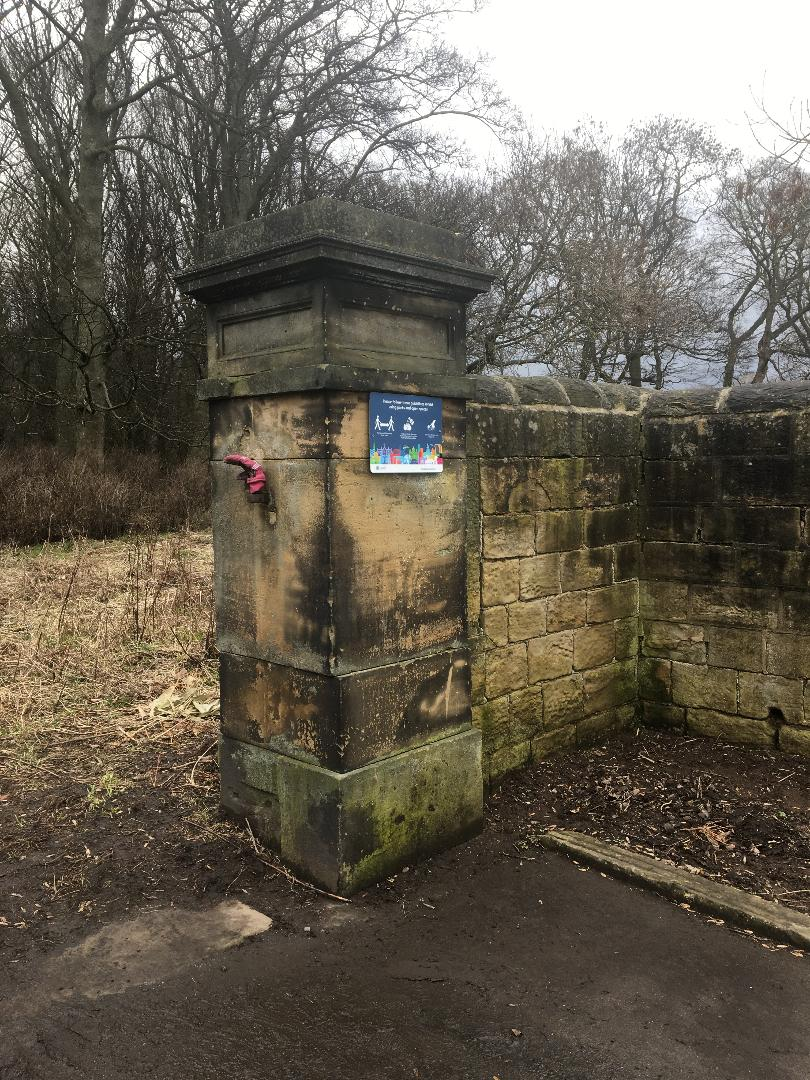
Farnley Hall Gates, stone column gatepost with old gate fixture, right side

Part of the 16th-century house still exists. In the early 19th century a classical front was added. There are gateposts probably dating to the 19th century to the south of the hall at the end of the woodland.

Farnley Parish Church, built in 1885 and dedicated to St Michael, stands across the park from the hall. It replaced an 18th-century building, attributed to John Carr. The classical belfry from this chapel is extant in the churchyard. A chapel is known on this site from 1240. The chapel at Farnley had a historic dedication to St Helen, and a well dedicated to the saint was extant in the village of Farnley until the 1950s when the site was developed for housing by Leeds city council. Remains of medieval tracery used to be preserved in the interior of the church. In October 2011, the church was bought by Saint Makarios The Great Ecclesiastical Trust, who converted it for Romanian Orthodox use.

There is a cottage close by, which is several hundred years old and is linked to the park.

== The Danby family ==
Sir Thomas Danby (1530–1590) built Farnley hall in 1586. Along with the Danby coat of arms, there is a worn inscription on a stone panel at the rear in an archway which reads “Buildid the year of our Lord 1586 and in the reign of the Queen (? Eliz) bi S Thomas Danby Kn.”. He had married Lady Mary Nevill, the daughter of Ralph Neville, 4th Earl of Westmorland and in 1576 became the High Sheriff of Yorkshire. His son Thomas predeceased him so his grandson Christopher Danby inherited his property.

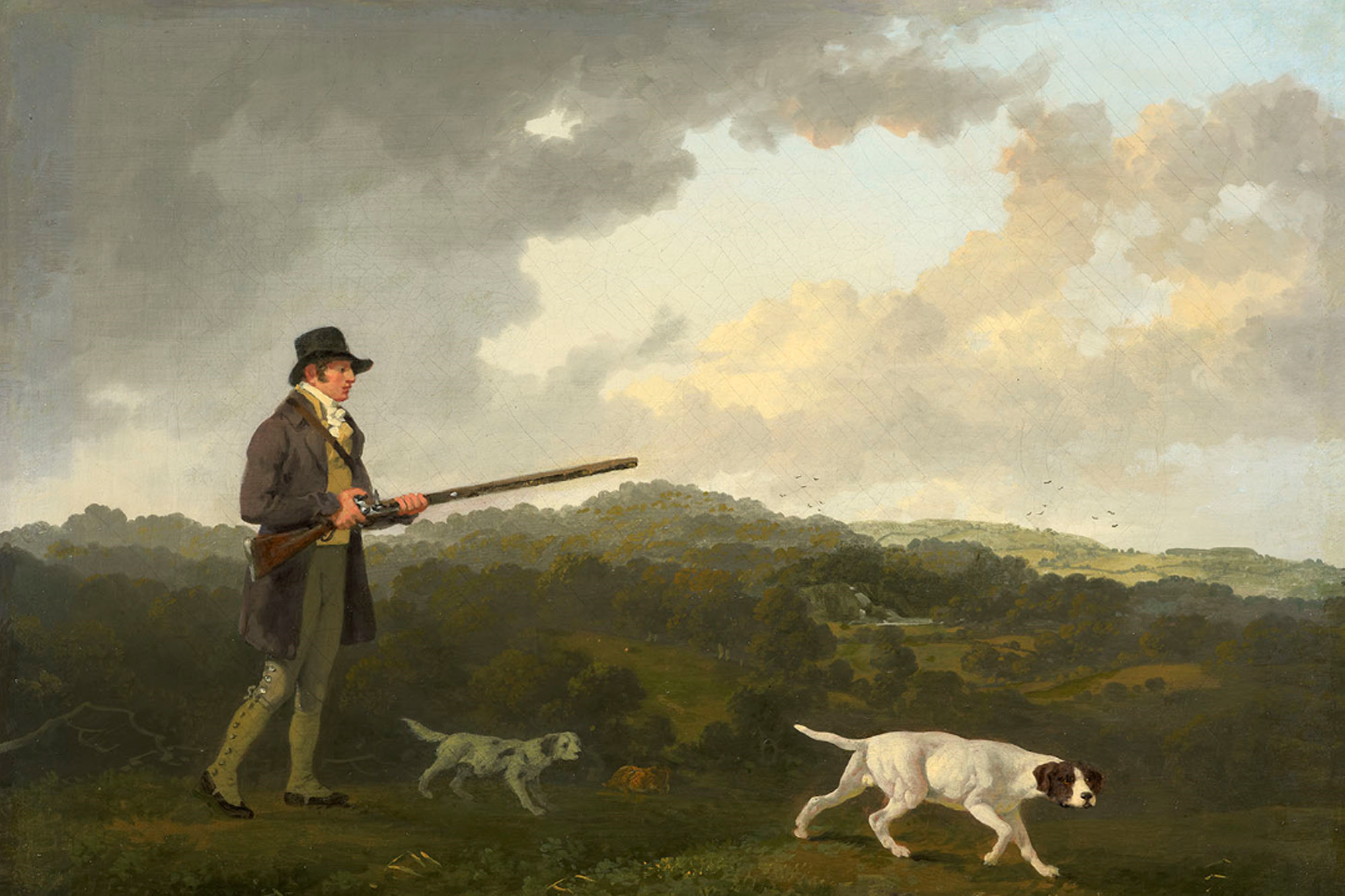
William Danby (1752–1833) who was the last of the Danby family to own Farnley Hall

Christopher Danby (1582–1624) married Francis Parker, daughter of Sir Edward Parker, 12th Baron Morley. When he died in 1624 he was succeeded by his son Sir Thomas Danby (1610–1660) who was a Colonel in the Royal Army and Sheriff of Yorkshire. He married Katherine Wandesford, daughter of Christopher Wandesford, Lord-Deputy of Ireland. When he died in 1660 the Hall passed to his son Thomas Danby (1631–1667) who was the first Mayor of Leeds. His children died young so the property was inherited by his brother Christopher Danby (1636–1689). He married Anne Colepepper, daughter of Colonel Edward Colepepper. His successor was his son Sir Abstrupus Danby.

Sir Abstrupus Danby (1655–1727) was a Member Parliament. He married Judith Moone, daughter of Abraham Moone of Great, St Helen's. Although he possessed numerous manors Sir Abstrupus chose to live at Farnley Hall. The University of Victoria in Canada holds a book written by Sir Anstrupus which is a collection of medical remedies which he considered useful for the benefit of his family. In 1695 he built a house at Swinton Park and this property then was also passed through the succeeding generations of the Danby family.

Sir Abstrupus Danby was succeeded when he died in 1727 by his son Abstrupus Danby (1680–1750) who married twice. His first wife was Eliza Ingram whom he married in 1709 and after she died he married Battina Euston. His son William Danby (1712–1784) by his first wife inherited the house in 1750. He married Margaret Affleck daughter of Gilbert Affleck of Dalham, Suffolk and was succeeded in 1784 by his only son William Danby (1752–1833).

This William Danby lived mainly in the other family house of Swinton Park. He was born in 1752 and in married twice. First to Caroline, daughter of Henry Seymour, and secondly to Anne Holwell, second daughter of William Gater. He was a writer and published several books which are still available. He was the friend and patron of the famous artist Julius Caesar Ibbetson who painted his portrait which is shown. He was the last of the Danby family to own Farnley Hall and in 1799 he sold it to James Armitage.

== The Armitage family ==
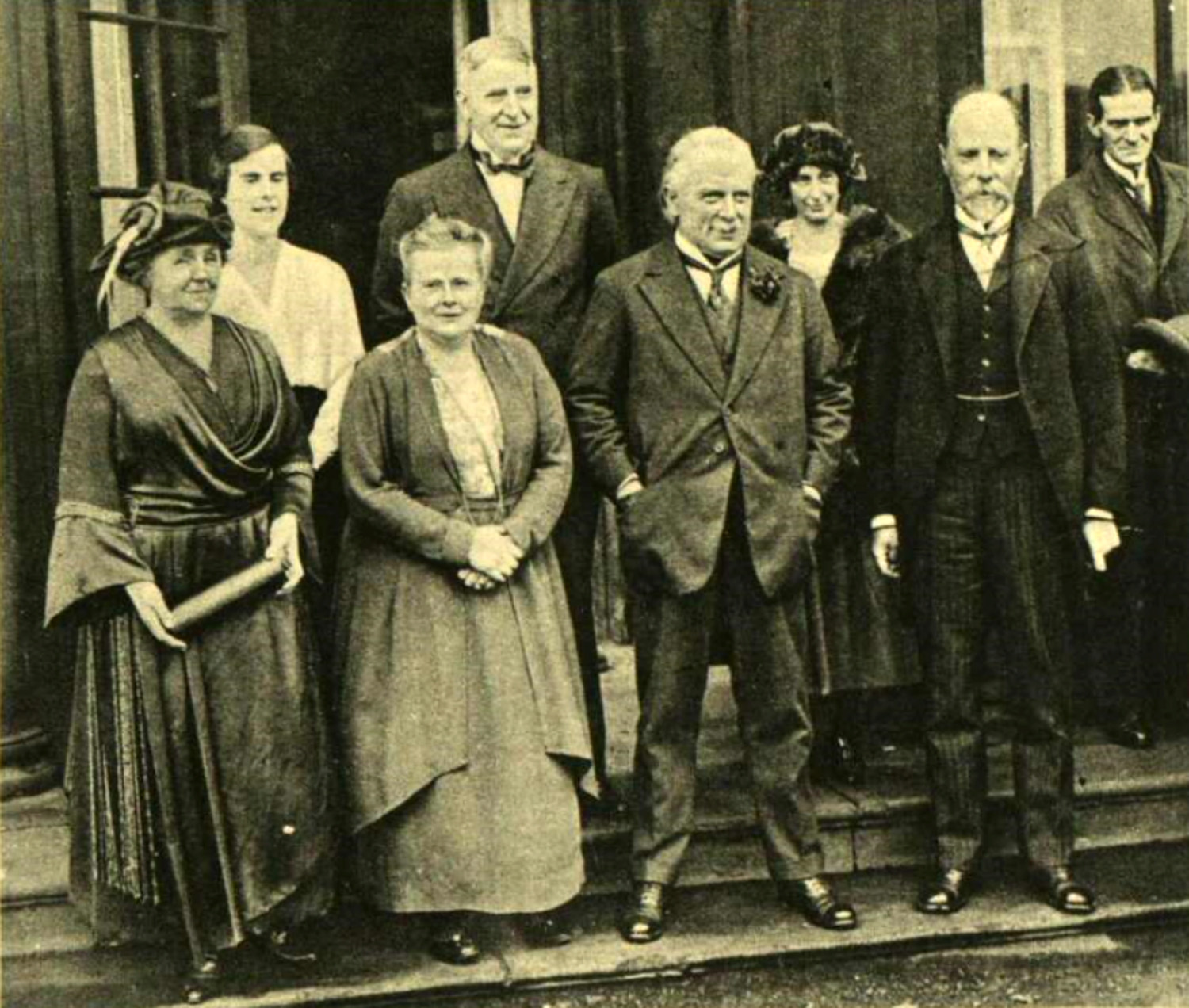
Lloyd George at Farnley Hall, 1922. From left to right Mrs Lloyd George, Miss Evelyn Armitage, Mrs Caroline Armitage (the hostess), Sir Berkeley Moynihan, Mr Lloyd George, Mr Robert Armitage (the host)

.

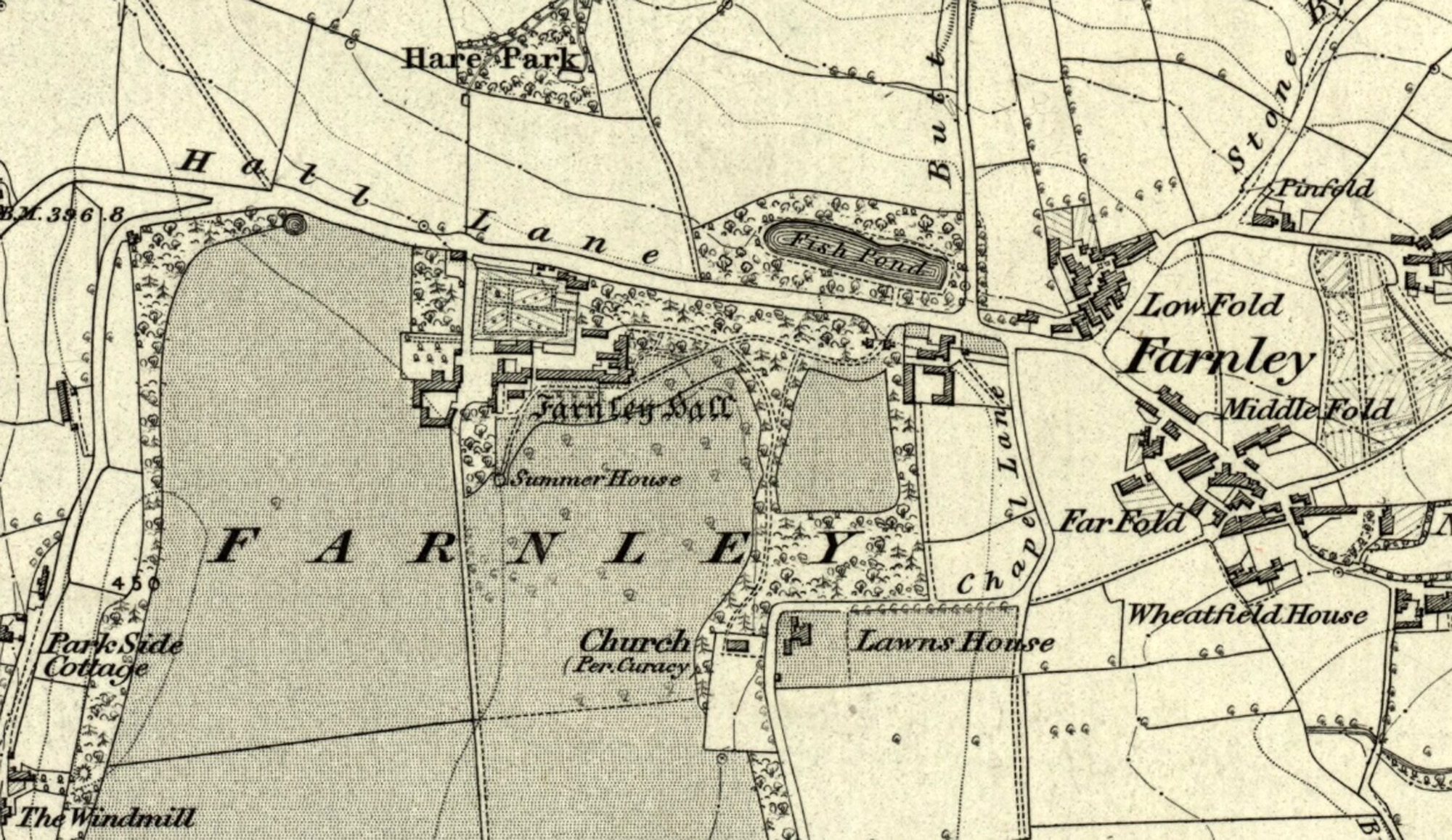
Map of Farnley Hall in 1847

James Armitage (1730–1803) who bought the Hall from the Danby family was a very prosperous wool merchant in Leeds. He was succeeded by his son, Edward Armitage (1764–1829), who in 1806 built a new driveway and refronted the building to include a grand portico supported by Tuscan columns. He also added a new bath house and a large conservatory with adjoining billiard room. Edward was born in 1764 in Leeds and in 1787 he married Sarah Leathley (1768–1847). In his will, he left his estate to his widow, Sarah for life, and gave her power to determine how it should be apportioned between their four surviving sons. Until 1843 she let Farnley Hall to her husband's nephew, John William Rhodes and when she died she established an unusual arrangement by which her four sons were tenants in common of the Farnley estate. The sons were William Armitage (1798–1883), James Armitage (1793–1872), John Leathley Armitage (1792–1870) and Edward Armitage (1796–1878).

The four brothers became partners in the Farnley Iron Works to exploit the coal, iron and fireclay resources found on the estate. The company expanded rapidly and from 1850 the family developed a new village to house their workers at New Farnley.

The next to inherit Farnley Hall was William James Armitage (1819–1895) who was the third son of James Armitage (1793–1872). He entered the family iron business succeeding his uncle and father as chairman and managing director. In 1860 he married Emily Nicholson eldest daughter of William Nicholson of Roundhay Park. The couple had five sons and one daughter. When he died in 1895 his son Robert Armitage inherited the Hall.

Robert Armitage (1866–1944) was educated at Westminster School and Trinity College, University of Cambridge. He was a barrister and later became the Member of Parliament for Central Leeds. In 1905 he was the Lord Mayor of Leeds. He was also involved in the family iron company. He married in 1891 Caroline Katharine Ryder (1867–1933), daughter of Dudley Henry Ryder of Westbrook Hay, Boxmoor. The couple had three sons and four daughters.

He was a personal friend of Lloyd George, the Prime Minister of the United Kingdom and in 1922 George came to visit him for a weekend at Farnley Hall. The event was widely reported in the newspapers. A photo is shown.

When he died in 1944 his son Robert William Armitage inherited Farnley Hall. In the following year it was sold to Leeds City Council who still own it today.

== In television ==
The building was featured in the television series Hadleigh, with it being used for the Melford Park.

== See also ==
- Listed buildings in Leeds (Farnley and Wortley Ward)
