= Thomas Danby (mayor) =

Member of the Parliament of England

Thomas Danby (1631–1667) of Farnley and Thorpe Perrow was the first Mayor of Leeds (1661–62).

He was born in 1631, the son of Sir Thomas Danby (1610–1660) of Farnley Hall (West Yorkshire), and his wife Katherine Wandesford, and married Margaret Eure in 1659.

In 1660 he became Member of Parliament for Malton, and in 1661 (via a charter for the city of Leeds from King Charles II) he became the first Mayor of Leeds. The mayoral duties were actually carried out by his deputy Edward Atkinson, but Danby's symbols were added to the Leeds coat of arms.

He died on 31 July 1667 in a sword fight in a London tavern.

Thomas Danby College was named after him.
