= Thomas Armitage (clergyman) =

American clergyman

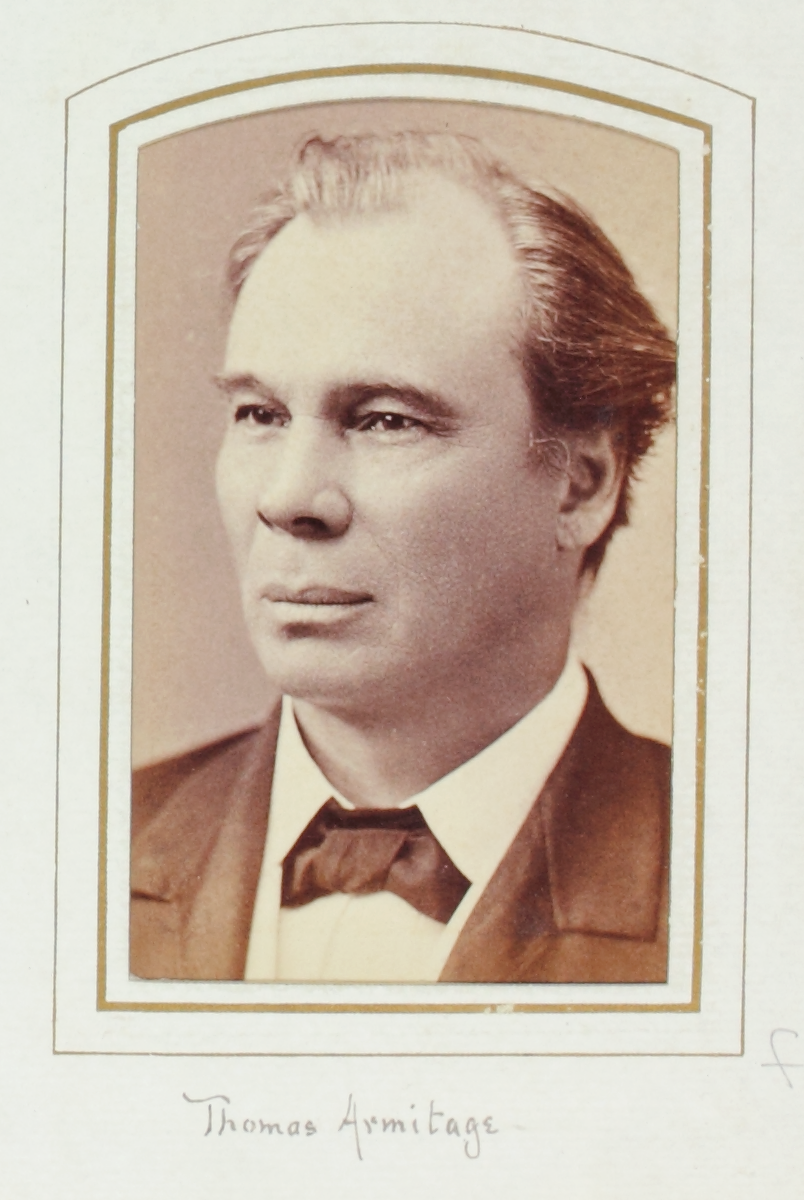
- Born: August 2, 1819; Pontefract
- Died: January 20, 1896 (aged 76); Yonkers
- Occupation: Writer

Thomas Armitage (August 2, 1819 – January 20, 1896) was an American Baptist clergyman.

Thomas Armitage was born on August 2, 1819 in Pontefract, England. Coming to New York in 1838, he entered the ministry of the Methodist Episcopal church. In 1848 he embraced the doctrine of the Baptist church, and as a pastor in New York attained prominence as one of the leading writers and pulpit orators of that denomination. He interested himself in the movement for Bible revision, especially in regard to what he believed to be the correct translation of the Greek word for baptism, and was one of the founders in 1850 of the American Bible Union, of which society he afterward became president. After 1848 he was the pastor of the Fifth Avenue Baptist Church in New York City. He published Lectures on Preaching, its Ideal and Inner Life (Philadelphia, 1880), and A History of the Baptists (New York, 1886). Thomas Armitage died on January 20, 1896 in Yonkers.

- Johnson, Rossiter, ed. (1906). "Armitage, Thomas". The Biographical Dictionary of America. Vol. 1. Boston: American Biographical Society. p. 136.
