= Flora Anne Armitage =

American novelist

Flora Anne Armitage (21 October 1911, in Yorkshire, England – 6 February 1995, in Webster, Texas) was an English-born American biographer and novelist. She was a Guggenheim Fellow for the academic year 1957–1958.

With her family, Flora Armitage immigrated in 1927 to the United States from England. The family settled in Texas. She became a U.S. citizen in April 1937 in Houston. In 1945 she moved to New York City to work for British Information Services (a branch of British government propaganda effort), which employed her until her retirement.

Armitage is mainly known for her 1955 biography of T. E. Lawrence. The biography was translated into three languages. Her published work includes three novels, short fiction, and essays. When she died she was working on a biography of W. H. Hudson. At the time of her death, her unpublished work included "at least four other novels, a series of short stories, and some poetry".

== Selected publications ==
- Sebastian. Garden City: Doubleday & Co. 1946.
- The Desert and the Stars: a Portrait of T. E. Lawrence. New York: Holt, Rinehart and Winston. 1955.
- The Five Deceivers. New York: Dodd, Mead. 1963.
- The Transformation of Mrs Arthur. New York: Dodd, Mead. 1966.
