= Harry Armitage =

English footballer

Personal information
- Date of birth: 16 August 1901
- Place of birth: Sheffield, England
- Date of death: 2 September 1973 (aged 72)
- Place of death: Crewe, England
- Height: 5 ft 6 1/2 in (1.69 m)
- Position: Full back

Senior career*
Years	Team	Apps	(Gls)
1919–1920	Hathersage		
1920–1922	Sheffield Wednesday	3	(0)
1922–1926	Bristol Rovers	122	(0)
1926–1927	Lincoln City	9	(0)
1927–????	Scarborough Town		
- * Club domestic league appearances and goals

Harold A. 'Harry' Armitage (1901–1973) was a footballer who played professionally for Sheffield Wednesday, Bristol Rovers and Lincoln City.

Armitage started out playing for Hathersage, with whom he won the Sheffield Amateur League during the 1919–20 season, before joining Sheffield Wednesday in 1920. In two seasons with Wednesday he made just three League appearances, and he moved on to Bristol Rovers in May 1922.

Armitage was a regular in the Bristol Rovers defence during his four years at the club, playing in 122 League games during that period, and also playing cricket for Stapleton C.C. during the summer of 1923. In 1926 he joined Lincoln City for a year, before moving to Scarborough Town in 1927.

== Sources ==
- Jay, Mike; Byrne, Stephen (1994). Pirates in Profile: A Who's Who of Bristol Rovers Players. Bristol: Potten, Baber & Murray. p. 7. ISBN 0-9524835-0-5.
- Byrne, Stephen; Jay, Mike (2003). Bristol Rovers Football Club - The Definitive History 1883-2003. Stroud: Tempus. p. 494. ISBN 0-7524-2717-2.
