= Jack Armitage =

English footballer (born 1897)

Personal information
- Full name: John Henry Armitage
- Date of birth: 21 August 1897
- Place of birth: Chapeltown, England
- Height: 5 ft 10 in (1.78 m)
- Position: Defender

Senior career*
Years	Team	Apps	(Gls)
1924–1926	Burnley	44	(1)
1926–1929	Oldham Athletic	90	(3)
1929–1930	Southend United	9	(3)
1930–1931	Northampton Town	4	(0)
- * Club domestic league appearances and goals

John Henry Armitage (born 21 August 1897, date of death unknown) was an English professional footballer who played as a centre-half.

Armitage started his professional career with Burnley, who he joined in May 1924. He made his league debut for the Clarets on 4 October 1924 in the 0–1 defeat to West Bromwich Albion at Turf Moor. He went on to make 27 league appearances in his first season with the club. He continued to play regularly during the following campaign and scored his first senior goal on 1 January 1926 in the 3–1 away victory over Newcastle United. However, the win proved to be Armitage's penultimate appearance for Burnley as he played his last game for the club the following day in the 2–3 defeat to Aston Villa.

In May 1926, Armitage joined Oldham Athletic and played 90 league games for the club in three seasons before moving to Southend United at the end of the 1928–29 campaign. He spent one season with Southend, scoring three goals in nine appearances. He ended his career with Northampton Town and retired from football in 1931.
