= Abstrupus Danby =

English wool merchant and country gentleman (1655-1727)

Sir Abstrupus Danby
- Born: 1655
- Died: 1727 (aged 71–72)
- Occupation: Merchant

Sir Abstrupus Danby (27 December 1655 – 27 December 1727) was an English wool merchant and country gentleman. He was the son of Christopher Danby and Anne Culpepper, niece of Lord Colepeper.

== Career ==
He was knighted at Kensington in 1691, and was also a justice of the peace and deputy lieutenant for Yorkshire.

== Later life and death ==
In 1695, upon the death of his father, he built himself a new house at Swinton Park and sold off the family's old house of Scruton Hall. Upon his death in 1727, his properties were inherited by his son, also named Abstrupus Danby.

Parliament of England
Preceded by Christopher Tancred; William Wentworth	Member of Parliament for Aldborough; 1698–1701; With: Sir George Cooke, Bt	Succeeded by Robert Monckton; Cyril Arthington
