= Ken Armitage =

English footballer

Personal information
- Full name: Kenneth James Armitage
- Date of birth: 23 October 1920
- Place of birth: Sheffield, England
- Date of death: 1952 (aged 31–32)
- Place of death: Sheffield, England
- Position: Centre half

Senior career*
Years	Team	Apps	(Gls)
- Barnsley
–1946	Gainsborough Trinity		
1946–1947	Leyton Orient	7	(0)
1947–1948	Oldham Athletic	5	(0)
1948	Ashton United		
- * Club domestic league appearances and goals

Kenneth James Armitage (23 October 1920 – 1952), also known as Ken Fenton, was an English professional footballer who played in the Football League for Leyton Orient and Oldham Athletic as a centre half.
