= Catharine Armitage =

Caroline Catharine Armitage (10 January 1944 – 16 January 2020) was a British painter. She was the wife of Paul Feiler.
