= St John Armitage =

A rare picture of St John Armitage during his tenure as counsellor at the British consulate, Dubai, attending the opening of Sharjah English School in 1975. Armitage is second from right. Also pictured are the school's founder David Eldon and Sheikh Dr Sultan Al Qasimi.

Henry St John Basil Armitage (5 May 1924 – 19 October 2004) was a British army officer, diplomat and prominent Arabist, who served in the Arab Legion and the Omani Army before joining the diplomatic corps.

In a career across the Middle East spanning 60 years, Armitage was intimately involved with the Arab world, particularly in Saudi Arabia and the United Arab Emirates. He was awarded the OBE in 1968 and CBE in 1978.

== Early career ==
Armitage was born in Bradford, Yorkshire on 5 May 1924. He was educated at St Bede's and Bradford Grammar Schools, and Christ's Hospital, Lincoln. In 1942 he went on to read oriental studies at Trinity College, Cambridge but after a year was called up to serve in the Army.

Sent to the Middle East, he served in Transjordan under John Bagot Glubb in the Arab Legion. Deciding to remain in the army following the war, Armitage was seconded to the British Military Mission to King Abdul Aziz Ibn Saud, advising the Saudi Defence Minister, where he was responsible for sending a first generation of officer cadets from Saudi Arabia to train at Sandhurst. He was credited with helping to manage the often fractious relationship between Britain and Saudi Arabia in the years leading up to the Buraimi dispute, when British interests in the Trucial States and Oman were frequently at odds with Saudi intentions at a time when British influence in Saudi Arabia, particularly in the area of defence, was under pressure from American oil and defence companies.

Armitage left the British army with the rank of Major in 1949, and spent two years working in desert locust control in both Kenya and Yemen - an area of work that his close friend Wilfrid Thesiger had previously pursued. Following this, he joined Sultan Said bin Taimur of Oman's Defence Force in the remote town of Salalah in the rebellious southern Omani province of Dhofar. During his time in Oman, Armitage was to form a strong relationship with Qaboos bin Said, Said bin Taimur's only son who would later go on to become ruler of Oman. After seven years in the Omani army, Armitage took up consultancy work, first in the oil industry in Libya and then, in 1962, in Beirut.

== Diplomatic service ==
Following his time in Beirut, Armitage joined the British diplomatic service as first secretary, commercial in Baghdad. He was responsible for the evacuation of the British community in Baghdad when the Iraqi government broke off relations with the UK in 1967 over supposed British complicity with Israel in the Six-day war, acting as a scout for their caravan to safety in Iraq, an action which saw him awarded the OBE.

He served in Beirut for a short time before travelling once again to Saudi Arabia, where he was to serve for six years, including as Chargé d'Affaires. From this posting, he took up his final diplomatic role as counsellor at the British consulate in Dubai, United Arab Emirates While there, he was to note that 'the Gulf is no longer a British pearling ground.' He was credited with creating a large share in the United Arab Emirate's blossoming economy for British companies in the years following UAE independence.

Former British diplomat Alan Munro's obituary of Armitage in The Independent notes, "He did not always see eye to eye with the bureaucrats in the Board of Trade" and this is borne out by the archives, which show Armitage urging a modernisation of outdated approaches to commerce and trade relations with the newly emerging and oil-rich nations of the Gulf - castigating the Board of Trade's 'outdated' approach. "As I see it the day of the Trade Missions as conceived at present has passed - the Arabs' call for industrialisation was the death knoll of an ailing exercise. There is no longer any need for trade and industry to use the present concept of the mission vehicle; in general travel, communications, accommodation and the markets thenselves have reached an acceptable standard of "Westernisation" for even the smallest little Englander. Firms who have business here should be out here doing it, not wasting time waiting for the next bus," he flung at the Commercial Relations & Exports Division of the Department of Trade in November 1974. He went on, "Sacred cows can be afforded in a land of plenty, in straitened circumstances they are, at best, a luxury. I do not advocate killing off as the best solution, but I do not know why they should not be used to work and for nourishment."

As former Political Agent to the Trucial States (and lifelong friend) James Craig noted of Armitage, "...he could at times be undiplomatically forthright. Nor did he easily tolerate those who fell short of his own standards. But despite the occasional asperity he was a deeply kind man, generous, honourable, endearing."

Following his retirement to Somerset, Armitage remained active in promoting Anglo-Arab relations, trade and better understanding, including membership of the Council for the Advancement of Arab-British Understanding, the British-Yemeni Society, the Royal Society for Asian Affairs, the Anglo-Omani Society, and the Sultan of Oman's Armed Forces Association. He served as honorary secretary of the British/Saudi Arabian Parliamentary Group.

== Personal life ==
While serving in Dhofar, in 1956, Armitage married Jennifer Bruford. They had two children, a son and daughter. He was awarded the CBE on his retirement from the Foreign Office in 1978 and, on his 80th birthday, was awarded the Saudi Order of King Abdulaziz, an award rarely granted to non-Saudis. An amateur scholar and expert on the lives of Middle Eastern Arabists including TE Lawrence and St John Philby, Armitage was a staunch defender of Lawrence's reputation and was one of the organisers of the T E Lawrence Centenary Exhibition at the National Portrait Gallery in 1988.

He was also a contributor to both books about Saudi Arabia and the RUSI Journal. A collection of his lecture papers is held in the UK National Archives and also at the Middle East Centre Archive, St Antony's College, University of Oxford.

Henry St John Basil Armitage died on 19 October 2004.
