= Edward Armitage (cricketer) =

Irish cricketer and British Army officer

Personal information
- Full name: Edward Leathley Armitage
- Born: 26 April 1891; Omagh, Ireland
- Died: 24 November 1957 (aged 66); St Leonards-on-Sea, Sussex, England
- Batting: Right-handed
- Bowling: Right-arm medium pace

Domestic team information
- Years: Team
- 1919–1925: Hampshire
- 1929–1931: Marylebone Cricket Club
- 1929/03: Europeans

Career statistics
Competition	First-class
Matches	20
Runs scored	576
Batting average	17.45
100s/50s	1/1
Top score	105
Balls bowled	958
Wickets	26
Bowling average	18.30
5 wickets in innings	1
10 wickets in match	–
Best bowling	5/67
Catches/stumpings	11/–
- Source: Cricinfo, 15 December 2007

Edward Leathley Armitage OBE (26 April 1891 – 24 November 1957) was an Irish first-class cricketer and an officer in the British Army. In a military career which spanned from 1910 to 1944, Armitage served in both the First and Second World Wars, in addition to other regional conflicts in British India. His military career ended with him holding the honorary rank of brigadier. As a first-class cricketer, he mostly played county cricket for Hampshire and services cricket for the British Army cricket team, recording one century.

== Early life and military career ==
The son of John Leathley Armitage (1857–1938) and his wife Annie, he was born at Omagh in April 1891. He was educated in England at Cheltenham College, before attending the Royal Military Academy at Woolwich. He graduated from there as a second lieutenant into the Royal Garrison Artillery in December 1910. He was promoted to lieutenant in December 1913, before serving in the First World War, in which he was promoted to captain in August 1916. Shortly after the end of the war, he was appointed an adjutant in May 1919, a post he relinquished in January 1920. Armitage was appointed to the Royal Military Academy in September 1922, where he was placed in command of a company of gentlemen cadets, which was an appointment he held until April 1926.

Armitage served with the Royal Artillery in British India and British Burma from 1927 to 1935. During this period, he saw action in the North West Frontier Province during the Afridi Redshirt Rebellion and in the subsequent Mohmand campaign. In Burma, he took part in actions in the largely non-administered Wa States. He was promoted to major in January 1929, and was made an OBE in the 1935 Birthday Honours. In September 1937, he was appointed to the Territorial Army to command the Pembroke Yeomanry, firstly as a temporary lieutenant colonel, before being granted the rank in full in November of the same year. In June 1939, he was transferred to the reformed 38th (Welsh) Infantry Division and the following month was promoted to colonel. Armitage served in the Second World War, later retiring during the war in September 1944, at which point he was granted the honorary rank of brigadier. Following the war, he was mentioned in dispatches for his service during the Mediterranean campaign. He was appointed to the Order of Saint John in the 1946 New Year Honours.

== First-class cricket ==
Following the First World War, he played first-class cricket for Hampshire, making his debut against Essex at Bournemouth in the 1919 County Championship. He played first-class cricket for Hampshire intermittently until 1921, making seven appearances; he would later make a further first-class appearance for Hampshire in the 1925 County Championship against Worcestershire. Beginning in 1921, Armitage began playing first-class cricket for the British Army cricket team, with him making seven appearances until 1929. During two return visits to England, he played for the Free Foresters against Cambridge University in 1929, in addition to playing for the Marylebone Cricket Club (MCC) against Oxford University in the same year, and Cambridge University in 1931; against Oxford, he recorded his only century, with a score of 105 in the MCC first innings.

While serving in India, he made two first-class appearances. The first came for the Europeans cricket team against the Parsees at Bombay in the 1929–30 Bombay Quadrangular Tournament. His second match came for a Viceroy's XI against the Roshanara Club at Delhi in 1933. Overall in first-class cricket, he scored 576 runs at an average of 17.45. With his right-arm medium pace bowling, he took 26 wickets at a bowling average of 18.30; 19 of these came for the British Army, which included figures of 5 for 67. Armitage also played minor matches for Malaya against Hong Kong and for the Straits Settlements against the Federated Malay States.

== Personal life and death ==
On 28 April 1945 in London he married Lady Katherine Jane Elizabeth Manley, née Carnegie, daughter of the 10th Earl of Northesk, as her second husband. Armitage died at St Leonards-on-Sea in November 1957. He was the first cousin twice removed of Edward Armitage and Thomas Rhodes Armitage, second cousin once removed of the politician Robert Armitage, and third cousin of Robert Selby Armitage.
