= Richard Armitage =

Richard Armitage may refer to:

- Richard Armitage (actor) (born 1971), English actor
- Richard Armitage (agent) (1928–1986), English talent agent
- Richard Armitage (government official) (1945–2025), American politician and naval officer
