= David Armitage =

David Armitage may refer to:

- David Armitage (historian) (born 1965), British historian
- David Armitage (footballer) (born 1988), Australian footballer
- David Armitage Bannerman (1886–1979), British ornithologist
