= Goody Armitage =

First woman to be licensed as an innkeeper in America

Goody Armitage (fl. 1643), was the first woman to be licensed as an innkeeper in America.

There is next to no information available about Goody Armitage except that she was living in Massachusetts Bay in 1643 and that when she petitioned for a license she was approved to serve meals but 'not to draw wine' making her the first woman to be licensed as an innkeeper in colonial America. Her establishment is also listed as the first restaurant.
