= Michael Armitage =

Michael Armitage may refer to:

- Michael Armitage (artist) (born 1984), Kenyan painter
- Michael Armitage (politician) (born 1949), Australian former politician
- Michael Armitage (RAF officer) (1930–2022), British Royal Air Force commander
