= Armitage (disambiguation) =

Armitage is a village in Staffordshire, England.

Armitage may also refer to:

== Places ==
- Cape Armitage on Ross Island, Antarctica
- Armitage, a community that is now part of Newmarket, Ontario, Canada
- Armitage River, a tributary of Chibougamau Lake in Quebec, Canada
- Armitage (Schriever, Louisiana)
- Armitage Avenue (Chicago), an east–west arterial street in Chicago, Illinois, United States
  - Armitage (CTA), a train station in Chicago serving Armitage Avenue
- Armitage with Handsacre, a civil parish in Staffordshire, England

== Other uses ==
- Armitage III, an anime film series
- Armitage, an eponymous comic series featuring Detective-Judge Armitage
- Armitage (surname), includes a list of people and characters
- Armitage (comics), a science fiction series in the British comic anthology the Judge Dredd Megazine
- Armitage (computing), a graphical cyber attack management tool for the Metasploit Project
- Armitage Manufacturing Company, a historic factory in Richmond, Virginia
- Armitage Robinson, a priest in the Church of England and scholar
- Armitage Hux, a First Order general in the Star Wars universe
- Armitage Trail, pen name of Maurice R. Coons, an American pulp fiction author

== See also ==
- Armitage–Doll multistage model of carcinogenesis
- Armitage Shanks, manufacturers of bathroom furniture, which started there
- Armytage (surname)
