= Farnley, Leeds =

District of Leeds, West Yorkshire, England

Coordinates: 53.7876°N 1.6159°W

Farnley
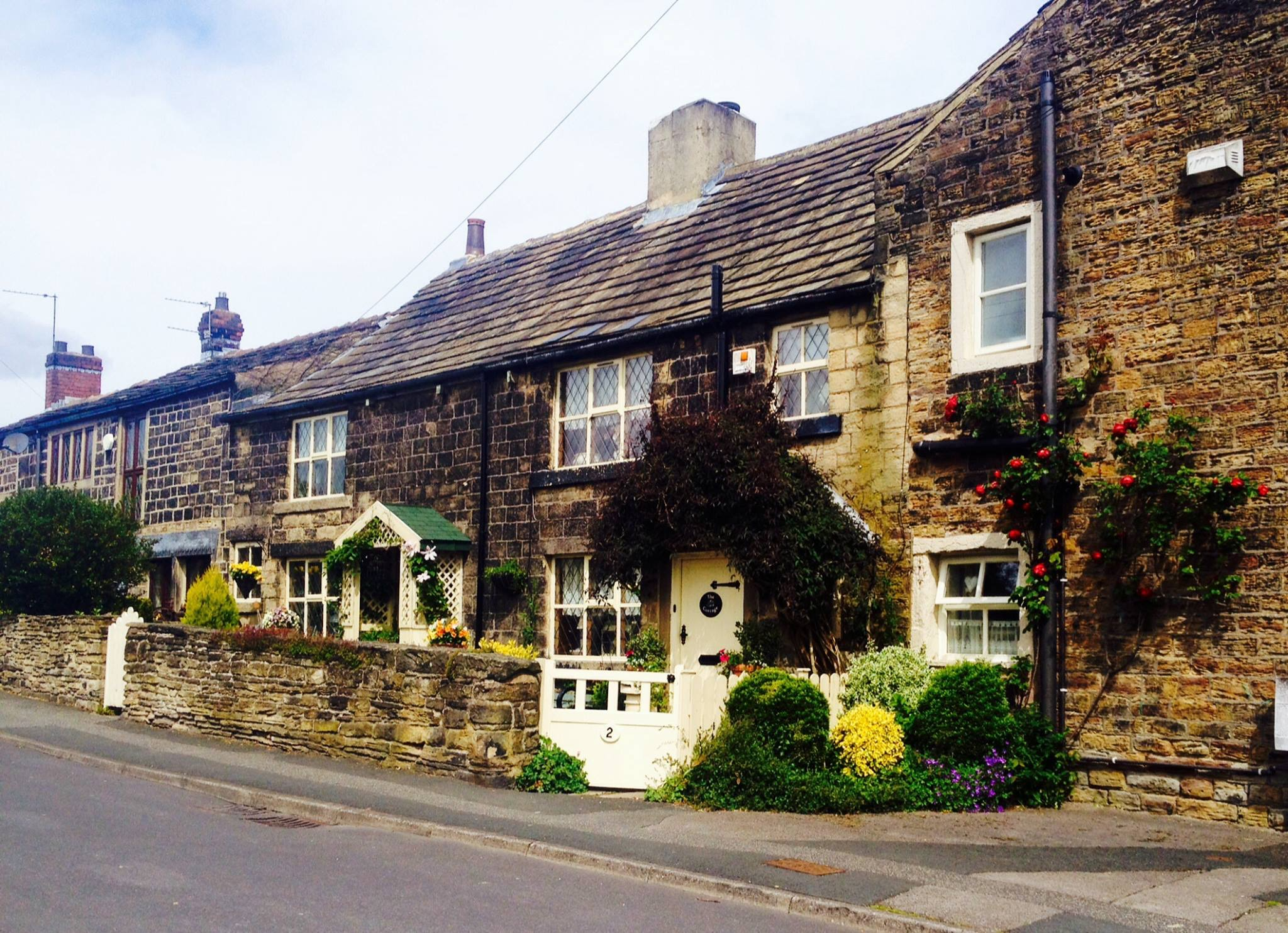
- New Farnley Village

- Location within West Yorkshire
- Population: 24,213 (Farnley and Wortley ward, 2011)
- Metropolitan borough: City of Leeds
- Metropolitan county: West Yorkshire
- Region: Yorkshire and the Humber
- Country: England
- Sovereign state: United Kingdom
- Post town: LEEDS
- Postcode district: LS12
- Dialling code: 0113
- Police: West Yorkshire
- Fire: West Yorkshire
- Ambulance: Yorkshire
- UK Parliament: Leeds South West and Morley

Farnley is a district in Leeds, West Yorkshire, England, 2 miles (3.2 km) west of Leeds city centre, between Wortley, Bramley and the countryside around Pudsey and Gildersome, in the LS12 Leeds postcode area. It is part of the Leeds City Ward Farnley and Wortley with a population of 24,213 according to the 2011 Census. New Farnley is a nearby commuter village.

== Etymology ==
The name of Farnley was first attested in the 1086 Domesday Book as Fernelei. The name comes from the Old English words fearn ('fern') and lēah ('open land in woodland'), and thus meant 'clearing characterised by ferns'.

== Farnley ==
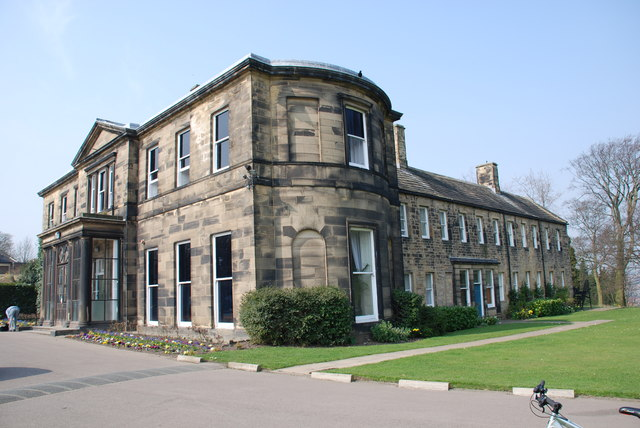
Farnley Hall.

Farnley village (also known as Old Farnley) started as a small agricultural village dating back to early medieval times. When first recorded in the Domesday Book, it was in the Hundred of Morley and was part of the King’s land, with Ilbert de Lacy being the tenant-in-chief. The original Farnley village started around Cross Lane which serviced Farnley Hall (on Hall Lane) and the Farnley Manor House (at the junction of Hall Lane to Chapel Lane). The Manor and Estates of Farnley were held in 1086 by Swain Fitz Alric and then a number of his descendants until it passed by marriage to Sir James Danby in 1497. The Danbys held it for about 300 years before it was bought by James Armitage. Farnley was surrounded by the villages of Bawn, Upper Moor Side and Low Moor Side. Farnley was heavily wooded until the 19th century, and Farnley Wood was the meeting point for a would-be rebellion against Charles II in 1663 which was known as the Farnley Wood Plot (believed to have taken place in Sykes wood, at the bottom of Green Lane). Although the rebellion failed from lack of support, the betrayal led to 26 participants being condemned to death, with 16 hanged, drawn and quartered in York.

Farnley was formerly a chapelry in the parish of Leeds, in 1866 Farnley became a separate civil parish, on 26 March 1904 the parish was abolished to form Armley and Bramley. In 1901 the parish had a population of 4351.

The people of Farnley worked in the mills surrounding the area including the Butterbowl Mill and the three mills situated in the area around Post Hill (including Union Bridge Mill and the Woolen Mills of Farnley and Upper Mill).

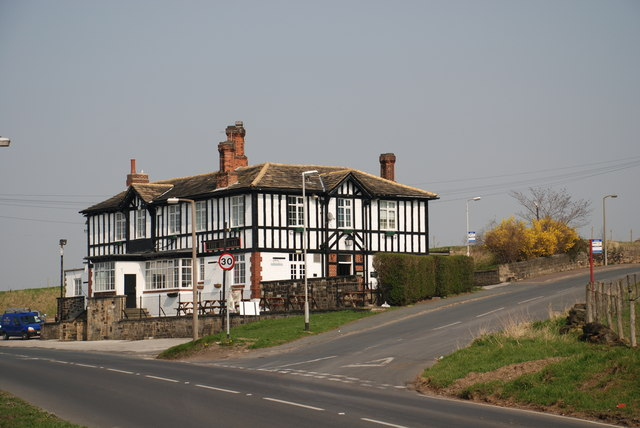
Beulah Pub, early 19th century coaching Inn.

New Farnley did not exist as a village until the early part of the 19th century when Edward Armitage started the Farnley Iron Works and Farnley Fireclay. He needed many workers so built houses for them, so what had been known as part of Farnley now became New Farnley. With the increasing urban expansion connected with the industrial revolution of the 19th century, Low Moor Side emerged into New Farnley and the Bawn into Farnley. The close proximity of these two settlements led to the whole area being referred to as New Farnley, while the area around Hall Lane and Cross Lane (the original Farnley Village) was popularly called Old Farnley.

At the lower area of Old Farnley sits St Wilfrid's Church. St Michael's church is in Farnley park near the stately home of Farnley Hall.

Shops in the original village of Farnley now include a hair salon, a newsagent, and a mini-mart. Farnley has a lower set of shops (in what was originally Bawn village) consisting of a pizza takeaway, a newsagent, a mini-mart, a butcher and Cow Close Community Corner. The area of Farnley is served by several schools, in particular Cobden Primary School, Lawns Park Primary School and The Farnley Academy.

Old Farnley is the western terminus for First Leeds Bus Routes 15 and 42. It is likely that past bus operators in Leeds coined the name Old Farnley to avoid confusion with Farsley, another nearby area of Leeds.

In 1904, Farnley Civil Parish was abolished to create the Armley and Bramley Civil Parish. The Farnley civil parish had included slightly more than the area between the ring road, Wood Lane, Back Lane, Tong Road and Park Spring; in particular it included New Farnley. The population of the civil parish was 4,351 in 1901 and 4,208 in 1911.

== New Farnley ==
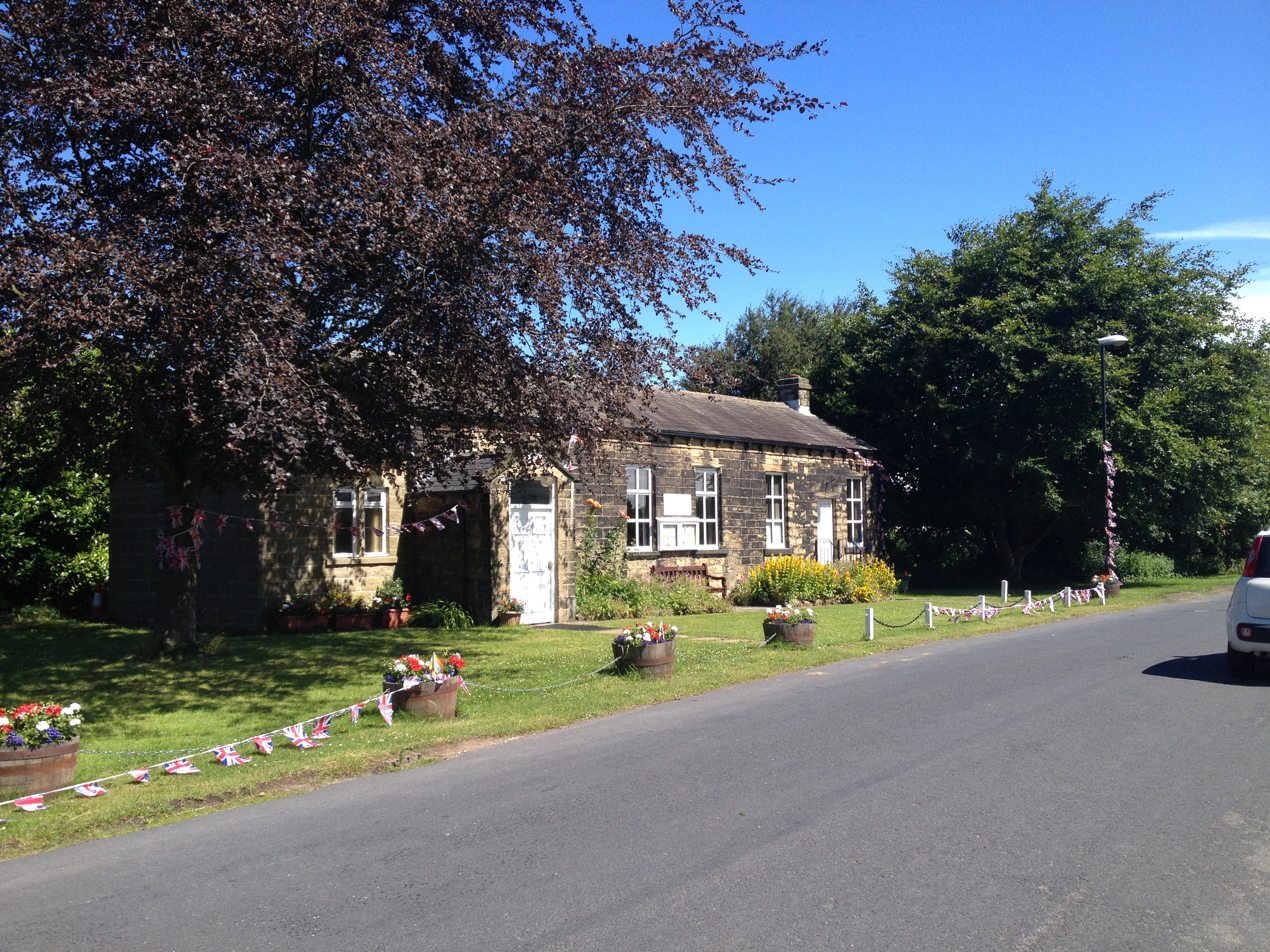
Lancasterian School Room Upper Moorside, founded 1813.

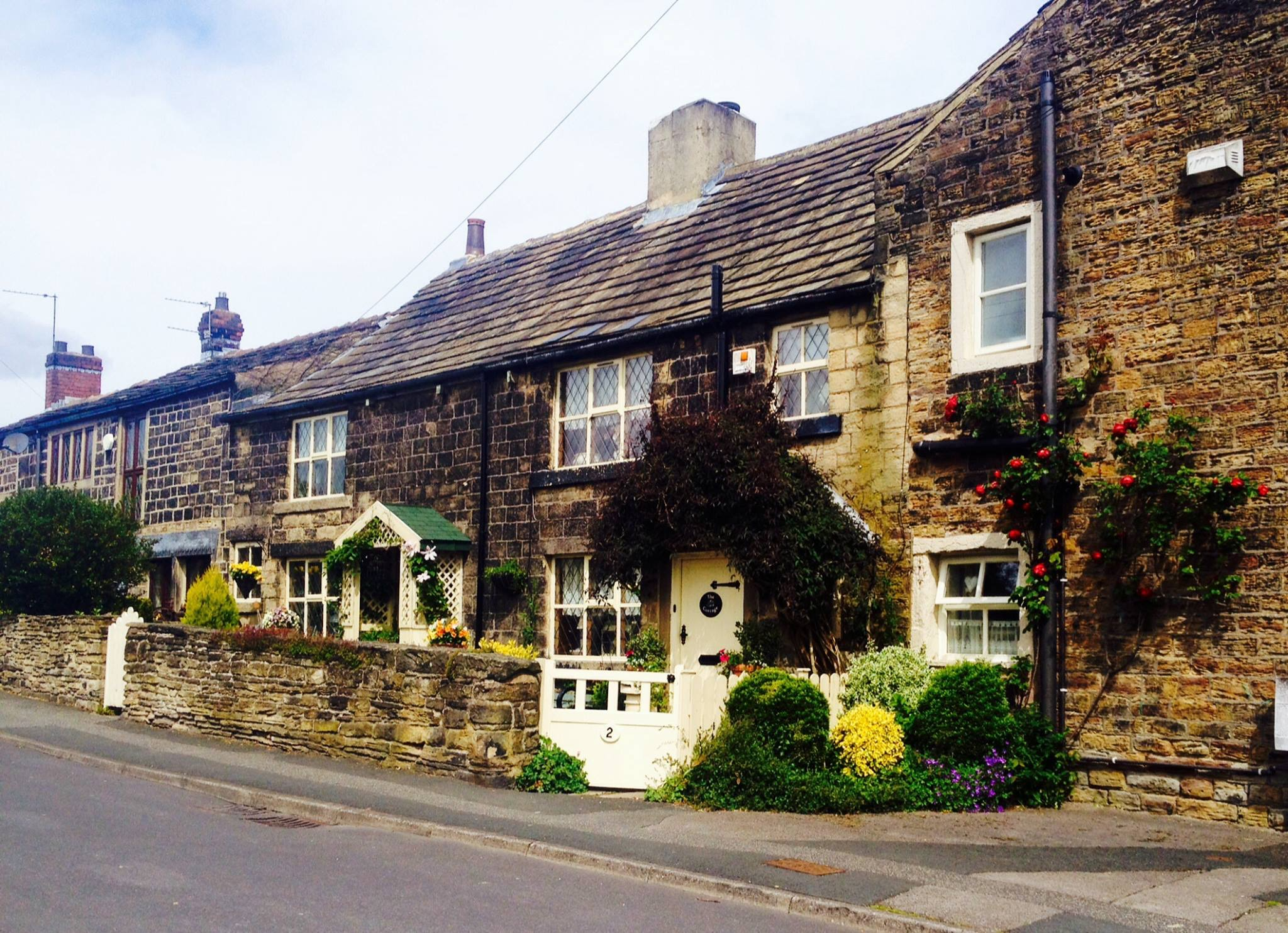
New Farnley 18th century cottages

New Farnley is a commuter village in Leeds, West Yorkshire, England, 3 1/2 miles (5.6 km) west of Leeds city centre, on the A58 Leeds-Halifax main road. New Farnley lies about 1 mile (1.6 km) south west of Farnley and was part of the Farnley Civil Parish.

It grew around two historic settlements, Upper Moor Side and the modern centre of New Farnley Village, both of which had nucleated settlements recognisable in early estate maps. There are still buildings dating from the late 17th and early 18th-century standing in both locations. It was part of the ancient manor of Farnley, ownership of which was split and held by families including the Harringtons, Nevilles, Brudenells, Danbys and finally, the Armitages.

The discovery of a 3rd-century coin may point to Roman activity in the area. A field of Harper Farm has the name 'Castle Hill', leading to a local tradition (which appears to have originated with an estate manager of Farnley Hall) that it was the site of a Roman marching camp. The field name first appears in early modern estate maps. There are also Saxon field names in the village and remains of medieval ridge and furrow. Other evidence of medieval activity may be the place-name Snittels Farm, a possible corruption of "spital", indicating the location of a medieval (leper?) hospital. However, there is no archaeological or documentary evidence to support this.

There was industrial development of the significant natural resources in the area from the early modern period (if not earlier). This industry led to the rapid expansion of settlement with the construction of workers housing in the 19th century. Despite this industrial activity a number of farms are still working in the area.

As the population increased, St James's church and the Lancasterian School were built, both of which originally served as chapels of ease. There was also a Methodist chapel. Alms houses were built in the 19th century along with a village school. Local amenities included a recreation ground. There were a number of shops including The Village Chippy and Cooperative with grocers, butchers and drapers.

New Farnley now has a village co-op which includes a post office, Craven's Fish and Chip shop which is over 120 years old and said to be haunted, also a pub, a barber shop, a beauty salon, Cobden Primary and Lawns Park Primary Schools, The Farnley Academy, and two churches. The centrally located community centre is owned by the residents of the community and run on a voluntary basis. It is a hub for the activities of the village, is home to a local Mums and Tots group, and hosts several community nights over the year, e.g. at Halloween or Christmas.

== Sport ==
Farnley is represented in Rugby league via the Farnley Falcons amateur club. The Falcons currently play in Pennine League Division 5, and also run a reserve side, playing in Pennine League Division 7. They also compete in the Yorkshire Cup and various regional cup competitions. They're based at the Farnley Sports & Social Club (locally known as 'The Nest'), and play their home games on the pitches close by. Other sports played out of Farnley Sports and Social are Farnley Sports Fc who play on Saturdays - they are league 2 division champions and were promoted from division 1 to championship which they won undefeated & now play in the premiership . They play in the Yorkshire Amateur League, they are also have a reserve side. West Leeds Wortley also play from here as a Sunday football team. Also based at Farnley Cricket Club are, 'Wortley Ladies Women's Football Teams', a First Team and a Reserve Team, the Reserves were 3rd Division Champions 2012/13, and the First Team were 1st Division Champions 2013/14 to be the first Ladies Team from Wortley/West Leeds area to be promoted to the Premier.

New Farnley has its own Ladies team, currently playing their home games on the Chapel Lane ground, next to Lawns Park Primary, they are currently in the third division of the West Riding Women's League.

== Notable people ==
Farnley is well regarded in Leeds for its sports and that shows in the list of notable individuals which includes footballer, who currently plays for Manchester City, Kalvin Phillips and rugby league player, who currently plays for Catalan Dragons, Michael McIlorum.

As well as there being famous people from Farnley there have been several notable people who have lived in Farnley such as former Leeds United and Republic of Ireland national football team player Gary Kelly or comedian and actor Leigh Francis.

Medieval landowner Margaret de Neville was born in Farnley.

== See also ==
- Listed buildings in Leeds (Farnley and Wortley Ward)
