= Robert Armitage (Royal Navy officer) =

Robert Selby Armitage
- Born: 28 March 1905; Birling, Kent
- Died: 26 May 1982 (aged 77); Nettlebed, Oxfordshire
- Military career
- Allegiance: United Kingdom
- Branch: Royal Naval Volunteer Reserve
- Service years: 1939–1945
- Rank: Lieutenant Commander
- Unit: HMS Vernon
- Conflicts: Second World War
- Awards: George Cross; George Medal
- Other work: Stockbroker

Robert Selby Armitage, GC, GM (28 March 1905 – 26 May 1982), sometimes known as Robert Selby, won both the George Cross and George Medal for his bomb disposal work during the Second World War, one of only eight people to have been awarded both.

== Early life ==
The son of the Rev. Philip Armitage (1870–1960) and his wife Elizabeth Christina Armitage, née Marshall (c1875-1934), he was born in Birling in Kent on 28 March 1905 and educated at Rugby School and Trinity College, Cambridge. On 28 September 1938 he married Frances Bland Tucker.

== Second World War ==
He defused unexploded bombs during the blitz in 1940, notably a mine that fell on Orpington in Kent. The mine had come to rest in a tree and he climbed a ladder to defuse it, offering no chance of escape if the fuse had been triggered. His George Cross was gazetted in the London Gazette on 27 December 1940, and he was invested on 24 May 1941 at the medal's first investiture ceremony. He was one of four recipients: one civilian and one each from the Navy, Army and Air Force.

Also in 1940, he commanded a small coaster at the evacuation of the British Army from Dunkirk.

His George Medal, gazetted on 15 February 1944, was for mine disposal work at Corton Sands, Suffolk on 15 June 1942 while serving in HMS Vernon.

== Later life and family ==
On 26 May 1982, at his home in Nettlebed, Oxfordshire, he shot his wife, wounding her slightly, and then killed himself.

Armitage was a nephew of Robert Armitage, great nephew of Edward Armitage and Thomas Rhodes Armitage, and third cousin of Edward Leathley Armitage.
