= Armytage =

Armytage is a surname. Notable people with the surname include:

- Jack Armytage (1872–1943), Canadian ice hockey player
- James Charles Armytage (1802 or ca. 1820–1897), English engraver
- Sir John Armytage (1732–1758), 2nd Baronet and British politician
- Sir George Armytage (politician) (1734–1783), 3rd Baronet and British politician
- George Armytage (grazier) (1795–1862) grazier in Australia
- Marcus Armytage, jockey
- Paul Green-Armytage (1881–1971), English cricketer
- Samantha Armytage (born 1977), Australian journalist and television news presenter
- Bertram Armytage (1869–1910), Australian soldier and explorer

== See also ==
- Armytage baronets, baronetcies created for members of the Armytage family
- Green Armytage forceps, medical instruments
- Mount Armytage in Antarctica
- Armitage (disambiguation)
