= Robert Armitage (politician) =

British politician

- Armitage in 1922

Member of Parliament for Leeds Central
- In office 1906–1922
- Preceded by: Gerald William Balfour
- Succeeded by: Arthur Wellesley Willey

Personal details
- Born: February 22, 1866
- Died: February 10, 1944 (aged 77)
- Education: Trinity College, Cambridge

Robert Armitage (22 February 1866 – 10 February 1944) was Member of Parliament for Leeds Central, England, from 1906 to 1922 and Lord Mayor of Leeds in 1904–05.

== Background ==
Armitage was a son of William James Armitage and Emily Nicholson of Farnley, Leeds. He was the nephew of Edward Armitage and Thomas Rhodes Armitage, the uncle of Robert Selby Armitage, and second cousin once removed of Edward Leathley Armitage. He was educated at Westminster School and Trinity College, Cambridge. He earned a Bachelor of Arts in 1888. He first married in 1891, Caroline Katharine Ryder, a daughter of Dudley Henry Ryder of Westbrook-Hay, Hemel-Hempstead. They had three sons and four daughters. She died in 1933. He then married in 1936, Mrs Mary Dorothea Russell, widow of Rev. E. Bacheler Russell.

== Career ==
Armitage was called to the bar by the Inner Temple in 1889. He was director of several mining companies including Brodsworth Main Colliery Company, Llay Main Colllieries, Markham Main Colliery and Wagon Finance Corporation.

== Politics ==
Armitage c1906

Armitage served as Lord Mayor of Leeds from 1904–05 and Deputy Lord Mayor from 1905–06, 1906–07 and 1908–09. He was a Justice of the peace for the City of Leeds. He gained Leeds Central from the Conservative in 1906, the first time the Liberals had won the constituency. He was comfortably re-elected in both 1910 elections. He supported the wartime Coalition government. At the 1918 election he received endorsement by the government and did not get a Unionist opponent and was easily re-elected. At the 1922 election he stood as a candidate of the official Liberal party rather than as a National Liberal supporter of Lloyd George. As a result he not only faced a Labour party opponent but a Unionist opponent and lost his seat, finishing third. He did not stand for parliament again.

=== Electoral record ===
General election 1906 : Leeds Central
Party	Candidate	Votes	%	±%
Liberal	Robert Armitage	4,188	57.3	+15.0
Conservative	Gerald Balfour	3,119	42.7	−15.0
Majority		1,069	14.6	n/a
Turnout		7,307	82.2	+9.0
Registered electors		8,893		
Liberal gain from Conservative		Swing	+15.0	

General election January 1910 : Leeds Central
Party	Candidate	Votes	%	±%
Liberal	Robert Armitage	3,987	54.2	
Conservative	John Gordon	3,366	45.8	
Majority		621	8.4	
Turnout			87.9	
Liberal hold		Swing		

General election December 1910 : Leeds Central
Party	Candidate	Votes	%	±%
Liberal	Robert Armitage	3,519	52.6	−2.6
Conservative	John Gordon	3,169	47.4	+2.6
Majority		350	5.2	−5.2
Turnout			79.9	−8.0
Liberal hold		Swing	-2.6	

General election 1918 Leeds Central
Party		Candidate	Votes	%	±%
C	Liberal	Robert Armitage	11,474	70.6	+18.0
	Independent	Ernest Terry	2,634	16.2	n/a
	Co-operative Party	Joseph Smith	2,146	13.2	n/a
Majority			8,840	54.4	+49.2
Turnout			16,254	37.4	−42.5
Registered electors			43,496		
	Liberal hold		Swing	n/a	
C indicates candidate endorsed by the coalition government.

General election 1922 : Leeds Central
Party	Candidate	Votes	%	±%
Unionist	Arthur Willey	14,137	50.0	n/a
Labour	Henry Slesser	7,844	27.8	+14.6
Liberal	Robert Armitage	6,260	22.2	−58.4
Majority		6,293	22.2	n/a
Turnout		28,241	66.1	+28.7
Registered electors		42,738		
Unionist gain from Liberal		Swing	n/a	

Parliament of the United Kingdom
Preceded by Gerald William Balfour	Member of Parliament for Leeds Central; 1906–1922	Succeeded by Arthur Wellesley Willey
