= List of United Kingdom MPs: W =

Following is an incomplete list of past and present Members of Parliament (MPs) of the United Kingdom whose surnames begin with W. The dates in parentheses are the periods for which they were MPs.

WA

- Thomas Waite (1646–1648)
- John Wakeham (1974–1992)
- Robin Walker
- Joan Walley (1987–2015)
- Samuel Waterhouse
- Tom Watson
- George Ward
- John Ward (1906–1929)
- William Ward (1826–1831)
- George Wardle (1906–1920)

WE

- Mike Weatherley (2010–2015)
- Sidney Webb, 1st Baron Passfield (1922–1929)
- Paul Wentworth
- Andrew Western

WH

- James Wharton
- John Wheatley (1922–1930)
- Heather Wheeler
- Chris White
- Eilidh Whiteford
- Alan Whitehead
- William Whiteley (1922–1931), (1935–1955)

WI

- Malcolm Wicks (1992–2012)
- James Wignall (1918–1925)
- Ellen Wilkinson (1924–1931), (1935–1947)
- David Willetts
- Arthur Willey (1922–1923)
- Roger Williams
- Stephen Williams
- Gavin Williamson
- Jenny Willott (2005–2015)
- Wilfrid Wills (1931–1935)
- David Wilshire (1987–2010)
- Arnold Wilson (1933–1940)
- Sir Charles Wilson (1923–1929)
- Harold Wilson (1945–1983)
- Richard Fountayne Wilson
- Sammy Wilson
- Joseph Havelock Wilson (1892–1900), (1906–1910), (1918–1922)
- Thomas Wing (1910)
- Rowland Winn, 2nd Baron St Oswald
- Henry Winterbotham
- Sir Nicholas Winterton (1971–2010)
- Dame Rosie Winterton (1997–present)
- Margaret Wintringham

WO

- Sir Walter Womersley, 1st Baronet (1924–1945)
- Charles Wood, 1st Viscount Halifax
- Leanne Wood
- Sir Matthew Wood, 1st Baronet
- William Wood
- Phil Woolas (1997–2010)
- Ken Woolmer (1979-1983)
- Sidney Woolf

WR

- David Wright

WY

- Woodrow Wyatt (1945–1955), (1959–1970)
