= Fabian Hamilton =

British politician (born 1955)

Fabian Hamilton MP
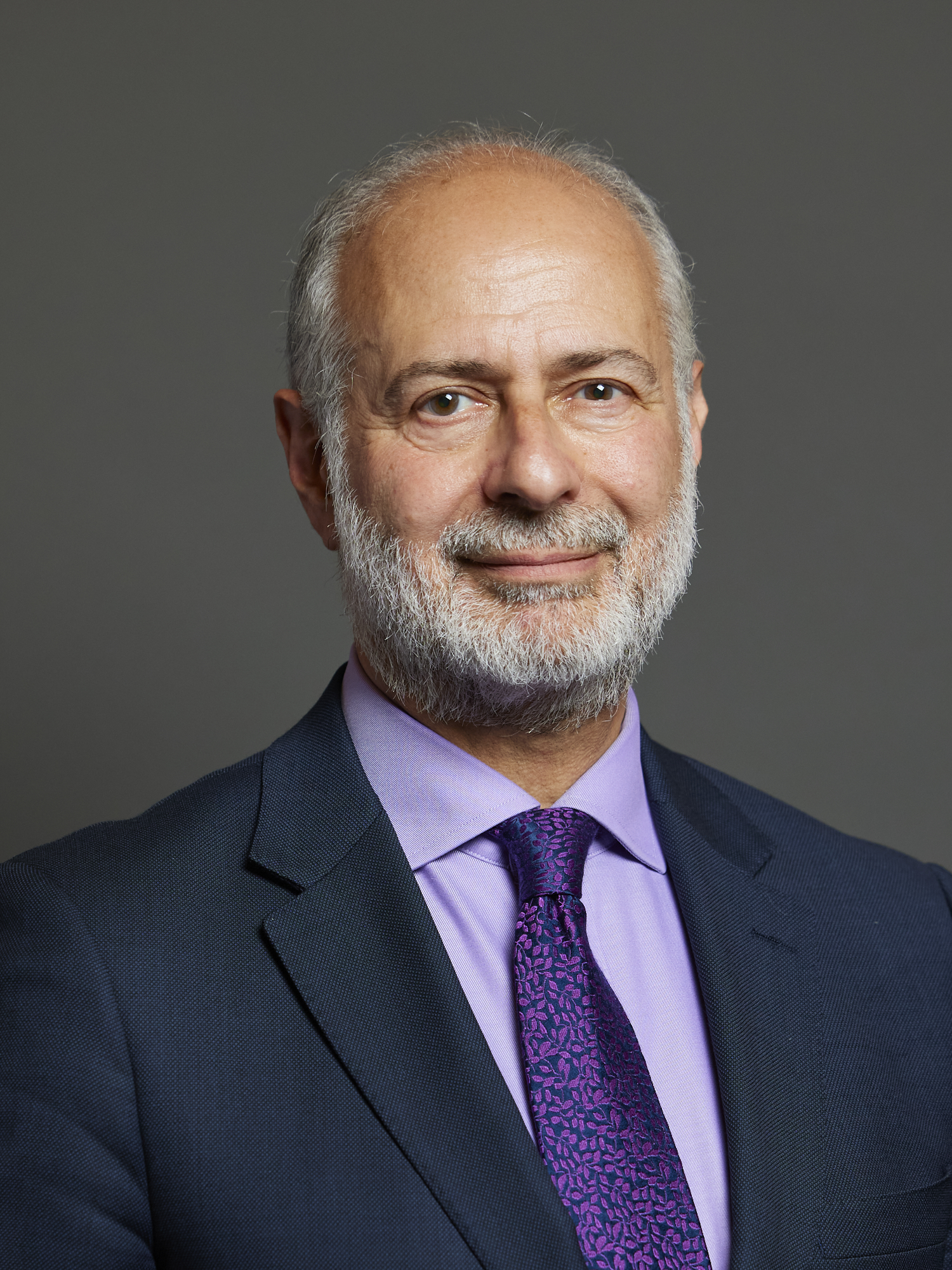
- Official portrait, 2024

Shadow Minister for Peace and Disarmament
- In office 8 November 2016 – 5 September 2023
- Leader: Jeremy Corbyn; Keir Starmer
- Preceded by: Office established
- Succeeded by: Office abolished

Shadow Minister for the Middle East
- In office 30 June 2017 – 9 April 2020
- Leader: Jeremy Corbyn
- Preceded by: Catherine West
- Succeeded by: Wayne David

Shadow Minister for Africa
- In office 20 January 2016 – 29 June 2016
- Leader: Jeremy Corbyn

Shadow Minister for Europe
- In office 29 June 2016 – 4 July 2016
- Leader: Jeremy Corbyn
- Preceded by: Pat Glass
- Succeeded by: Khalid Mahmood

Member of Parliament for Leeds North East
- Incumbent
- Assumed office 1 May 1997
- Preceded by: Timothy Kirkhope
- Majority: 16,083 (35.6%)

Leeds City Councillor for Wortley Ward
- In office 1987–1998
- Preceded by: Pat Fathers
- Succeeded by: David Blackburn

Personal details
- Born: Fabian Uziell-Hamilton; 12 April 1955 (age 71) London, England
- Party: Labour
- Spouse: Rosemary Ratcliffe
- Children: 3
- Education: University of York
- Website: Official website

Fabian Uziell-Hamilton (born 12 April 1955) is a British Labour Party politician who has been the Member of Parliament (MP) for Leeds North East since 1997. He served as Shadow Minister for Peace and Disarmament from November 2016 to September 2023.

== Early life and career ==
Fabian Uziell-Hamilton was born on 12 April 1955 in London to a British Jewish family. His grandfather was a rabbi. His father Mario, a solicitor, and his mother Adrianne, a judge, were members of the Liberal Party, for which his father was several times an election candidate.

He was educated at Brentwood School in Essex where he participated in the school's dramatic productions, playing a minor role in the Shakespeare play Julius Caesar alongside Douglas Adams and Griff Rhys Jones. He then attended the University of York where he was awarded a Bachelor of Arts degree.

From 1978, he worked as a taxi driver for a year before working as a graphic designer. From 1994 until his election to parliament in 1997, he was a computer systems consultant with Apple Macintosh Computer Systems.

He was elected as a councillor to the City of Leeds Council in 1987, stepping down in 1998. He was elected as the chairman of the Leeds West Constituency Labour Party in 1987.

== Parliamentary career ==
Hamilton stood as the Labour candidate in Leeds North East at the 1992 general election, coming second with 36.8% of the vote behind the incumbent Conservative MP Timothy Kirkhope.

Despite having achieved the highest Labour swing in the North of England, the constituency Labour Party voted, by a margin of one vote, in favour of an all-women shortlist. Hamilton was quoted by The Independent as saying:

For six years, I was chair of Leeds city council's equal opportunities committee. Equal ops was my life. And to find that, as far as the Labour Party is concerned, equal opportunity now means positive discrimination, came as a real shock to me. I am told that my generation of men will just have to stand back and make way for women. And I understand why certain women in the Party have pushed that policy. But I think they're wrong. What they don't seem to take on board is that I've only got one life, too. I didn't choose my time on earth any more than I chose my sex or my race. And I really mean it when I say that being kept out of a job just because I'm a man offends me as deeply as being kept out of a job just because I'm a Jew.

Leeds North-East made its selection on 1 July 1995, selecting Liz Davies, a barrister and councillor in the London Borough of Islington. Davies defeated four local women, two of whom were Leeds city councillors. Her selection was vetoed by the National Executive Committee, allegedly for her left-wing politics; unhappy with the situation, opponents took out an unsuccessful private prosecution against Hamilton under the Companies Act in connection with his printing business. Hamilton won the subsequent selection process.

At the 1997 general election, Hamilton was elected to Parliament as MP for Leeds North East with 49.2% of the vote and a majority of 6,959. He made his maiden speech on 23 June 1997, in which he explained that his constituency stretches from the inner-city Leeds district of Chapeltown all the way out to Harewood House, the stately home of the Earls of Harewood.

In Parliament he served as a member of the Administration Select committee 1997–2001, and has been a member of the Foreign Affairs Select Committee.

Hamilton was re-elected as MP for Leeds North East at the 2001 general election with a decreased vote share of 49.1% and an increased majority of 7,089. He was again re-elected at the 2005 general election, with a decreased vote share of 44.9% and a decreased majority of 5,262.

In November 2006, Hamilton was a signatory of the Euston Manifesto and of the statement of principles of the Henry Jackson Society a neoconservative foreign policy think tank.

In October 2008, Hamilton was the first MP to hold a virtual surgery for constituents who can go to his constituency office while he is in London, and converse via webcam.

In 2009, MP Fabian Hamilton faced accusations from The Daily Telegraph of improperly claiming £3,000 for mortgage expenses on an equity release plan, which is not allowed. The newspaper also alleged he "flipped" the designation of his second home to furnish and decorate two properties. Hamilton responded by stating the expense claim was a "genuine mistake," which he repaid upon discovery by the House of Commons Fees Office, and accused the newspaper of "deliberately misrepresenting" him.

Hamilton was again re-elected at the 2010 general election with a decreased vote share of 42.7% and a decreased majority of 4,545.

He was a signatory of an open letter to the then-Labour Party leader Ed Miliband in January 2015 calling on the party to commit to oppose further austerity, take rail franchises back into public ownership and strengthen collective bargaining arrangements.

He supports Labour Friends of Israel and in April 2015 was critical of Ed Miliband's stance on the Israel-Gaza conflict.

Hamilton was again re-elected at the 2015 general election, with an increased vote share of 47.9% and an increased majority of 7,250.

On 7 January 2016, Hamilton was appointed a shadow Foreign Minister, outside the Shadow Cabinet. On 29 June 2016, Hamilton was appointed as Shadow Europe Minister to replace Pat Glass, who resigned over concerns about Corbyn's leadership. Hamilton resigned a few days later on 4 July 2016, saying that he was troubled by Corbyn's response to the Chakrabarti Inquiry into anti-Semitism.

At the snap 2017 general election, Hamilton was again re-elected with an increased vote share of 63.1% and an increased majority of 16,991. He was re-elected as MP for Leeds North East at the 2019 general election with a decreased vote share of 57.5% and an increased majority of 17,089. Hamilton was again re-elected at the 2024 general election, with a decreased vote share of 51.5% and a decreased majority of 16,083.

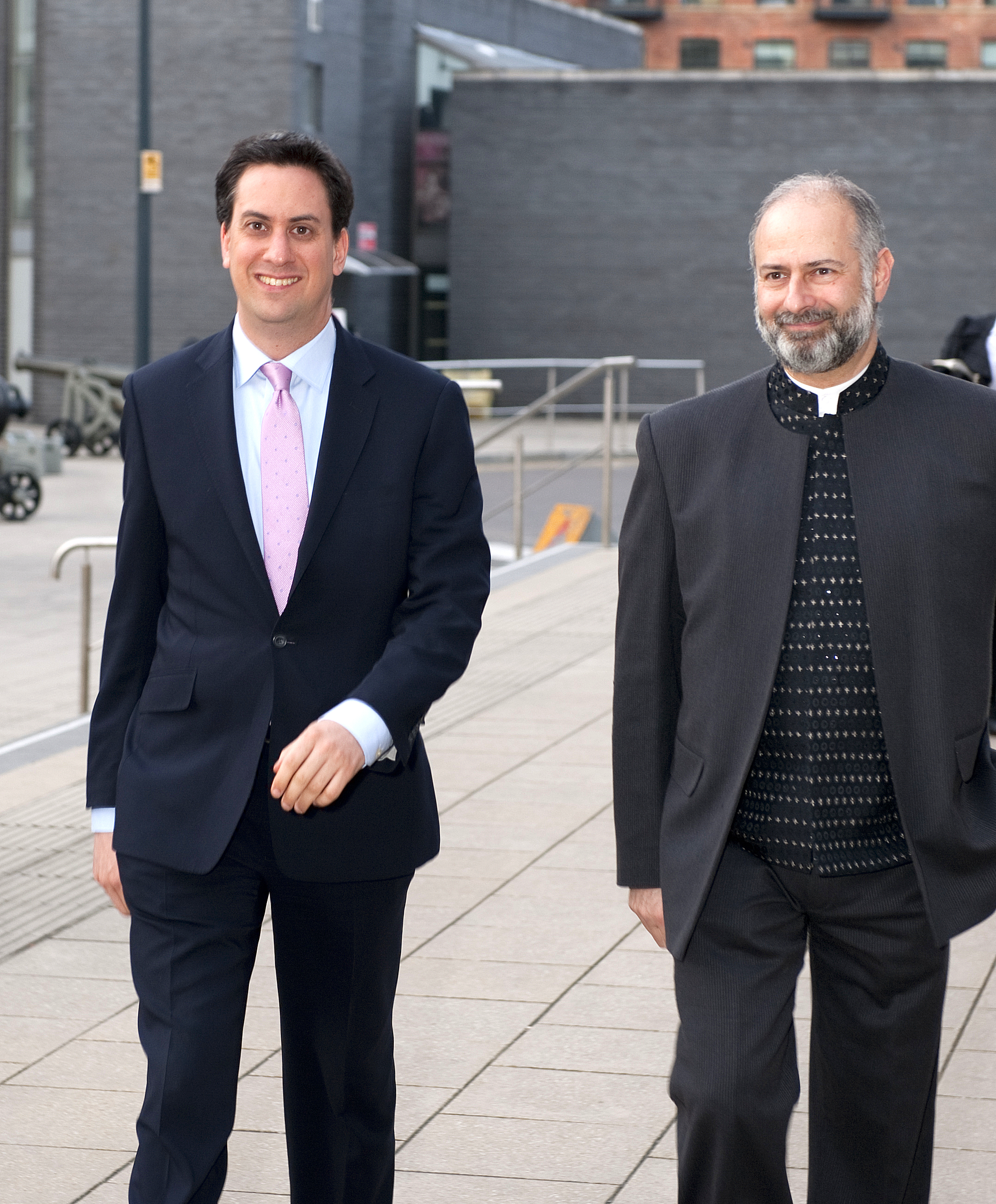
Fabian Hamilton with Labour leader Ed Miliband at the Royal Armouries in Leeds in 2011

== Personal life ==
He married Rosemary in 1980: they have two daughters and a son.

He is a keen cyclist, and once cycled to Aachen, Germany, raising funds for the Funzi and Bodo Trust, a children's charity based in Kenya.

He speaks fluent French.

As a result of mergers, he has successively been a member of Graphical, Paper and Media Union, Amicus, and Unite.

Parliament of the United Kingdom
Preceded by Timothy Kirkhope	Member of Parliament for Leeds North East; 1997–present	Incumbent
Political offices
Preceded by Pat Glass	Shadow Minister of State for Europe; 2016	Succeeded by Khalid Mahmood
New office	Shadow Minister for Peace and Disarmament; 2016–present	Incumbent
