= Derek Fatchett =

Labour Member of Parliament

The Right Honourable Derek Fatchett

Minister of State for the Middle East, North Africa and South Asia
- In office 5 May 1997 – 9 May 1999
- Prime Minister: Tony Blair
- Preceded by: Office established
- Succeeded by: Geoff Hoon

Member of Parliament for Leeds Central
- In office 9 June 1983 – 9 May 1999
- Preceded by: Constituency established
- Succeeded by: Hilary Benn

Personal details
- Born: 22 August 1945 Lincoln, Lincolnshire, England
- Died: 9 May 1999 (aged 53) Wakefield, West Yorkshire, England
- Party: Labour
- Spouse: Anita Bridgens Oakes
- Education: University of Leeds, London School of Economics, University of Birmingham

Derek John Fatchett (22 August 1945 – 9 May 1999) was a British politician. He became Member of Parliament for Leeds Central in 1983 and was a member of the Labour Party. He was Minister of State for Foreign Affairs from 1997 to 1999.

== Early life ==
Born in Lincoln, Lincolnshire, Fatchett was the son of a painter and decorator. His grandfather was a trade union official. He attended the all-male grammar school, Lincoln School and then the University of Birmingham where he studied Law, graduating in 1966. He joined the Labour Party in 1964. At the London School of Economics he took an MSc in 1968 where he joined in student demonstrations. He was more left-wing in his younger days in the 1960s and 1970s but moved towards the centre-left when an MP, leaving the Campaign Group in 1985.

Fatchett was a councillor on Wakefield Metropolitan Council from 1980 to 1984. He became a lecturer in Industrial Relations at the University of Leeds in 1971, staying there until he became an MP. He was selected as the candidate for the new constituency of Leeds Central over Stanley Cohen, who had held the predecessor constituency of Leeds South East, but had considered defecting from the Labour Party to the Social Democratic Party (SDP) and was opposed by the left wing of the constituency party.

== Parliamentary career ==
He contested the Bosworth seat in Leicestershire in 1979.

Following Labour's 1997 election victory, he was made a Minister of State at the Foreign and Commonwealth Office with responsibility for the Middle East, North Africa and South Asia.

Whilst still in office, Fatchett died suddenly on the night of Sunday, 9 May 1999, from a massive heart attack after collapsing whilst in a pub with his wife and a friend. The by-election for his seat was won by Hilary Benn.

== Personal life ==
He married Anita Oakes in Birmingham on 12 April 1969 and had two sons, Brendan and Gareth. He lived in Wakefield.

Parliament of the United Kingdom
New constituency	Member of Parliament for Leeds Central; 1983 – 1999	Succeeded by Hilary Benn
