= Alice in Westminster =

2016 biography by Rachel Reeves

- Author: Rachel Reeves
- Language: English
- Publisher: I.B. Tauris
- Publication date: 2016
- Publication place: United Kingdom
- Media type: Print
- Pages: 448
- ISBN: 9781784537685

Alice in Westminster: The Political Life of Alice Bacon is a 2016 biography of the Labour Party politician Alice Bacon, written by Rachel Reeves.

== Background ==
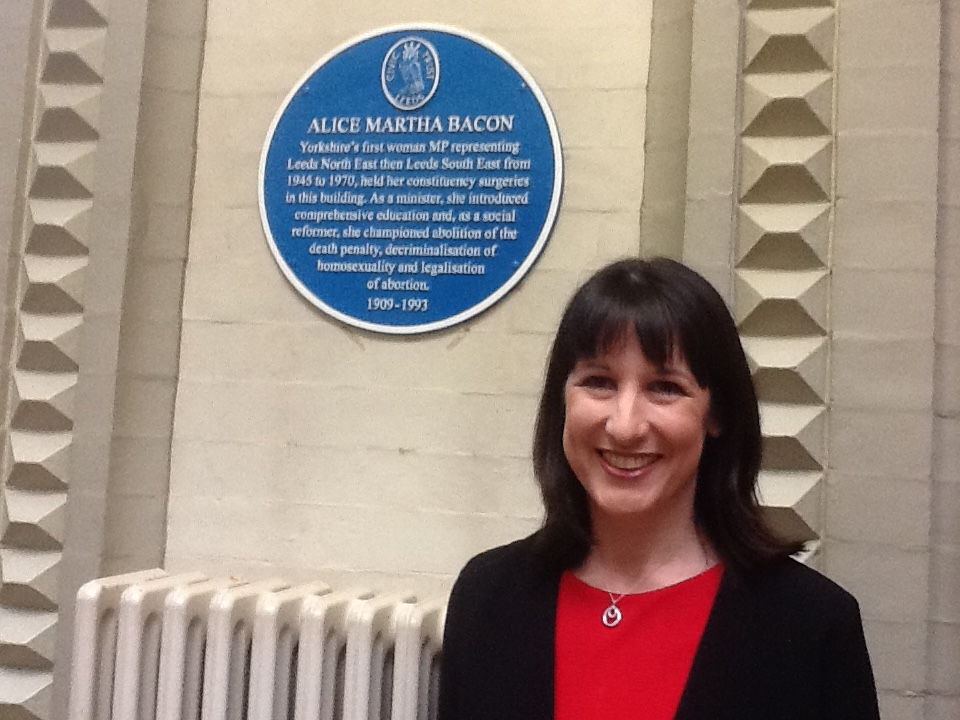
Reeves, with a blue plaque, unveiled in honour of Bacon at the Corn Exchange, Leeds, in 2019

Rachel Reeves was elected in 2010 as a Member of Parliament for Leeds West. At that time she was only the second female MP to represent any Leeds constituency—the first being Alice Bacon. Over four decades, Bacon was instrumental in the development of comprehensive schools, the abolition of Capital punishment, the legalisation of abortion and the decriminalisation of homosexuality. Despite her long tenure and achievements, until Alice in Westminster there was no biography of Bacon, and little written about her in more general Labour histories.

Reeves has said these—along with the debt she feels to Bacon's work normalising women in parliament—were the impetus for the book. The work was written in collaboration with researcher Richard Carr.

== Synopses ==
Alice in Westminster traces Bacon's life from her upbringing in West Yorkshire, through her time as a constituency MP, her appointment as Minister of State at the Home Office, and her long campaign of reform for the British education system.

== Reception ==
David Kynaston, writing in The Observer, found that while Reeves was "[painstaking] and at odd moments, [moving]" in the biography, she was "not a natural biographer", with "too often the focus [being] internalist" containing too many "worthily dull" "long quotations". Likewise, Olivia Dee, in Parliamentary History, thought that while the book shone when concentrating on "small anecdotal details which illustrate these larger ideas and insights into the human side of working in parliament", Reeves move away from this style in some chapters caused those sections to be less "engaging" and "readable".

Rachel Holmes, of the magazine Prospect, on the other hand, felt that "Reeves has done Bacon proud" with a "comprehensive and insightful account" that would be welcomed by those looking for "serious political biography about women". Laura Beers, in the journal Twentieth Century British History, called the work "a thorough political biography that offers a clear record of Bacon's political career and achievements, and asserts her right to be remembered alongside Barbara Castle and Jennie Lee".
