= Gilbert Stone =

British judge and politician

- Born: 1886
- Died: 14 May 1967 (aged 80–81)
- Education: Wrekin College, Caius College, Cambridge
- Occupations: judge, politician
- Political party: Liberal Party
- Spouse: Elsie Lawton Scott (m. 1912)
- Children: 1 son
- Parents: Richard Stone (father); Elizabeth Stone (mother)

Hon. Sir Gilbert Stone (1886 – 14 May 1967), was a British judge and Liberal Party politician.

== Background ==
Stone was born the son of Richard and Elizabeth Stone. He was educated at Wrekin College and Gonville and Caius College, Cambridge. In 1912 he married Elsie Lawton Scott. They had one son.

== Professional career ==
Stone had a career in law. He became a barrister in 1911 and was admitted to Lincoln's Inn. He served as a judge for the High Court of Judicature at Madras, India, from 1930 to 1935. He was knighted in 1936. He served as Chief Justice of the High Court at Nagpur from 1936 to 1943.

== Political career ==
Stone was a supporter of the Coalition Government led by David Lloyd George. He was National Liberal candidate for the Newcastle-upon-Tyne East division at the 1922 general election. He sought to unseat the sitting Liberal MP who opposed the coalition and Stone had the backing of the local Unionist association. The Liberal MP duly lost his seat but to the Labour Party candidate and Stone finished third. Eight months later, he was to contest the 1923 Leeds Central by-election as a Liberal candidate, aiming to take a seat from the Unionists. The Unionists held the seat as Stone finished third again. Lloyd George led his National Liberals into a merger with the Liberal Party and Stone was happy to contest the general election, four months later as a Liberal candidate. He was Liberal candidate for the South Derbyshire division at the 1923 general election. He again finished third, despite polling nearly 30% of the vote. He did not stand for parliament again.

=== Electoral record ===
General Election 1922: Newcastle upon Tyne East
Party	Candidate	Votes	%	±%
Labour	Joseph Nicholas Bell	10,084	43.1	
Liberal	Harry Barnes	6,999	30.0	
National Liberal	Gilbert Stone	6,273	26.9	
Majority		3,085	13.1	
Turnout			73.7	
Labour gain from Liberal		Swing		

1923 Leeds Central by-election
Party	Candidate	Votes	%	±%
Unionist	Charles Henry Wilson	13,085	47.6	−2.4
Labour	Henry Slesser	11,359	41.4	+13.6
Liberal	Gilbert Stone	3,026	11.0	−11.2
Majority		1,726	6.2	−16.0
Turnout			64.3	−1.8
Unionist hold		Swing	-8.0	

General Election 1923: Derbyshire South
Party	Candidate	Votes	%	±%
Unionist	Henry Lorimer	12,902	38.5	−4.1
Labour	Alfred Goodere	10,919	32.7	+3.1
Liberal	Gilbert Stone	9,620	28.8	+1.0
Majority		1,983	5.8	−7.2
Turnout		33,441	75.7	−4.1
Unionist hold		Swing	−3.6	
