= Leeds Central =

UK Parliament constituency (1983–2024)

- Former borough constituency for the House of Commons
- 2010–2024 boundary of Leeds Central in West Yorkshire

- Location of West Yorkshire within England
- County: West Yorkshire
- Electorate: 90,971 (December 2019)
- Major settlements: Leeds

1983–2024
- Seats: One
- Created from: Leeds South, Leeds South East, Leeds East, Leeds West and Leeds North East
- Replaced by: Leeds Central and Headingley; Leeds South

1885–1955
- Created from: Leeds
- Replaced by: Leeds West, Leeds South and Leeds South East

Leeds Central was a constituency represented in the House of Commons of the UK Parliament. The constituency first existed from 1885 until it was abolished in 1955. It was recreated in 1983.

Further to the completion of the 2023 review of Westminster constituencies, the seat was abolished again. Subject to boundary changes involving the loss of most Leeds city centre to the newly created constituency of Leeds Central and Headingley, the seat will be reformed as Leeds South, to be first contested in the 2024 general election.

== Boundaries ==
Map of boundaries 2010–2024

1885–1918: The Municipal Borough of Leeds wards of Mill Hill and West, and parts of the wards of Brunswick and Central.

1918–1950: The County Borough of Leeds wards of Central, Mill Hill, South, and West, and parts of the wards of Brunswick, Headingley, and North West.

1950–1951: The County Borough of Leeds wards of Armley and New Wortley, Blenheim, Central, Holbeck North, Mill Hill, and South and Westfield.

1951–1955: The County Borough of Leeds wards of Blenheim, City, Wellington, and Westfield.

1983–1997: The City of Leeds wards of Beeston, City and Holbeck, Richmond Hill, and University.

1997–2010: As above plus Hunslet.

2010–2024: The City of Leeds wards of Beeston and Holbeck, Burmantofts and Richmond Hill, City and Hunslet, Hyde Park and Woodhouse, and Middleton Park.

Following the Leeds City Council ward boundary changes prior to the 2018 election, the majority of the City and Hunslet ward became the new Hunslet and Riverside ward, whilst Leeds city centre was included in the new Little London and Woodhouse ward. Hyde Park became part of a new Headingley and Hyde Park ward, shared with the Leeds North West constituency.

== Constituency profile ==
The business and retail centre of Leeds was at the constituency's heart. A relatively affluent hub having a large minority of its housing forming by luxury, well-served apartments or streets of grand middle-class Victorian houses, the seat has sporadic deprivation, typified by certain densely packed rows of terraced houses, home to many Labour-inclined and often low-income voters. Two large, well-ranked universities in the city centre, the professional services sector and a 21st-century increase in technology businesses has brought prosperity to the younger generations of the city. The older generations of the city have lived through the closure of many mass consumer product manufacturing and materials processing businesses in Leeds throughout the mid-20th century. Leeds' two universities produce a significant student electorate. Middleton in the south of the seat has a golf course, a miniature railway and an upcoming urban mountain bike trail centre within the boundaries.

Households as at March 2011
Status	Number
Not Deprived in Any Dimension	16,201
Deprived in 1 Dimension	21,519
Deprived in 2 Dimensions	13,586
Deprived in 3 Dimensions	5,205
Deprived in 4 Dimensions	697

== History ==
=== First creation ===
The constituency was created in 1885 by the Redistribution of Seats Act 1885, and was first used in the general election of that year *the large Leeds seat had previously been represented by two MPs (1832–1868) and three MPs (1868–1885)). From 1885 it was represented by five single-member constituencies: Leeds Central, Leeds East, Leeds North, Leeds South and Leeds West. The constituencies of Morley, Otley and Pudsey were also created in 1885. The constituency was abolished in 1955. After the 1955 general election: Leeds was represented by Leeds East (created 1885, abolished 1918, recreated 1955), Leeds North East (created 1918), Leeds North West (created 1950), Leeds South (created 1885), and Leeds South East (created 1918). There were also constituencies of Batley and Morley (created 1918) and Pudsey (created 1885, replaced by Pudsey and Otley 1918–1950).

=== Second creation ===
Revival

The constituency was re-created for the 1983 general election.

Results of the winning party

The seat has been won by the Labour Party's candidate since 1983. Benn, elected in 1999 on the demise of Fatchett, has achieved an absolute majority (plurality of votes) in three of five elections for Leeds Central. The 2015 result made the seat the 40-safest of Labour's 232 seats by percentage of majority.

Opposition parties

Conservative runner-up, Wilson, in 2015 failed to reflect the positive national swing and fell to 17.3% of the votes cast. A candidature of UKIP, not present in 2010, saw a total share of the vote, hence positive swing, of 15.7% and thus third position. (Note: UKIP's swing nationally was +9.5% in 2015). Green Party running, not present in 2010, resulted in a 7.9% polling and fourth-place, its candidate retained his deposit. The fifth-placed Liberal Democrat forfeited her deposit. (Note: The Liberal Democrats's swing nationally was −15.2% in 2015, 1.7% less than in Leeds Central).

Turnout

In general elections, turnout ranged from 87.9% in 1910 to 41.7% in 2001. In its 1999 by-election the constituency experienced the lowest voter turnout post-war of 19.6%.

== Members of Parliament ==
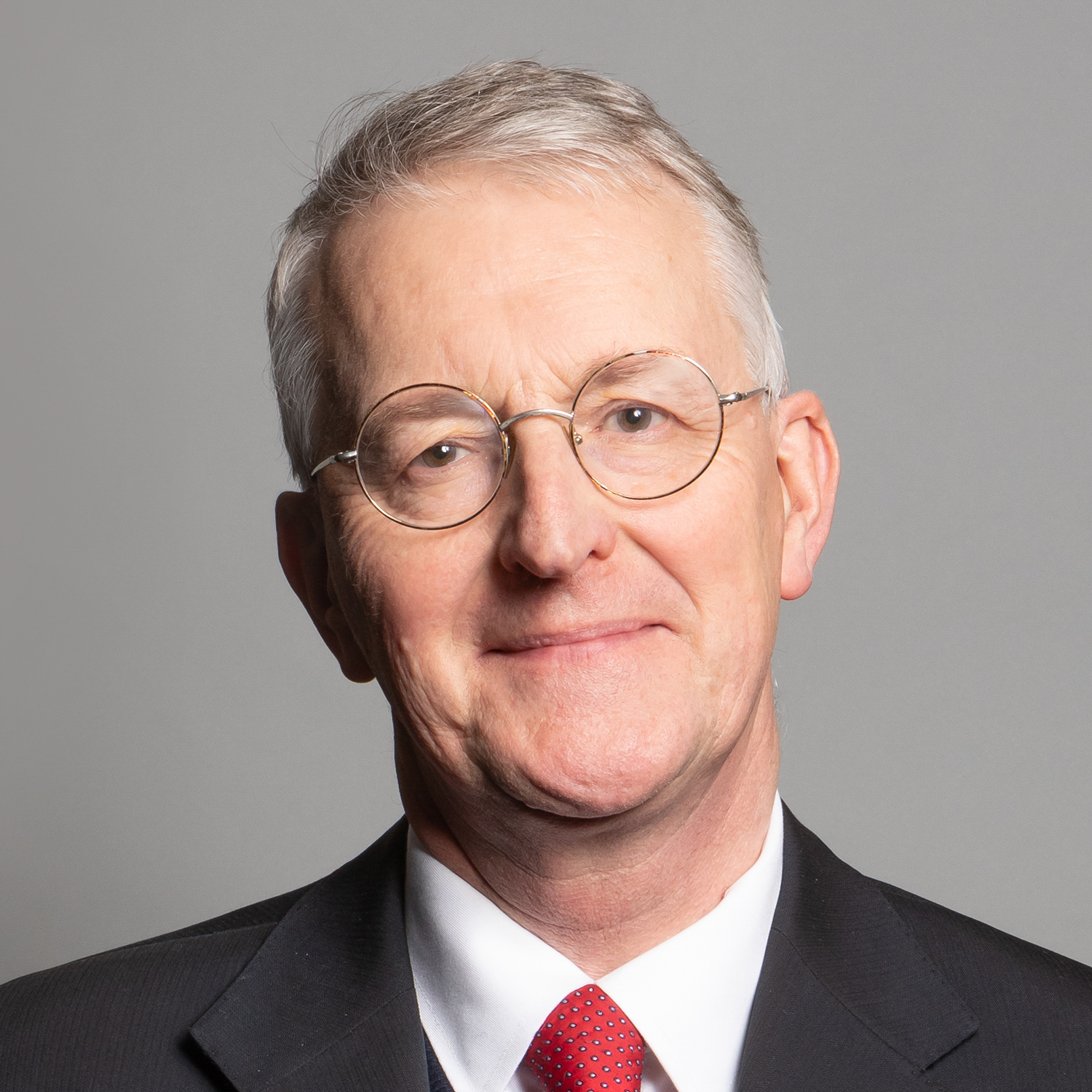
Hilary Benn, Member of Parliament for Leeds Central since 1999

=== MPs 1885–1955 ===
Leeds prior to 1885

Election	Member	Party
1885	Gerald Balfour	Conservative
1906	Robert Armitage	Liberal
1922	Arthur Willey	Conservative
1923 by-election	Sir Charles Wilson	Conservative
1929	Richard Denman	Labour
1931	Richard Denman	National Labour
1945	George Porter	Labour
1955	Constituency abolished	

=== MPs 1983–2024 ===
Leeds South and Leeds South East prior to 1983

Election	Member	Party
1983	Derek Fatchett	Labour
1999 by-election	Hilary Benn	Labour
2024	Constituency abolished	

== Election results 1983–2024 ==
=== Elections in the 1980s ===
General election 1983: Leeds Central
Party	Candidate	Votes	%	±%
Labour	Derek Fatchett	18,706	47.9	
Liberal	Peter Wrigley	10,484	26.9	
Conservative	Michael Ashley-Brown	9,181	23.6	
BNP	G. Cummins	331	0.9	
Communist	J.M. Rogers	314	0.8	
Majority		8,222	21.0	
Turnout		39,030	61.7	
Labour win (new seat)				

General election 1987: Leeds Central
Party	Candidate	Votes	%	±%
Labour	Derek Fatchett	21,270	55.6	+7.7
Conservative	David Schofield	9,765	25.5	+2.0
SDP	Karen Lee	6,853	17.9	−9.0
Communist	William Innis	355	0.9	+0.1
Majority		11,505	30.1	+9.1
Turnout		59,019	64.8	+3.1
Labour hold		Swing		

=== Elections in the 1990s ===
General election 1992: Leeds Central
Party	Candidate	Votes	%	±%
Labour	Derek Fatchett	23,673	62.2	+6.6
Conservative	TC Holdroyd	8,653	22.7	−2.8
Liberal Democrats	David Pratt	5,713	15.0	−2.9
Majority		15,020	39.5	+9.4
Turnout		38,039	61.3	−3.5
Labour hold		Swing	+4.7	

General election 1997: Leeds Central
Party	Candidate	Votes	%	±%
Labour	Derek Fatchett	25,766	69.6	+7.4
Conservative	Edward Wild	5,077	13.7	−9.0
Liberal Democrats	David Freeman	4,164	11.3	−3.7
Referendum	Philip Myers	1,042	2.8	New
Socialist Labour	Mick Rix	656	1.8	New
Socialist	Chris Hill	304	0.8	New
Majority		20,689	55.9	+16.4
Turnout		37,009	54.7	−6.6
Labour hold		Swing	+8.2	

1999 Leeds Central by-election
Party	Candidate	Votes	%	±%
Labour	Hilary Benn	6,361	48.2	−21.4
Liberal Democrats	Peter Wild	4,068	30.8	+19.6
Conservative	Edward Wild	1,618	12.3	−1.4
Green	David Blackburn	478	3.6	New
UKIP	Raymond Northgreaves	353	2.7	New
Leeds Left Alliance	Chris Hill	258	2.0	New
Independent	Julian Fitzgerald	51	0.4	New
Majority		2,293	17.4	−38.5
Turnout		13,187	19.6	−35.1
Labour hold		Swing		

=== Elections in the 2000s ===
General election 2001: Leeds Central
Party	Candidate	Votes	%	±%
Labour	Hilary Benn	18,277	66.9	−2.7
Conservative	Victoria Richmond	3,896	14.3	+0.6
Liberal Democrats	Stewart Arnold	3,607	13.2	+1.9
UKIP	David Burgess	775	2.8	New
Socialist Alliance	Stephen Johnston	751	2.8	New
Majority		14,381	52.6	−3.3
Turnout		27,306	41.7	−12.5
Labour hold		Swing		

General election 2005: Leeds Central
Party	Candidate	Votes	%	±%
Labour	Hilary Benn	17,526	60.0	−6.9
Liberal Democrats	Ruth Coleman	5,660	19.4	+6.2
Conservative	Brian Cattell	3,865	13.2	−1.1
BNP	Mark Collett	1,201	4.1	New
UKIP	Peter Sewards	494	1.7	−1.1
Independent	Mick Dear	189	0.6	New
Independent	Oluwole Taiwo	126	0.4	New
Alliance for Change	Julian Fitzgerald	125	0.4	New
Majority		11,866	40.6	−12.0
Turnout		29,186	46.4	+4.7
Labour hold		Swing		

=== Elections in the 2010s ===
General election 2010: Leeds Central
Party	Candidate	Votes	%	±%
Labour	Hilary Benn	18,434	49.3	−10.2
Liberal Democrats	Michael Taylor	7,789	20.8	−0.7
Conservative	Alan Lamb	7,541	20.2	+7.5
BNP	Kevin Meeson	3,066	8.2	+4.1
Independent	Dave Procter	409	1.1	New
Independent	We Beat The Scum One-Nil	155	0.4	New
Majority		10,645	28.5	–9.5
Turnout		37,394	57.8	+13.5
Labour hold		Swing	−4.8	

General election 2015: Leeds Central
Party	Candidate	Votes	%	±%
Labour	Hilary Benn	24,758	55.0	+5.7
Conservative	Nicola Wilson	7,791	17.3	−2.9
UKIP	Luke Senior	7,082	15.7	New
Green	Michael Hayton	3,558	7.9	New
Liberal Democrats	Emma Spriggs	1,529	3.4	−17.4
TUSC	Liz Kitching	330	0.7	New
Majority		16,967	37.7	+9.2
Turnout		45,048	55.1	–2.7
Labour hold		Swing		

General election 2017: Leeds Central
Party	Candidate	Votes	%	±%
Labour	Hilary Benn	33,453	70.2	+15.2
Conservative	Gareth Davies	9,755	20.5	+3.2
UKIP	Bill Palfreman	2,056	4.3	−11.4
Green	Ed Carlisle	1,189	2.5	−5.4
Liberal Democrats	Andy Nash	1,063	2.2	−1.2
CPA	Alex Coetzee	157	0.3	New
Majority		23,698	49.7	+12.0
Turnout		47,673	53.2	−1.9
Labour hold		Swing	+6.0	

General election 2019: Leeds Central
Party	Candidate	Votes	%	±%
Labour	Hilary Benn	30,413	61.7	−8.5
Conservative	Peter Fortune	11,143	22.6	+2.1
Brexit Party	Paul Thomas	2,999	6.1	New
Liberal Democrats	Jack Holland	2,343	4.8	+2.6
Green	Ed Carlisle	2,105	4.3	+1.8
SDP	William Clouston	281	0.6	New
Majority		19,270	39.1	−10.6
Turnout		49,284	54.2	+1.0
Labour hold		Swing	-5.3	

== Election results 1885–1955 ==
=== Elections in the 1880s ===
General election 1885: Leeds Central
Party	Candidate	Votes	%	±%
Conservative	Gerald Balfour	4,589	51.8	
Liberal	John Barran	4,275	48.2	
Majority		314	3.6	
Turnout		8,864	79.6	
Registered electors		11,135		
Conservative win (new seat)				

General election 1886: Leeds Central
Party	Candidate	Votes	%	±%
Conservative	Gerald Balfour	4,225	50.1	−1.7
Liberal	James Kitson	4,212	49.9	+1.7
Majority		13	0.2	−3.4
Turnout		8,437	75.8	−3.8
Registered electors		11,135		
Conservative hold		Swing	−1.7	

=== Elections in the 1890s ===
General election 1892: Leeds Central
Party	Candidate	Votes	%	±%
Conservative	Gerald Balfour	4,448	50.6	+0.5
Liberal	John Lawson Walton	4,335	49.4	−0.5
Majority		113	1.2	+1.0
Turnout		8,783	86.0	+10.2
Registered electors		10,215		
Conservative hold		Swing	+0.5	

General election 1895: Leeds Central
Party	Candidate	Votes	%	±%
Conservative	Gerald Balfour	4,631	53.8	+3.2
Liberal	Leifchild Jones	3,977	46.2	−3.2
Majority		654	7.6	+6.4
Turnout		8,608	83.1	−2.9
Registered electors		10,353		
Conservative hold		Swing	+3.2	

=== Elections in the 1900s ===
General election 1900: Leeds Central
Party	Candidate	Votes	%	±%
Conservative	Gerald Balfour	4,144	57.7	+3.9
Liberal	Samuel Montagu	3,042	42.3	−3.9
Majority		1,102	15.4	+7.8
Turnout		7,186	73.2	−9.9
Registered electors		9,820		
Conservative hold		Swing	+3.9	

Robert Armitage in 1906

General election 1906: Leeds Central
Party	Candidate	Votes	%	±%
Liberal	Robert Armitage	4,188	57.3	+15.0
Conservative	Gerald Balfour	3,119	42.7	−15.0
Majority		1,069	14.6	N/A
Turnout		7,307	82.2	+9.0
Registered electors		8,893		
Liberal gain from Conservative		Swing	+15.0	

=== Elections in the 1910s ===
General election January 1910: Leeds Central
Party	Candidate	Votes	%	±%
Liberal	Robert Armitage	3,987	54.2	−3.1
Conservative	John Gordon	3,366	45.8	+3.1
Majority		621	8.4	−6.2
Turnout		7,353	87.9	+5.7
Liberal hold		Swing	-3.1	

General election December 1910: Leeds Central
Party	Candidate	Votes	%	±%
Liberal	Robert Armitage	3,519	52.6	−2.6
Conservative	John Gordon	3,169	47.4	+2.6
Majority		350	5.2	−5.2
Turnout		6,688	79.9	−8.0
Liberal hold		Swing	-2.6	

General Election 1914–15:

Another General Election was required to take place before the end of 1915. The political parties had been making preparations for an election to take place and by July 1914, the following candidates had been selected;

- Liberal: Robert Armitage

General election 1918: Leeds Central
Party		Candidate	Votes	%	±%
C	Liberal	Robert Armitage	11,474	70.6	+18.0
	Independent	* Ernest Terry	2,634	16.2	New
	Co-operative Party	Joseph Smith	2,146	13.2	New
Majority			8,840	54.4	+49.2
Turnout			16,254	37.4	−42.5
Registered electors			43,496		
	Liberal hold		Swing	N/A	
C indicates candidate endorsed by the coalition government.

* Terry was supported by the three local branches of National Association of Discharged Sailors and Soldiers, National Federation of Discharged and Demobilized Sailors and Soldiers and Comrades of the Great War.

Robert Armitage in 1922

=== Elections in the 1920s ===
General election 1922: Leeds Central
Party	Candidate	Votes	%	±%
Unionist	Arthur Willey	14,137	50.0	New
Labour	Henry Slesser	7,844	27.8	+14.6
Liberal	Robert Armitage	6,260	22.2	−58.4
Majority		6,293	22.2	N/A
Turnout		28,241	66.1	+28.7
Registered electors		42,738		
Unionist gain from Liberal		Swing	N/A	

1923 Leeds Central by-election
Party	Candidate	Votes	%	±%
Unionist	Charles Wilson	13,085	47.6	−2.4
Labour	Henry Slesser	11,359	41.4	+13.6
Liberal	Gilbert Stone	3,026	11.0	−11.2
Majority		1,726	6.2	−16.0
Turnout		27,470	64.3	−1.8
Registered electors		42,738		
Unionist hold		Swing	−8.0	

General election 1923: Leeds Central
Party	Candidate	Votes	%	±%
Unionist	Charles Wilson	14,853	56.2	+6.2
Labour	Henry Slesser	11,574	43.8	+16.0
Majority		3,279	12.4	−9.8
Turnout		26,427	60.1	−6.0
Registered electors		43,972		
Unionist hold		Swing	−4.9	

General election 1924: Leeds Central
Party	Candidate	Votes	%	±%
Unionist	Charles Wilson	16,182	59.6	+3.4
Labour	E. J. C. Neep	10,975	40.4	−3.4
Majority		5,207	19.2	+6.8
Turnout		27,157	61.0	+0.9
Registered electors		44,532		
Unionist hold		Swing	+3.4	

General election 1929: Leeds Central
Party	Candidate	Votes	%	±%
Labour	Richard Denman	17,322	44.6	+4.2
Unionist	Charles Wilson	15,958	41.0	−18.6
Liberal	Myer Jack Landa	5,607	14.4	New
Majority		1,364	3.6	N/A
Turnout		38,887	68.9	+7.9
Registered electors		56,417		
Labour gain from Unionist		Swing	+11.4	

=== Elections in the 1930s ===
General election 1931: Leeds Central
Party	Candidate	Votes	%	±%
National Labour	Richard Denman	26,496	71.36	N/A
Labour	Moss Turner-Samuels	10,633	28.64	
Majority		15,863	42.72	N/A
Turnout		37,129	66.20	
National Labour gain from Labour		Swing		

General election 1935: Leeds Central
Party	Candidate	Votes	%	±%
National Labour	Richard Denman	17,747	56.43	−14.9
Labour	Fred Lindley	13,701	43.57	+14.9
Majority		4,046	12.86	−29.9
Turnout		31,448	61.44	−4.8
National Labour hold		Swing	−14.9	

=== Elections in the 1940s ===
General election 1945: Leeds Central
Party	Candidate	Votes	%	±%
Labour	George Porter	13,370	57.14	
Conservative	Charles Denman	8,011	34.24	New
Liberal	Basil Mayer Sandelson	2,017	8.62	New
Majority		5,359	22.90	N/A
Turnout		23,398	63.43	
Labour gain from National Labour		Swing		

=== Elections in the 1950s ===
General election 1950: Leeds Central
Party	Candidate	Votes	%	±%
Labour	George Porter	24,030	60.75	+3.6
Conservative	William Barford	13,351	33.75	+2.0
Liberal	Victor Delepine	2,176	5.50	−3.1
Majority		10,679	27.00	+4.1
Turnout		39,557	78.26	+14.8
Labour hold		Swing	+2.1	

General election 1951: Leeds Central
Party	Candidate	Votes	%	±%
Labour	George Porter	23,967	62.35	+1.6
Conservative	William Barford	14,475	37.65	+3.9
Majority		9,492	24.70	−2.3
Turnout		38,442	77.10	−1.2
Labour hold		Swing	−1.2	

== See also ==
- Parliamentary constituencies in West Yorkshire
- 1999 Leeds Central by-election
