= Leeds North East =

Parliamentary constituency in the United Kingdom

Coordinates: 53.850°N 1.515°W

- Borough constituency for the House of Commons
- Boundaries since 2010
- Boundary of Leeds North East in Yorkshire and the Humber
- County: West Yorkshire (West Riding of Yorkshire until 1974)
- Electorate: 70,580 (December 2019)

Current constituency
- Created: 1918
- Member of Parliament: Fabian Hamilton (Labour)
- Seats: One
- Created from: Leeds North, Leeds East and Leeds Central

Leeds North East is a constituency (Note: A borough constituency (for the purposes of election expenses and type of returning officer)) which has been represented in the House of Commons of the UK Parliament since 1997 by Fabian Hamilton of the Labour Party. (Note: As with all constituencies, the constituency elects one Member of Parliament (MP) by the first past the post system of election at least every five years.) (Note: The constituency was created in 1918 as Leeds North-East and the name was changed by loss of the hyphen to Leeds North East in 1950.)

== Constituency profile ==
Leeds North East is a constituency in West Yorkshire. It covers the northern neighbourhoods of the city of Leeds, including Chapeltown, Chapel Allerton, Roundhay, Oakwood, Moortown and Alwoodley. Leeds is one of the United Kingdom's largest cities and grew rapidly during the Industrial Revolution as a centre for textile manufacturing, especially wool. Today the city has a diverse economy and is the largest legal and financial centre in England outside of London. There is some deprivation in inner-city Chapeltown, however this is generally an affluent constituency with many large detached and semi-detached properties, particularly in Moortown and Alwoodley. House prices are similar to the national average and higher than the rest of Yorkshire.

In general, residents of Leeds North East are well-educated and have high rates of income and professional employment. A high proportion work in the health and education sectors. White people made up 64% of the population in the 2021 census. Asians were the largest ethnic minority group at 20%, consisting mainly of Pakistani and Indian communities. Black people were 7% of the population, concentrated in the Chapeltown area. At the local city council, most of the constituency is represented by the Labour Party whilst Alwoodley elected Conservatives. Voters in the constituency strongly supported remaining in the European Union in the 2016 referendum; an estimated 64% voted to remain compared to the nationwide figure of 48%.

== Boundaries ==
1918–1950: The County Borough of Leeds wards of Crossgates, Roundhay, Seacroft, and Shadwell, and parts of the wards of North and North East.

1950–1955: The County Borough of Leeds wards of Burmantofts, Harehills, Potternewton, and Richmond Hill.

1955–1974: The County Borough of Leeds wards of Chapel Allerton, Potternewton, Roundhay, and Woodhouse.

1974–1983: The City of Leeds wards of Chapel Allerton, Harehills, Roundhay, Scott Hall, and Talbot.

1983–2010: The City of Leeds wards of Chapel Allerton, Moortown, North, and Roundhay.

2010–present: The City of Leeds wards of Alwoodley, Chapel Allerton, Moortown, and Roundhay.

History of boundaries

A North-East division of Leeds's parliamentary borough was recommended by the Boundary Commission in its report of 1917. The Commission recommended that the division consist of the whole of the Crossgates, Roundhay, Seacroft, and Shadwell wards, together with the larger parts of two other wards which were to be divided between divisions: North-East ward save for a small part west of Accommodation Road in Burmantofts which was placed in the South-East division and that part of North ward east of Gledhow Park and Moor Allerton. This created a division with a population of 74,054 (according to the 1911 Census); 38,307 lived in the part of North ward, 28,349 in the part of North-East ward, and 7,398 in Roundhay, Seacroft, Shadwell and Cross Gates. Parliament enacted the new boundaries without alteration in the Representation of the People Act 1918.

The initial report of the Boundary Commission in 1947 recommended that the North East division consist of the Burmantofts, Harehills, Potternewton and Roundhay wards. This meant a slightly smaller electorate (in respect of the register in force on 15 October 1946) from 78,498 to a still hefty 66,671; the main change was the removal of Seacroft to the South East division. The Government brought in a Representation of the People Bill based on the recommendations, but after pressure from some affected local authorities, decided give extra seats to some towns and cities where the electorate had resulted in the area narrowly missing out on an additional Member: on 18 March 1948 the Government put down amendments to the Bill which included increasing the number of seats in the County Borough of Leeds from six to seven. The Boundary Commission produced revised recommendations contained the wards of Burmantofts, Harehills and Roundhay, and having an electorate of 51,181. The Boundary Commission consulted on their proposals and received objections to the arrangements in the west of the city which led them to revise the recommendations in May 1948. The alterations had knock-on effects on the North East division, which was now recommended to comprise the North, Roundhay and Woodhouse wards for 56,283 electors.

When the Home Secretary James Chuter Ede proposed altering the Bill in line with the altered recommendations, the sitting MP for Leeds North-East Alice Bacon (supported by George Porter, MP for Leeds Central) moved an amendment to alter the name of a division the Boundary Commission had called 'East Central' to 'North East', and altering the division the Boundary Commission had called 'North East' to 'North'. The Government accepted the amendment, as effected in the Representation of the People Act 1948. The Leeds North East division from then consisted of the Burmantofts, Harehills, Potternewton and Richmond Hill wards and had a 1946 electorate of 49,882. The division was considerably smaller in area after changes in 1950.

Alterations in ward boundaries in Leeds on 28 July 1950 led the Boundary Commission to make an interim report on alterations of constituency boundaries in 1951; although the definition of the constituency was the same, the ward changes had a minor impact on the divisional boundaries. In 1954 the Boundary Commission looked again at boundaries, and recommended that the North East division of Leeds consist of the wards of Allerton, Potternewton, Roundhay and Woodhouse. Three out of the four wards (Allerton, Roundhay and Woodhouse wards) came from the abolished Leeds North, while Burmantofts and Harehills wards were removed to Leeds East, and Richmond Hill ward went to Leeds South East.

By the time of the Second Periodical Report of the Boundary Commission in the late 1960s, the wards of the County Borough of Leeds had again been altered. The commission recommended that the Borough Constituency of Leeds North East consist of the wards of Chapel Allerton, Harehills, Roundhay, Scott Hall and Talbot. The change decreased the electorate (on the October 1968 register) slightly from 53,719 to 53,461. These boundary changes took effect from the February 1974 general election. The Third Periodical Review in 1983 initially proposed a Leeds North East County Constituency comprising 33,200 electors out of 60,120 in the existing borough together with half of the previous Leeds North West seat and Harewood and Wetherby from the Barkston Ash seat. At a public inquiry the plans were challenged and the assistant Commissioner recommended that the Leeds North East constituency remain urban and based on the previous seat, comprising Chapel Allerton, Moortown, North and Roundhay wards; this alteration was accepted by the Boundary Commission. The changes still removed 10,000 electors, mostly to Leeds East but some to Leeds Central and Elmet, and brought in 16,000 electors, mostly from Leeds North West and Barkston Ash and a small number from Leeds South East. No changes were made in the Fourth Periodical Review in 1995.

Current boundaries

Boundary changes implemented under the Fifth Periodic Review of Westminster constituencies which took effect at the 2010 general election — their final recommendations matched initial proposals — resulted in the seat comprising the City of Leeds wards of Alwoodley, Chapel Allerton, Moortown and Roundhay. By these changes, 2,100 electors out of 64,106 in the existing seat were removed to Elmet and Rothwell, while 3,875 were added from Leeds North West, 700 from Leeds Central, and 349 from Leeds East. As a result of the 2023 Periodic Review of Westminster constituencies the composition of the constituency which came into effect for the 2024 general election was unchanged, apart from very minor changes due to modifications to ward boundaries.

== History ==
At the first election in 1918, it was decided that a Conservative candidate would receive the Coalition 'coupon' in Leeds North East, as four Liberals had received coupons in other Leeds divisions and Labour was allowed an unopposed return in Leeds South-East. Major John Birchall, the Coalition Conservative candidate, was opposed by Labour Party candidate John Bromley, leader of the Locomotive Engineman's Society. The Times described Bromley as "prone to verbal violence" and with "an unnecessary railway strike in his war service record". A third candidate, Captain W.P. Brigstock, announced himself for the National Party, but was felt to have negligible prospects and did not stand. Birchall won comfortably, and went on to represent the seat until he retired in February 1940. His majority never fell below 4,000.

Birchall's resignation resulted in a by-election in March 1940, Professor J.J. Craik Henderson was nominated as a Conservative. Under the war-time electoral truce no Labour or Liberal candidate stood, but he was opposed by Sydney Allen of the British Union of Fascists who campaigned on an anti-war policy. Henderson won the by-election with 97.1% of the vote. Despite the division's history, Labour went into the 1945 general election with a degree of optimism. As it turned out Professor Craik Henderson could not defend his seat, and Alice Bacon won for Labour on a 22.6% swing.

The constituency with new boundaries at the 1950 election was reckoned to be helpful to Alice Bacon, and therefore likely to be held by Labour. She indeed held the seat at both the 1950 and 1951 general elections.

The complex changes to Leeds' Parliamentary boundaries in 1955, which reduced the city from seven seats to six, particularly affected Leeds North East which was reckoned to be the seat which was abolished. In the event Alice Bacon was selected in Leeds South East, while that seat's sitting MP Denis Healey was selected for the new Leeds East constituency. George Porter, sitting MP for Leeds Central, failed to be selected for any new seat when his constituency was abolished and retired. The new North East division was effectively based on the old North division, and that seat's sitting Conservative MP Osbert Peake came forward as candidate. He was thought to have a slightly less safe seat in the new Leeds North East. Peake won easily, and after he received a peerage, his successor Sir Keith Joseph held on in a 1956 by-election.

Joseph had a relatively safe seat at first but his majority fell in the elections of the 1960s. At the 1970 general election, it was noted that the seat had the highest immigrant population among the constituencies in Leeds, and had also produced the smallest swing to the Conservatives at that election. The 1979 general election saw the constituency swing to Labour, against the national trend; in 1987 it was noted that while the Conservatives had held the seat, they had done poorly in terms of votes.

In the run-up to the 1997 general election, the seat was a target for the Labour Party. The Leeds North East Constituency Labour Party selected Liz Davies, an Islington councillor on the party's left wing, but the Labour Party National Executive Committee refused to endorse her candidacy over connections to the Labour Briefing magazine; her appeal to the Labour Party conference was unsuccessful. The winner of the second selection, Fabian Hamilton, was identified as a Blairite and comfortably gained the seat when the election was called. The result of the 2010 general election saw Hamilton retain the seat, with a further pro-Labour swing in 2015 and a majority of nearly 17,000 in 2017, the largest since Labour gained the seat two decades ago. Although Hamilton's share of the vote fell in 2019, the Conservative share fell further and his majority increased to over 17,000.

Prior to the 2019 general election, the Labour Party did MRP analysis. During that analysis, they concluded that, under the current circumstances and without any intervention, Leeds North East would change hands to the Liberal Democrats.

== Members of Parliament ==
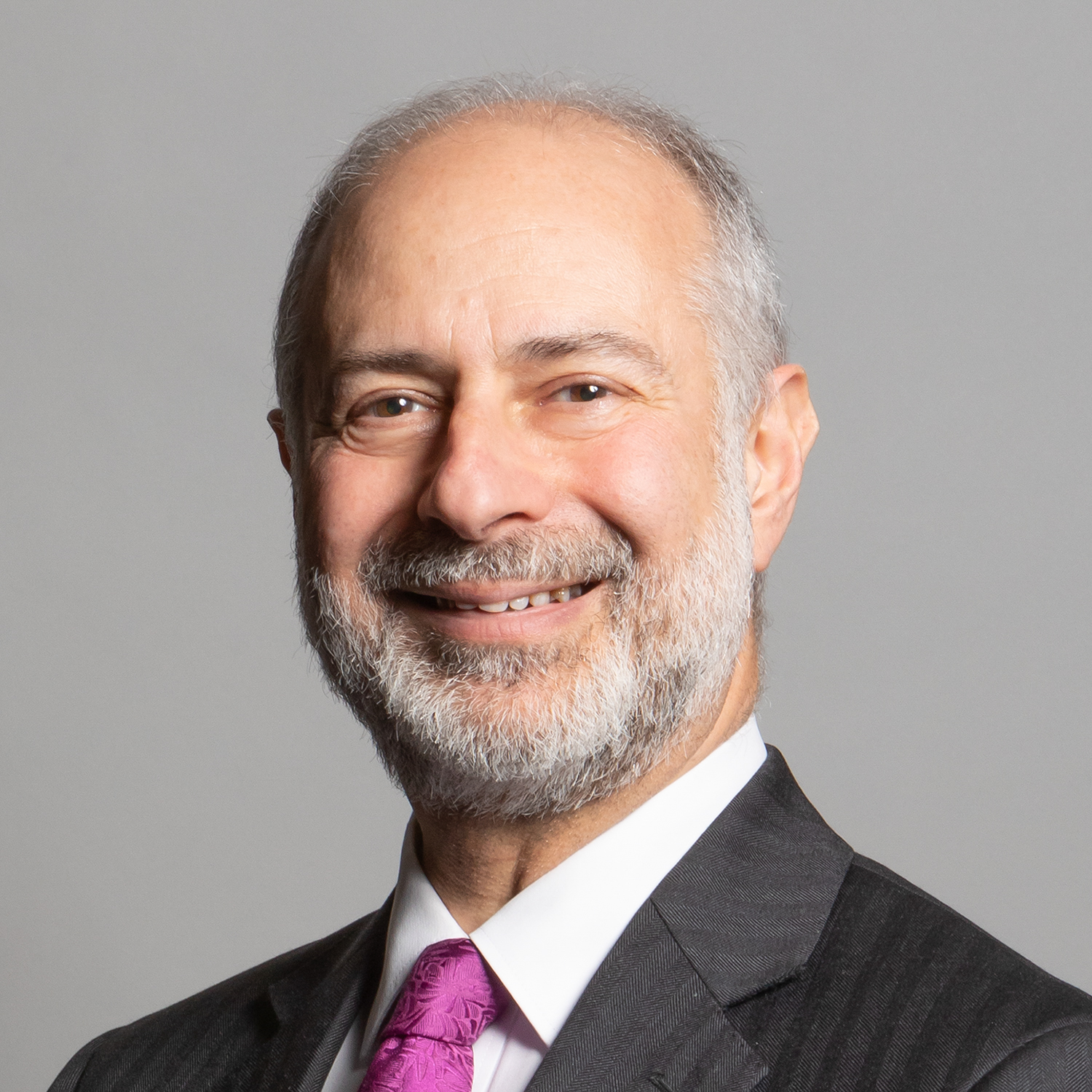
Fabian Hamilton, Member of Parliament for Leeds North East since 1997

Election	Member	Party
1918	John Birchall	Conservative
1940 by-election	John Craik-Henderson	Conservative
1945	Alice Bacon	Labour
1955	Osbert Peake	Conservative
1956 by-election	Keith Joseph	Conservative
1987	Timothy Kirkhope	Conservative
1997	Fabian Hamilton	Labour

== Elections ==
=== Elections in the 2020s ===
General election 2024: Leeds North East
Party	Candidate	Votes	%	±%
Labour	Fabian Hamilton	23,260	51.5	−6.0
Conservative	Chris Whiteside	7,177	15.9	−7.7
Green	Louise Jennings	5,911	13.1	+9.3
Reform	Kieran White	3,426	7.6	+4.1
Liberal Democrats	Gary Busuttil	2,168	4.8	−6.4
Workers Party	Dawud Islam	2,067	4.6	N/A
Yorkshire	Ian Cowling	574	1.3	N/A
Alliance for Green Socialism	Mike Davies	259	0.6	+0.3
SDP	Cordelia Lynan	125	0.3	N/A
CPA	Christopher Nicholson	109	0.2	N/A
Climate	Stewart Hey	91	0.2	N/A
Majority		16,083	35.6	+1.8
Turnout		45,167	64.4	−6.8
Registered electors		70,178		
Labour hold		Swing	▲0.9	

=== Elections in the 2010s ===
General election 2019: Leeds North East
Party	Candidate	Votes	%	±%
Labour	Fabian Hamilton	29,024	57.5	−5.6
Conservative	Amjad Bashir^{1}	11,935	23.6	−7.4
Liberal Democrats	Jon Hannah	5,665	11.2	+7.5
Green	Rachel Hartshorne	1,931	3.8	+2.5
Brexit Party	Inaya Folarin Iman	1,769	3.5	N/A
Alliance for Green Socialism	Celia Foote	176	0.3	+0.1
Majority		17,089	33.9	+1.8
Turnout		50,500	71.6	−4.2
Labour hold		Swing	+0.9	

^{1} The Conservative Party suspended Amjad Bashir on 20 November 2019. He still appeared on ballot papers under the Conservative label, as nominations had closed by the time of the suspension.

General election 2017: Leeds North East
Party	Candidate	Votes	%	±%
Labour	Fabian Hamilton	33,436	63.1	+15.2
Conservative	Ryan Stephenson	16,445	31.0	−1.9
Liberal Democrats	Jon Hannah	1,952	3.7	−1.6
Green	Ann Forsaith	680	1.3	−4.0
Yorkshire	Tess Seddon	303	0.6	N/A
Alliance for Green Socialism	Celia Foote	116	0.2	−0.7
CPA	Tim Mutamiri	67	0.1	N/A
Majority		16,991	32.1	+17.1
Turnout		52,999	75.6	+5.7
Labour hold		Swing	+8.5	

General election 2015: Leeds North East
Party	Candidate	Votes	%	±%
Labour	Fabian Hamilton	23,137	47.9	+5.2
Conservative	Simon Wilson	15,887	32.9	−0.2
UKIP	Warren Hendon	3,706	7.7	+5.9
Liberal Democrats	Aqila Choudhry	2,569	5.3	−14.3
Green	Emma Carter	2,541	5.3	N/A
Alliance for Green Socialism	Celia Foote	451	0.9	−0.4
Majority		7,250	15.0	+5.4
Turnout		48,291	69.9	−0.1
Labour hold		Swing	+2.7	

General election 2010: Leeds North East
Party	Candidate	Votes	%	±%
Labour	Fabian Hamilton	20,287	42.7	−3.0
Conservative	Matthew Lobley	15,742	33.1	+2.9
Liberal Democrats	Aqila Choudhry	9,310	19.6	−2.1
UKIP	Warren Hendon	842	1.8	N/A
BNP	Thomas Redmond	758	1.6	N/A
Alliance for Green Socialism	Celia Foote	596	1.3	−1.2
Majority		4,545	9.6	−5.9
Turnout		47,535	70.0	+4.5
Labour hold		Swing	-2.95	

=== Elections in the 2000s ===
General election 2005: Leeds North East
Party	Candidate	Votes	%	±%
Labour	Fabian Hamilton	18,632	44.9	−4.2
Conservative	Matthew Lobley	13,370	32.2	+0.9
Liberal Democrats	Jonathan Brown	8,427	20.3	+4.4
Alliance for Green Socialism	Celia Foote	1,038	2.5	+0.6
Majority		5,262	12.7	−5.1
Turnout		41,467	65.5	+3.5
Labour hold		Swing	-2.55	

General election 2001: Leeds North East
Party	Candidate	Votes	%	±%
Labour	Fabian Hamilton	19,540	49.1	−0.1
Conservative	Owain Rhys	12,451	31.3	−2.6
Liberal Democrats	Jonathan Brown	6,325	15.9	+2.0
Leeds Left Alliance	Celia Foote	770	1.9	N/A
UKIP	Jeffrey Miles	382	1.0	N/A
Socialist Labour	Colin Muir	173	0.4	−0.6
Independent	Mohammed Zaman	132	0.3	N/A
Majority		7,089	17.8	+2.5
Turnout		39,773	62.0	−9.8
Labour hold		Swing	+1.25	

=== Elections in the 1990s ===
General election 1997: Leeds North East
Party	Candidate	Votes	%	±%
Labour	Fabian Hamilton	22,368	49.2	+12.4
Conservative	Timothy Kirkhope	15,409	33.9	−11.5
Liberal Democrats	William Winlow	6,318	13.9	−2.8
Referendum	Ian Rose	946	2.1	N/A
Socialist Labour	Jan Egan	468	1.0	N/A
Majority		6,959	15.3	N/A
Turnout		45,509	71.8	−4.8
Labour gain from Conservative		Swing	+11.9	

General election 1992: Leeds North East
Party	Candidate	Votes	%	±%
Conservative	Timothy Kirkhope	22,462	45.4	−0.2
Labour	Fabian Hamilton	18,218	36.8	+11.6
Liberal Democrats	Christopher Walmsley	8,274	16.7	−11.6
Green	John Noble	546	1.1	+0.2
Majority		4,244	8.6	−8.7
Turnout		49,500	76.6	+1.3
Conservative hold		Swing	-5.9	

=== Elections in the 1980s ===
General election 1987: Leeds North East
Party	Candidate	Votes	%	±%
Conservative	Timothy Kirkhope	22,196	45.6	−2.0
SDP	Peter Crystal	13,777	28.3	+0.2
Labour	Owen Glover	12,292	25.2	+1.5
Green	Claire Nash	416	0.9	N/A
Majority		8,419	17.3	−2.2
Turnout		48,681	75.3	+4.6
Conservative hold		Swing	-1.1	

General election 1983: Leeds North East
Party	Candidate	Votes	%	±%
Conservative	Keith Joseph	21,940	47.6	−6.5
SDP	Peter Crystal	12,945	28.1	+15.4
Labour	Ronald Sedler	10,951	23.7	−7.3
Anti-Corruption	Ernest Tibbitts	128	0.3	+0.1
Against Cuts in Education	Paul Holton	123	0.3	N/A
Majority		8,995	19.5	+6.5
Turnout		46,087	70.7	+0.6
Conservative hold		Swing	-10.95	

=== Elections in the 1970s ===
General election 1979: Leeds North East
Party	Candidate	Votes	%	±%
Conservative	Keith Joseph	20,297	48.96	+0.40
Labour	Ronald Henry Sedler	14,913	35.97	+1.98
Liberal	Roy Hollingworth	5,329	12.85	−4.60
Ecology	Sara Parkin	813	1.96	N/A
Anti-Corruption	Ernest Leonard Tibbitts	103	0.25	N/A
Majority		5,384	12.99	−1.6
Turnout		41,455	70.1	+4.6
Conservative hold		Swing	-0.80	

General election October 1974: Leeds North East
Party	Candidate	Votes	%	±%
Conservative	Keith Joseph	18,749	48.56	+0.72
Labour	John Gunnell	13,121	33.99	+2.83
Liberal	Christopher John Greenfield	6,737	17.45	−2.86
Majority		5,628	14.6	−2.0
Turnout		38,607	65.5	+8.9
Conservative hold		Swing	-1.05	

General election February 1974: Leeds North East
Party	Candidate	Votes	%	±%
Conservative	Keith Joseph	20,822	47.8	−9.2
Labour	John Gunnell	13,562	31.2	−11.8
Liberal	Christopher John Greenfield	8,839	20.3	N/A
PEOPLE	Clive Lord	300	0.7	N/A
Majority		7,260	16.6	+2.6
Turnout		43,523	74.4	+9.0
Conservative hold		Swing	+1.3	

General election 1970: Leeds North East
Party	Candidate	Votes	%	±%
Conservative	Keith Joseph	20,720	57.0	+0.2
Labour	Alan John Patient	15,653	43.0	−0.2
Majority		5,067	14.0	+0.4
Turnout		36,373	65.4	−2.7
Conservative hold		Swing	+0.2	

=== Elections in the 1960s ===
General election 1966: Leeds North East
Party	Candidate	Votes	%	±%
Conservative	Keith Joseph	20,813	56.8	−3.9
Labour	David Arthur Mallen	15,851	43.2	+3.9
Majority		4,962	13.6	−7.8
Turnout		36,664	68.1	−3.0
Conservative hold		Swing	-3.9	

General election 1964: Leeds North East
Party	Candidate	Votes	%	±%
Conservative	Keith Joseph	23,613	60.7	−3.4
Labour	Kevin Gould	15,288	39.3	+3.4
Majority		8,325	21.4	−6.8
Turnout		38,901	71.1	−3.9
Conservative hold		Swing	-3.4	

=== Elections in the 1950s ===
General election 1959: Leeds North East
Party	Candidate	Votes	%	±%
Conservative	Keith Joseph	26,240	64.1	+2.7
Labour	Harry Mordecai Waterman	14,709	35.9	−2.7
Majority		11,531	28.2	+5.4
Turnout		40,949	75.0	+1.9
Conservative hold		Swing	+2.7	

By-election, 9 February 1956: Leeds North East
Party	Candidate	Votes	%	±%
Conservative	Keith Joseph	14,081	63.2	+1.8
Labour	Harry Mordecai Waterman	8,212	36.8	−1.8
Majority		5,869	26.4	+3.6
Turnout		22,293	39.9	−33.2
Conservative hold		Swing	+1.8	

General election 1955: Leeds North East
Party	Candidate	Votes	%	±%
Conservative	Osbert Peake	24,902	61.4	+19.7
Labour	Harry Mordecai Waterman	15,623	38.6	−19.7
Majority		9,279	22.8	N/A
Turnout		40,525	73.1	−7.8
Conservative gain from Labour		Swing	+19.7	

General election 1951: Leeds North East
Party	Candidate	Votes	%	±%
Labour	Alice Bacon	22,402	58.3	+3.7
Conservative	John Bidgood	15,991	41.7	+4.4
Majority		6,411	16.6	−0.7
Turnout		38,393	80.9	−1.4
Labour hold		Swing	-0.35	

General election 1950: Leeds North East
Party	Candidate	Votes	%	±%
Labour	Alice Bacon	21,599	54.6	+1.5
Conservative	John Bidgood	14,780	37.3	−0.2
Liberal	William George Victor Jones	2,612	6.6	−2.8
Communist	Bert Ramelson	612	1.5	N/A
Majority		6,819	17.3	+1.7
Turnout		39,603	82.3	+10.6
Labour hold		Swing	+0.85	

=== Elections in the 1940s ===
General election 1945: Leeds North East
Party	Candidate	Votes	%	±%
Labour	Alice Bacon	28,870	53.1	+17.9
Conservative	John Craik-Henderson	20,406	37.5	−27.3
Liberal	Frank Clay Wilson	5,097	9.4	N/A
Majority		8,464	15.6	N/A
Turnout		54,373	71.7	+5.6
Labour gain from Conservative		Swing	+22.6	

By-election, 13 March 1940: Leeds North East
Party	Candidate	Votes	%	±%
Conservative	John Craik-Henderson	23,882	97.1	+32.3
British Union	Sydney Allen	772	2.9	N/A
Majority		23,160	94.2	+64.6
Turnout		24,604	34.9	−31.2
Conservative hold		Swing		

=== Elections in the 1930s ===
General election 1935: Leeds North East
Party	Candidate	Votes	%	±%
Conservative	John Birchall	25,915	64.8	−10.7
Labour	Alfred Dobbs	14,080	35.2	+10.7
Majority		11,835	29.6	−21.4
Turnout		39,995	66.1	−7.5
Conservative hold		Swing	-10.7	

General election 1931: Leeds North East
Party	Candidate	Votes	%	±%
Conservative	John Birchall	31,671	75.5	+28.5
Labour	Alfred Dobbs	10,294	24.5	−8.0
Majority		21,377	51.0	+36.5
Turnout		41,965	73.6	−0.7
Conservative hold		Swing	+18.25	

=== Elections in the 1920s ===
General election 1929: Leeds North East
Party	Candidate	Votes	%	±%
Unionist	John Birchall	18,877	47.0	−10.8
Labour	David Freeman	13,050	32.5	+0.9
Liberal	Charles Humphrey Boyle	8,253	20.5	+9.9
Majority		5,827	14.5	−11.7
Turnout		40,180	74.3	−0.3
Unionist hold		Swing	-5.85	

General election 1924: Leeds North East
Party	Candidate	Votes	%	±%
Unionist	John Birchall	16,396	57.8	+11.1
Labour Co-op	Edna Martha Penny	8,984	31.6	+0.3
Liberal	George Redfern Woodcock	3,007	10.6	−11.4
Majority		7,412	26.2	+10.8
Turnout		28,387	74.6	+0.7
Unionist hold		Swing	+5.4	

General election 1923: Leeds North East
Party	Candidate	Votes	%	±%
Unionist	John Birchall	12,767	46.7	+0.6
Labour Co-op	Frank Fountain	8,574	31.3	+6.9
Liberal	Ronald Walker	6,030	22.0	−7.5
Majority		4,193	15.4	−1.2
Turnout		27,371	73.9	−0.3
Unionist hold		Swing	-3.15	

General election 1922: Leeds North East
Party	Candidate	Votes	%	±%
Unionist	John Birchall	12,343	46.1	−29.4
Liberal	Ronald Walker	7,891	29.5	N/A
Labour	John Badlay	6,525	24.4	−0.1
Majority		4,452	16.6	−34.4
Turnout		26,759	74.2	+22.3
Unionist hold		Swing	-29.45	

=== Elections in the 1910s ===
General election 1918: Leeds North East
Party		Candidate	Votes	%	±%
C	Unionist	John Birchall	14,450	75.5	
	Labour	John Bromley	4,680	24.5	
Majority			9,770	51.0	
Turnout			19,130	51.9	
	Unionist win (new seat)				
C indicates candidate endorsed by the coalition government.

== See also ==
- List of parliamentary constituencies in West Yorkshire
- List of parliamentary constituencies in the Yorkshire and the Humber (region)
