= Stan Cohen (politician) =

British politician

Stanley Cohen (31 July 1927 – 23 February 2004) was a British Labour Party politician. He was on the trade unionist right-wing of the party during the early 1980s struggle for control of the party, and as such suffered deselection at the hands of his constituency party.

== Early life ==
Cohen was of Irish descent and was educated at St. Patrick and St. Charles Roman Catholic schools in Leeds. After service in the Royal Navy from 1945 to 1947, he moved into the tailoring/clothing industry. From 1951 he was employed in the estate department of British Railways and became an executive member of the Transport Salaried Staffs' Association. Cohen was a councillor on Leeds City Council from 1952 and chaired Leeds South East Constituency Labour Party. Cohen contested Barkston Ash in 1966.

== Parliamentary career ==
He was Member of Parliament for Leeds South East from 1970 to 1983, when that constituency was abolished, but in 1981 he was clearly in trouble with his constituency Labour Party (CLP) which was controlled by the left. He publicly mentioned that he was considering following Tom Bradley, the former leader of his union, into the SDP. Labour Party leader Michael Foot persuaded him to remain in the Labour Party and not defect at a meeting on 3 December 1981. Later that day Foot denounced Peter Tatchell, a left-wing candidate who had been selected in Bermondsey; Cohen told The Guardian "Maybe it had nothing to do with me, but I would like to believe our discussion might have helped him to make his stand". However, when the CLP moved to a reselection ballot for Leeds Central, which took in much of what was Leeds South East, they instead chose the left-winger Derek Fatchett.

Parliament of the United Kingdom
Preceded by Alice Bacon	Member of Parliament for Leeds South East; 1970–1983	Constituency abolished
