= John Dearman Birchall =

British politician

Birchall in 1930.

Major Sir John Dearman Birchall TD (26 September 1875 – 6 January 1941) was a British soldier and Conservative Party politician. Son of Dearman Birchall (1828–1897), he was elected as Member of Parliament (MP) for Leeds North East at the 1918 general election, and held his seat in the House of Commons for 22 years until he resigned on 8 February 1940 through appointment as Steward of the Chiltern Hundreds.

Parliament of the United Kingdom
New constituency	Member of Parliament for Leeds North East; 1918–1940	Succeeded by John Craik-Henderson
Church of England titles
Preceded by Sir William Mount	Second Church Estates Commissioner; 1923–1924	Succeeded by George Middleton
Preceded by George Middleton	Second Church Estates Commissioner; 1924–1929	Succeeded by George Middleton
