= Bill Brain =

British socialist activist

William Thomas Edward Brain (1891 – 1961) was a British socialist activist.

Born in Birmingham, Brain became an engineer and joined the Friendly Society of Iron Founders, then later, the Transport and General Workers' Union. He also joined the Socialist Labour Party (SLP), and led the Wolverhampton Unemployed Workers' Committee..

Many members of the SLP were inspired by the October Revolution in Russia, with some forming a Communist Unity Group, aiming to form a single, national, communist party. Brain did not join the Communist Unity Group, but he nevertheless attended the founding conference of the Communist Party of Great Britain, representing the Birmingham SLP.

Brain joined the new party, and at its third congress, in 1921, he was elected to its executive committee. He became the party's Birmingham organiser, served on the British Bureau of the Red International of Labour Unions, and was also its Midlands organiser. He was imprisoned in 1921 for his communist activities, but was soon released. In 1922, he was elected as vice-president of the Birmingham Trades Council.

Brain's last stint on the CPGB executive was in 1927, after which he remained in the party, but was less prominent. He stood in the 1929 Leeds South East by-election, but took only 4.2% of the vote, against a single opponent.
