= 1999 Leeds Central by-election =

UK Parliamentary by-election

- 10 June 1999
- Turnout: 19.9%
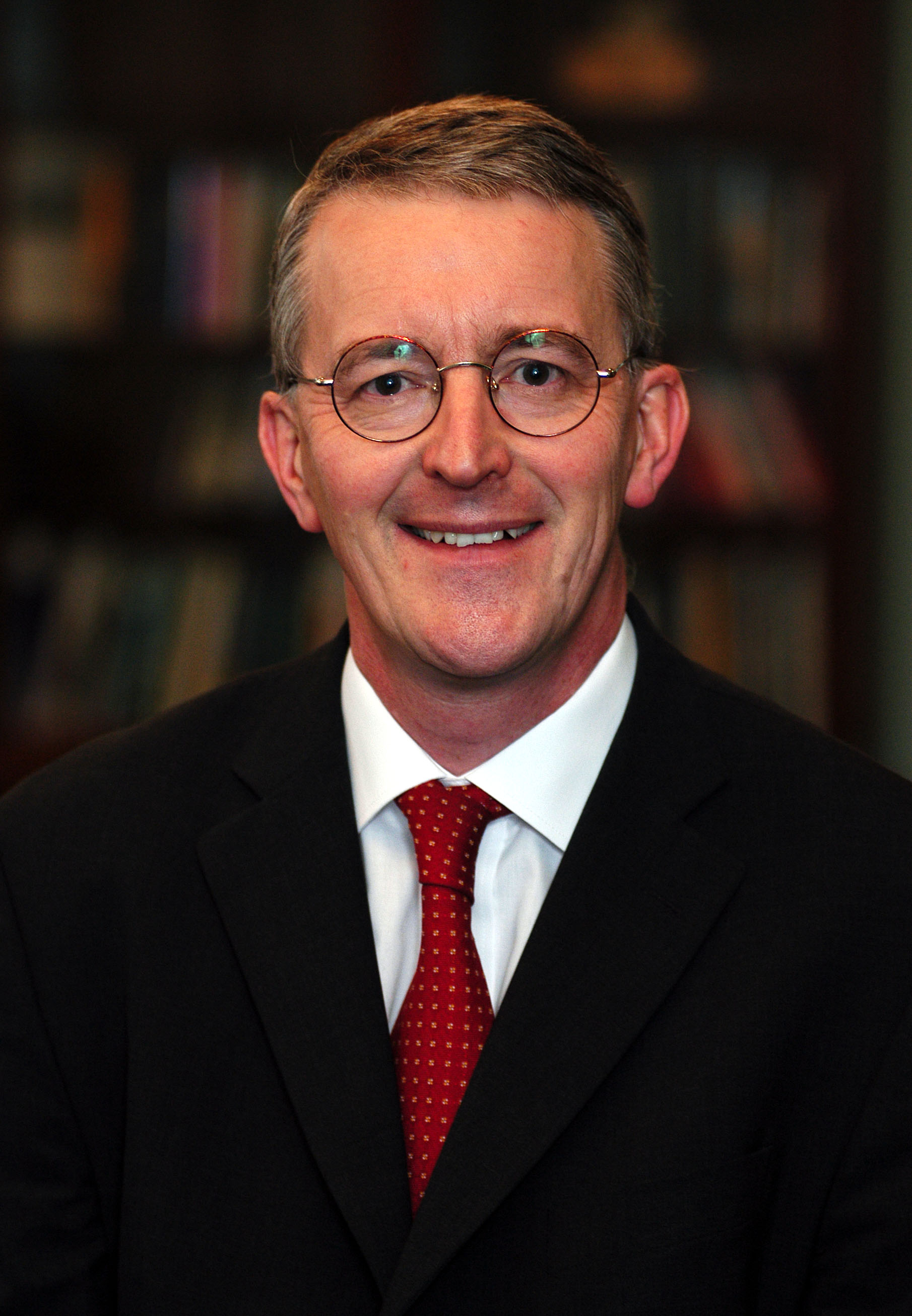
	First party	Second party	Third party
Candidate	Hilary Benn	Peter Wild	Edward Wild
Party	Labour	Liberal Democrats	Conservative
Popular vote	6,361	4,068	1,618
Percentage	48.2%	30.8%	12.3%
Swing	▼21.4pp	▲19.6pp	▼1.4pp
MP before election
Derek Fatchett
Labour
Elected MP
Hilary Benn
Labour

A by-election for the United Kingdom parliamentary constituency of Leeds Central was held on 10 June 1999, triggered by the death of incumbent Labour Member of Parliament (MP) Derek Fatchett. It was won by Hilary Benn – the son of veteran Labour MP Tony Benn – who held the seat for the party.

Following Fatchett's sudden death on 9 May 1999, the Labour government rushed to organise for the by-election and moved the writ so that the election could be held on 10 June, the same day as elections to the European Parliament.

The shortlist for the Labour candidacy included the Chair of Leeds Central Constituency Labour Party, Maggie Giles-Hill, and Shahid Malik, but the selection went to Hilary Benn who had been Special Adviser to David Blunkett, then Secretary of State for Education and Employment. The Conservatives chose their general election candidate Edward Wild. The Liberal Democrats provided the strongest challenge and increased their vote by nearly 20%, but this was not enough to take the seat.

The campaign was subsumed with the European Parliament elections, and the result was an all-time low turnout for a by-election: at 19.9% it held the record for the lowest turnout in a UK parliamentary election since World War II, until surpassed in 2012 by the Manchester Central by-election.

== Result ==
Leeds Central by-election, 1999
Party	Candidate	Votes	%	±%
Labour	Hilary Benn	6,361	48.2	–21.4
Liberal Democrats	Peter Wild	4,068	30.8	+19.6
Conservative	Edward Wild	1,618	12.3	–1.4
Green	David Blackburn	478	3.6	New
UKIP	Raymond Northgreaves	353	2.7	New
Leeds Left Alliance	Chris Hill	258	2.0	New
Independent	Julian Fitzgerald	51	0.4	New
Majority		2,293	17.4	−38.5
Turnout		13,187	19.9	–34.8
Labour hold		Swing		

== General Election result, 1997 ==
General election 1997: Leeds Central
Party	Candidate	Votes	%	±%
Labour	Derek Fatchett	25,766	69.6	
Conservative	Edward Wild	5,077	13.7	
Liberal Democrats	David Freeman	4,164	11.3	
Referendum	Philip Myers	1,042	2.8	
Socialist Labour	Michael Rix	656	1.8	
Socialist	Chris Hill	304	0.8	
Majority		20,689	55.9	
Turnout		37,009	54.7	
Labour hold		Swing		
