= 1929 Leeds South East by-election =

UK Parliamentary by-election

The 1929 Leeds South East by-election was held on 1 August 1929. The by-election was held due to the resignation of the incumbent Labour MP, Henry Slesser. It was won by the Labour candidate James Milner, who defeated his only opponent, Bill Brain of the Communist Party of Great Britain, in a landslide victory.

== Result ==
Leeds South East by-election, 1 August 1929
Party	Candidate	Votes	%	±%
Labour	James Milner	11,804	95.8	+20.6
Communist	Bill Brain	512	4.2	New
Majority		11,292	91.6	+41.2
Turnout		12,316	25.9	−36.7
Registered electors		47,573		
Labour hold				
