= 1940 Leeds North East by-election =

UK parliamentary by-election

The 1940 Leeds North East by-election was a parliamentary by-election in England held on 13 March 1940 to elect a new Member of Parliament (MP) for the UK House of Commons constituency of Leeds North East.

The vacancy was caused by the resignation on 8 February 1940 of the sitting Member, Sir John Birchall, through the procedural device of appointment as Steward of the Chiltern Hundreds. He had held the seat since its creation for the 1918 general election.

The by-election was held during World War II, and the five largest political parties – Conservative, Labour, Liberal, National Labour and National Liberal – were all members of the Coalition Government. As such, they maintained an electoral pact and agreed not to contest any by-elections in seats held by any other party in the Government.

The Conservative candidate, John Craik-Henderson, was opposed only by Sydney Allen of the British Union of Fascists. Henderson won with 97.1% of the vote, but gained only 37.5% and lost his seat in the 1945 general election, when the seat was also contested by Labour and Liberal Party candidates.

== Result ==
Leeds North East by-election, 1940
| Party | Candidate | Votes | % | ±% |
|---|---|---|---|---|
| Conservative | John Craik-Henderson | 23,882 | 97.1 | +32.3 |
| British Union of Fascists | Sydney Allen | 722 | 2.9 | New |
| Majority | | 23,160 | 94.1 | +64.5 |
| Turnout | | 24,604 | 34.9 | −31.2 |
| Conservative hold | | Swing | | |

== See also ==
- 1940 Middleton and Prestwich by-election
