= John Craik-Henderson =

Professor John James Craik-Henderson (21 December 1890 – 3 December 1971) was a British Conservative Party politician.

Henderson was elected to the House of Commons at a by-election in March 1940, as Member of Parliament (MP) for Leeds North East.

He served in Parliament for the rest of World War II, and was replaced by the 1945 general election by Alice Bacon of the Labour Party. He took 97.1% of the vote in 1940, opposed only by the British Union of Fascists, but took only 37.5% in 1945, when the seat was also contested by Labour and Liberal party candidates.

== Publications ==
- Dangers of a Supreme Parliament, in Lord Campion et al., Parliament: A Survey (London 1952)

Parliament of the United Kingdom
Preceded by John Dearman Birchall	Member of Parliament for Leeds North East; 1940 – 1945	Succeeded by Alice Bacon
