= Alice Bacon, Baroness Bacon =

English Labour Party politician (1909–1993)

The Right Honourable The Baroness Bacon CBE PC
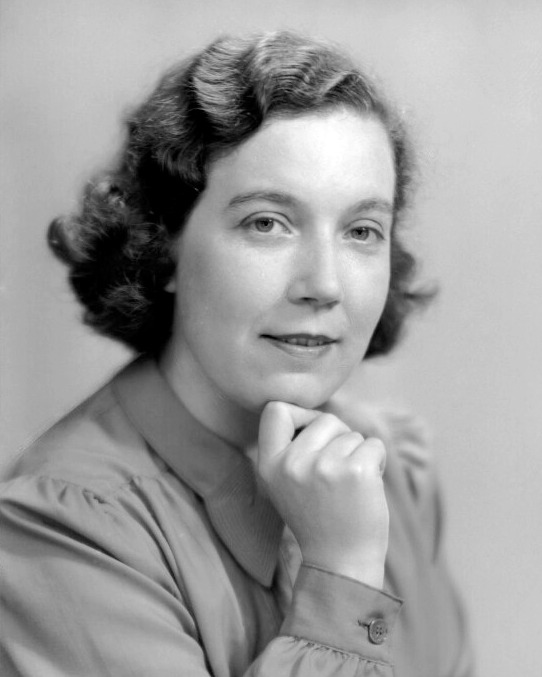
- Bacon in 1945

Chair of the Labour Party
- In office 1950–1951
- Prime Minister: Clement Attlee
- Preceded by: Sam Watson
- Succeeded by: Harry Earnshaw

Member of Parliament
- In office 26 May 1955 – 29 May 1970
- Preceded by: Denis Healey
- Succeeded by: Stan Cohen
- Constituency: Leeds South East
- In office 5 July 1945 – 6 May 1955
- Preceded by: John Craik-Henderson
- Succeeded by: Osbert Peake
- Constituency: Leeds North East

Personal details
- Born: Alice Martha Bacon; 10 September 1909 Normanton, West Riding of Yorkshire, England
- Died: 24 March 1993 (aged 83)
- Party: Labour
- Education: Stockwell Teachers' Training College

Alice Martha Bacon, Baroness Bacon, CBE, PC (10 September 1909 – 24 March 1993) was a British Labour Party politician. She served as a Member of Parliament from 1945 to 1970, was appointed to the Privy Council in 1966 and was Minister of State at the Department of Education and Science.

== Early life and education ==
Alice Martha Bacon was born on 10 September 1909 in Normanton, West Yorkshire.

Bacon's father was secretary of the Whitwood branch of the National Union of Mineworkers (NUM) and the family joined in local campaigns to alleviate poverty. She was educated at Normanton Girls' High School and Stockwell Teachers' Training College, before becoming a schoolteacher.

== Political career ==
At the age of 16, Bacon delivered her first political speech, and she joined the Labour Party around the same time. In 1935, she became as Labour's League of Youth delegate to the Socialist Youth International Conference. Bacon was active in the National Union of Teachers (NUT) and became president of its West Yorkshire division in 1944.

In 1938, Bacon was selected as the candidate for Leeds North East, for which she became the MP in the 1945 general election, as the city's first woman MP.

Bacon focused on pay and workplace conditions, education and housing in Parliament. She spoke of her hopes to "abolish poverty, but also the feeling of pauperism" in a speech on the 1947 National Assistance Bill. She was an early proponent of abolishing the death penalty and introduced a Bill in 1956 against capital punishment.

Bacon was on the Labour Party's National Executive Committee from 1941 until 1970, and chaired it in 1950–1951. In the 1953 Coronation Honours she was appointed a CBE.

When constituency boundaries were revised for the 1955 general election, Bacon transferred from Leeds North East to Leeds South East constituency and served it as MP until she retired in 1970.

When Labour returned to government under Harold Wilson's leadership in 1964, Bacon became a Minister of State at the Home Office up to 1967, serving under Frank Soskice and Roy Jenkins in a period of liberalising reforms. Bacon was appointed to the Privy Council in 1966. From 1967 to 1970 she was Minister of State at the Department of Education and Science, where she campaigned for comprehensive education.

On her retirement from the House of Commons, Bacon was created on 14 October 1970 Baroness Bacon of the City of Leeds and of Normanton in the West Riding of Yorkshire.

Bacon died on 24 March 1993, aged 83.

== Remembrances ==
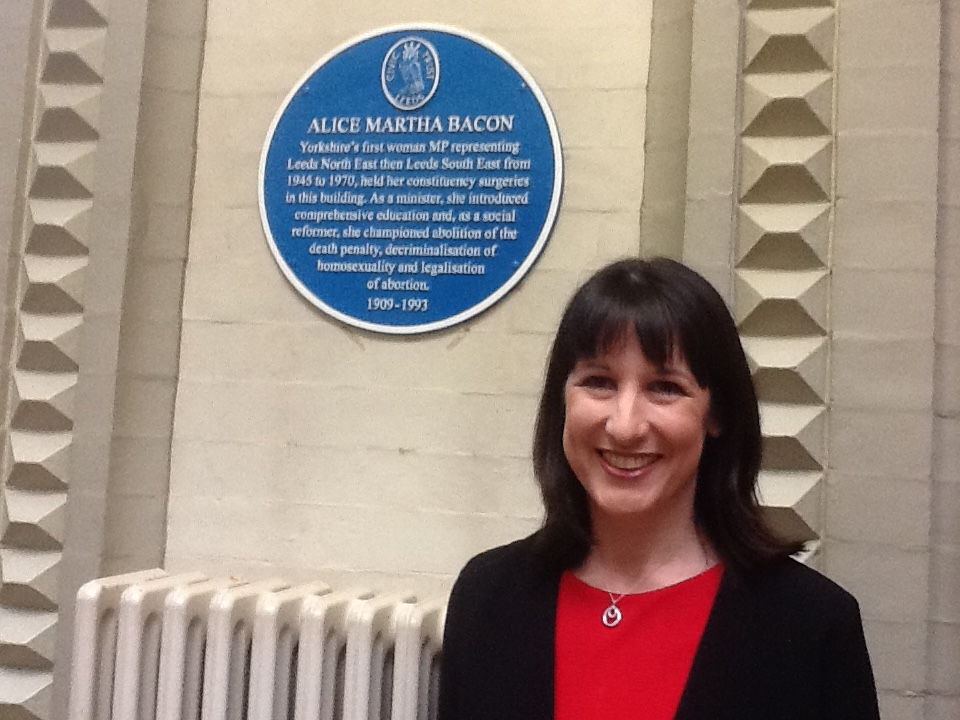
Leeds Civic Trust Blue Plaque for Alice Bacon at Leeds Corn Exchange, unveiled by her biographer Rachel Reeves MP (right)

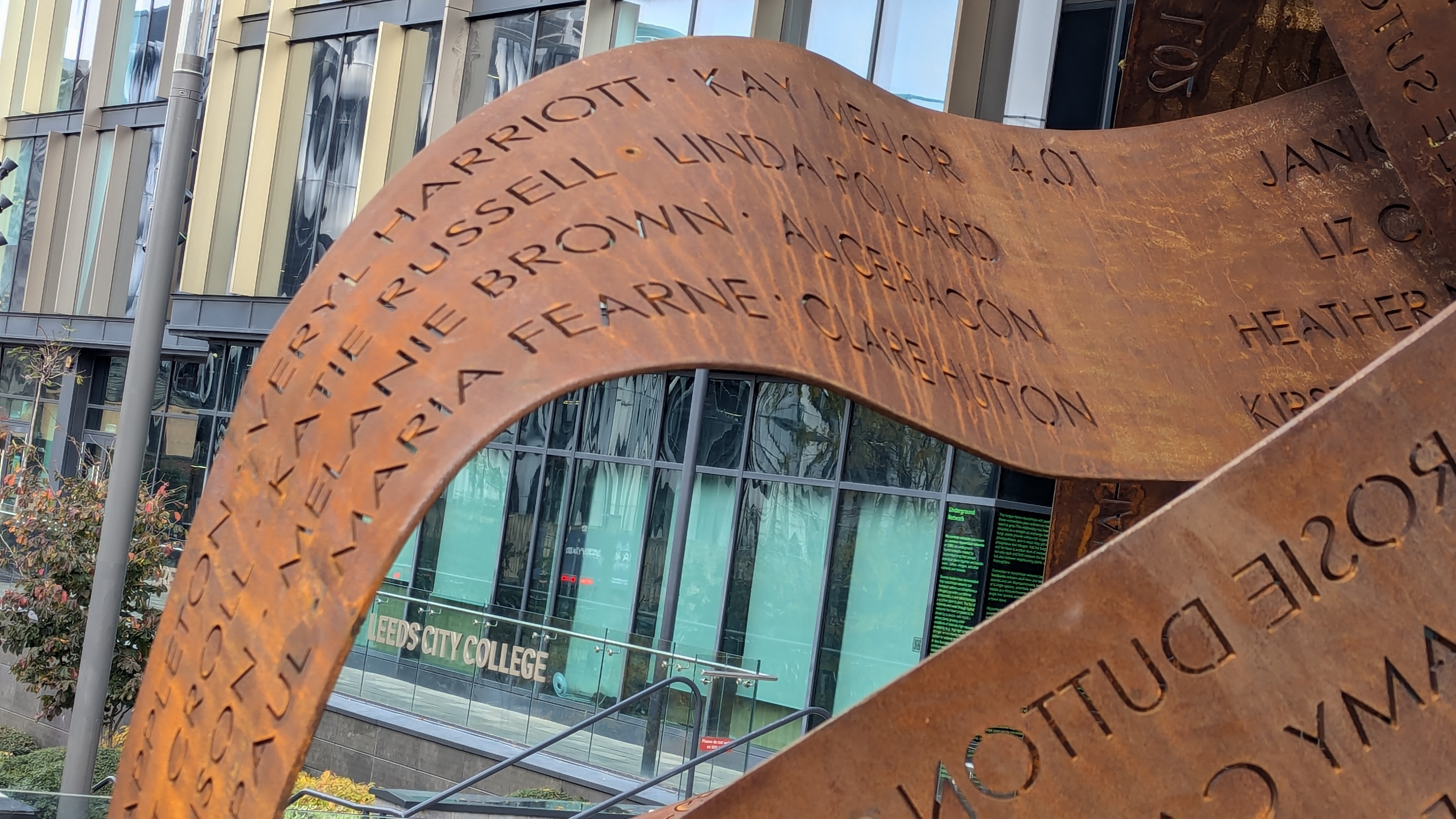
Segment of Ribbons sculpture, featuring names of Maria Fearne, Alice Bacon, Mel B and Kay Mellor

The Leeds West MP Rachel Reeves published Alice in Westminster: The Political Life of Alice Bacon in 2019 (I.B. Tauris). Reeves writes of Bacon that she "was a pioneer in the world of education and politics whose success was founded on her determination to stay true to her working-class roots and the people she came into politics to serve", and that her commitment to comprehensive education was especially praiseworthy.

Since 2018 the University of Leeds holds an annual Alice Bacon Lecture to celebrate pioneering and strong women. These have been given by Harriet Harman (2018), Baroness Hale of Richmond (2019), (2020 not given due to the COVID-19 pandemic), Baroness Doreen Lawrence (2021), Mary Beard (2022), Dame Sharon White (2023). The lecture was set up and hosted by a collaboration of Rachel Reeves and the University's Centre for Democratic Politics (previously School of Politics and International Studies).

In 2018, the 4.3% pale ale "Baroness Bacon Beer" was served on tap at Strangers' Bar in the Palace of Westminster for a week.

Bacon's name is one of those featured on the sculpture Ribbons, unveiled in 2024.

Parliament of the United Kingdom
Preceded by John Craik-Henderson	Member of Parliament for Leeds North East; 1945–1955	Succeeded by Osbert Peake
Preceded by Denis Healey	Member of Parliament for Leeds South East; 1955–1970	Succeeded by Stan Cohen
Party political offices
Preceded by Sam Watson	Chair of the Labour Party; 1950–1951	Succeeded by Harry Earnshaw
