= 1956 Leeds North East by-election =

UK parliamentary by-election

The 1956 Leeds North East by-election of 9 February 1956 was a by-election to the UK House of Commons. It was caused when the sitting Member, Osbert Peake, was awarded a Viscountcy in the New Year's Honours list (he took the title Viscount Ingleby). Sir Keith Joseph kept the seat for the Conservative Party with a slightly reduced numerical majority, but increased in percentage terms.

== Candidates ==
The Conservative Party's choice of Sir Keith Joseph reflected his strong performance at the 1955 general election when he had failed to be elected, but only by 125 votes, in the London constituency of Barons Court. Joseph was then a 37-year-old director of building and civil engineering companies and non-practising Barrister.

The Labour Party chose Harry Waterman, who had fought the constituency in the previous election. He was a 38-year-old local solicitor and a member of the Fabian Society. The election was a 'straight fight' with no Liberal or Independent candidate intervening.

== Result ==
Sir Keith Joseph won with a majority of 5,869 on a turnout substantially down on the general election. He achieved a slight swing towards his party compared to 1955. He held the seat until he retired in 1987.

Leeds North East by-election, 1956
Party	Candidate	Votes	%	±%
Conservative	Keith Joseph	14,081	63.2	+1.7
Labour	Harry Waterman	8,212	36.8	−1.7
Majority		5,869	26.4	+3.4
Turnout		22,293	39.9	−33.2
Conservative hold		Swing	+1.7	

== See also ==
- Leeds North East (UK Parliament constituency)
- List of United Kingdom by-elections (1950 - 1979)
