= Arthur Willey (solicitor) =

English solicitor, racehorse owner and MP

Arthur Wellesley Willey (1868 – 2 July 1923) was an English solicitor and racehorse owner, who was briefly the Conservative Member of Parliament (MP) for Leeds Central.

Willey was born in Leeds in 1868 and became one of the most successful solicitors in the West Riding of Yorkshire. He married Maud Evelyn Ellicott in 1894. He entered politics, serving on Leeds City Council.

He was elected MP for Leeds Central at 1922 general election, defeating the incumbent Liberal MP, Robert Armitage. While campaigning in his election he regularly tipped his audiences to bet on his horse "Leeds United" in an upcoming race; the horse won, at 5-1 odds, the day before the election. The tip was popular, and the Yorkshire Evening Post estimated that Leeds bookmakers had had to pay out around £20,000 in winnings.

Willey was not very active in Parliament owing to his commitments as a solicitor, although he intended to increase his Parliamentary work in the near future, and had taken a particular interest in the Criminal Justice Bill during his first session as an MP. He intended to make his maiden speech during the debate on the bill, but it was delayed.

On the morning of Sunday, 1 July 1923, Willey prepared to go to church with his wife Maud. It was the anniversary of the death of his son Tom, killed at the age of 18 at the Battle of the Somme exactly seven years previously.

Willey was taken by a sudden seizure, and never regained consciousness. He died early the following morning, aged 54.

That same day, a notice that Willey had already placed in The Times "In Memoriam" section appeared:

WILLEY – In proud and loving memory of SEC. LIEUT. TOM WILLEY, Leeds Pals Division, killed in the Somme attack on 1 July 1916. – MAUD AND ARTHUR WILLEY, "The Grove", Roundhay, Leeds.

At Willey's funeral, thousands of mourners lined the streets of Leeds, and a large number of public bodies and institutions were represented, together with representatives of the north country jockeys. At northern race meetings that day, jockeys wore crepe in memory of Willey.

All three of his children pre-deceased him and his wife died in December 1939.

== See also ==
- List of United Kingdom MPs with the shortest service

Parliament of the United Kingdom
Preceded by Robert Armitage	Member of Parliament for Leeds Central; 1922 – 1923	Succeeded by Sir Charles Henry Wilson
