= Richard Carr (historian) =

Richard Carr (born 23 February 1985) is a historian, political commentator and academic. He has been a lecturer in history at Anglia Ruskin University since 2013 having previously served as a Research Fellow and Senior Visiting Fellow at think tank Localis and as a lecturer at the University of East Anglia.

Carr has written or edited three books on modern British politics, namely those dealing with Conservative ex-servicemen after the First World War, the modern Conservative Party, and an analysis of One Nation politics both in historical and contemporary contexts.

He is also a regular political commentator, having written essays for Left Foot Forward, Labour List, Conservative Home, and Lib Dem Voice. In May 2015 he appeared on Radio 4's Today Programme discussing the impact social media had had on the 2015 General Election.

In 2012 he authored the report Credit Where Credit's Due for the think tank Localis backed by Robert Skidelsky and Jesse Norman, and he has lectured in support of One Nation politics. In 2014 he co-authored a series of essays on localism for the Fabian Society.

In 2015 he was a member of Anglia Ruskin University's Labour History department. He participated in the department's Research Unit's study of the popularity of Labour party policies, and has been frequently quoted in news reports about this and other aspects of department's research. In 2016 he was widely quoted in the national press claiming Labour leadership candidate Owen Smith was 'best placed to connect with the wider electorate' but that his rival Jeremy Corbyn would likely win the ongoing contest.

== Selected publications ==
=== Books ===
- Veteran MPs and Conservative politics in the aftermath of the Great War: The Memory of All That (Ashgate, 2013), PhD
- One Nation Britain: History, the Progressive Tradition, and Practical Ideas for Today's Politicians (Ashgate, 2014)
- The Global 1920s: Politics, Economics, and Society (with Bradley W. Hart, Routledge, 2016)

=== Edited volumes ===
- The Foundations of the British Conservative Party: Essays on Conservatism from Lord Salisbury to David Cameron. Bloomsbury Publishing. August 2013. ISBN 978-1-4411-5723-2. (co-editor with Bradley W. Hart, 1 August 2013)
