= Liz Davies =

British barrister, author and political activist

Liz Davies KC (born 1963) is a British barrister, author and political activist who advocates socialist feminism. She is the daughter of the Oxford academic and historian of Tudor England, C. S. L. Davies.

== Career ==
She studied at University College London, taking a sabbatical year working for the students' union as welfare secretary. Specialising in housing law, Davies initially worked as a solicitor before being called to the bar in 1994.

Davies is the co-author of Housing Allocation and Homelessness: Law and Practice. She was a finalist for the Legal Aid Barrister of the Year award in 2014.

== Politics ==
A former Labour Party councillor in Islington (1990–98), she was selected as the Labour Prospective Parliamentary Candidate for Leeds North-East in 1995, but was subsequently found "unsuitable" as a candidate by a large majority of the Labour Party's ruling National Executive Committee. Davies' selection was accompanied by allegations over her behaviour at Labour group meetings, for which Davies later commenced legal proceedings against three former Islington councillors, which ended in a settlement in which the three apologised and made a contribution to the general election fund of their local MP. She was also attacked for her association with the newspaper London Left Briefing; its connections to Trotskyist groups was used against Davies.

She was elected as a member of the NEC in October 1998 on the Grassroots Alliance slate, serving on the body for two years, an experience recounted in her book, Through the Looking Glass, published in 2001.

Later, after resigning from the Labour Party, she joined the Socialist Alliance in 2001, becoming the organisation's chair for nine months. She resigned from the SA in 2002 over claims of financial "bad practice" and frustration at the way the Socialist Workers Party's leadership had involved itself in the organisation's activities.

She was chair of the Haldane Society of Socialist Lawyers between 2006 and 2014 and is now Honorary Vice-President of the Society. As chair, she organised the Commission of Inquiry into Legal Aid, leading to the publication of Unequal Before the Law, and held an international conference "Defending Human Rights Defenders." She re-joined the Labour Party in 2015 and was secretary of Hackney North & Stoke Newington CLP between 2017–2018. She is now an active member of Southampton Test CLP. She has been a member of Unite the Union (formerly T&GWU) since 1989.

Liz Davies' partner was the American-born political activist and writer Mike Marqusee, who died in January 2015.
