= George Porter (British politician) =

George Porter (29 July 1884 – 25 September 1973) was a British Labour Party politician. He was the first Labour candidate to contest Liverpool Fairfield and was the first president of the Liverpool Fairfield Divisional Labour Party. He was first elected as Member of Parliament for Leeds Central at the 1945 general election, and re-elected in 1950 and 1951. He did not stand in the 1955 general election, when his constituency was abolished.

Prior to his election, Porter had worked as a joiner and builder and as labour supply inspector. He was also President of Liverpool Trades Council, a councillor in Huyton and a justice of the peace. In parliament he was particularly interesting in questions relating to housing and labour, and was a member of parliamentary groups on housing and town planning.

Porter had three children. He was a member of the Amalgamated Society of Woodworkers and Manchester Unity of Odd Fellows.

Parliament of the United Kingdom
Preceded by Richard Denman	Member of Parliament for Leeds Central; 1945–1955	Constituency abolished
