= Henry Slesser =

English barrister and British Labour Party politician

Slesser in 1924

Sir Herman Henry Slesser PC (born Schloesser; 12 July 1883 – 3 December 1979) was an English barrister and Labour Party politician who served as Solicitor-General and Lord Justice of Appeal.

He was born in London, the son of a leather merchant and a concert pianist. He changed his name from Schloesser to Slesser in 1914, preferring the Anglicised form when Britain went to war with Germany.

In terms of his socio-economic and political viewpoints, Slesser gained notoriety for being one of the biggest advocates of distributist thought in government, opposing both unregulated capitalism and traditional socialism while arguing on behalf of a more mixed economy with capital spread more among ordinary men. His role helped push the Distributist League's interests until he left the House of Commons.

== Life ==
=== Background and early career ===
Born 12 July 1883 in London, England, he was the second son of Ernest Theodore Schloesser (Slesser) (1835–1929) a leather merchant from Frankfurt, and Anna Gella Seligmann, a concert pianist. After an apprenticeship in railway engineering, his health collapsed, and when he recovered he trained as a barrister. He taught labour law at the LSE Law School in the 1920s. He also joined the Fabian Society, and his legal and political careers became entwined; much of his casework involved defending workers, and in 1912 he was appointed standing counsel to the Labour Party.

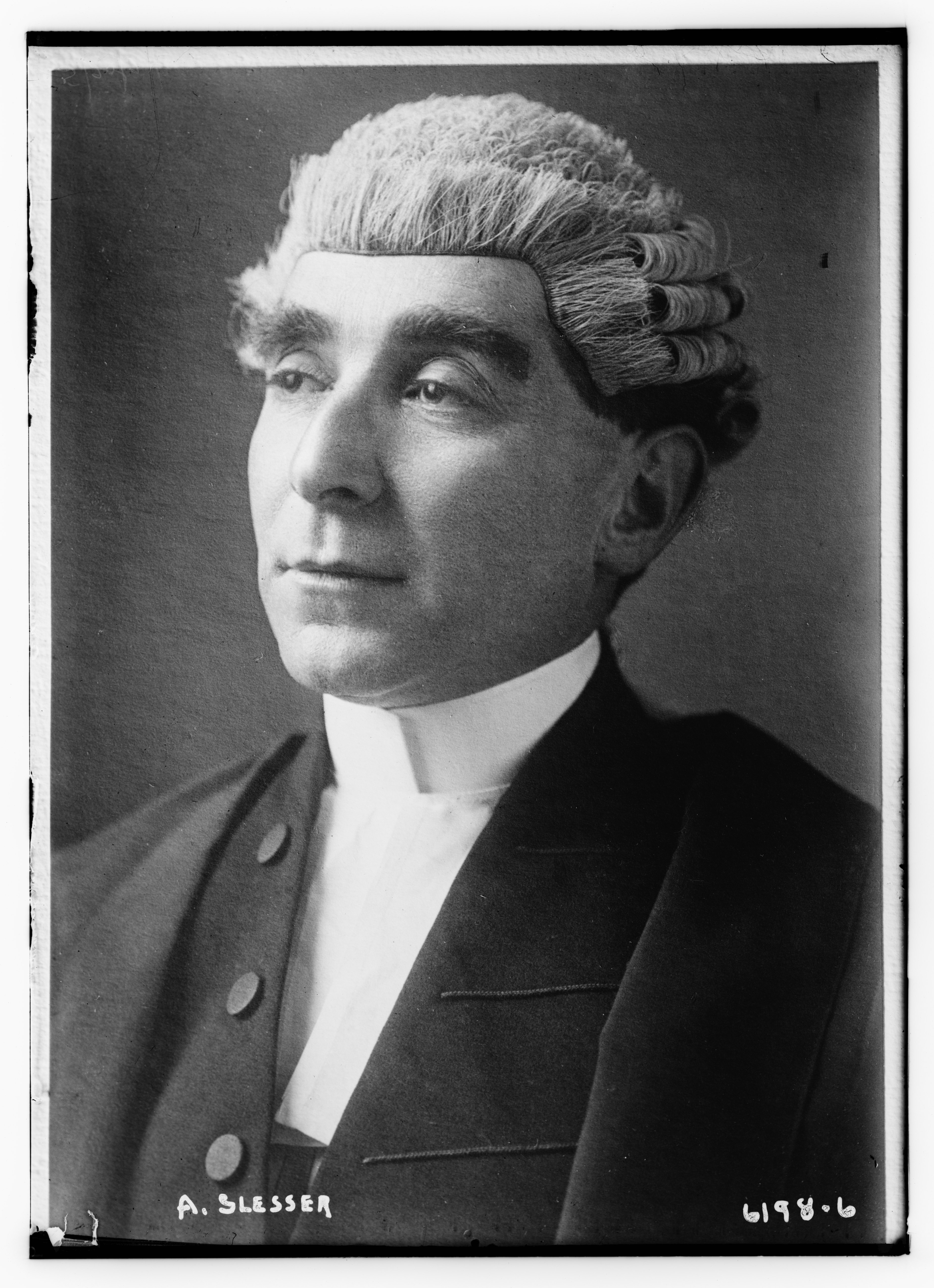
Slesser in 1900

He was adopted by the York Labour Representation Committee to run as their candidate at the general election expected to occur in either 1914 or 1915. The Fabian Society had agreed to finance his campaign. York was a two-member seat which had returned one Conservative and one Liberal MP in 1910. The Liberal and Labour parties had agreed to only put forward one candidate each, against two Conservatives, which would have given Schloesser a good chance of victory. However, due to the outbreak of war in Europe, the election did not take place.

He unsuccessfully contested the 1922 general election in Leeds Central, and was defeated again at a by-election in 1923 and at the December 1923 general election. He had grown wary of socialism, and based his campaigns on what he described as "medieval economics", principles drawn from his Anglo-Catholic religious faith; in his 1941 book Judgment Reserved, he attributed his defeat in 1922 to the "secularist and Hebrew" elements in the constituency disliking the presence of monks among his supporters. Baptised Anglican, he was formally received into the Roman Catholic Church in 1946.

=== Solicitor-General ===
When Ramsay MacDonald's First Labour Government took office in January 1924, Slesser was appointed as Solicitor-General. This was an unusual appointment, because the post had previously been offered only to Members of Parliament, and usually only to King's Counsel (Slesser's application had been rejected in 1922). Before his appointment on 24 January, he was made a KC and knighted.

The government fell in October 1924, and at the 1924 general election Slesser was elected as Member of Parliament (MP) for Leeds South East. He was re-elected at the 1929 general election, when MacDonald formed a Second Labour Government. The new Lord Chancellor offered Slesser a post as judge in the Appeals Court, which he accepted.

He retired as a judge in 1940, on grounds of ill-health, but lived on for nearly forty years. He was a county councillor in Devon from 1946 to 1968, and chair of the Dartmoor National Park Committee.

Slesser died on 3 December 1979, aged 96. His wife Margaret, whom he had married in 1910, had died earlier that year.

=== Viewpoints ===
His role helped push the Distributist League's interests until he left the British Parliament, the league having been founded by famous British writer G. K. Chesterton and promoting Chesterton's viewpoints. Slesser's advocacy for distributist thought in government meant being part of a movement working against both unregulated capitalism and traditional socialism, as stated before, while arguing on behalf of a more mixed economy. He was president of the Society for the Maintenance of the Faith, a Church of England patronage organisation.

== Sources ==
- Craig, F. W. S. (1983) [1969]. British parliamentary election results 1918-1949 (3rd ed.). Chichester: Parliamentary Research Services. ISBN 0-900178-06-X.
- Rubinstein, William D. (2011). The Palgrave Dictionary of Anglo-Jewish History. Palgrave Macmillan. ISBN 978-1-4039-3910-4.
- Leigh Rayment's Historical List of MPs

Parliament of the United Kingdom
Preceded by James O'Grady	Member of Parliament for Leeds South East; 1924–1929	Succeeded by James Milner
Political offices
Preceded by Thomas Inskip	Solicitor General for England and Wales; 1924	Succeeded by Thomas Inskip
Honorary titles
Preceded by The Duke of Gloucester	Senior Privy Counsellor; 1974–1979	Succeeded by Malcolm MacDonald
