= 1923 Leeds Central by-election =

Parliamentary by-election

← 1922	26 July 1923	1923 →

Candidate	Wilson	Slesser	Stone
Party	Unionist	Labour	Liberal
Popular vote	13,085	11,359	3,026
Percentage	47.6%	41.4%	11.0%
MP before election
Willey
Unionist
Subsequent MP
Wilson
Unionist

The 1923 Leeds Central by-election was a parliamentary by-election for the British House of Commons constituency of Leeds Central on 26 July 1923.

== Vacancy ==
The by-election was caused by the death of the sitting Unionist MP, Arthur Wellesley Willey on 2 July 1923. He had been MP here since winning the seat in 1922.

== Electoral history ==
Willey had gained the seat from the Liberals at the previous general election;

General election 1922: Leeds Central
Party	Candidate	Votes	%	±%
Unionist	Arthur Wellesley Willey	14,137	50.0	N/A
Labour	Henry Slesser	7,844	27.8	New
Liberal	Robert Armitage	6,260	22.2	−48.4
Majority		6,293	22.2	N/A
Turnout		28,241	66.1	+28.7
Unionist gain from Liberal		Swing		

== Result ==
The Unionists held the seat. The Liberal share was halved with the Labour Party picking up that former Liberal vote.

Leeds Central by-election, 1923
Party	Candidate	Votes	%	±%
Unionist	Charles Henry Wilson	13,085	47.6	−2.4
Labour	Henry Slesser	11,359	41.4	+13.6
Liberal	Gilbert Stone	3,026	11.0	−11.2
Majority		1,726	6.2	−16.0
Turnout		27,470	64.3	−1.8
Unionist hold		Swing	-8.0	

== Aftermath ==
The result at the following General election;

General election 1923: Leeds Central
Party	Candidate	Votes	%	±%
Unionist	Charles Henry Wilson	14,853	56.2	+6.2
Labour	Henry Slesser	11,574	43.8	+16.0
Majority		3,279	12.4	−9.8
Turnout		26,427	60.1	−6.0
Unionist hold		Swing	-4.9	
