= Leeds South East =

Parliamentary constituency in the United Kingdom, 1918–1983

- Former borough constituency for the House of Commons

1918–1983
- Seats: one
- Created from: Leeds East
- Replaced by: Leeds Central, Leeds East, Leeds West and Leeds North West

Leeds South East was a borough constituency in the city of Leeds in West Yorkshire. It returned one Member of Parliament (MP) to the House of Commons of the Parliament of the United Kingdom.

The constituency was created for the 1918 general election, and abolished for the 1983 general election.

== Boundaries ==
1918–1950: The County Borough of Leeds wards of East and East Hunslet, and part of North East ward.

1950–1951: The County Borough of Leeds wards of Crossgates and Temple Newsam, East Hunslet, and Osmondthorpe.

1951–1955: The County Borough of Leeds wards of Cross Gates, East Hunslet, Halton, and Osmondthorpe.

1955–1974: The County Borough of Leeds wards of Blenheim, City, East Hunslet, Richmond Hill, and Westfield.

1974–1983: The County Borough of Leeds wards of Burley, Burmantofts, City, Richmond Hill, and Woodhouse.

Leeds city centre was in the constituency from 1955 until the seat disappeared in 1983 since when it has been in Leeds Central.

== Members of Parliament ==
Election	Member	Party
1918	James O'Grady	Labour
1924	Henry Slesser	Labour
1929	James Milner	Labour
1952	Denis Healey	Labour
1955	Alice Bacon	Labour
1970	Stan Cohen	Labour
1983	constituency abolished	

== Election results ==
=== Elections in the 1910s ===
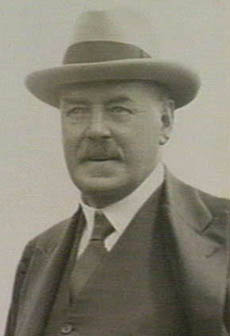
James O'Grady

General election 1918: Leeds South East
Party	Candidate	Votes	%	±%
Labour	James O'Grady	Unopposed		
Labour win (new seat)				

=== Elections in the 1920s ===
Mary Grant

General election 1922: Leeds South East
Party	Candidate	Votes	%	±%
Labour	James O'Grady	13,676	58.9	N/A
Liberal	Mary Pollock Grant	9,554	41.1	New
Majority		4,122	17.8	N/A
Turnout		23,230	66.2	N/A
Registered electors		35,074		
Labour hold		Swing	N/A	

General election 1923: Leeds South East
Party	Candidate	Votes	%	±%
Labour	James O'Grady	12,210	63.2	+4.3
Liberal	William Tattersall Whiteley, 2nd Baron Marchamley	7,110	36.8	−4.3
Majority		5,100	26.4	+8.6
Turnout		19,320	54.1	−12.1
Registered electors		35,701		
Labour hold		Swing	+4.3	

General election 1924: Leeds South East
Party	Candidate	Votes	%	±%
Labour	Henry Slesser	15,133	58.6	−4.6
Liberal	William Tattersall Whiteley, 2nd Baron Marchamley	10,704	41.4	+4.6
Majority		4,429	17.2	−9.2
Turnout		25,837	71.8	+17.7
Registered electors		35,994		
Labour hold		Swing	−4.6	

General election 1929: Leeds South East
Party	Candidate	Votes	%	±%
Labour	Henry Slesser	22,403	75.2	+16.6
Unionist	John C Spurr	7,385	24.8	New
Majority		15,018	50.4	+33.2
Turnout		29,788	62.6	−9.2
Registered electors		47,573		
Labour hold		Swing	N/A	

By-election, 1929: Leeds South East
Party	Candidate	Votes	%	±%
Labour	James Milner	11,804	95.8	+20.6
Communist	W.T.E. Brain	512	4.2	New
Majority		11,292	91.6	+41.2
Turnout		12,316	25.9	−36.7
Registered electors		47,573		
Labour hold		Swing		

=== Elections in the 1930s ===
General election 1931: Leeds South East
Party	Candidate	Votes	%	±%
Labour	James Milner	17,845	52.56	
Conservative	Philip R Le Mesurier	16,109	47.44	
Majority		1,736	5.12	
Turnout		33,954	69.70	
Labour hold		Swing		

General election 1935: Leeds South East
Party	Candidate	Votes	%	±%
Labour	James Milner	19,552	65.73	
Conservative	Philip R Le Mesurier	10,192	34.27	
Majority		9,360	31.46	
Turnout		29,744	62.55	
Labour hold		Swing		

General Election 1939–40

Another General Election was required to take place before the end of 1940. The political parties had been making preparations for an election to take place and by the Autumn of 1939, the following candidates had been selected;

- Labour: James Milner
- Conservative:

=== Elections in the 1940s ===
General election 1945: Leeds South East
Party	Candidate	Votes	%	±%
Labour	James Milner	20,363	71.83	
Conservative	Sydney Beevers	4,518	15.94	
Liberal	Clifford Henry Tyers	3,466	12.23	New
Majority		15,845	55.89	
Turnout		28,347	71.63	
Labour hold		Swing		

=== Elections in the 1950s ===
General election 1950: Leeds South East
Party	Candidate	Votes	%	±%
Labour	James Milner	23,994	57.83	
Conservative	Charles Edward Kirwin	15,262	36.78	
Liberal	Albert Hope	2,234	5.38	
Majority		8,732	21.05	
Turnout		41,490	85.33	
Labour hold		Swing		

General election 1951: Leeds South East
Party	Candidate	Votes	%	±%
Labour	James Milner	24,929	60.50	
Conservative	Charles Edward Kirwin	16,277	39.50	
Majority		8,652	21.00	
Turnout		41,206	84.39	
Labour hold		Swing		

1952 Leeds South East by-election
Party	Candidate	Votes	%	±%
Labour	Denis Healey	17,194	63.24	+2.74
Conservative	Charles Edward Kirwin	9,995	36.76	−2.74
Majority		7,199	26.48	+5.48
Turnout		27,189	55.7	−28.7
Labour hold		Swing		

General election 1955: Leeds South East
Party	Candidate	Votes	%	±%
Labour	Alice Bacon	25,714	66.18	
Conservative	Wilson W.J. Dunn	13,142	33.82	
Majority		12,572	32.36	
Turnout		38,856	67.92	
Labour hold		Swing		

General election 1959: Leeds South East
Party	Candidate	Votes	%	±%
Labour	Alice Bacon	21,795	64.21	
Conservative	J Brian Womersley	12,146	35.79	
Majority		9,649	28.42	
Turnout		33,941	70.04	
Labour hold		Swing		

=== Elections in the 1960s ===
General election 1964: Leeds South East
Party	Candidate	Votes	%	±%
Labour	Alice Bacon	16,672	67.67	
Conservative	John E MacDonald	7,964	32.33	
Majority		8,708	35.34	
Turnout		24,636	73.92	
Labour hold		Swing		

General election 1966: Leeds South East
Party	Candidate	Votes	%	±%
Labour	Alice Bacon	14,663	71.86	
Conservative	JG Todd	5,743	28.14	
Majority		8,920	43.72	
Turnout		20,406	61.47	
Labour hold		Swing		

=== Elections in the 1970s ===
General election 1970: Leeds South East
Party	Candidate	Votes	%	±%
Labour	Stan Cohen	10,930	62.65	
Conservative	May Sexton	5,182	29.70	
Liberal	Anthony Britten	1,135	6.51	New
Communist	Bernard Scott	198	1.13	New
Majority		5,748	32.95	
Turnout		17,445	58.39	
Labour hold		Swing		

General election February 1974: Leeds South East
Party	Candidate	Votes	%	±%
Labour	Stan Cohen	17,827	53.08	
Conservative	May Sexton	8,373	24.93	
Liberal	Maggie Clay	6,981	20.79	
Communist	William Henry Innes	405	1.21	
Majority		9,454	28.15	
Turnout		33,586	67.85	
Labour hold		Swing		

General election October 1974: Leeds South East
Party	Candidate	Votes	%	±%
Labour	Stan Cohen	17,160	61.18	
Conservative	May Sexton	6,144	21.90	
Liberal	Maggie Clay	4,429	15.79	
Communist	William Henry Innes	317	1.13	
Majority		11,016	39.28	
Turnout		28,050	56.34	
Labour hold		Swing		

General election 1979: Leeds South East
Party	Candidate	Votes	%	±%
Labour	Stan Cohen	15,921	56.34	
Conservative	May Sexton	6,549	23.18	
Liberal	Maggie Clay	5,430	19.22	
Communist	JM Rodgers	190	0.67	
National Front	P Flint	168	0.59	New
Majority		9,372	33.16	
Turnout		28,258	65.00	
Labour hold		Swing		
