= Charles Wilson (Conservative politician) =

British politician (1859–1930)

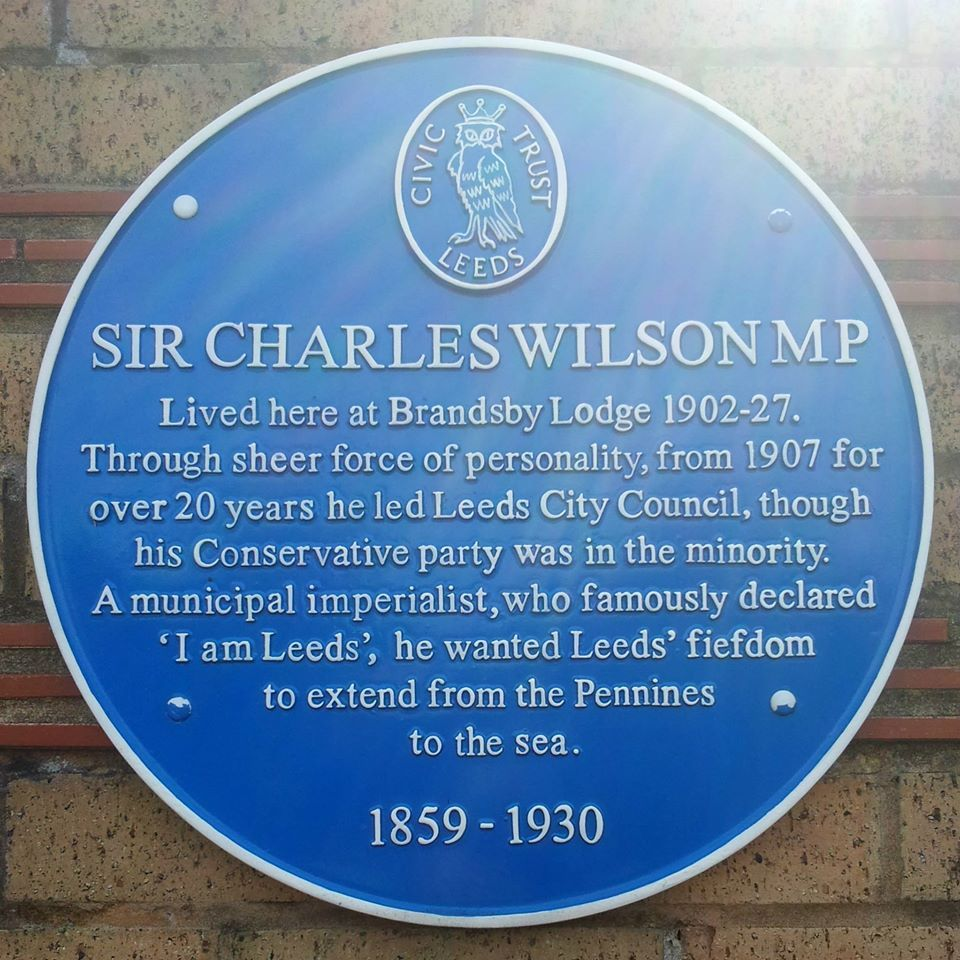

Sir Charles Henry Wilson (13 January 1859 – 30 December 1930) was a British Conservative Party politician. He was the member of parliament (MP) for Leeds Central, 26 July 1923 – 30 May 1929.

Wilson was a councillor and alderman on Leeds City Council from 1890 to 1928, and council leader for a period, and also an accountant, justice of the peace and freeman of the city.

Wilson was knighted in the 1923 Birthday Honours.

Parliament of the United Kingdom
Preceded by Arthur Wellesley Willey	Member of Parliament for Leeds Central; 1923–1929	Succeeded by Sir Richard Denman, 1st Baronet
