= Ealing North =

Parliamentary constituency in the United Kingdom, 1950 onwards

Coordinates: 51.537°N 0.345°W

- Borough constituency for the House of Commons
- Interactive map of boundaries from 2024
- Location within Greater London
- County: Greater London
- Electorate: 72,985 (March 2020)
- Major settlements: Greenford, Northolt and Perivale

Current constituency
- Created: 1950
- Member of Parliament: James Murray (Labour and Co-operative Party)
- Seats: One
- Created from: Ealing East and Ealing West

Ealing North is a constituency, (Note: A borough constituency (for the purposes of election expenses and type of returning officer)) created in 1950. Since the 2019 general election, it has been represented in the House of Commons of the UK Parliament by James Murray of Labour Co-op. (Note: As with all constituencies, the constituency elects one Member of Parliament (MP) by the first past the post system of election at least every five years.)

== Constituency profile ==
Ealing North is a suburban constituency located in the Borough of Ealing in London. It contains the towns of Greenford, Perivale and Northolt. The area was mostly rural until it was developed as a suburban residential area in the interwar period. The constituency has high levels of deprivation, particularly in Northolt, and is ethnically diverse. At the 2021 census, White British people were 23% of the population with White people in total making up 43%; there are significant Irish and Polish communities. Asians were 27%, Black people were 13% and other ethnic groups were 11%. House prices are lower than the London average.

Compared to the rest of London, residents of the constituency have lower levels of income, education and professional employment. At the local council, all wards in the constituency are represented by Labour Party councillors. An estimated 53% of voters in the constituency supported remaining in the European Union in the 2016 referendum, higher than the nationwide rate but lower than the rest of London.

== History ==
From the February 1974 to 2005 general elections inclusive, it was a Labour-Conservative marginal, being won by the party forming the government, and thus a bellwether. Since 1997, is on the length of tenure measure (but not necessarily extent of majority) a "safe" Labour seat. The party's newly selected candidate for MP in 2019 came 12,269 votes ahead of the Conservative candidate, a majority of almost 25% of the votes cast.

== Boundaries ==
=== Historic ===
Map that gives each named seat and any constant electoral success for national (Westminster) elections for Middlesex, 1955 to 1974.

1950–1974: The Municipal Borough of Ealing wards of Greenford Central, Greenford North, Greenford South, Hanger Hill, Northolt, and Perivale.

1974–1983: The London Borough of Ealing wards of Brent, Cleveland, Horsenden, Mandeville, Perivale, Ravenor, and West End.

1983–1997: The London Borough of Ealing wards of Argyle, Costons, Hobbayne, Mandeville, Perivale, Ravenor, West End, and Wood End.

1997–2010: The London Borough of Ealing wards of Argyle, Costons, Hanger Hill, Hobbayne, Horsenden, Mandeville, Perivale, Pitshanger, Ravenor, West End, and Wood End.

2010–2024: The London Borough of Ealing wards of Cleveland, Greenford Broadway, Greenford Green, Hobbayne, North Greenford, Northolt Mandeville, Northolt West End, and Perivale.

For the 2010 general election, under the national Fifth Periodic Review of Westminster constituencies, the Boundary Commission for England made minor changes to Ealing North. Part of Greenford Broadway ward, along with tiny parts of Hobbayne; and Dormers Wells wards were transferred to Ealing Southall. Tiny parts of the latter two wards were exchanged in return. Parts of Ealing Broadway and Hanger Hill wards were moved to the new Ealing Central and Acton so the latter came into existence to avoid its forerunner's mention of Shepherd Bush and avoid its containing much of that part of the London Borough of Hammersmith and Fulham.

=== Current ===
Further to the 2023 review of Westminster constituencies, which came into effect for the 2024 general election, the constituency is composed of:

- The London Borough of Ealing wards of Central Greenford, Greenford Broadway, North Greenford, North Hanwell, Northolt Mandeville, Northolt West End, Perivale, and Pitshanger.

Minor loss to align boundaries with those of new local authority wards which came into effect in May 2022.

== Members of Parliament ==
Election	Member	Party
1950	James Hudson	Labour Co-op
1955	John Barter	Conservative
1964	William Molloy	Labour
1979	Harry Greenway	Conservative
1997	Stephen Pound	Labour
2019	James Murray	Labour Co-op

== Election results ==
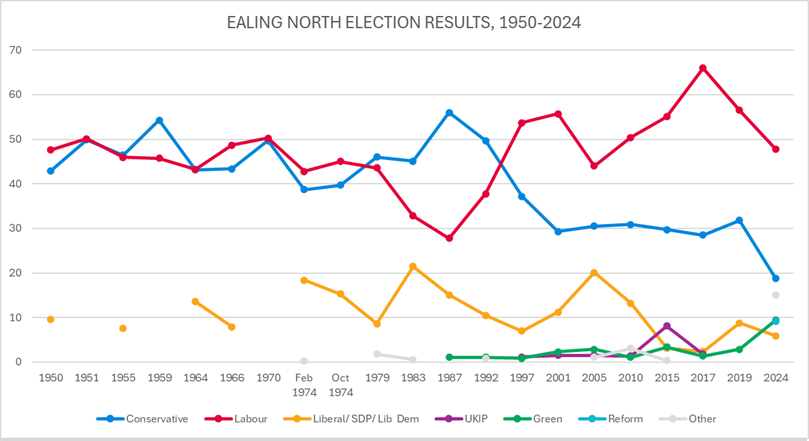
Election results 1950-2024

=== Elections in the 2020s ===
General election 2024: Ealing North
Party	Candidate	Votes	%	±%
Labour Co-op	James Murray	20,663	47.8	–8.5
Conservative	Maria Khan	8,144	18.8	–13.1
Green	Natalia Kubica	4,056	9.4	+6.4
Reform	Leon Harris	3,948	9.1	N/A
Workers Party	Sameh Habeeb	3,139	7.3	N/A
Liberal Democrats	Craig O'Donnell	2,543	5.9	–3.0
Independent	Helmi Alharahsheh	499	1.2	N/A
SDP	Leslie Beaumont	240	0.6	N/A
Majority		12,489	29.0	+4.5
Turnout		43,232	57.8	–9.0
Registered electors		74,820		
Labour Co-op hold		Swing	+2.3	

=== Elections in the 2010s ===
2019 notional result
Party	Vote	%
Labour	27,463	56.3
Conservative	15,555	31.9
Liberal Democrats	4,311	8.8
Green	1,435	2.9
Turnout	48,764	66.8
Electorate	72,985	

General election 2019: Ealing North
Party	Candidate	Votes	%	±%
Labour Co-op	James Murray	28,036	56.5	−9.5
Conservative	Anthony Pickles	15,767	31.8	+3.3
Liberal Democrats	Henrietta Bewley	4,370	8.8	+6.4
Green	Jeremy Parker	1,458	2.9	+1.5
Majority		12,269	24.7	−12.8
Turnout		49,631	66.6	−3.6
Registered electors		74,473		
Labour Co-op hold		Swing	–6.4	

General election 2017: Ealing North
Party	Candidate	Votes	%	±%
Labour	Stephen Pound	34,635	66.0	+10.8
Conservative	Isobel Grant	14,942	28.5	−1.3
Liberal Democrats	Humaira Sanders	1,275	2.4	−0.8
UKIP	Peter Mcilvenna	921	1.8	−6.3
Green	Meena Hans	743	1.4	−2.0
Majority		19,693	37.5	+12.1
Turnout		52,516	70.2	+4.6
Registered electors		74,764		
Labour hold		Swing	+6.0	

General election 2015: Ealing North
Party	Candidate	Votes	%	±%
Labour	Stephen Pound	26,745	55.1	+4.7
Conservative	Thomas O'Malley	14,419	29.7	–1.2
UKIP	Afzal Akram	3,922	8.1	+6.6
Green	Meena Hans	1,635	3.4	+2.3
Liberal Democrats	Kevin McNamara	1,575	3.2	−9.9
TUSC	David Hofman	214	0.4	New
Majority		12,326	25.4	+5.9
Turnout		48,510	65.7	+0.4
Registered electors		73,881		
Labour hold		Swing	+3.0	

General election 2010: Ealing North
Party	Candidate	Votes	%	±%
Labour	Stephen Pound	24,023	50.3	+3.5
Conservative	Ian Gibb	14,772	31.0	+2.1
Liberal Democrats	Chris Lucas	6,283	13.2	−6.3
BNP	Dave Furness	1,045	2.2	New
UKIP	Ian De Wulverton	685	1.4	+0.1
Green	Christopher Warleigh-Lack	505	1.1	−1.5
Christian	Petar Ljubisic	415	0.9	New
Majority		9,301	19.4	+1.4
Turnout		47,678	65.2	+5.9
Rejected ballots		288	0.6	
Total ballots		47,966	65.6	
Registered electors		73,104		
Labour hold		Swing	+0.7	

=== Elections in the 2000s ===
2005 notional result
Party	Vote	%
Labour	20,175	46.8
Conservative	12,430	28.8
Liberal Democrats	8,401	19.5
Others	2,095	4.9
Turnout	43,101	59.3
Electorate	72,680	

General election 2005: Ealing North
Party	Candidate	Votes	%	±%
Labour	Stephen Pound	20,956	45.1	−10.6
Conservative	Roger C. Curtis	13,897	29.9	+0.6
Liberal Democrats	Francesco R. Fruzza	9,148	19.7	+8.5
Green	Alan G. Outten	1,319	2.8	+0.5
UKIP	Robin A.D. Lambert	692	1.5	+0.0
Veritas	David Malindine	495	1.1	New
Majority		6,159	15.2	−11.2
Turnout		46,607	59.8	+1.8
Registered electors		77,787		
Labour hold		Swing	−5.6	

General election 2001: Ealing North
Party	Candidate	Votes	%	±%
Labour	Stephen Pound	25,022	55.7	+2.0
Conservative	Charles Walker	13,185	29.3	−7.9
Liberal Democrats	Francesco R. Fruzza	5,043	11.2	+4.2
Green	Astra Seibe	1,039	2.3	+1.4
UKIP	Daniel Moss	668	1.5	+0.2
Majority		11,837	26.3	+9.9
Turnout		44,957	58.0	−13.3
Registered electors		77,524		
Labour hold		Swing	+4.9	

=== Elections in the 1990s ===
General election 1997: Ealing North
Party	Candidate	Votes	%	±%
Labour	Stephen Pound	29,904	53.7	+17.9
Conservative	Harry Greenway	20,744	37.2	−14.2
Liberal Democrats	Anjam K. Gupta	3,887	7.0	−3.8
UKIP	G. M. Slysz	689	1.2	New
Green	Astra Seibe	502	0.9	−0.2
Majority		9,160	16.4	N/A
Turnout		55,726	71.3	−5.4
Registered electors		78,144		
Labour gain from Conservative		Swing	+16.0	

1992 notional result
Party	Vote	%
Conservative	29,917	51.4
Labour	20,842	35.8
Liberal Democrats	6,266	10.8
Others	1,175	2.0
Turnout	58,200	76.7
Electorate	75,908	

General election 1992: Ealing North
Party	Candidate	Votes	%	±%
Conservative	Harry Greenway	24,898	49.7	−6.3
Labour Co-op	Martin J. Stears	18,932	37.8	+10.0
Liberal Democrats	Peter C. D. Hankinson	5,247	10.5	−4.7
Green	Douglas S. Earl	554	1.1	+0.0
National Front	Christopher J. G. Hill	277	0.6	New
Christian Democrat	Randall A. Davis	180	0.4	New
Majority		5,966	11.9	−16.3
Turnout		50,088	78.8	+3.8
Registered electors		63,528		
Conservative hold		Swing	–8.1	

=== Elections in the 1980s ===
General election 1987: Ealing North
Party	Candidate	Votes	%	±%
Conservative	Harry Greenway	30,100	56.0	+10.9
Labour	Hilary Benn	14,947	27.8	−5.0
Liberal	Anthony Miller	8,149	15.2	−6.3
Green	Katrin Fitzherbert	577	1.1	New
Majority		15,153	28.2	+15.9
Turnout		53,773	75.1	+0.2
Registered electors		71,634		
Conservative hold		Swing	+8.0	

General election 1983: Ealing North
Party	Candidate	Votes	%	±%
Conservative	Harry Greenway	23,128	45.1	+1.4
Labour	Hilary Benn	16,837	32.8	−13.6
Liberal	Anthony Miller	11,021	21.5	+13.3
BNP	James Shaw	306	0.6	–1.2
Majority		6,291	12.3	N/A
Turnout		51,298	74.8	
Registered electors		68,538		
Conservative gain from Labour (Notional.)		Swing	+7.5	

1979 notional result
Party	Vote	%
Labour	24,220	46.4
Conservative	22,799	43.7
Liberal	4,259	8.2
Others	915	1.8
Turnout	52,193	
Electorate		

=== Elections in the 1970s ===
General election 1979: Ealing North
Party	Candidate	Votes	%	±%
Conservative	Harry Greenway	27,524	46.0	+6.4
Labour	William Molloy	26,044	43.6	−1.5
Liberal	Jack Taylor	5,162	8.6	−6.7
National Front	James Shaw	1,047	1.8	New
Majority		1,480	2.5	N/A
Turnout		59,777	77.8	+4.0
Registered electors		76,805		
Conservative gain from Labour		Swing	+3.9	

General election October 1974: Ealing North
Party	Candidate	Votes	%	±%
Labour	William Molloy	24,574	45.0	+2.2
Conservative	Geoffrey Dickens	21,652	39.7	+1.0
Liberal	Clive Philips	8,351	15.3	−3.1
Majority		2,922	5.4	+1.2
Turnout		54,577	73.9	−7.1
Registered electors		73,898		
Labour hold		Swing	+0.6	

General election February 1974: Ealing North
Party	Candidate	Votes	%	±%
Labour	William Molloy	25,387	42.8	−5.8
Conservative	M.J.L. Patterson	22,939	38.7	−12.8
Liberal	Clive Philips	10,922	18.4	New
Independent	P. Smith	93	0.2	New
Majority		2,448	4.1	+3.4
Turnout		59,341	80.9	+10.7
Registered electors		73,327		
Labour gain from Conservative (Notional.)		Swing	+3.5	

1970 notional result
Party	Vote	%
Conservative	28,100	51.5
Labour	26,500	48.5
Turnout	54,600	70.3
Electorate	77,721	

General election 1970: Ealing North
Party	Candidate	Votes	%	±%
Labour	William Molloy	23,459	50.3	+1.7
Conservative	John Barter	23,139	49.7	+6.3
Majority		320	0.7	−4.6
Turnout		46,598	72.6	−9.5
Registered electors		64,159		
Labour hold		Swing	–2.3	

=== Elections in the 1960s ===
General election 1966: Ealing North
Party	Candidate	Votes	%	±%
Labour	William Molloy	23,730	48.7	+5.4
Conservative	John Barter	21,153	43.4	+0.2
Liberal	John E. Elsom	3,858	7.9	−5.7
Majority		2,577	5.3	+5.12
Turnout		48,741	82.2	+1.1
Registered electors		59,315		
Labour hold		Swing	+2.6	

General election 1964: Ealing North
Party	Candidate	Votes	%	±%
Labour	William Molloy	20,809	43.2	−11.2
Conservative	John Barter	20,782	43.2	−2.5
Liberal	Derek F.J. Wood	6,532	13.6	New
Majority		27	0.1	N/A
Turnout		48,123	81.1	−3.1
Registered electors		59,321		
Labour gain from Conservative		Swing	+4.3	

=== Elections in the 1950s ===
General election 1959: Ealing North
Party	Candidate	Votes	%	±%
Conservative	John Barter	27,312	54.2	+7.8
Labour Co-op	William Hilton	23,036	45.8	−0.2
Majority		4,276	8.5	+8.0
Turnout		50,348	84.2	−0.9
Registered electors		59,768		
Conservative hold		Swing	+4.0	

General election 1955: Ealing North
Party	Candidate	Votes	%	±%
Conservative	John Barter	23,040	46.4	−3.4
Labour Co-op	James Hudson	22,794	46.0	−4.2
Liberal	Arnold E. Bender	3,770	7.6	New
Majority		246	0.5	N/A
Turnout		49,604	85.2	−2.6
Registered electors		58,245		
Conservative gain from Labour Co-op		Swing	+0.4	

General election 1951: Ealing North
Party	Candidate	Votes	%	±%
Labour Co-op	James Hudson	25,698	50.1	+2.5
Conservative	Airey Neave	25,578	49.9	+7.0
Majority		120	0.2	−4.5
Turnout		51,276	87.8	−0.2
Registered electors		58,401		
Labour Co-op hold		Swing	–2.3	

General election 1950: Ealing North
Party	Candidate	Votes	%
Labour Co-op	James Hudson	24,157	47.6
Conservative	Elsie S. Olsen	21,753	42.9
Liberal	Edward Holloway	4,855	9.6
Majority		2,404	4.7
Turnout		50,765	88.0
Registered electors		57,671	
Labour Co-op win (new seat)			

== See also ==
- List of parliamentary constituencies in London
