= Stephen Pound =

British politician (born 1948)

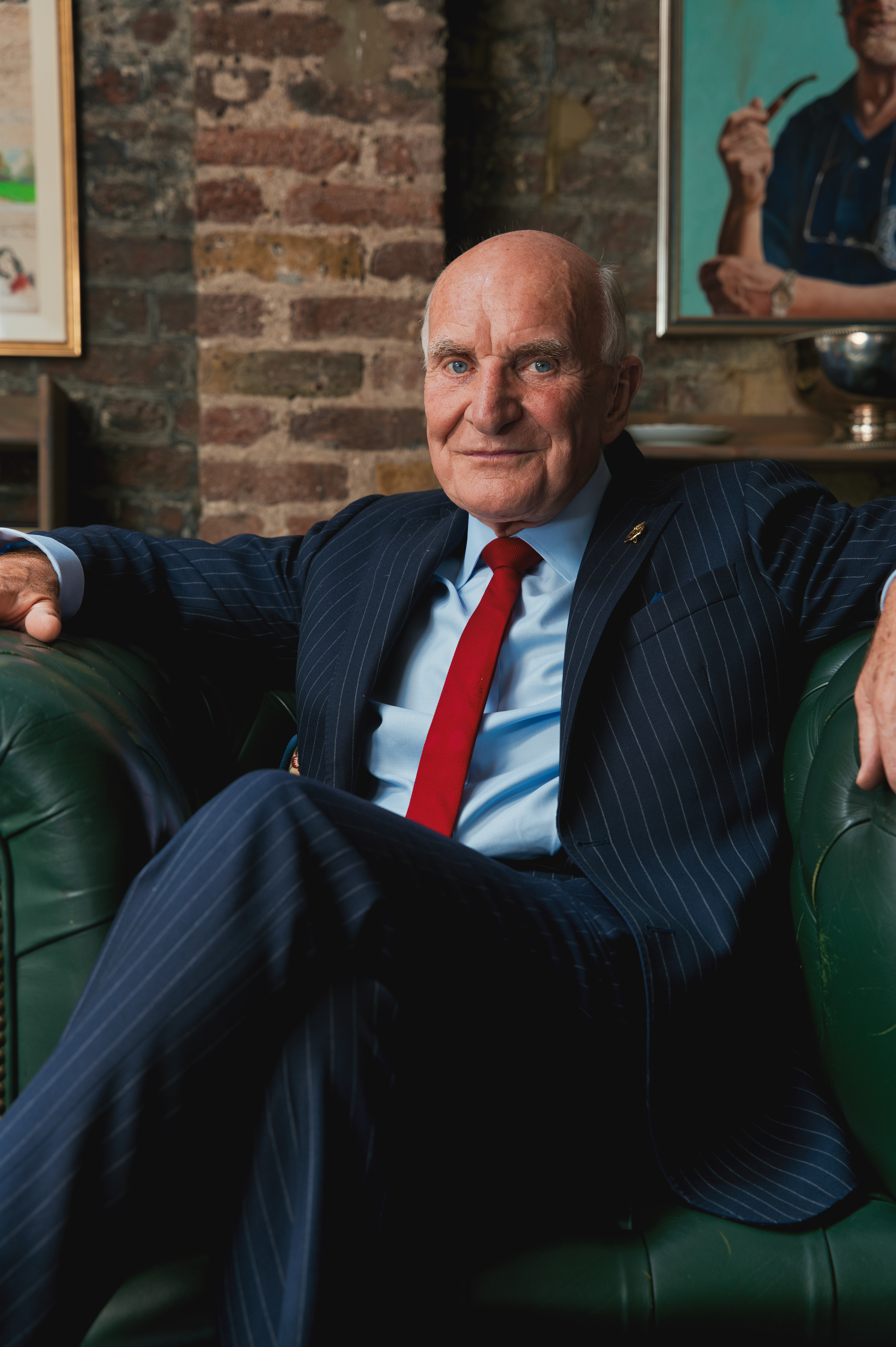
- Stephen Pound, London, 2026, by SonicShutter

Shadow Minister for Northern Ireland
- In office 20 November 2010 – 6 November 2019
- Leader: Ed Miliband; Harriet Harman (Acting); Jeremy Corbyn
- Preceded by: Eric Joyce
- Succeeded by: Karin Smyth

Member of Parliament for Ealing North
- In office 1 May 1997 – 6 November 2019
- Preceded by: Harry Greenway
- Succeeded by: James Murray

Personal details
- Born: Stephen Pelham Pound; 3 July 1948 (age 78) Hammersmith, London, England
- Party: Labour
- Spouse: Maggie Pound
- Children: 3
- Education: London School of Economics
- Profession: Politician
- Website: http://www.stevepound.org.uk/

Stephen Pelham Pound (born 3 July 1948) is a British former Labour Party politician who was the Member of Parliament (MP) for Ealing North from 1997 to 2019.

== Background ==
His father, Pelham Pendennis Pound (1922–1999) was a BBC sub-editor and former journalist (including for the News of the World and Daily Mirror) and literary agent whose clients included the osteopath Stephen Ward. When Ward was arrested for his role in the Profumo affair it was at Pound's home and Pound claims he had a minor role in the events leading to Ward's suicide. Pound's grandfather, Reginald Pound (1894–1991) F.R.S.L. was a journalist and biographer (including of Lord Northcliffe and A. P. Herbert), employed by, amongst others, the Daily Express and Strand Magazine (editor 1942–46).

Pound went to Hertford Grammar School (now called Richard Hale School) on Hale Road in Hertford. He was educated, as a mature student from 1979–84, at the London School of Economics where he gained a Diploma in Industrial Relations and a BSc in Economics. He was General Secretary of the student union from 1981–82.

He was a boxer in the Royal Navy when at sea from 1964–66, leading Private Eye magazine to refer to him as "Ealing North's tattooed bruiser". He also played cricket for Hanwell Cricket Club and worked as a bus conductor for London Transport, from 1966–68, and was a hospital porter from 1969–79. Prior to becoming an MP he worked for Paddington Churches Housing Association as a housing manager from 1984 until he became an MP. He was based at their office in Willesden.

== Political career ==
Pound served as a councillor in Ealing from 1982 to 1998. In 1982, he was elected in Elthorne ward, and in 1986 he was re-elected in his home ward of Hobbayne. He was the MP for Ealing North from 1997 to 2019.

He served as the Parliamentary Private Secretary (PPS) to Hazel Blears until he resigned in protest at the decision to replace Trident on 14 March 2007. He supported Blears in the 2007 Labour Party deputy leadership election.

Pound held the position of PPS to Minister Stephen Timms at the Department for Business, Enterprise and Regulatory Reform from October 2008 until May 2010. In April 2009 he was reported to have announced his resignation from this position, in order to vote against the government's policy of restricting the right of former Gurkhas to settle in the UK.

After the election of Ed Miliband as Labour leader in October 2010, he became an assistant whip. In November of that year he became shadow minister for Northern Ireland. He had served on the Northern Ireland Affairs Committee between 1997 and 2010.

In 2012, despite his republican views, Pound criticised protests arranged during Elizabeth II's Diamond Jubilee stating "You can hold republican views but you respect the current monarch – particularly in this year of all years. There is no need to lose your manners, and this is deliberately provocative."

In February 2013, Pound voted against the second reading of the Marriage (Same Sex Couples) Act 2013. Subsequently, in May 2013 the MP voted against the bill’s third and final reading, opposing the legalisation of same-sex marriage within England and Wales.

He supported Owen Smith in the failed attempt to replace Jeremy Corbyn in the 2016 Labour leadership election.

In 2019, Pound announced that he would not seek re-election at the next general election.

== Voting record ==
How Stephen Pound voted on key issues since 2001:

- Voted against introducing a smoking ban.
- Voted for introducing ID cards.
- Voted for introducing foundation hospitals.
- Voted for introducing student top-up fees.
- Voted for Labour's anti-terrorism laws.
- Voted for the Iraq War.
- Voted against investigating the Iraq War.
- Voted against replacing Trident missile system.
- Voted for the hunting ban.
- Voted against same-sex marriage.
- Voted for laws to stop climate change.

== MPs' expenses scandal ==
In May 2009 it was discovered Pound had claimed a mileage allowance of £4,251, equating to 11,004 miles (17,709 kilometres) of travel between his constituency and Parliament 11 miles (18 kilometres) away. He explained this by saying he made the trip "two or three times a day". He later said he had abandoned his ageing car altogether in favour of public transport.

== Media involvement ==
In 2003 BBC's Today asked its listeners to suggest a law that they would like to see put onto the statute books. The BBC received 10,000 nominations and five were short-listed, from which listeners then voted to select their preferred choice. Pound agreed to sponsor in Parliament whichever idea eventually won the final vote.

On 1 January 2004 it was announced on air that first place with 37 per cent of the vote had gone to the proposal to authorise homeowners to use any means to defend their home from intruders. (The controversial farmer Tony Martin was still very much in the news.) Pound's on-air reaction to the result was that, "The people have spoken—the bastards".

In May 2005, Pound appeared on British TV quiz show Have I Got News For You and in December of that year in a special edition of University Challenge.

In April 2015, a video circulated on social media where Pound asked Cameron whether he was willing to disassociate himself from the "snobbish and disdainful" bingo and beer advertisement tweeted by the Conservative Party chairman Grant Shapps. The Prime Minister thanked him for advertising the Conservative's strong economic policy, and ended his reply concerning Pound by saying: "I am sure that the honourable gentleman enjoys a game of bingo – it's the only time he'll ever get close to Number 10". After going viral it picked up more than 3.6 million views in less than 24 hours.

== Personal life ==
He married Maggie in 1976. They have a son and daughter. He is a Roman Catholic. In 2004, he discovered that he had fathered a daughter when he was eighteen years old; this information was revealed to the public in January 2005. Pound is a Fulham FC fan, and also the Patron of Hanwell Town FC.

Pound was made Vice-President of the Catholic Union of Great Britain in February 2024.

Parliament of the United Kingdom
Preceded by Harry Greenway	Member of Parliament for Ealing North; 1997–2019	Succeeded by James Murray
