= William Molloy, Baron Molloy =

British politician (1918–2001)

The Right Honourable The Lord Molloy

Member of the House of Lords
- Lord Temporal
- Life peerage 12 May 1981 – 26 May 2001

Personal details
- Born: 26 October 1918
- Died: 26 May 2001 (aged 82)

William John Molloy, Baron Molloy (26 October 1918 – 26 May 2001) was a British Labour Party politician.

== Early life ==
Molloy was born in Swansea in 1918, and educated at St Thomas Primary School and University College, Swansea.

== Career ==
In World War II, Molloy served in the Royal Engineers and in 1945 joined the Foreign Office, where he became a senior staff representative on the Whitley Council. He left the civil service to pursue a political career in the Labour Party. He became a councillor in Fulham in 1954, before becoming selected as parliamentary candidate for Ealing North in 1962.

He was elected as Member of Parliament for Ealing North from 1964 until the 1979 general election, when he lost the seat to the Conservative Harry Greenway. Molloy was also a Member of the European Parliament from 1976 to 1977, supporting the "Get Britain Out" (of the European Economic Community) campaign. After the loss of his seat in 1979, he was created a life peer on 12 May 1981, taking the title Baron Molloy, of Ealing in Greater London.

Baron Molloy was a member of the Sylvan Debating Club.

== Personal life ==
Molloy was married twice: firstly, in 1942, to Eva Lewis: they had a daughter, Marion, who married Laurence Motl (1927-2019) of St Paul, Minnesota. After Eva's death, Molloy married Doris Paines in 1981 (div.1987).

Coat of arms of William Molloy, Baron Molloy

Crest
Upon rocks thereon oyster shells Proper a representation of the Mumbles Lighthouse at Swansea diffusing light from its lantern all Proper.
Escutcheon
Vert on a rounded mount Or an oak tree Proper leaved and fructed also Or and in base two barrulets wavy Argent all within a bordure Ermine.
Supporters
Dexter on a grassy mount Proper a dragon passant its tail looped Gules tongue and claws Or; sinister on a like mount a swan wings displayed inverted and addorsed all Proper.
Motto
Justice And Compassion

Parliament of the United Kingdom
Preceded by John Barter	Member of Parliament for Ealing North; 1964–1979	Succeeded by Harry Greenway
