= Committee on the Future Relationship with the European Union =

Former select committee of the British House of Commons

The Committee on the Future Relationship with the European Union, commonly known as the Brexit Select Committee and formerly the Exiting the European Union Select Committee, was a select committee of the British House of Commons that examines matters relating to the United Kingdom's relationship with the European Union after Brexit. Until the department's closure on 31 January 2020, the committee scrutinised the work of the Department for Exiting the European Union, which had been launched by Prime Minister Theresa May in July 2016 following the 'Leave' vote in the UK's referendum on membership of the European Union. It was dissolved on 16 January 2021 in line with the temporary standing order which formed the committee.

== History ==
In November 2017 Parliament voted that a humble address be made to the monarch to direct the government to release its impact assessments regarding the effects of Brexit on the national economy.

The motion, put forward by the opposition, requested:

That an humble Address be presented to Her Majesty, That she will be graciously pleased to give directions that the list of sectors analysed under the instruction of Her Majesty's Ministers, and referred to in the Answer of 26 June 2017 to Question 239, be laid before this House and that the impact assessments arising from those analyses be provided to the Committee on Exiting the European Union.

Following Exit Day on 31 January 2020 and the closure of the Department for Exiting the European Union, on 2 March the Exiting the European Union Committee was renamed the Committee on the Future Relationship with the European Union and its responsibilities altered to focus on the UK's relations with the EU after Brexit.

The committee was dissolved on 16 January 2021 as the temporary standing order lapsed. Chairmen Hilary Benn wrote to Leader of the House of Commons Jacob Rees-Mogg to extend the committee's lifespan in order to evaluate the impact of the EU–UK Trade and Cooperation Agreement on the UK. This request was denied, with Rees-Mogg saying other select committees could perform this function.

== Chairs ==
Committee chairs include those listed below.

Name	Start	End	Party	Constituency
Hilary Benn	19 October 2016	16 January 2021	Labour	Leeds Central

== Membership ==
On 19 October 2016, Hilary Benn was elected as the first chairman of the committee. Labour MPs voted for their remaining four representatives from a shortlist on 25 October. The Conservatives selected their representatives on 26 October. The remaining members were published in the House of Commons Order Paper for 27 October, except the SDLP's choice. After the 2017 general election another committee election was held Hilary Benn being re-elected as chair and members announced on 8 September 2017 due to be approved by the House of Commons on 11 September 2017. Of the committee 13 backed the remain campaign and 7 backed the leave campaign.

Hilary Benn was again re-elected chairman of the committee on 30 January 2020. With the renaming of the committee on 2 March, a new slate of members was agreed for the Parliament that had begun in December 2019, consisting of 12 Conservative, 7 Labour, and two SNP members.

== Membership 2016–17 ==
The chair was elected on 19 October 2016, with members being announced on 31 October 2016.

Member	Party	Constituency	EU Referendum position
The Rt Hon Hilary Benn MP (Chairman)	Labour	Leeds Central	Remain
The Rt Hon Alistair Burt MP	Conservative	North East Bedfordshire	Remain
The Rt Hon Alistair Carmichael MP	Liberal Democrats	Orkney and Shetland	Remain
Maria Caulfield	Conservative	Lewes	Leave
Joanna Cherry QC MP	Scottish National	Edinburgh South West	Remain
Jonathan Edwards MP	Plaid Cymru	Carmarthen East and Dinefwr	Remain
The Rt Hon Michael Gove MP	Conservative	Surrey Heath	Leave
Peter Grant MP	Scottish National	Glenrothes	Remain
Andrea Jenkyns MP	Conservative	Morley and Outwood	Leave
Jeremy Lefroy MP	Conservative	Stafford	Remain
The Rt Hon Peter Lilley MP	Conservative	Hitchin and Harpenden	Leave
Seema Malhotra MP	Labour	Feltham and Heston	Remain
Karl McCartney MP	Conservative	Lincoln	Leave
The Rt Hon Pat McFadden MP	Labour	Wolverhampton South East	Remain
Craig Mackinlay MP	Conservative	South Thanet	Leave
Dominic Raab MP	Conservative	Esher and Walton	Leave
Emma Reynolds MP	Labour	Wolverhampton North East	Remain
The Rt Hon Stephen Timms MP	Labour	East Ham	Remain
The Rt Hon John Whittingdale OBE MP	Conservative	Maldon	Leave
Sammy Wilson MP	Democratic Unionist	East Antrim	Leave

=== Changes 2016-2017 ===
Date	Outgoing Member & Party	Constituency	→	New Member & Party	Constituency	Source
7 November 2016	New seat		→	Mark Durkan MP (SDLP, remain)	Foyle	Hansard

== Membership 2017–19 ==
The chair was elected on 12 July 2017, with the members of the committee being announced on 11 September 2017.

Member	Party	Constituency	EU Referendum position
The Rt Hon Hilary Benn MP (Chair)	Labour	Leeds Central	Remain
Peter Bone MP	Conservative	Wellingborough	Leave
Joanna Cherry QC MP	Scottish National	Edinburgh South West	Remain
Sir Christopher Chope MP	Conservative	Christchurch	Leave
The Rt Hon Stephen Crabb MP	Conservative	Preseli Pembrokeshire	Remain
Jonathan Djanogly MP	Conservative	Huntingdon	Remain
Richard Graham MP	Conservative	Gloucester	Remain
Peter Grant MP	Scottish National	Glenrothes	Remain
Wera Hobhouse MP	Liberal Democrats	Bath	Remain
Andrea Jenkyns MP	Conservative	Morley and Outwood	Leave
Jeremy Lefroy MP	Conservative	Stafford	Remain
The Hon Stephen Kinnock MP	Labour	Aberavon	Remain
Seema Malhotra MP	Labour	Feltham and Heston	Remain
The Rt Hon Pat McFadden MP	Labour	Wolverhampton South East	Remain
Craig Mackinlay MP	Conservative	South Thanet	Leave
The Rt Hon Jacob Rees-Mogg MP	Conservative	North East Somerset	Leave
Emma Reynolds MP	Labour	Wolverhampton North East	Remain
The Rt Hon Stephen Timms MP	Labour	East Ham	Remain
The Rt Hon John Whittingdale OBE MP	Conservative	Maldon	Leave
Hywel Williams MP	Plaid Cymru	Arfon	Remain
The Rt Hon Sammy Wilson MP	Democratic Unionist	East Antrim	Leave

== Membership 2019–2021 ==
Member	Party	Constituency	EU Referendum position
The Rt Hon Hilary Benn MP (Chair)	Labour	Leeds Central	Remain
Peter Bone MP	Conservative	Wellingborough	Leave
Joanna Cherry QC MP	Scottish National	Edinburgh South West	Remain
Sir Christopher Chope MP	Conservative	Christchurch	Leave
Mark Eastwood MP	Conservative	Dewsbury	Leave
Florence Eshalomi MP	Labour	Vauxhall	Remain
Mark Fletcher MP	Conservative	Bolsover	Leave
Sally-Ann Hart MP	Conservative	Hastings and Rye	Leave
Antony Higginbotham MP	Conservative	Burnley	Leave
Dr Rupa Huq MP	Labour	Ealing Central and Acton	Remain
The Hon Stephen Kinnock MP	Labour	Aberavon	Remain
Seema Malhotra MP	Labour	Feltham and Heston	Remain
Nigel Mills MP	Conservative	Amber Valley	Leave
Matthew Pennycook MP	Labour	Greenwich and Woolwich	Remain
Nicola Richards MP	Conservative	West Bromwich East	Leave
Gary Sambrook MP	Conservative	Birmingham Northfield	Leave
Wes Streeting MP	Labour	Ilford North	Remain
Jane Stevenson MP	Conservative	Wolverhampton North East	Leave
Matt Vickers MP	Conservative	Stockton South	Leave
Dr Jamie Wallis MP	Conservative	Bridgend	Leave
Dr Philippa Whitford MP	Scottish National	Central Ayrshire	Remain

== Committee breakdown ==
Party	Members
Conservative	12
Labour	7
Scottish National	2
Total	21
