= Harry Greenway =

British politician (1934–2024)

Harry Greenway (4 October 1934 – 18 January 2024) was an English teacher who became a Conservative politician as the Member of Parliament for the Ealing North constituency from 1979 to 1997. He was especially passionate about horse-riding, introduced equestrian activities to the schools that he worked for and was the President of the Association of British Riding Schools for many years.

== Personal life and education ==
Harry Greenway was born in Worcester, England on 4 October 1934, the son of John Kenneth Greenway and Violet Adelaide (née Bell). He married in 1969, Carol Elizabeth Helena, elder daughter of the late Major John Robert Thomas Hooper, barrister at law and Metropolitan Stipendiary Magistrate, and Dorinda Hooper (née de Courcy Ireland).

Greenway had two daughters, Elizabeth and Eveline, and one son, Mark. He was educated at Warwick School and the College of St Mark & St John, known as 'Marjon', originally based in Chelsea, London, and now in Plymouth, Devon, as the University of St Mark & St John. Greenway also attended the University of Caen, Normandy.

Greenway was a supporter of Aston Villa FC. He died after a long illness on 18 January 2024, at the age of 89.

== Career in education ==
During the 1960s he was a schoolteacher of English and sport, later becoming the head house master of Telford House at Sir William Collins Secondary School for boys (later mixed, and renamed South Camden Community School and then Regent High School), in Charrington Street, Somers Town, London, a large state comprehensive school of about 1,200 boys at the time. He introduced several new sports to the school, including horse riding and other equine activities, winter sports, and men's hockey. He later became deputy headmaster of Sedgehill Secondary School, a very large comprehensive school in south-east London with approximately 2,200 pupils, between 1972 and 1979.

== Career in politics ==
Greenway contested Stepney at the Parliamentary election in 1970 and Stepney and Poplar in the two elections of February and October 1974. He was elected MP for Ealing North at the 1979 general election. He defeated the Labour candidate for Ealing North, Hilary Benn in both the subsequent 1983 and 1987 general elections. Greenway finally lost the seat to Labour's Stephen Pound at the 1997 general election. Greenway was appointed an Honorary Freeman of the London Borough of Ealing on 19 February 2008.

In 1992, Greenway, as a member of the Commons, was prosecuted for the common law offence of bribery of a person holding a public office. The case collapsed because of insufficient evidence of a related trial involving the Plasser railway machinery company.

Greenway was President of the Association of British Riding Schools (ABRS) for many years, until 2002. Greenway was interviewed in Michael Moore's TV Nation series (S1E9) about his views on caning in schools.

Greenway was a member of the council of the Open University, and in 2001 received an Honorary Doctorate from the university.

Parliament of the United Kingdom
Preceded by William Molloy	Member of Parliament for Ealing North; 1979–1997	Succeeded by Stephen Pound
