= Ealing West =

Parliamentary constituency in the United Kingdom, 1945–1950

- Former borough constituency for the House of Commons
- Major settlements: Hanwell, Greenford, and Northolt

1945–1950
- Seats: one
- Created from: Harrow (bulk from); Uxbridge (Northolt from)
- Replaced by: Ealing North (bulk); Ealing South (part) (newly created seats); Southall as to Hanwell

Ealing West was a constituency, 1945 to 1950 containing parts of the Municipal Borough of Ealing in Middlesex, in west north-west London. It returned one member (MP) to the House of Commons of the UK Parliament using the first past the post system.

== History ==
The constituency was created for the 1945 general election and abolished for the 1950 general election. From that date, the Municipal Borough of Ealing was represented by the new Ealing North and Ealing South; and by the Southall constituency which included two wards of the borough of Ealing until that constituency's abolition in February 1974.

== Boundaries ==
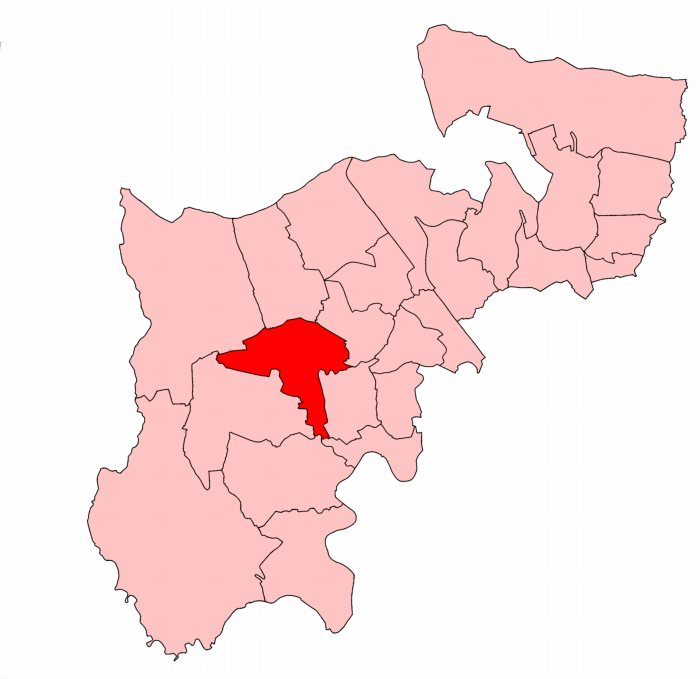
Ealing West in Middlesex 1945–50

The Municipal Borough of Ealing wards of: Greenford North, Greenford South, Hanwell North, Hanwell South, and Northolt.

== Members of Parliament ==
Election	Member	Party
1945	James Hudson	Labour
1950	constituency abolished: see Ealing North and Ealing South	

== Election results ==
=== Elections in the 1940s ===
General election 1945: Ealing West
Party	Candidate	Votes	%	±%
Labour Co-op	James Hudson	29,115	60.3	
Conservative	Bernard Sunley	12,880	26.7	
Liberal	Herbert Mostyn Lewis	6,258	13.0	
Majority		16,235	33.6	
Turnout		48,253	74.4	
Labour win (new seat)				
