= John Barter =

British politician

John Wilfred Barter (6 October 1917 – 17 December 1983) was a British Conservative Party politician.

Barter was a company secretary. He began his political career in 1949, when he was elected to the Middlesex County Council; he served as its final chairman, from 1964 until 1965, when the county was abolished. He was the Member of Parliament for Ealing North from the 1955 general election until the 1964 general election when he was defeated. He contested the seat unsuccessfully in the general elections of 1966 and 1970. In 1975, he became chairman of the Ealing and Acton Building Society.

Barter was married and a father of three. He died at Cromwell Hospital in London on 17 December 1983, at the age of 66.

Parliament of the United Kingdom
Preceded by James Hudson	Member of Parliament for Ealing North; 1955–1964	Succeeded by William Molloy
