= James Hudson (politician) =

British Labour politician (1881–1962)

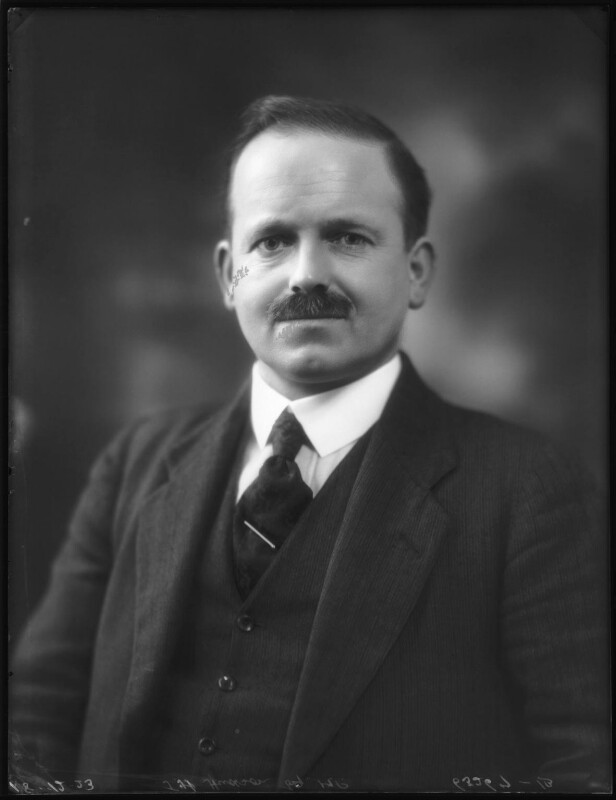
Hindle

James Hindle Hudson (27 September 1881 – 10 January 1962) was a British Labour Party (and later Labour Co-operative) politician, who served as a Member of Parliament (MP) for 18 years in two periods between 1923 and 1955.

A lifelong Quaker and pacifist, Hudson was a conscientious objector in the First World War.

He contested the Huddersfield seat at the 1922 general election, and won the seat the following year, at the 1923 election. When the Labour Party split in 1931 over Ramsay MacDonald's formation of a National Government, he lost his seat to the National Liberal candidate, William Mabane.

Hudson unsuccessfully contested the Altrincham by-election in 1933 (where all three candidates were former MPs), and at the 1935 general election he was defeated in Stockport. After a 14-year absence, he was returned to the House of Commons at the 1945 general election as Labour Co-operative MP for the London constituency of Ealing West.

That seat was abolished in boundary changes for the 1950 general election, when he was elected for the new Ealing North seat, which he held until his defeat at the 1955 general election by the Conservative candidate, John Barter.

== See also ==
- 1933 Altrincham by-election

Parliament of the United Kingdom
Preceded by Sir Arthur Marshall	Member of Parliament for Huddersfield; 1923–1931	Succeeded by William Mabane
New constituency	Member of Parliament for Ealing West; 1945–1950	Constituency abolished
New constituency	Member of Parliament for Ealing North; 1950–1955	Succeeded by John Barter
Party political offices
Preceded by R. C. Wallhead	Lancashire Division representative on the Independent Labour Party National Administrative Council; 1920–1925	Succeeded by Elijah Sandham
