= 2007 Labour Party deputy leadership election =

British leadership election to replace John Prescott

- 6–24 June 2007
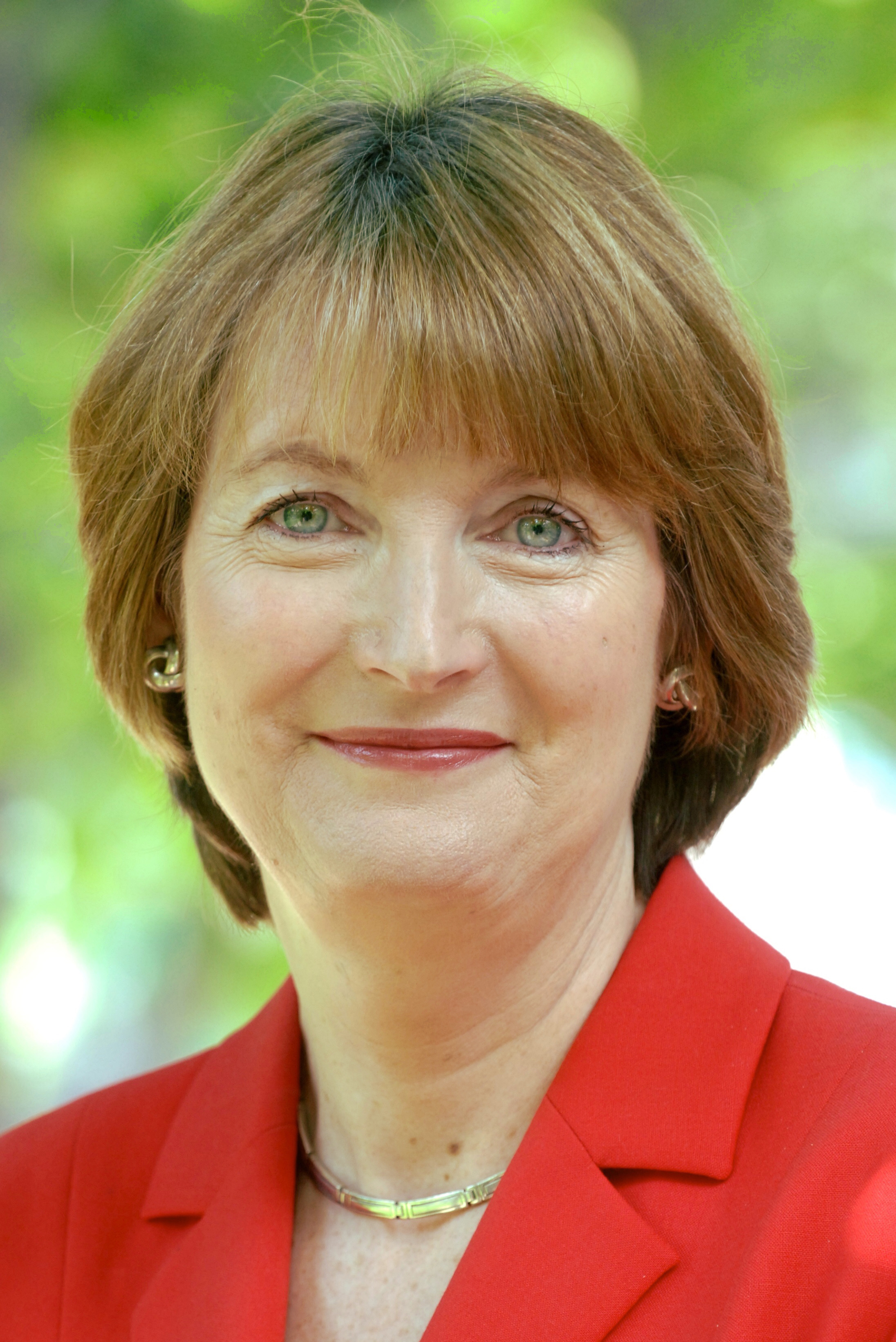

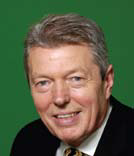

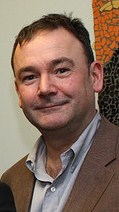

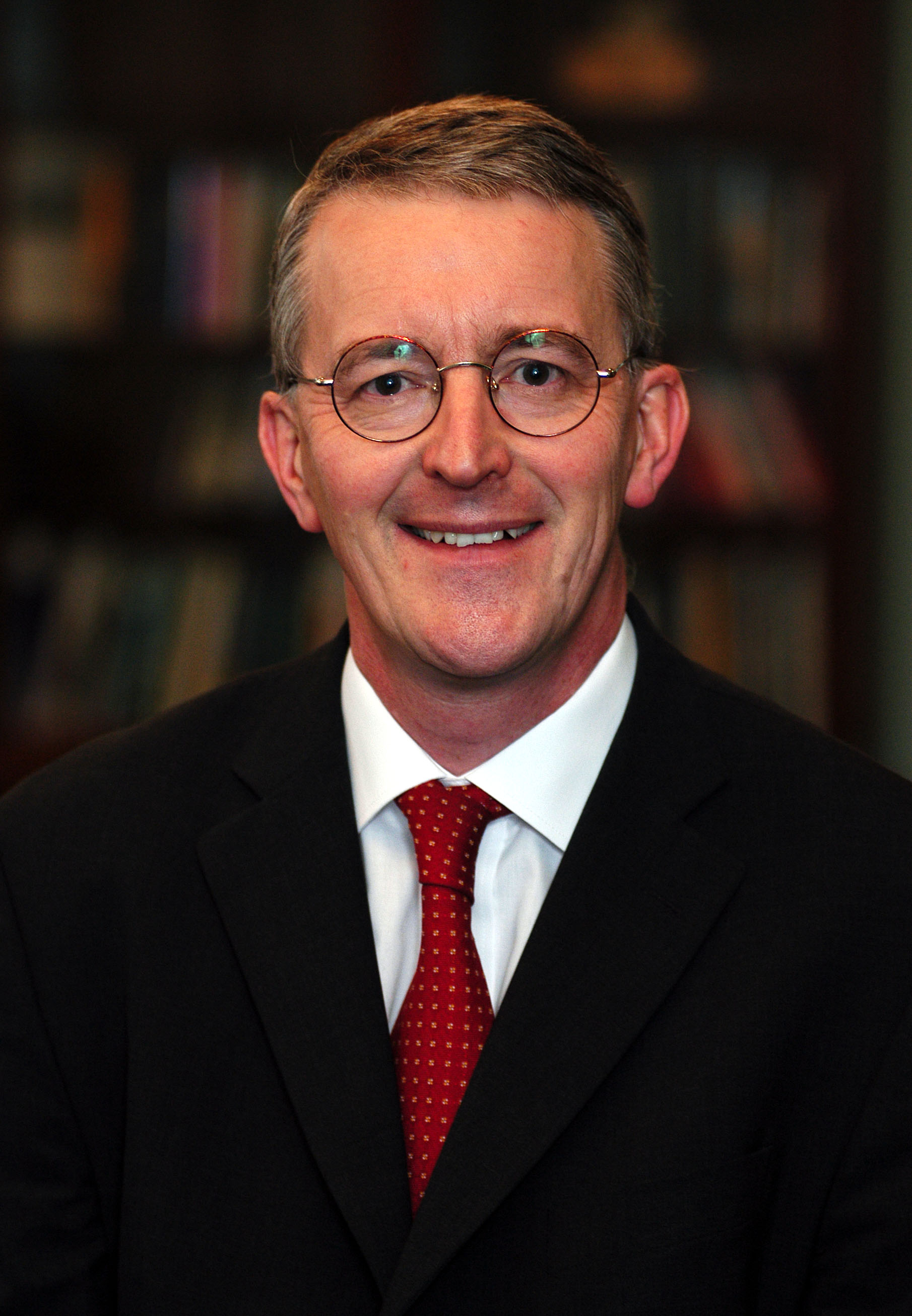

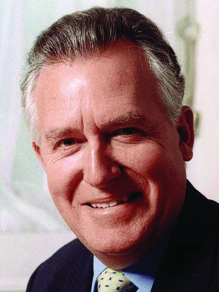

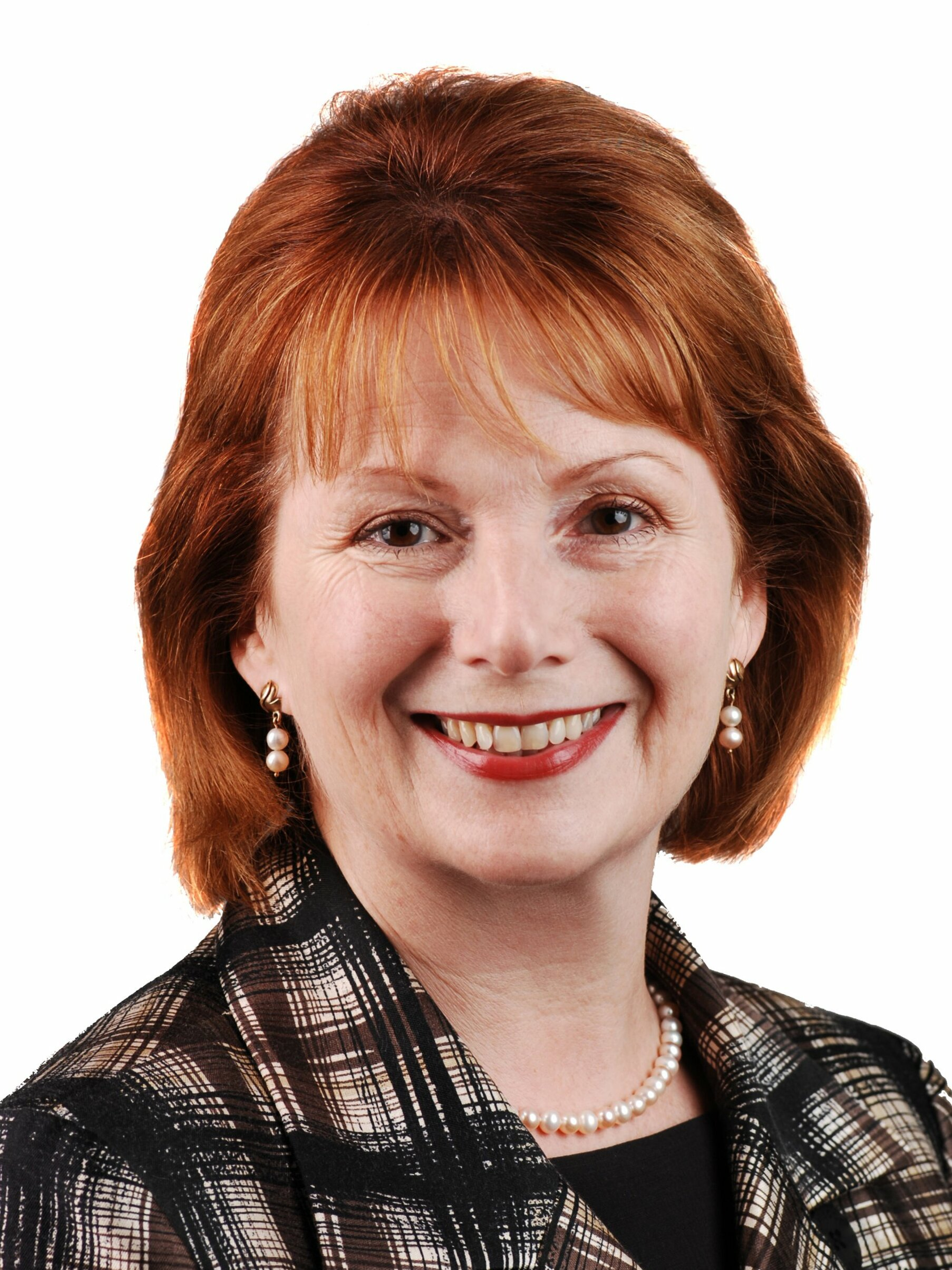
Candidate	Harriet Harman	Alan Johnson	Jon Cruddas
First pref.	18.9%	18.2%	19.4%
Final pref.	50.4%	49.6%	—
Candidate	Hilary Benn	Peter Hain	Hazel Blears
First pref.	16.4%	15.3%	11.8%
Final pref.	—	—	—
Deputy Leader before election
John Prescott
Elected Deputy Leader
Harriet Harman

The 2007 Labour Party deputy leadership election was a British political party election for the position of deputy leader of the Labour Party. John Prescott, the previous deputy leader, announced on 10 May 2007 that he was standing down from that position and that he would be resigning as deputy prime minister, about the same time that Tony Blair tendered his resignation as prime minister.

Harriet Harman was elected deputy leader on 24 June 2007 with 50.43% of the final redistributed vote. However, Gordon Brown, who was elected leader on the same day, did not subsequently appoint her deputy prime minister, instead leaving the office vacant.

There had been reports that an increasing number of Labour MPs and members of the NEC had been attempting to get the election for the position of deputy leader abandoned in order to save the £2,000,000 it was estimated that the contest would cost. There would have had to have been a special conference convened if such an alteration was to be made.

== Successfully nominated candidates ==
- Hilary Benn – 47 nominations
- Hazel Blears – 49 nominations
- Jon Cruddas – 49 nominations
- Peter Hain – 51 nominations
- Harriet Harman – 65 nominations
- Alan Johnson – 73 nominations

All six declared candidates secured more than the 45 nominations from MPs that was the minimum requirement for them to get onto the ballot paper by close of nominations at 12:30 UTC+1 on 17 May 2007.

== Results ==
The election took place using Alternative Vote in an electoral college, with a third of the votes allocated to MPs and MEPs, a third to individual members of the Labour Party, and a third to individual members of affiliated organisations, mainly trade unions.

Harriet Harman won the contest, her victory heavily depending on support from individual party members with preference votes narrowing her opponents' lead and she led in the final round only. The final total percentage votes for the two main candidates after redistribution were almost identical to those of the final round of the 1981 contest.

Round 1
Candidate	Affiliates (33.3%)	Members (33.3%)	MPs/MEPs (33.3%)	Total
Jon Cruddas	27.3%	17.0%	13.9%	19.4%
Harriet Harman	13.1%	24.1%	19.6%	18.9%
Alan Johnson	13.7%	16.6%	24.3%	18.2%
Hilary Benn	14.8%	21.7%	12.8%	16.4%
Peter Hain	19.9%	11.6%	14.4%	15.3%
Hazel Blears ✗	11.3%	9.0%	15.0%	11.8%

Round 2
Candidate	Affiliates (33.3%)	Members (33.3%)	MPs/MEPs (33.3%)	Total
Alan Johnson	17.7%	19.1%	34.4%	23.7%
Harriet Harman	15.5%	26.4%	21.9%	21.2%
Jon Cruddas	28.9%	18.0%	14.2%	20.4%
Hilary Benn	16.7%	23.8%	14.2%	18.2%
Peter Hain ✗	21.3%	12.7%	15.3%	16.4%

Round 3
Candidate	Affiliates (33.3%)	Members (33.3%)	MPs/MEPs (33.3%)	Total
Alan Johnson	23.5%	22.0%	38.4%	27.9%
Harriet Harman	21.4%	30.5%	25.9%	25.9%
Jon Cruddas	33.1%	19.8%	18.9%	23.9%
Hilary Benn ✗	22.2%	27.9%	17.0%	22.3%

Round 4
Candidate	Affiliates (33.3%)	Members (33.3%)	MPs/MEPs (33.3%)	Total
Alan Johnson	30.8%	32.1%	46.2%	36.4%
Harriet Harman	28.4%	41.5%	30.9%	33.6%
Jon Cruddas ✗	40.9%	26.5%	23.0%	30.1%

Round 5
Candidate	Affiliates (33.3%)	Members (33.3%)	MPs/MEPs (33.3%)	Total
Harriet Harman ✓	48.6%	56.5%	46.3%	50.4%
Alan Johnson	51.5%	43.5%	53.8%	49.6%

== Suggested candidates not standing ==
Jeremy Corbyn announced in December 2006 he was considering running for the Deputy Leadership. However, there was no subsequent statement from him on it and he nominated Hilary Benn for the Deputy Leadership. No other eligible person – i.e. Labour MP – announced they were considering standing for the position except for the six nominated candidates and Jeremy Corbyn. Corbyn would go on to be elected Leader of the Labour Party in the 2015 leadership election, appointing Benn his Shadow Foreign Secretary.

There was some speculation about Ed Balls, Patricia Hewitt, David Miliband and Jack Straw standing for the position, but no sign that they had ever said they were inclined to run and all had ruled themselves out before nominations opened.

== Candidate spending ==
The number of donations made to each candidate for their campaigns were:

- Hilary Benn – £4,000
- Hazel Blears – £73,000
- Jon Cruddas – £143,000
- Peter Hain – £180,000–£200,000
- Harriet Harman – £46,000, plus £50,000 of her own loans
- Alan Johnson – £54,000

== See also ==
- 2007 Labour Party leadership election (UK)
