= Hilary Benn =

British politician (born 1953)

The Right Honourable Hilary Benn MP
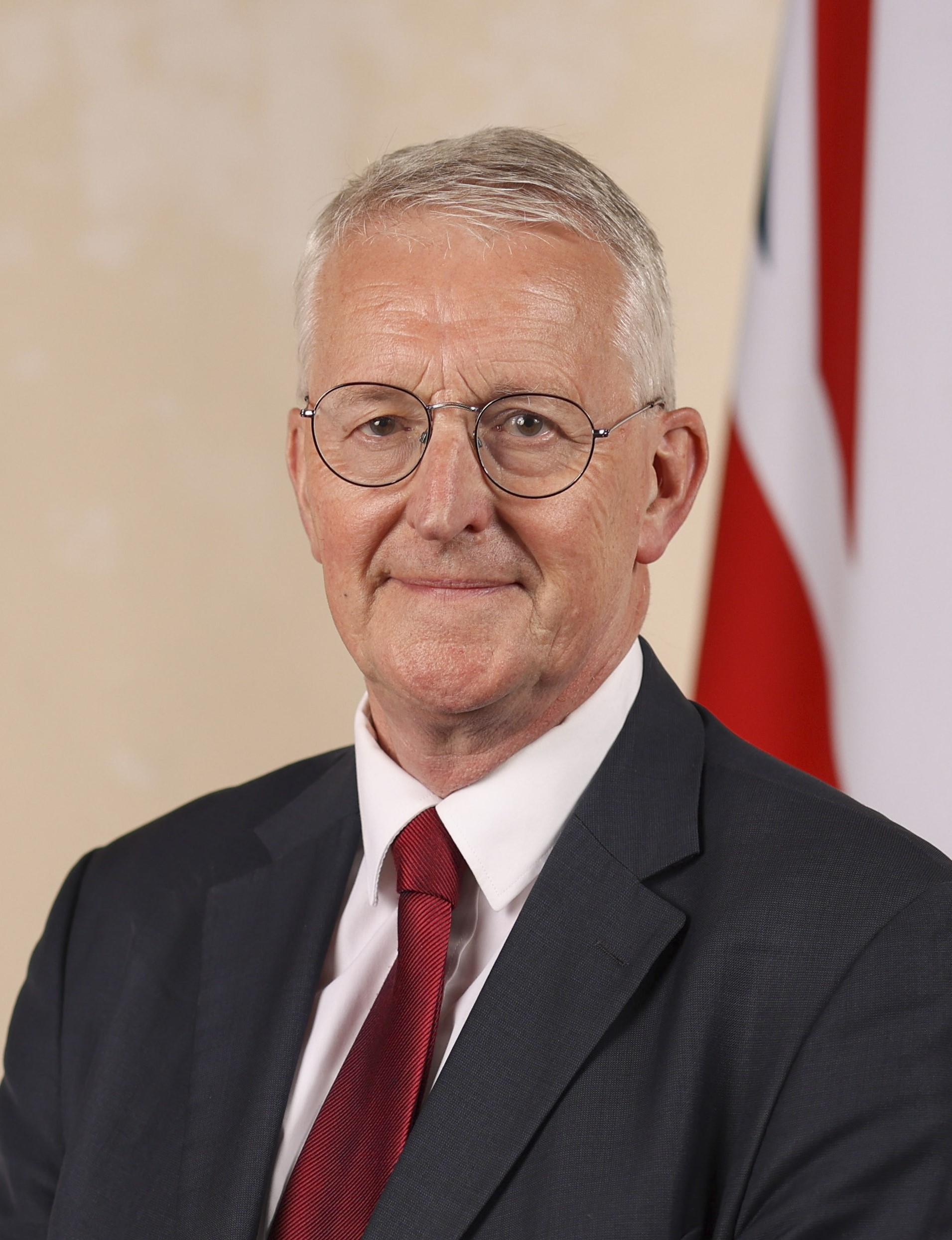
- Official portrait, 2024

Secretary of State for Northern Ireland
- In office 5 July 2024 – 20 July 2026
- Prime Minister: Keir Starmer
- Preceded by: Chris Heaton-Harris
- Succeeded by: Chris Bryant

Secretary of State for Environment, Food and Rural Affairs
- In office 28 June 2007 – 11 May 2010
- Prime Minister: Gordon Brown
- Preceded by: David Miliband
- Succeeded by: Caroline Spelman

Secretary of State for International Development
- In office 6 October 2003 – 28 June 2007
- Prime Minister: Tony Blair
- Preceded by: The Baroness Amos
- Succeeded by: Douglas Alexander
Shadow Cabinet portfolios
Shadow Secretary of State for Northern Ireland
In office 4 September 2023 – 5 July 2024
Leader	Keir Starmer
Preceded by	Peter Kyle
Succeeded by	Alex Burghart
Shadow Foreign Secretary
In office 11 May 2015 – 26 June 2016
Leader	Harriet Harman (acting); Jeremy Corbyn
Preceded by	Douglas Alexander
Succeeded by	Emily Thornberry
Acting Shadow First Secretary of State
In office 11 May 2015 – 13 September 2015
Leader	Harriet Harman (acting)
Preceded by	Harriet Harman (Note: as Shadow Deputy Prime Minister)
Succeeded by	Angela Eagle
Shadow Secretary of State for Communities and Local Government
In office 7 October 2011 – 11 May 2015
Leader	Ed Miliband
Preceded by	Caroline Flint
Succeeded by	Emma Reynolds
Shadow Leader of the House of Commons
In office 8 October 2010 – 7 October 2011
Leader	Ed Miliband
Preceded by	Rosie Winterton
Succeeded by	Angela Eagle
Shadow Secretary of State for Environment, Food and Rural Affairs
In office 11 May 2010 – 8 October 2010
Leader	Harriet Harman (acting); Ed Miliband
Preceded by	Nick Herbert
Succeeded by	Mary Creagh
Junior ministerial offices
Minister of State for International Development
In office 13 May 2003 – 6 October 2003
Prime Minister	Tony Blair
Preceded by	Sally Keeble
Succeeded by	Gareth Thomas
Parliamentary Under-Secretary of State for Prisons and Probations
In office 29 May 2002 – 13 May 2003
Prime Minister	Tony Blair
Preceded by	Keith Bradley
Succeeded by	Fiona Mactaggart
Parliamentary Under-Secretary of State for International Development
In office 11 June 2001 – 28 May 2002
Prime Minister	Tony Blair
Preceded by	Chris Mullin
Succeeded by	Sally Keeble
Other offices held
Chair of the Committee on the Future Relationship with the European Union (Note: Exiting the European Union (2016–2020))
In office 19 October 2016 – 16 January 2021
Preceded by	Office established
Succeeded by	Office abolished

Member of Parliament for Leeds South Leeds Central (1999–2024)
- Incumbent
- Assumed office 10 June 1999
- Preceded by: Derek Fatchett
- Majority: 11,279 (35.6%)

Personal details
- Born: Hilary James Wedgwood Benn; 26 November 1953 (age 72) Hammersmith, London, England
- Party: Labour
- Spouses: Rosalind Retey (m. 1973; died 1979); Sally Clark (m. 1982)
- Children: 4
- Parents: Tony Benn (father); Caroline DeCamp (mother)
- Relatives: Stephen Benn, 3rd Viscount Stansgate (brother); Melissa Benn (sister); Emily Benn (niece)
- Education: University of Sussex (BA)
- Website: hilarybennmp.com

Hilary James Wedgwood Benn (born 26 November 1953) is a British politician who served as Secretary of State for Northern Ireland from 2024 to 2026. A member of the Labour Party, he has been the Member of Parliament (MP) for Leeds South, formerly Leeds Central, since 1999. He previously served in various ministerial positions under Prime Ministers Sir Tony Blair and Gordon Brown from 2001 to 2010.

Born in Hammersmith, London, he is the second son of veteran Labour MP Tony Benn and educationalist Caroline Benn. He studied Russian and Eastern European Studies at the University of Sussex and went on to work as a policy researcher for two trade unions, ASTMS and MSF. Benn was elected as a councillor on Ealing Borough Council in 1979 and was Deputy Leader of the Council from 1986 to 1990. He was also the unsuccessful Labour parliamentary candidate for the Ealing North constituency at both the 1983 and 1987 general elections. Following the 1997 general election, Benn was appointed a special adviser to Education Secretary David Blunkett before winning a by-election in Leeds Central in 1999.

Under Tony Blair, Benn served as a Parliamentary Under-Secretary of State for International Development from 2001 to 2002 and for Prisons and Probation from 2002 to 2003. He returned to the Department for International Development as a Minister of State in May 2003. In October 2003, he was appointed to Blair's Cabinet as Secretary of State for International Development. In 2007, Benn was a candidate for Deputy Leader of the Labour Party, but lost to Harriet Harman, finishing in fourth place. Benn later served under Gordon Brown as Secretary of State for Environment, Food and Rural Affairs from 2007 to 2010.

Benn returned to opposition following the 2010 general election and became Shadow Environment Secretary in the First Harman shadow cabinet. Under Ed Miliband, Benn was the Shadow Leader of the House of Commons from 2010 to 2011, and Shadow Communities and Local Government Secretary from 2011 to 2015. Following the 2015 general election, Benn became the interim Shadow Foreign Secretary under Harriet Harman before he was reappointed to the role under Jeremy Corbyn. He was dismissed from the position in 2016 after he expressed no confidence in Corbyn's leadership. On the backbenches, he was Chair of the Committee on the Future Relationship with the European Union from 2016 to 2021. He returned to the Shadow Cabinet as Shadow Secretary of State for Northern Ireland under Keir Starmer in the 2023 British shadow cabinet reshuffle. Following Labour's victory in the 2024 general election, Benn was appointed Secretary of State for Northern Ireland in the Starmer ministry.

== Early life and education ==
Hilary Benn was born on 26 November 1953 in Hammersmith. He is the second son of former Labour Cabinet Minister Tony Benn and American-born educationalist Caroline Benn (née DeCamp). Benn is a fourth-generation MP – his father, his paternal grandfather Lord Stansgate, and his great-grandfathers Daniel Holmes and Sir John Benn were all Members of Parliament, mostly supporting the Liberal Party.

Benn was educated at Norland Place School and Westminster Under School, both prep schools in London, and then at Holland Park School, a state comprehensive secondary school. He studied Russian and Eastern European Studies at the University of Sussex, graduating with a Bachelor of Arts (BA) degree in 1974.

Benn has an older brother, Stephen, a younger sister Melissa and younger brother, Joshua. Reflecting on his upbringing, he said: "I grew up in a household where we talked about the state of the world over breakfast, when we ate at night, and all points in between".

== Early political career ==
After graduation, Benn became a research officer with ASTMS. During the 1975 referendum on British membership of the European Economic Community, he served on the research team for the National Referendum Campaign, which argued for a No vote.

In 1980, he was seconded to the Labour Party to act as a joint secretary to the finance panel of the Labour Party Commission of Inquiry. In 1979, he was elected to Ealing Borough Council where he served as deputy leader from 1986 to 1990.

He was the Labour Party candidate for Ealing North at the 1983 and 1987 general elections. On both occasions he was defeated by the Conservative candidate Harry Greenway. Reflecting on the defeat at the 1983 general election, Benn said: "That was a formative experience for me because we went out on the doorstep and we didn't win the public's confidence. It made me very uncomfortable. Personally, that left a mark on me." At the 1983 general election, Benn won 32.8% of the vote, and four years later won 27.8% of the vote.

Benn applied to become head of Labour Party research under the leadership of John Smith, but was unsuccessful. In 1993 he became Head of Policy for Manufacturing Science and Finance. At the 1997 general election, he was on the shortlist for the seat of Pontefract and Castleford, but eventually lost to Yvette Cooper. Following the 1997 general election, Benn served as a special adviser to David Blunkett, then the Secretary of State for Education and Employment.

== Parliamentary career ==
In 1999, Benn was selected as the Labour candidate for a by-election in Leeds Central following the untimely death of Foreign Office Minister Derek Fatchett at the age of 53 years old. During the by-election campaign, he described himself as "a Benn, but not a Bennite".

Benn won the Leeds Central by-election on 10 June 1999 following a turnout of 19.6%, the second-smallest turnout at a by-election since the Second World War; this was beaten in the 2012 Manchester Central by-election which had a mere 18.2% turnout. In response to the poor turnout, he said: "The turnout is very disappointing and in a democracy this is a concern for all of us." Benn was elected with 48.2% of the vote and a majority of 2,293 votes.

He made his maiden speech in the House of Commons on Wednesday 23 June 1999.

=== Early ministerial career (2001–2003) ===
Benn was re-elected at the 2001 general election with an increased vote share of 66.9% and an increased majority of 14,381. Following the election, Benn was appointed as a Parliamentary Under-Secretary of State at the Department for International Development. In the 2002 reshuffle, he become the Parliamentary Under-Secretary of State for Prisons and Probation at the Home Office, serving as a deputy to Lord Falconer as Minister of State (Criminal Justice). At the Home Office, he led a task force investigating internet paedophilia, which subsequently recommended the introduction of the new offence of 'grooming'.

In January 2003, he had responsibility for introducing the Sexual Offences Bill in the House of Commons.

In May 2003, he was moved from the Home Office back to the Department for International Development, where he served as Minister of State. He also acted as the Department's Commons spokesperson, as then-Secretary of State for International Development, Baroness Amos, was a member of the House of Lords.

=== Secretary of State for International Development (2003–2007) ===
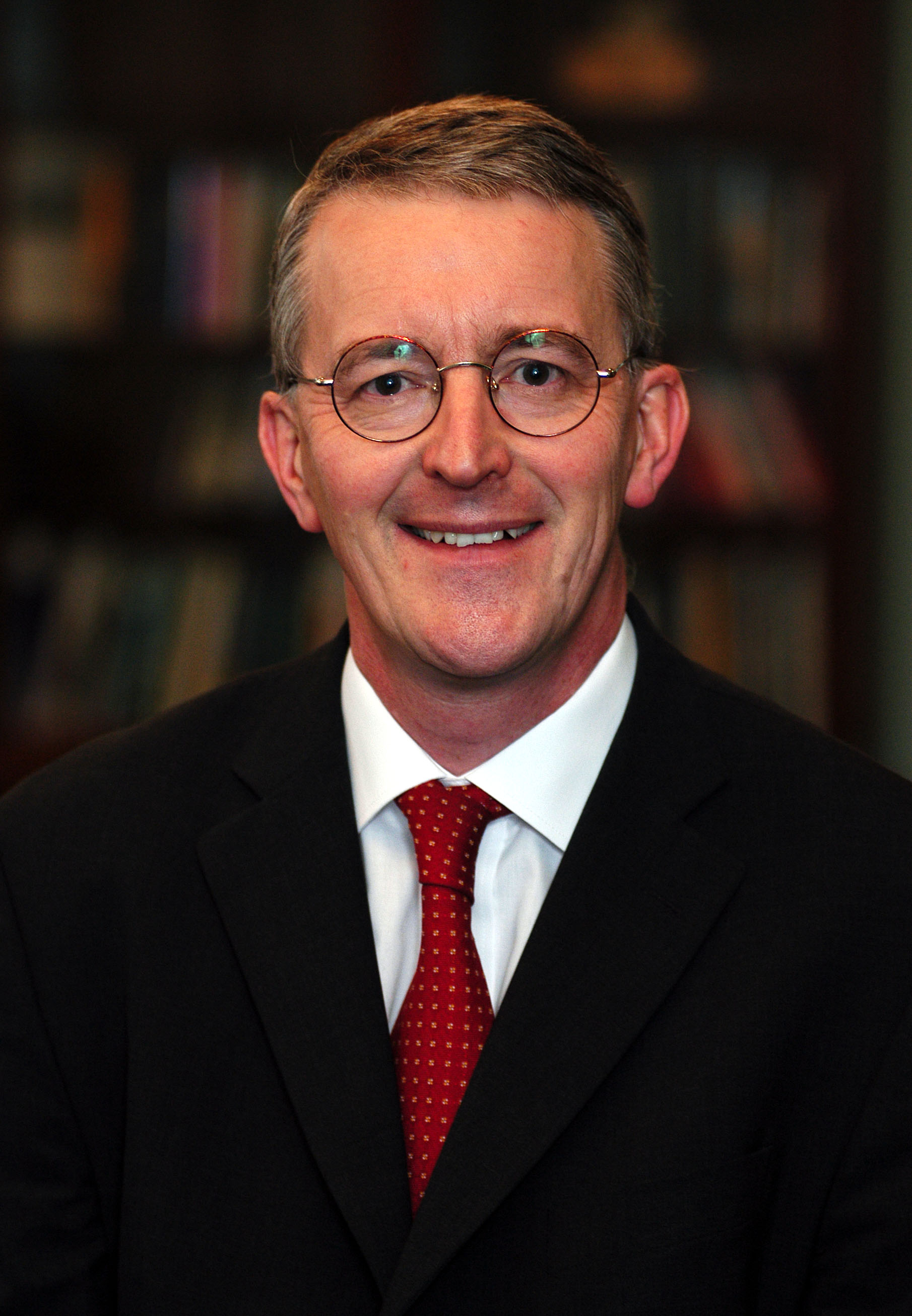
Official portrait, 2004

In 2003, Benn was promoted to the cabinet from his position as Minister of State to become Secretary of State for International Development, after Baroness Amos was appointed as Leader of the House of Lords. When he informed his family, his father Tony said that "the house rocked with delight". Following his first Department for International Development (DfID) question time, Benn was criticised by Liberal Democrat international development spokesperson Tom Brake over his comments about opening Iraq up to foreign investors.

The Guardian noted that one of Benn's main challenges as Secretary of State for International Development would be the "fraught reconstruction of Iraq". In February 2004, Benn said that restoring security in Iraq would be "absolutely fundamental" to a reconstruction effort.

Benn oversaw the DfID response to the 2003 Bam earthquake, which included "helping to coordinate efforts on the ground, liaise with other international relief organisations and work with the Iranian government to ensure that the right equipment gets to where it is needed as quickly as possible." He subsequently oversaw the UK's response to the 2004 Indian Ocean earthquake and tsunami, the 2005 Kashmir earthquake and the 2005 Nias–Simeulue earthquake, to which he responded "with skill".

In July 2004, Benn set out five stages to end the Darfur War that had begun in February 2003. The stages were: "to get help to the people in the camps and elsewhere", "to get more people and more capacity on the ground to deliver this aid", "security – urgently", getting the "government of Sudan... to disarm the militias and provide security to the people" and "Finally, this crisis needs a political solution".

Benn has also been a critic of the United Nations. In December 2004, he called for reform of the UN Office for the Coordination of Humanitarian Affairs (UNHCA), and also said that the UN High Commissioner for Refugees (UNHCR) was "supposed to coordinate but does not have the power of resources to do the job properly". Benn has been credited with helping to found the Central Emergency Response Fund.

At the 2005 general election, Benn was again re-elected, with a decreased vote share of 60% and a decreased majority of 11,866.

On 13 June 2005, he committed an additional £19 million to the African Union security mission in Darfur, bringing the total UK contribution to £32 million. Benn led the UK negotiating team at the 2006 Darfur peace negotiations.

In 2007, the New Statesman noted that "Benn's work at DfID ... has often been at odds with the Bush administration". In particular, an example was Benn's opposition to the United States policy of increasing abstinence when it came to fighting AIDS in Africa, whereas Benn took a "harm reduction" approach. He was also dismissive of US policy, saying: "Abstinence-only programmes are fine if you want to abstain, but not everybody does."

==== Labour Party Deputy Leadership election, 2007 ====
In late October 2006, Benn announced that he would be standing in the 2007 Labour Party deputy leadership election. One of his earliest backers was Dennis Skinner, and it was also announced that Ian McCartney would play an important role in his campaign. On 6 December, an open letter was published in The Guardian signed by six Labour parliamentarians that said Benn's election as Deputy Leader could rebuild a "coalition of trust" in the Labour Party.

In 2007, Benn was the bookmakers' favourite for the Deputy Leadership of the Labour Party. Early polls in the deputy leadership contest showed him to be the grassroots' favourite – in a YouGov poll of party members, Benn was top with 27%, followed by Education Secretary Alan Johnson with 18%, Environment Secretary David Miliband with 17%, Justice Minister Harriet Harman with 10%, and Labour Party Chair Hazel Blears with 7%. The contest was launched on 14 May 2007 after the resignation of incumbent deputy leader John Prescott, Benn had some difficulties securing the necessary 45 nominations required to get on the ballot paper but he acquired the support needed to join five other candidates—Hazel Blears, Harriet Harman, Alan Johnson, Peter Hain and backbencher Jon Cruddas. Supporting nominations from constituency Labour parties showed Hilary Benn obtaining 25%, Jon Cruddas 22%, Harriet Harman 19%, Alan Johnson 14%, Hazel Blears 12% and Peter Hain 8% of the constituency parties that voted. The contest closed on Sunday 24 June 2007, with Harriet Harman winning. Benn was eliminated in the third round of voting, having reached 22.33% of the vote. Harman was elected in the fifth round with 50.43% of the vote.

=== Secretary of State for Environment, Food and Rural Affairs (2007–2010) ===
In 2007, Benn was appointed as the Secretary of State for Environment, Food and Rural Affairs, following the election of Gordon Brown as Party Leader, and the promotion of David Miliband to Foreign Secretary. As Secretary of State for the Environment, Food and Rural Affairs, he introduced and implemented the UK's Climate Change Act 2008. It was also his responsibility as Secretary to respond to the threat to cattle from Mycobacterium bovis, colloquially referred to as bovine tuberculosis (TB). The recommended option from the Chief Scientific Advisor until 2007, Sir David King, was a badger cull. In April 2010, a badger cull was announced in Wales, after the high court in Cardiff rejected a legal challenge from The Badger Trust.

During the parliamentary expenses scandal, Benn was picked out by several national newspapers as one of only three senior members of the Labour Party to have not presented expenses beyond reproach. The Guardian stated: "When all Westminster MPs' total expenditures are ranked, Benn's bill is the fifteenth least expensive for the taxpayer".

At the 2010 general election, Benn was again re-elected with a decreased vote share of 49.3% and a decreased majority of 10,645. Following the election, he served as Shadow Secretary of State for Environment, Food and Rural Affairs in 2010 during Harriet Harman's interim leadership of the Labour Party. In the Miliband shadow cabinet, announced on 8 October 2010, he was appointed Shadow Leader of the House of Commons. When Miliband reshuffled his cabinet on 7 October 2011, he was named Shadow Secretary of State for Communities and Local Government.

=== Shadow Foreign Secretary ===
At the 2015 general election, Benn was again re-elected, increasing his share of the vote to 55% and increasing his majority to 16,967. Following the election, Benn was named Shadow Foreign Secretary in the Second Harman shadow cabinet. On 17 June, Benn deputised for Harriet Harman at Prime Minister's Questions, when David Cameron was overseas in Europe, and Benn was Harman's unofficial deputy. One of the questions he asked challenged George Osborne, who was deputising for Cameron, over whether HMS Bulwark was under active review as revealed in a report by The Guardian. Writing for the New Statesman, George Eaton commended Benn's performance, saying: "Benn smartly denied the Chancellor the chance to deploy his favourite attack lines by devoting his six questions to national security and the Mediterranean refugee crisis, rather than the economy."

In September 2015, both leadership and deputy leadership elections took place in the Labour Party. Benn supported Caroline Flint in the deputy leadership election, and Andy Burnham in the leadership election. Following the election of Jeremy Corbyn as Leader of the Labour Party in September, Benn retained the role of Shadow Foreign Secretary in the Corbyn shadow cabinet, and stressed that Labour would campaign to remain in the EU "under all circumstances". This was later affirmed by a joint statement released by both Benn and Corbyn, which said that "Labour will be campaigning in the referendum for the UK to stay in the European Union."

On 20 September, Benn signalled that Labour could back Prime Minister David Cameron's plans for airstrikes against the Islamic State (ISIL) in Syria: "What we've said consistently is that the government, if it has got a proposal, should bring that to the House of Commons. In relation to airstrikes, we shall look at the objectives. At the moment we don't know what the proposal is ... We will judge that against the objective, the legal base..." In November 2015, following the Paris attacks that had occurred a few days earlier, Benn initially agreed with Corbyn's position rejecting the proposal for Britain to launch airstrikes against ISIL in Syria and any intervention. However, Benn subsequently supported plans laid out by the Prime Minister, and said he would not resign over his disagreement with Corbyn because he was "doing [his] job as the Shadow Foreign Secretary". Benn had voted in favour of the Iraq War in 2003 and the 2011 military intervention in Libya, but voted against military intervention against Syrian President Bashar al-Assad in 2013.

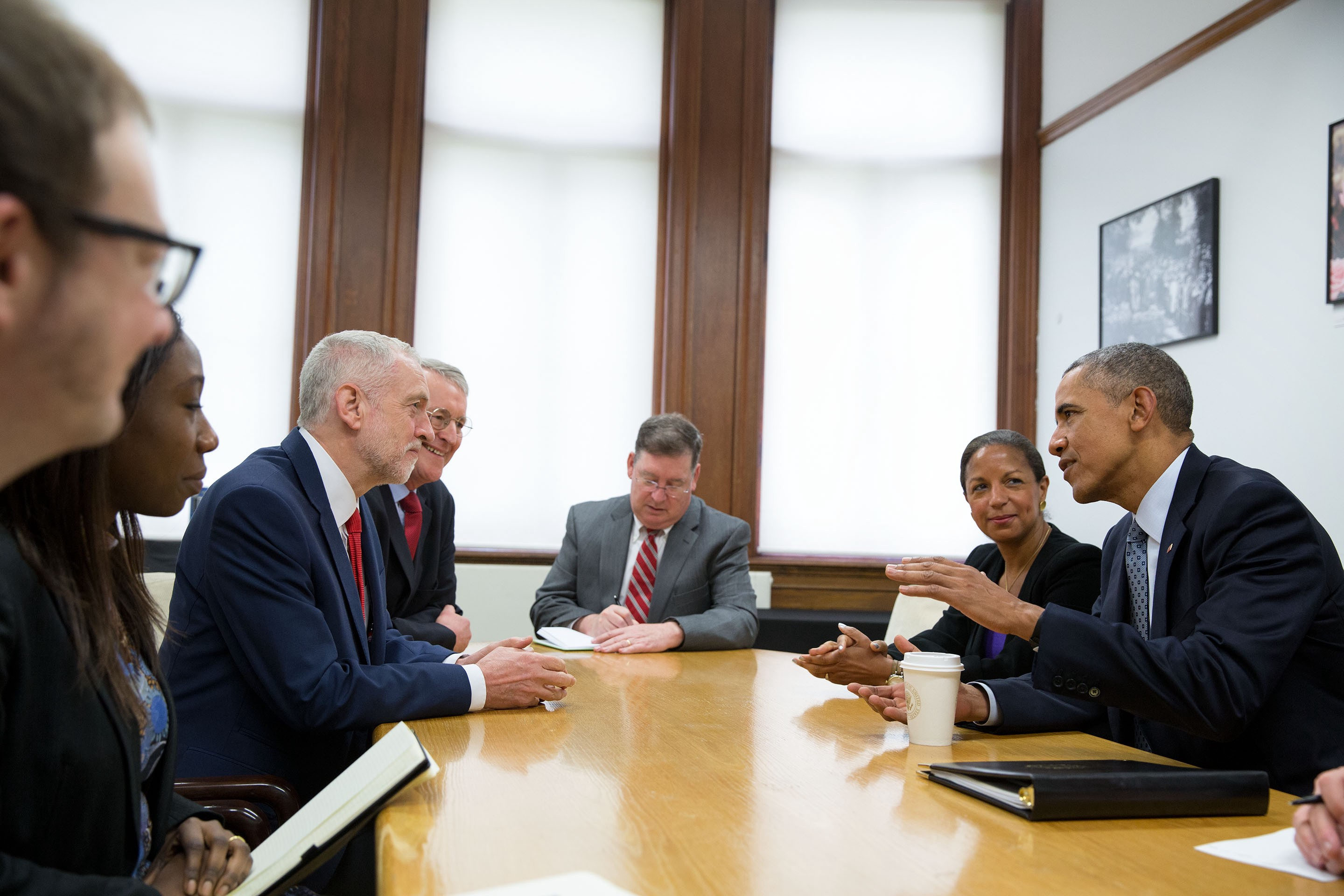
Benn and Jeremy Corbyn meet with President Barack Obama in April 2016.

On 2 December 2015, Benn made the closing speech for the official opposition in the House of Commons debate on airstrikes against ISIL in Syria. The speech opposed the position espoused by Corbyn against the government's motion. The speech was applauded by MPs on both sides of the house, a gesture not usually permitted in the Commons. Along with a minority of shadow cabinet colleagues, he voted for airstrikes in Syria and the motion passed by a higher-than-expected majority of 174 votes. The Conservative Foreign Secretary Philip Hammond described Benn's oration as "one of the truly great speeches in Commons history". Speaking to the BBC the following day, Shadow Chancellor John McDonnell compared Benn's speech to that given by Prime Minister Tony Blair in 2003 ahead of the Iraq War. McDonnell described it as an "excellent" piece of oratory, but added: "The greatest oratory can lead us to the greatest mistakes." According to Labour MP Jamie Reed, following his speech, in the eyes of Corbyn, Benn became "at best a rebel, at worst a traitor."

In January 2016, Benn criticised British involvement in Saudi Arabian–led intervention in Yemen after a leaked UN report concluded there had been "widespread and systematic" attacks on civilian targets in violation of international humanitarian law.

On 25 June 2016, The Observer revealed that Benn "called fellow MPs over the weekend to suggest that he will ask Corbyn to stand down if there is significant support for a move against the leader. He has also asked shadow cabinet colleagues to join him in resigning if the Labour leader ignores that request." During a phone call in the early hours of 26 June, Benn told Corbyn that Labour MPs and shadow cabinet members had "no confidence in our ability to win the election" under his leadership. Corbyn then dismissed Benn from his position as Shadow Foreign Secretary. In a statement issued at 03:30, Benn said: "It has now become clear that there is widespread concern among Labour MPs and in the shadow cabinet about Jeremy Corbyn's leadership of our party. In particular, there is no confidence in our ability to win the next election, which may come much sooner than expected, if Jeremy continues as leader." Later in the morning, Heidi Alexander, the Shadow Secretary of State for Health, also resigned. Throughout the day, a further eight members of the shadow cabinet resigned.

Benn then supported Owen Smith in the failed attempt to replace Corbyn in the 2016 Labour Party leadership election.

=== Select committee chairman ===
In September 2016, Benn announced his intention to stand for chairman of the new Exiting the European Union Select Committee, a House of Commons select committee. He stated that his intention was to "get the best deal for the British people". His bid was supported by former Labour leader Ed Miliband, as well as other senior Labour Party figures including Angela Eagle, Dan Jarvis, and Andy Burnham. His opponent in the bid was Kate Hoey, a fellow Labour MP and a Leave vote supporter. The result, announced on 19 October, was 330 votes to Benn, and 209 to Hoey, so Benn became the new chairman.

At the snap 2017 general election, Benn was again re-elected with an increased vote share of 70.2% and an increased majority of 23,698.

In this position, he supported the European Union (Withdrawal) Act 2019 as proposed on a cross-party basis by Labour's Yvette Cooper and the Conservatives' Oliver Letwin to force the Government to ask for an extension of the Article 50 process.

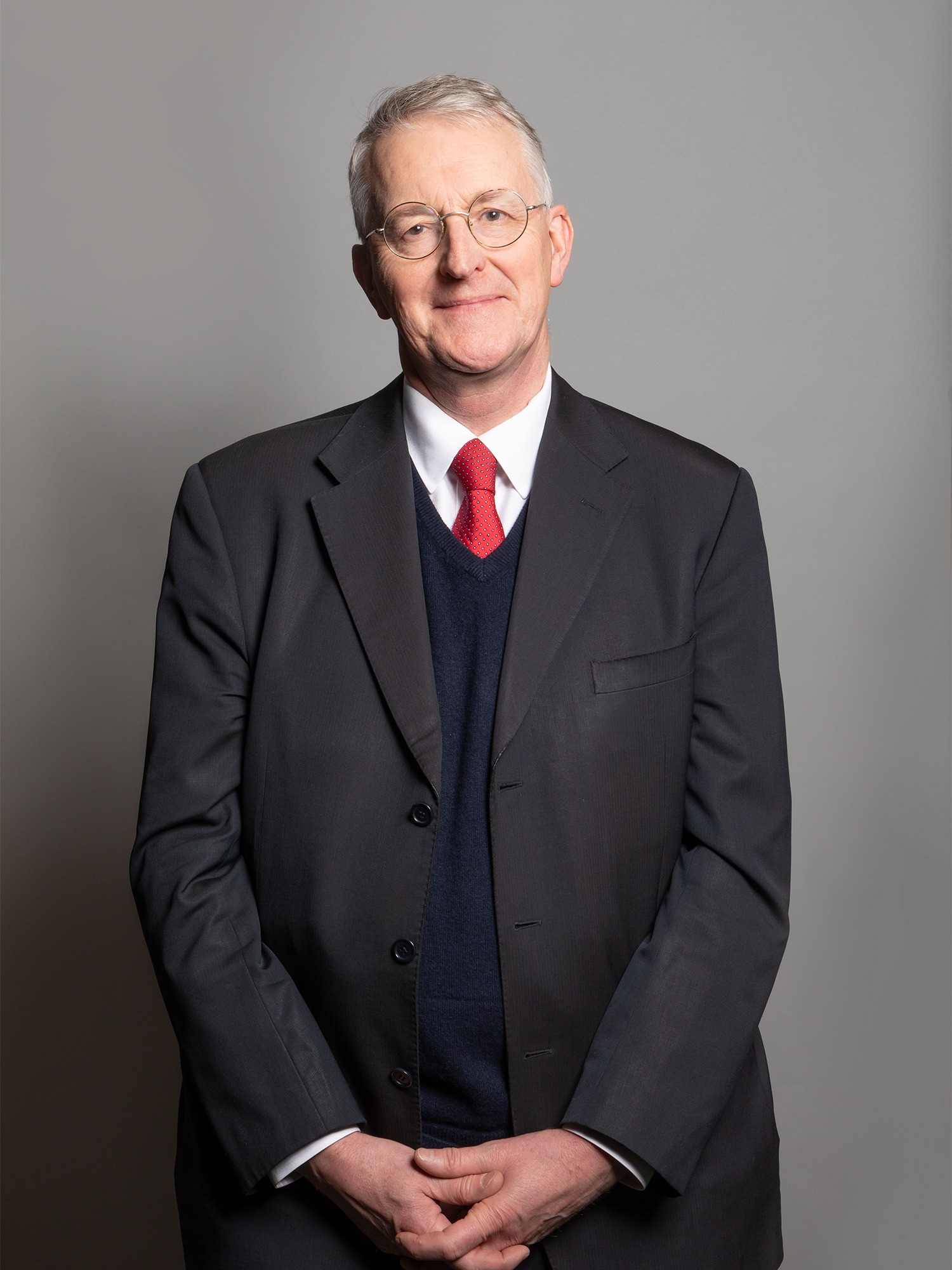
Official portrait, 2020

He sponsored the European Union (Withdrawal) (No. 2) Act 2019, consequently also known as the Benn Act, which received Royal assent on 9 September 2019, obliging the Prime Minister to seek a third extension had no agreement been reached at the subsequent European Council meeting in October 2019.

At the 2019 general election, Benn was again re-elected, with a decreased vote share of 61.7% and a decreased majority of 19,270.

=== Shadow Secretary of State for Northern Ireland ===
Following a reshuffle of the Shadow Cabinet on 4 September 2023, Benn rejoined the frontbench and was appointed Shadow Secretary of State for Northern Ireland.

Benn's appointment was welcomed by Doug Beattie, leader of the Ulster Unionist Party, who remarked that "the appointment of an individual with such an extensive political career is an indication of the importance the Labour Party leader places on Northern Ireland".

Due to the 2023 review of Westminster constituencies, Benn's constituency of Leeds Central was abolished, and replaced with Leeds South. In June 2024, Benn was selected as the Labour candidate for Leeds South at the 2024 general election.

=== Secretary of State for Northern Ireland ===
At the 2024 general election, Benn was elected to Parliament as MP for Leeds South with 54% of the vote and a majority of 11,279.

Following the Labour Party's landslide victory in the general election, Benn was appointed Secretary of State for Northern Ireland by Prime Minister Keir Starmer in formation of the new cabinet. He is one of two cabinet ministers (the other being Douglas Alexander) to serve under three Labour premiers.

In a joint letter with Secretary of State for Culture, Media and Sport Lisa Nandy, Benn confirmed to Stormont's Minister for Communities Gordon Lyons on 13 September 2024 that the government will not be providing funding for the redevelopment of Casement Park in time for the Euro 2028 football tournament. He later declined to state how much money the government might be willing to contribute towards the redevelopment.

Prior to Benn's speech at the Labour Party Conference on 23 September 2024, he announced in an interview that the new Independent Commission for Reconciliation and Information Recovery (ICRIR) investigating Troubles killings will not be scrapped. He also defended the government's decision to cut winter fuel payments for almost 250,000 pensioners in Northern Ireland, stating that "being in government is about making difficult choices" given the state of public finances.

In November 2024, Benn voted in favour of the Terminally Ill Adults (End of Life) Bill, which proposes to legalise assisted suicide.

Following the ascension of Andy Burnham to the Premiership in July 2026, Benn returned to the backbenches and was succeeded as Secretary of State for Northern Ireland by Chris Bryant.

== Personal life ==
In 1973, while at university, Benn married fellow student Rosalind Caroline Retey. She died of cancer, aged 26, in 1979. Benn subsequently married Sally Christina Clark in 1982, and the couple have four children.

Like his father, who died in March 2014, he is a teetotaller and vegetarian.

He is a member of the Fabian Society.

== Awards ==
Benn was shortlisted for the Grassroot Diplomat Initiative Award in 2015 for his work on increasing aid at DfID, and remains in the directory of the Grassroot Diplomat Who's Who publication.

Benn has won the Channel 4 Political Awards Politicians' Politician 2006, Spectator Parliamentarian of the Year 2016 and the Political Studies Association Parliamentarian of the Year 2019.

== Arms ==
Coat of arms of The Rt Hon. Hilary Benn, MP
Crest On a rock a spear erect proper, flowing therefrom a pennon azure, charged with the word "Onward", letters or. Escutcheon Argent, two barrulets indented gules, between in chief as many dragons' heads erased and in base a pencil and a pen in saltire proper, tied with a lace azure, pendent therefrom a torteau, charged with a figure "1914” or. Motto Deo Favente (By God's favour).

== Notes ==
Parliament of the United Kingdom
Preceded by Derek Fatchett	Member of Parliament for Leeds Central; 1999–2024	Constituency abolished
New constituency	Member of Parliament for Leeds South; 2024–present	Incumbent
Political offices
Preceded by The Baroness Amos	Secretary of State for International Development; 2003–2007	Succeeded by Douglas Alexander
Preceded by David Miliband	Secretary of State for Environment, Food and Rural Affairs; 2007–2010	Succeeded by Caroline Spelman
Preceded by Nick Herbert	Shadow Secretary of State for Environment, Food and Rural Affairs; 2010	Succeeded by Mary Creagh
Preceded by Rosie Winterton	Shadow Leader of the House of Commons; 2010–2011	Succeeded by Angela Eagle
Preceded by Caroline Flint	Shadow Secretary of State for Communities and Local Government; 2011–2015	Succeeded by Emma Reynolds
Preceded by Harriet Harman as Shadow Deputy Prime Minister of the United Kingdom	Shadow First Secretary of State; Acting; 2015	Succeeded by Angela Eagle
Preceded by Douglas Alexander	Shadow Foreign Secretary; 2015–2016	Succeeded by Emily Thornberry
Preceded by Chris Heaton-Harris	Secretary of State for Northern Ireland; 2024–2026	Succeeded by Chris Bryant
