= Arnold E. Bender =

British professor in nutrition and food toxicology (1918-1999)

Arnold Eric Bender (1918-1999) was a British expert in nutrition and food toxicology.

Bender worked as a Professor of Nutrition and Dietetics at Queen Elizabeth College. He was the president of the International Union of Food Science and Technology.

Among his notable works was The Facts of Food (1975), which was positively reviewed in the New Scientist as a "breathless tour of nutrition... unlikely to be matched for accuracy or density of information." He was also the author of the skeptical book Health or Hoax? (1986) which criticized the claims of alternative medicine and refuted many of the myths about "healthy eating".

== Publications ==
- Dictionary of Nutrition and Food Technology (1960)
- Dietetic Foods (1968)
- Nutrition and Dietetic Foods (1973)
- The Facts of Food (1975)
- Food Processing and Nutrition (1978)
- Health The Mitchell Beazley Pocket Guide to Nutrition and Calories (1987)
- Health or Hoax?: The Truth About Health Foods and Diets (Prometheus Books, 1986)
- Dictionary of Food and Nutrition (1995)
