= Sheffield Brightside =

Parliamentary constituency in the United Kingdom, 1885–2010

Coordinates: 53.409°N 1.444°W

Sheffield, Brightside
- Former borough constituency for the House of Commons
- Boundary of Sheffield, Brightside in South Yorkshire for the 2005 general election

- Location of South Yorkshire within England
- County: South Yorkshire

1885–2010
- Created from: Sheffield
- Replaced by: Sheffield Brightside and Hillsborough

Sheffield, Brightside was a parliamentary constituency in the City of Sheffield. Created for the 1885 general election, and replaced at the 2010 general election by the new constituency of Sheffield Brightside and Hillsborough, it elected one Member of Parliament (MP) to the House of Commons of the Parliament of the United Kingdom, using the first-past-the-post voting system.

In its first fifty years, Brightside returned a variety of Liberal, Conservative and Labour MPs. However, from 1945 onwards, it became one of the Labour Party's safest seats in the United Kingdom. It was represented by David Blunkett from 1987 until its abolition; he continued to hold the successor seat until he retired in 2015, becoming the seat's longest-serving MP.

== Boundaries ==
1885–1918: The Municipal Borough of Sheffield ward of Brightside.

1918–1950: The County Borough of Sheffield wards of Brightside and Burngreave.

1950–1955: The County Borough of Sheffield wards of Brightside, Firth Park, and Tinsley.

1955–1983: The County Borough of Sheffield wards of Brightside, Firth Park, Nether Shire, and Southey Green.

1983–2010: The City of Sheffield wards of Brightside, Firth Park, Nether Shire, Owlerton, and Southey Green.

Sheffield Brightside covered the north of the city. It bordered the constituencies of Rotherham, Sheffield Central, Sheffield Heeley and Sheffield Hillsborough.

Following their review of parliamentary representation in South Yorkshire, the Boundary Commission for England recommended that Sheffield Brightside should gain all of Burngreave and Hillsborough wards, with Walkley moving to Sheffield Central, and that the constituency be renamed Sheffield Brightside and Hillsborough.

== History ==
Sheffield Brightside was created in 1885 when the former Sheffield constituency was split into five constituencies.

== Members of Parliament ==
Election	Member	Party
1885	A. J. Mundella	Liberal
1897 by-election	Fred Maddison	Liberal
1900	James Hope	Conservative
1906	Tudor Walters	Liberal
1916	Tudor Walters	Coalition Liberal
Jan 1922	Tudor Walters	National Liberal
Nov 1922	Arthur Ponsonby	Labour
1930 by-election	Fred Marshall	Labour
1931	Hamer Russell	Conservative
1935	Fred Marshall	Labour
1950	Richard Winterbottom	Labour
1968 by-election	Edward Griffiths	Labour
Oct 1974	Joan Maynard	Labour
1987	David Blunkett	Labour
2010	constituency abolished	

== Elections ==
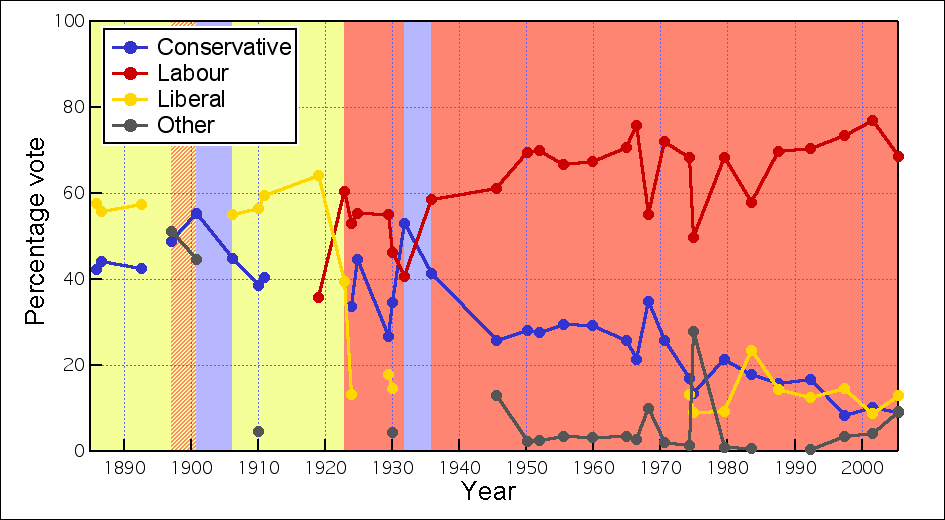
% poll by year

=== Elections in the 1880s ===
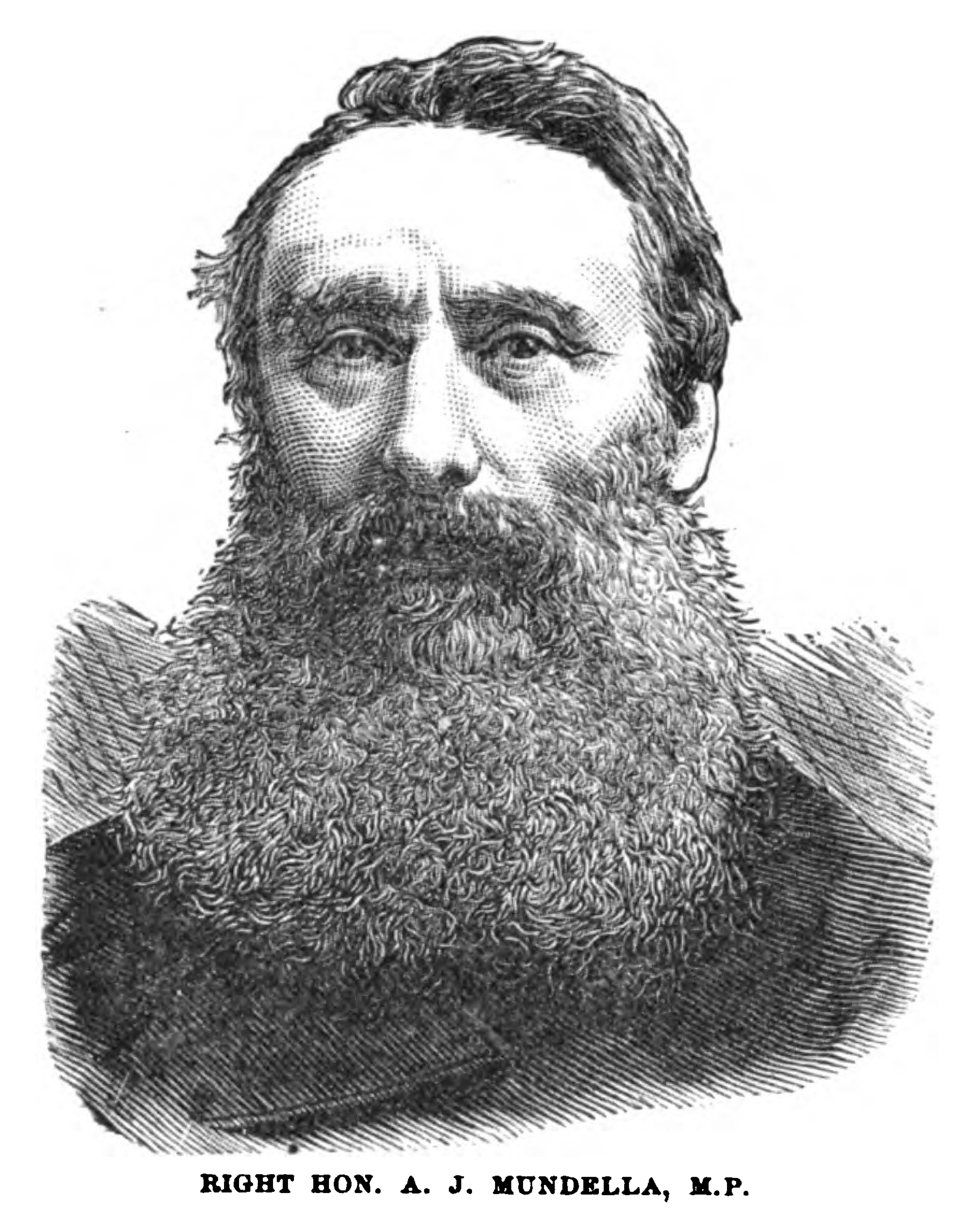

General election 1885: Sheffield Brightside
Party	Candidate	Votes	%
Liberal	A. J. Mundella	4,616	57.7
Conservative	Edmund Fitzalan-Howard	3,382	42.3
Majority		1,234	15.4
Turnout		7,998	86.0
Registered electors		9,298	
Liberal win (new seat)			

Mundella was appointed President of the Board of Trade, requiring a by-election.

By-election, 9 Feb 1886: Sheffield Brightside
Party	Candidate	Votes	%	±%
Liberal	A. J. Mundella	Unopposed		
Liberal hold				

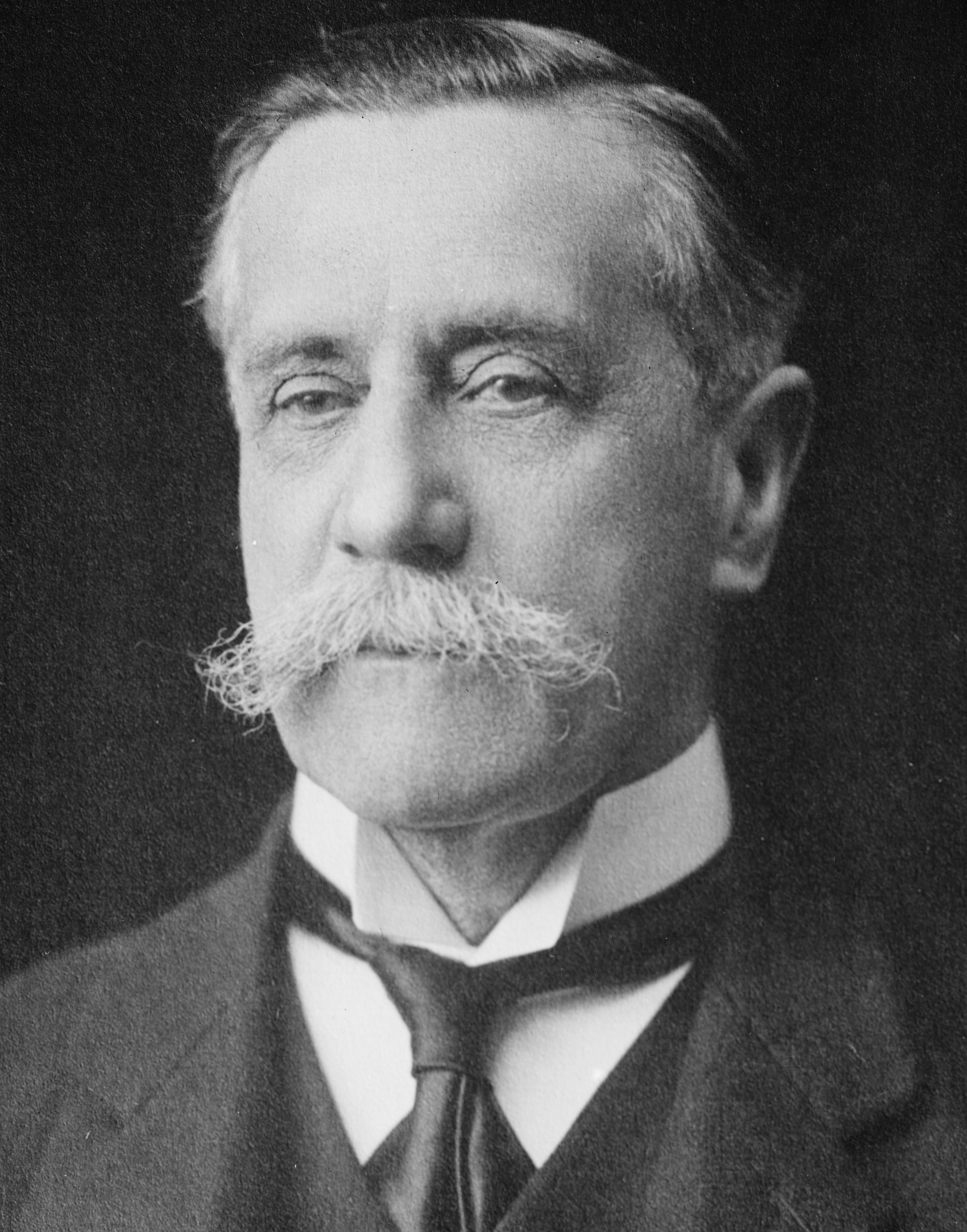
Lord E. Talbot

General election 1886: Sheffield Brightside
Party	Candidate	Votes	%	±%
Liberal	A. J. Mundella	4,280	55.7	−2.0
Conservative	Edmund Fitzalan-Howard	3,398	44.3	+2.0
Majority		882	11.4	−4.0
Turnout		7,678	82.6	−3.4
Registered electors		9,298		
Liberal hold		Swing	−2.0	

=== Elections in the 1890s ===
A.J. Mundella

General election 1892: Sheffield Brightside
Party	Candidate	Votes	%	±%
Liberal	A. J. Mundella	4,938	57.4	+1.7
Conservative	Bargrave Deane	3,661	42.6	−1.7
Majority		1,277	14.8	+3.4
Turnout		8,599	82.7	+0.1
Registered electors		10,400		
Liberal hold		Swing	+1.7	

Mundella was appointed President of the Board of Trade, requiring a by-election.

By-election, 23 Aug 1892: Sheffield Brightside
Party	Candidate	Votes	%	±%
Liberal	A. J. Mundella	Unopposed		
Liberal hold				

General election 1895: Sheffield Brightside
Party	Candidate	Votes	%	±%
Liberal	A. J. Mundella	Unopposed		
Liberal hold				

Mundella's death caused a by-election.

F. Maddison

1897 Sheffield Brightside by-election
Party	Candidate	Votes	%	±%
Lib-Lab	Frederick Maddison	4,289	51.1	N/A
Conservative	James Hope	4,106	48.9	New
Majority		183	2.2	N/A
Turnout		8,395	74.3	N/A
Registered electors		11,301		
Lib-Lab hold		Swing	N/A	

=== Elections in the 1900s ===
General election 1900: Sheffield Brightside
Party	Candidate	Votes	%	±%
Conservative	James Hope	4,992	55.3	N/A
Lib-Lab	Frederick Maddison	4,028	44.7	N/A
Majority		964	10.6	N/A
Turnout		9,020	77.1	N/A
Registered electors		11,700		
Conservative gain from Liberal		Swing	N/A	

General election 1906: Sheffield Brightside
Party	Candidate	Votes	%	±%
Liberal	Tudor Walters	5,409	55.1	+10.4
Conservative	James Hope	4,408	44.9	−10.4
Majority		1,001	10.2	N/A
Turnout		9,817	81.1	+4.0
Registered electors		12,108		
Liberal gain from Conservative		Swing	+10.4	

=== Elections in the 1910s ===
Walters

General election January 1910: Sheffield Brightside
Party	Candidate	Votes	%	±%
Liberal	Tudor Walters	6,156	56.6	+1.5
Conservative	Douglas Vickers	4,200	38.7	−6.2
Social Democratic Federation	Charles Lapworth	510	4.7	New
Majority		1,956	17.9	+7.7
Turnout		10,866	86.5	+5.4
Registered electors		12,564		
Liberal hold		Swing	+3.9	

General election December 1910: Sheffield Brightside
Party	Candidate	Votes	%	±%
Liberal	Tudor Walters	5,766	59.6	+3.0
Conservative	Douglas Vickers	3,902	40.4	+1.7
Majority		1,864	19.2	+1.3
Turnout		9,672	77.0	−9.5
Registered electors		12,564		
Liberal hold		Swing	+0.7	

General election 1918: Sheffield Brightside
Party		Candidate	Votes	%
C	National Liberal	Tudor Walters	12,164	64.2
	Labour	Richard Edward Jones	6,781	35.8
Majority			5,383	28.4
Turnout			18,945	52.0
Registered electors				
	National Liberal win (new boundaries)			
C indicates candidate endorsed by the coalition government.

=== Elections in the 1920s ===
Arthur Ponsonby

General election 1922: Sheffield Brightside
Party	Candidate	Votes	%	±%
Labour	Arthur Ponsonby	16,692	60.4	+24.6
National Liberal	Tudor Walters	10,949	39.6	−24.6
Majority		5,743	20.8	N/A
Turnout		27,641	75.0	+23.0
Registered electors				
Labour gain from National Liberal		Swing	+24.6	

General election 1923: Sheffield Brightside
Party	Candidate	Votes	%	±%
Labour	Arthur Ponsonby	14,741	53.0	−7.4
Unionist	Matthew Sheppard	9,408	33.8	New
Liberal	Thomas Illingworth Clough	3,684	13.2	−26.4
Majority		5,333	19.2	−1.6
Turnout		27,833	73.0	−2.0
Labour hold		Swing		

General election 1924: Sheffield Brightside
Party	Candidate	Votes	%	±%
Labour	Arthur Ponsonby	17,053	55.4	+2.4
Unionist	Matthew Sheppard	13,708	44.6	+10.8
Majority		3,345	10.8	−8.4
Turnout		30,761	78.9	+5.9
Labour hold		Swing		

General election 1929: Sheffield Brightside
Party	Candidate	Votes	%	±%
Labour	Arthur Ponsonby	20,277	55.2	−0.2
Unionist	R.I. Money	9,828	26.8	−17.8
Liberal	W.A.Lambert	6,612	18.0	New
Majority		10,449	28.4	+17.6
Turnout		36,717	77.3	−1.6
Labour hold		Swing		

=== Elections in the 1930s ===
1930 Sheffield Brightside by-election
Party	Candidate	Votes	%	±%
Labour	Fred Marshall	11,543	46.3	−8.9
Conservative	Hamer Russell	8,612	34.6	+7.8
Liberal	W.A. Lambert	3,650	14.7	−3.3
Communist	J. T. Murphy	1,084	4.4	New
Majority		2,931	11.7	−16.7
Turnout		24,889	52.0	−25.3
Labour hold		Swing		

General election 1931: Sheffield, Brightside
Party	Candidate	Votes	%	±%
Conservative	Hamer Russell	20,270	53.1	+26.3
Labour	Fred Marshall	15,528	40.6	−14.6
Communist	J. T. Murphy	1,571	4.1	N/A
New Party	E. C. Snelgrove	847	2.2	New
Majority		4,742	12.5	N/A
Turnout		38,216	79.6	+2.3
Conservative gain from Labour		Swing		

General election 1935: Sheffield, Brightside
Party	Candidate	Votes	%	±%
Labour	Fred Marshall	18,985	58.5	+17.9
Conservative	Hamer Russell	13,467	41.5	−11.6
Majority		5,518	17.0	N/A
Turnout		32,452	68.7	−10.9
Labour gain from Conservative		Swing		

=== Elections in the 1940s ===
General election 1945: Sheffield, Brightside
Party	Candidate	Votes	%	±%
Labour	Fred Marshall	19,373	61.2	+2.7
Conservative	Brian Taylor	8,177	25.8	−15.7
Communist	Howard Hill	4,115	13.0	New
Majority		11,196	35.4	+18.4
Turnout		31,665	75.5	+6.8
Labour hold		Swing		

=== Elections in the 1950s ===
General election 1950: Sheffield, Brightside
Party	Candidate	Votes	%	±%
Labour	Richard Winterbottom	32,542	69.6	+8.4
National Liberal	H. S. V. Smith	13,136	28.1	+2.3
Communist	Howard Hill	1,081	2.3	−11.7
Majority		19,406	41.5	+6.1
Turnout		46,759	84.6	+9.1
Labour hold		Swing		

General election 1951: Sheffield, Brightside
Party	Candidate	Votes	%	±%
Labour	Richard Winterbottom	31,519	69.9	+0.3
National Liberal	Alfred L Wood	12,433	27.6	−0.5
Communist	Howard Hill	1,116	2.5	+0.2
Majority		19,086	42.3	+0.8
Turnout		45,068	81.4	−3.2
Labour hold		Swing		

General election 1955: Sheffield, Brightside
Party	Candidate	Votes	%	±%
Labour	Richard Winterbottom	27,643	66.9	−3.0
National Liberal	Edward W Flynn	12,239	29.6	+2.0
Communist	Howard Hill	1,461	3.5	+1.0
Majority		15,404	37.3	−5.0
Turnout		41,343	71.1	−10.3
Labour hold		Swing		

General election 1959: Sheffield, Brightside
Party	Candidate	Votes	%	±%
Labour	Richard Winterbottom	28,302	67.5	+0.6
Conservative	Hugo Clifford Holmes	12,269	29.3	−0.3
Communist	Howard Hill	1,373	3.3	−0.2
Majority		16,033	38.2	+0.9
Turnout		41,944	73.5	+2.4
Labour hold		Swing		

=== Elections in the 1960s ===
General election 1964: Sheffield, Brightside
Party	Candidate	Votes	%	±%
Labour	Richard Winterbottom	27,317	70.7	+3.2
Conservative	Alexander Leitch	9,963	25.8	−3.5
Communist	Howard Hill	1,356	3.5	+0.2
Majority		17,354	44.9	+6.7
Turnout		29,669	70.3	−3.2
Labour hold		Swing		

General election 1966: Sheffield, Brightside
Party	Candidate	Votes	%	±%
Labour	Richard Winterbottom	26,653	75.9	+5.2
Conservative	Raymond Whitley Hadfield	7,476	21.3	−4.5
Communist	Howard Hill	989	2.8	−0.7
Majority		19,177	54.6	+9.7
Turnout		35,118	66.2	−4.1
Labour hold		Swing		

1968 Sheffield Brightside by-election
Party	Candidate	Votes	%	±%
Labour	Edward Griffiths	14,179	55.2	−20.7
Conservative	Colin Renfrew	8,931	34.8	+13.5
Communist	Robert Wilkinson	1,069	4.1	+1.3
Independent	Ronald Guest	918	3.6	New
Independent	H. L. Lambert	586	2.3	New
Majority		5,248	20.4	−34.2
Turnout		25,683		
Labour hold		Swing		

=== Elections in the 1970s ===
General election 1970: Sheffield, Brightside
Party	Candidate	Votes	%	±%
Labour	Edward Griffiths	23,941	72.2	−3.7
Conservative	Tony Newton	8,572	25.8	+4.5
Communist	Gordon Ashberry	665	2.0	−0.8
Majority		15,369	46.4	−8.2
Turnout		33,178	62.0	−4.2
Labour hold		Swing		

General election February 1974: Sheffield, Brightside
Party	Candidate	Votes	%	±%
Labour	Edward Griffiths	27,363	68.4	−3.8
Conservative	John Smith	6,796	17.0	−8.8
Liberal	Thomas Blades	5,347	13.4	New
Communist	Violet Gill	513	1.3	−0.7
Majority		20,567	51.4	+5.0
Turnout		40,019	74.5	+12.5
Labour hold		Swing		

General election October 1974: Sheffield, Brightside
Party	Candidate	Votes	%	±%
Labour	Joan Maynard	18,108	49.7	−18.7
Independent Labour	Edward Griffiths	10,182	27.9	New
Conservative	Roy Walker	4,905	13.5	–3.5
Liberal	Thomas Blades	3,271	9.0	−4.4
Majority		7,926	21.8	−29.6
Turnout		36,466	67.4	−7.1
Labour hold		Swing		

General election 1979: Sheffield, Brightside
Party	Candidate	Votes	%	±%
Labour	Joan Maynard	25,672	68.5	+18.8
Conservative	Betty Knightly	7,979	21.2	+7.7
Liberal	Malcolm Johnson	3,482	9.3	+0.3
National Front	K. T. Brack	354	0.9	New
Majority		17,693	47.3	+25.5
Turnout		37,487	68.8	+1.4
Labour hold		Swing		

=== Elections in the 1980s ===
General election 1983: Sheffield, Brightside
Party	Candidate	Votes	%	±%
Labour	Joan Maynard	25,531	58.0	−10.5
Liberal	Francis Butler	10,322	23.4	+14.1
Conservative	David Grayson	7,888	17.9	−3.3
National Front	P. A. Spinks	286	0.7	−0.2
Majority		15,209	34.5	−14.8
Turnout		44,037	65.5	−3.3
Labour hold		Swing		

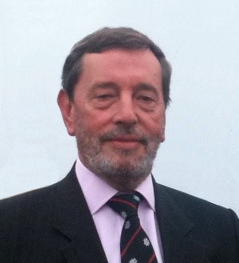
David Blunkett

General election 1987: Sheffield, Brightside
Party	Candidate	Votes	%	±%
Labour	David Blunkett	31,208	69.9	+11.9
Conservative	Mary Glyn	7,017	15.7	−2.2
Liberal	John Leeman	6,434	14.4	−9.0
Majority		24,191	54.2	+19.7
Turnout		44,659	68.7	+3.2
Labour hold		Swing		

=== Elections in the 1990s ===
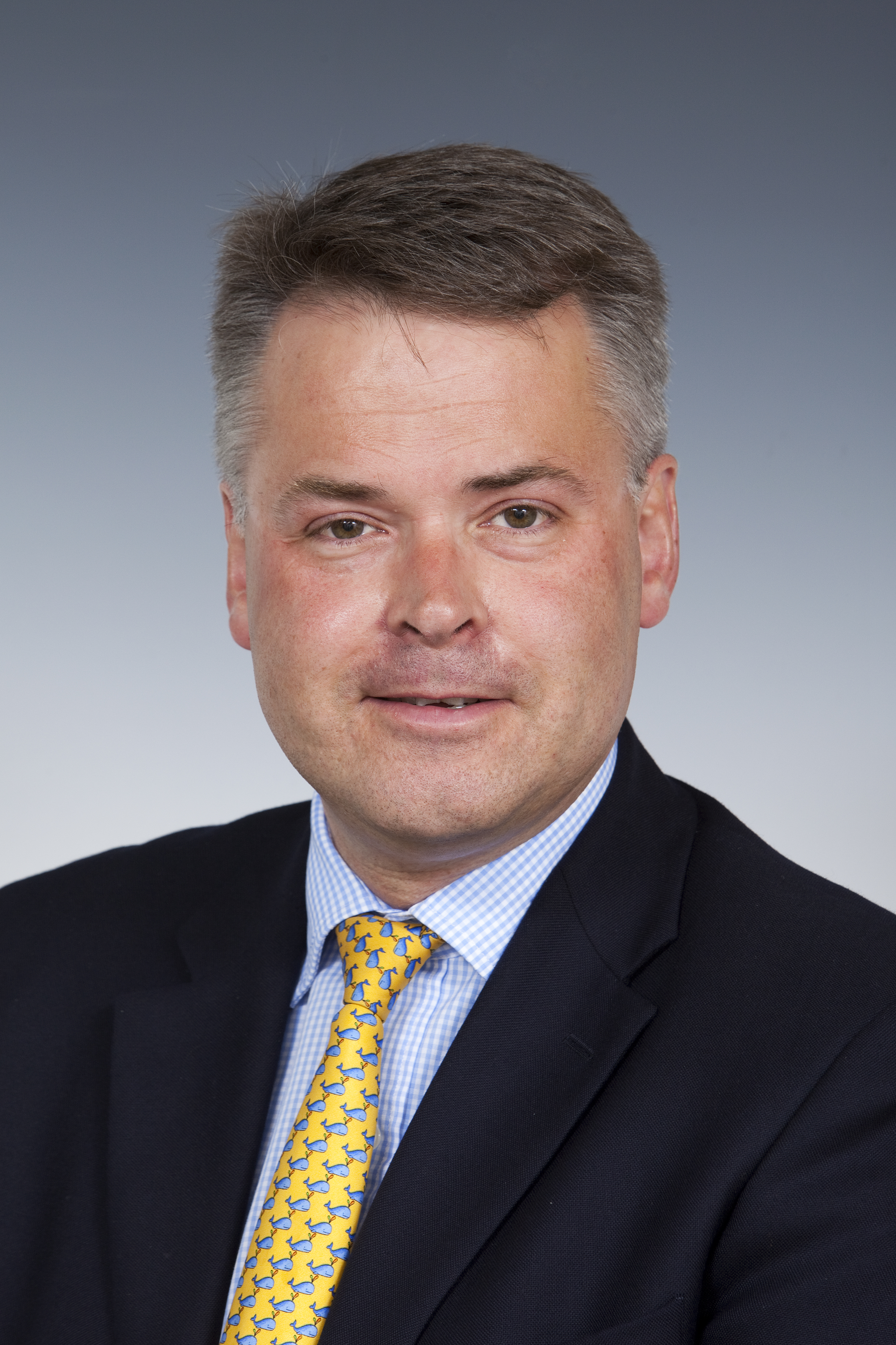
Tim Loughton

General election 1992: Sheffield, Brightside
Party	Candidate	Votes	%	±%
Labour	David Blunkett	29,771	70.4	+0.5
Conservative	Tim Loughton	7,090	16.8	+1.1
Liberal Democrats	Richard Franklin	5,273	12.5	−1.9
International Communist	David Hyland	150	0.4	New
Majority		22,681	53.7	−0.5
Turnout		42,224	66.3	−2.4
Labour hold		Swing		

General election 1997: Sheffield, Brightside
Party	Candidate	Votes	%	±%
Labour	David Blunkett	24,901	73.5	+3.1
Liberal Democrats	Francis Butler	4,947	14.6	+2.1
Conservative	Christopher Buckwell	2,850	8.4	−8.4
Referendum	Brian Farnsworth	624	1.8	New
Socialist Labour	Paul Davidson	482	1.4	New
Natural Law	Richard Scott	61	0.2	New
Majority		19,954	58.9	+5.2
Turnout		33,865	57.5	−8.8
Labour hold		Swing		

=== Elections in the 2000s ===
General election 2001: Sheffield, Brightside
Party	Candidate	Votes	%	±%
Labour	David Blunkett	19,650	76.9	+3.4
Conservative	Matthew Wilson	2,601	10.2	+1.8
Liberal Democrats	Alison Firth	2,238	8.8	−5.8
Socialist Alliance	Brian Wilson	361	1.4	New
Socialist Labour	Robert Morris	354	1.4	New
UKIP	Anthony Suter	348	1.4	New
Majority		17,049	66.7	+7.8
Turnout		25,552	47.2	−10.3
Labour hold		Swing		

General election 2005: Sheffield, Brightside
Party	Candidate	Votes	%	±%
Labour	David Blunkett	16,876	68.5	−8.4
Liberal Democrats	Jonathan Harston	3,232	13.1	+4.3
Conservative	Tim Clark	2,205	9.0	−1.2
BNP	Christopher Hartigan	1,537	6.2	New
UKIP	Judith Clarke	779	3.2	+1.8
Majority		13,644	55.4	−11.3
Turnout		24,629	48.5	+1.3
Labour hold		Swing	−6.4	

== See also ==
- List of parliamentary constituencies in South Yorkshire

== Sources ==
- Sheffield Brightside BBC News, Election 2005
- Sheffield Brightside BBC News, Vote 2001
- Election history – Sheffield Brightside The Guardian
- Leigh Rayment's Historical List of MPs – Constituencies beginning with "B" (part 5)
- Political Science Resources Election results from 1951 to present
- F. W. S. Craig, British Parliamentary Election Results 1918 – 1949
- F. W. S. Craig, British Parliamentary Election Results 1950 – 1970
- Sheffield General Election Results 1945 – 2001, Sheffield City Council
