= Sheffield Brightside by-election =

Sheffield Brightside by-election may refer to:

- 1886 Sheffield Brightside by-election
- 1897 Sheffield Brightside by-election
- 1930 Sheffield Brightside by-election
- 1968 Sheffield Brightside by-election
- 2016 Sheffield Brightside and Hillsborough by-election
