= Andrew Danson =

English cricketer

Andy Danson
Personal information
- Full name: Andrew Richard Danson
- Born: 25 October 1978 (age 48); Sheffield, Yorkshire, England
- Batting: Right-handed
- Bowling: Right-arm medium

Domestic team information
- Years: Team
- 1999–2000: Cambridge University

Career statistics
Competition	First-class
Matches	12
Runs scored	364
Batting average	28.00
100s/50s	1/0
Top score	117*
Balls bowled	711
Wickets	8
Bowling average	48.00
5 wickets in innings	0
10 wickets in match	0
Best bowling	3/20
Catches/stumpings	6/–
- Source: Cricinfo, 31 December 2021

Andrew Richard Danson (born 25 October 1978) is an English former first-class cricketer.

Danson was born at the Nether Edge Hospital in Sheffield in October 1978. He was educated at Birkdale School, before going up to Pembroke College, Cambridge. While studying at Cambridge, he played first-class cricket for Cambridge University Cricket Club in 1999 and 2000, making twelve appearances. Playing as an all-rounder, he scored 364 runs in his twelve matches, at an average of 28.00. He scored one century, a score of 117 not out against Derbyshire at Fenner's in 2000. With his medium pace bowling, he took 8 wickets with best figures of 3 for 20.

After graduating from Cambridge, Danson became a lawyer. As of 2022 he works with the law firm Bird & Bird, specialising in law on sports and gambling.
