= 1908 Sheffield Central by-election =

UK Parliamentary by-election

The 1908 Sheffield Central by-election was held on 21 April 1908. The by-election was held due to the death of the incumbent Conservative MP, Howard Vincent. It was won by the Conservative candidate James Hope. He was unopposed.
