= Alfred James Bailey =

British politician

Alfred James Bailey

Alfred James Bailey (1868 – 1948), was a British Trade Unionist and Liberal Party politician, serving as Lord Mayor of Sheffield.

== Early life and trade unionism ==
Bailey was born in Scredington in Lincolnshire in 1868.

Bailey was Secretary of the Yorkshire branch of the National Amalgamated Union of Labour, and from 1896 served as one of its official delegates. He also represented his union at the Trades Union Congress. In 1924 following the merger of a number of trade unions he became a district secretary of the National Union of General and Municipal Workers.

== Political career ==
Bailey was elected to Sheffield City Council as a Liberal in 1904 to represent Darnall Ward. He was re-elected in 1907 defeating the Labour Party candidate, Joseph Pointer. He was Liberal candidate for the Central division of Sheffield at both 1910 General Elections, sponsored by the Sheffield Federated Trades Council. His union gave permission for the candidacy, but no financial backing. Sheffield Central was a safe Conservative seat. At the first election in January he increased the Liberal vote share by 3.5% against the national trend. He narrowed the gap further in the December election, to just 184 votes. He was an Independent Labour candidate for Sheffield Central at the 1918 General Election, sponsored by his union. At this election he saw his share of the vote fall and he again finished second. He did not stand for parliament again.

He continued to be elected to Sheffield City Council until 1923 when he was appointed as an Alderman. After the Great War he identified with the 'Citizen's Party' against the Labour Party. He served as Lord Mayor of Sheffield from 1924 to 1925.

=== Electoral record ===
General Election January 1910: Sheffield Central
Party	Candidate	Votes	%	±%
Conservative	James Hope	3,829	52.7	−3.5
Lib-Lab	Alfred James Bailey	3,440	47.3	+3.5
Majority		389	5.4	−7.0
Turnout		7,269	83.7	+1.6
Registered electors		8,684		
Conservative hold		Swing	−3.5	

General Election December 1910: Sheffield Central
Party	Candidate	Votes	%	±%
Conservative	James Hope	3,455	51.4	−1.3
Lib-Lab	Alfred James Bailey	3,271	48.6	+1.3
Majority		184	2.8	−2.6
Turnout		6,726	77.5	−6.2
Registered electors		8,684		
Conservative hold		Swing	−1.3	

General Election 1918: Sheffield Central
Party		Candidate	Votes	%	±%
C	Unionist	James Hope	9,361	58.7	+7.3
	Independent Labour	Alfred James Bailey	5,959	37.3	−11.3
	British Socialist Party	Robert George Murray	643	4.0	n/a
Majority			3,402	21.4	+18.6
Turnout			15,963	43.1	−34.4
	Unionist hold		Swing	+9.3	
C indicates candidate endorsed by the coalition government.

Trade union offices
Preceded by New position	Sheffield District Secretary of the National Union of General and Municipal Workers; 1924–1937	Succeeded by J. D. S. Highman as Yorkshire District Secretary
