= Stanley Udale =

Stanley Udale (1856 – October 1930) was a British political activist.

Born in Cornwall, Udale was educated at Penzance Grammar School. He was orphaned as a child, and moved to London when he was fifteen. He was inspired by Charles Bradlaugh to take up radical causes.

Udale moved to Lincoln early in the 1880s, where he set up a clothing business. He joined the Lincoln Fabian Society, and was elected to the executive of the city's Liberal Party. He organised the construction of a Liberal Working Men's Club, and in 1893 was elected as a Guardian. That year, he was also elected to Lincoln City Council, describing himself as a Liberal-Labour candidate. He was also a founder of the Lincoln Leader weekly newspaper.

In 1903, Udale became the secretary of the Free Trade Union, and he stood for the Liberal Party in Sheffield Central at the 1906 United Kingdom general election, taking second place with 43.8% of the vote. He later joined the Labour Party. From 1922, he served on the executive of the English League for the Taxation of Land Values.
