= Chelsea Park (Sheffield) =

Park in South Yorkshire, England

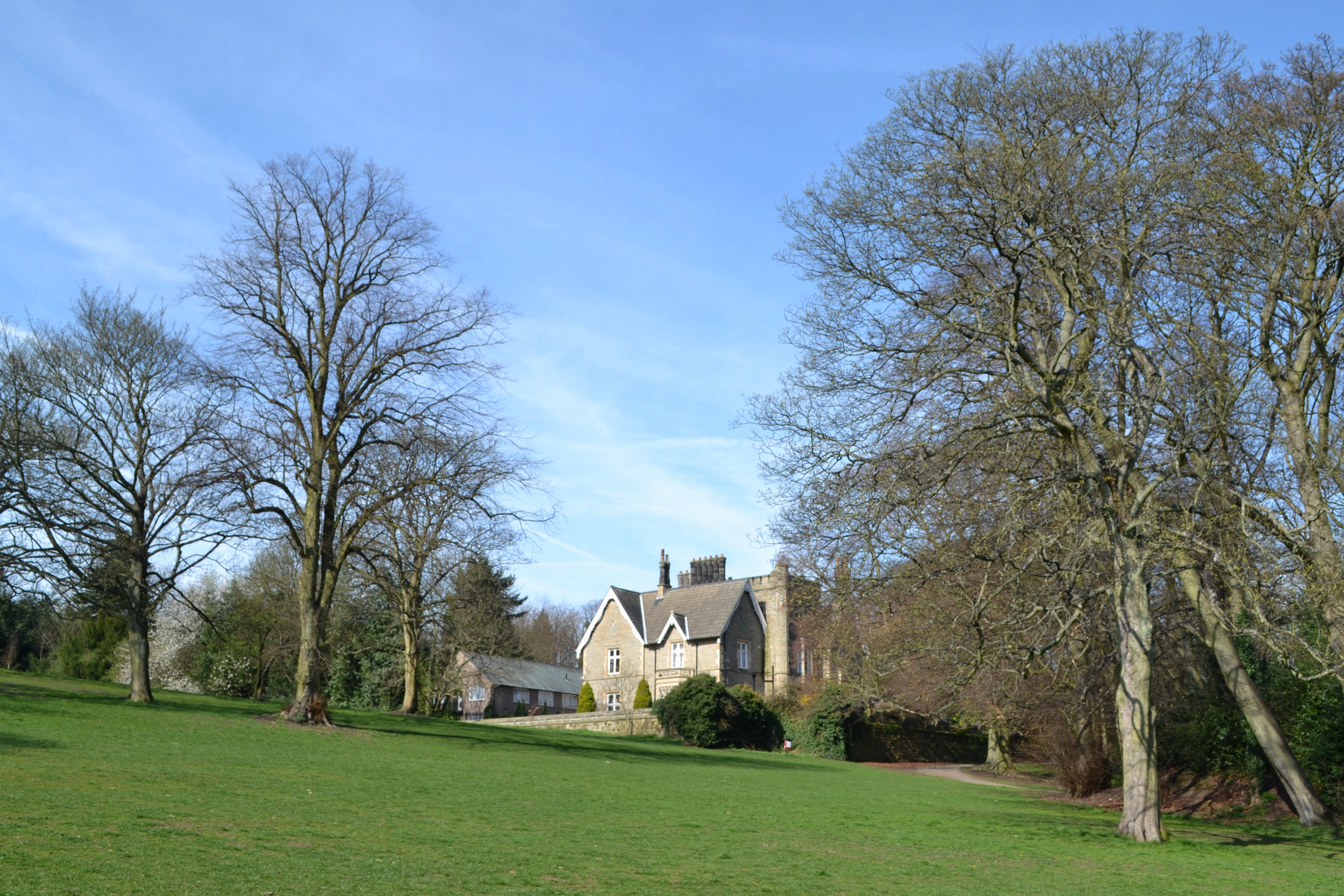
- View towards Brincliffe Towers
- Interactive map of Chelsea Park
- Type: Public park
- Location: Brincliffe, Sheffield
- Coordinates: 53.3585°N 1.5010°W
- Created: 1935
- Status: All year

Chelsea Park is a small public park located in the south west of Sheffield in the suburb of Brincliffe, between Nether Edge and Ecclesall. It is listed as one of the city's Historic Parks, and was originally laid out as the private gardens to Brincliffe Towers in 1852. It was given to the people of Sheffield in 1925 by a former Lord Mayor and Alderman Dr Robert Styring.

The original small playground from 1966 was replaced, alongside a canopy and basketball area, in 2005.
