= Hull Trades Council =

The Hull and District Trades Union Council brings together trade unions based in and around Kingston-upon-Hull, in England.

== History ==
The first mention of a trades council in Hull was in 1867, and further reference to it appear in the local press in the 1870s. In late 1881, the council was reorganised, and it is this date which the organisation has since regarded as its foundation. From the start, unions of dockers and sailors were strongly represented on the council, in contrast to most other towns, where craft unions dominated trades councils.

During the early 1880s, the council gradually grew in strength, supporting workers in disputes around the docks, while also campaigning for the establishment of a free library in the town, and for better schools for working-class children. In 1886, the trades council passed a resolution permitting political discussions, and it focused increasingly on securing the election of workers to the town council. That year, it hosted the Trades Union Congress (TUC) in the town, and trades council president Fred Maddison was elected as President of the TUC. Maddison won a seat on the town council in 1887, but left the town two years later. In 1891, three trades council-backed candidates won seats as Liberal-Labour candidates.

The council grew from 5,000 members in 1889 to 20,000 in 1891, with membership among dockers booming as the union secured a closed shop agreement. The Shipping Federation opposed the agreement, and ended it in 1893, locking out all workers who held union membership. The trades council raised money nationally to support the dockers, but they were defeated, and the council much weakened by this.

The Hull Building Trades Council, which was founded in 1891, came to dominate the council, and its membership rebounded. By 1898, it claimed to be the second-largest trades council in the UK, and to have the largest number of representatives on local public bodies. The new Independent Labour Party (ILP) failed to win over many supporters, and from 1898 the trades council formed an alliance with the local Liberal Party, the "Progressive Party". This was dissolved in 1905, and ILP members won the leading positions on the trades council.

From 1905, the trades council increased its activity. That year, it organised a "Right to Work" demonstration, it began holding large May Day demonstrations, and in 1909 it affiliated to the National Campaign to Promote the Break-Up of the Poor Law. However, when major strikes took place in the city in 1911, the trades council's only role was in raising funds to support the strikers. Revolutionaries became prominent on the council over the next few years, but the council lost prominence as the local Labour Party took over most of its political activities, and at the start of World War I, the council agreed to support "social peace" until the conflict ended.

== Presidents ==
1882: J. Ambler
1883: C. N. Mullineaux
1884: W. J. Strachan
1886: Fred Maddison
1889: W. G. Millington
1899: Fred Booth
1901: Thomas George Hall
1906: Patrick Flanagan
1914: Fred Booth
1916: William Duggleby
1917: George Clark
1918: J. Cavanagh
1921: George Clark
1923: Isaac Robinson
1927: George Clark
1929: L. Ralph
1931: F. Walker
1937: C. E. Wilson
