= Fred Marshall (British politician) =

British politician (1883–1962)

Fred Marshall (10 March 1883 – 1 November 1962) was a British politician.

Born in South Anston, Yorkshire, Marshall, a wagon builder by trade, was elected as a Labour Party member of Sheffield City Council in 1919, serving as Lord Mayor of Sheffield in 1933/4.

He entered Parliament by winning the 1930 Sheffield Brightside by-election, but lost the seat at the following year's general election.

Marshall was re-elected, again for Sheffield Brightside, at the 1935 general election. He was also elected as Chairman of the National Union of General and Municipal Workers, and from 1945 until 1947, served as the Parliamentary Secretary to the Minister of Town and Country Planning. Marshall stood down from Parliament in 1950.

Parliament of the United Kingdom
Preceded by Arthur Ponsonby	Member of Parliament for Sheffield Brightside; 1930–1931	Succeeded by Hamer Russell
Preceded by Hamer Russell	Member of Parliament for Sheffield Brightside; 1935–1950	Succeeded by Richard Winterbottom
Political offices
Preceded by Ronald Tree	Parliamentary Secretary to the Minister of Town and Country Planning; 1945–1947	Succeeded by Evelyn King
Trade union offices
Preceded by J. R. Clynes as President	Chair of the Executive of the National Union of General and Municipal Workers; 1938–1945	Succeeded by Thomas William Kerry
