= Nether Edge and Sharrow (ward) =

Electoral ward in Sheffield, England

Coordinates: 53.355°N 1.483°W

- Shown within Sheffield
- Area: 1.31 sq mi (3.4 km^{2})
- Population: 18,890 (2011 census)
  - Density: 14,420/sq mi (5,570/km^{2})
- Metropolitan borough: City of Sheffield
- Metropolitan county: South Yorkshire
- Region: Yorkshire and the Humber
- Country: England
- Sovereign state: United Kingdom
- UK Parliament: Sheffield Central
- Councillors: Ibby Ullah (Labour); Nighat Basharat (Labour); Maroof Raouf (Green)

Nether Edge and Sharrow Ward, which includes the districts of Nether Edge, Sharrow, Abbeydale, Brincliffe and parts of Banner Cross, Heeley and Highfield, is one of the 28 electoral wards in the City of Sheffield, England. It is located in the south west of the city and covers an area of 1.31 square miles (3.4 km^{2}). In 2011, the population of this ward was 18,890 people in 7,592 households. Nether Edge & Sharrow ward is one of the wards that make up the Sheffield Central parliamentary constituency.

== History ==
Before the 19th century, the area that is now Nether Edge was largely rural and part of Ecclesall Bierlow, the only clusters of cottages being the small medieval hamlet of Cherry Tree Hill and a small hamlet at Machon Bank. Much of the development of the area was undertaken by George Wostenholm, a local cutler who from 1836 onward purchased a large area of land east of Brincliffe Edge.

Wostenholm's home, Kenwood House, and the surrounding park (now the Kenwood Hall Hotel) took up a large portion of the land, the garden designer, Robert Marnock laid out the surrounding roads as a series of curving avenues and the remaining land sold off for development. As a result, many of the homes in the area are spacious Victorian houses that were owned by local cutlers and businessmen.

The Poor Law Amendment Act 1834 (PLAA) allowed parishes to form unions, jointly responsible for the administration and funding of Poor Law in their area. By 1831 the population of the area had increased considerably and in 1837 the ‘Ecclesall Bierlow Poor Law Union’ (PLD or Poor Law District) was founded and Ecclesall Bierlow Union Workhouse, Cherry Tree Hill, Nether Edge was built. In 1929 the workhouse was renamed Nether Edge Hospital housing a Gynaecology Unit established to serve the whole of Sheffield.

== Districts of Nether Edge and Sharrow ward ==
=== Nether Edge ===
Nether Edge (grid reference SK342851) is an established residential suburb in the southwest of the City of Sheffield, England.

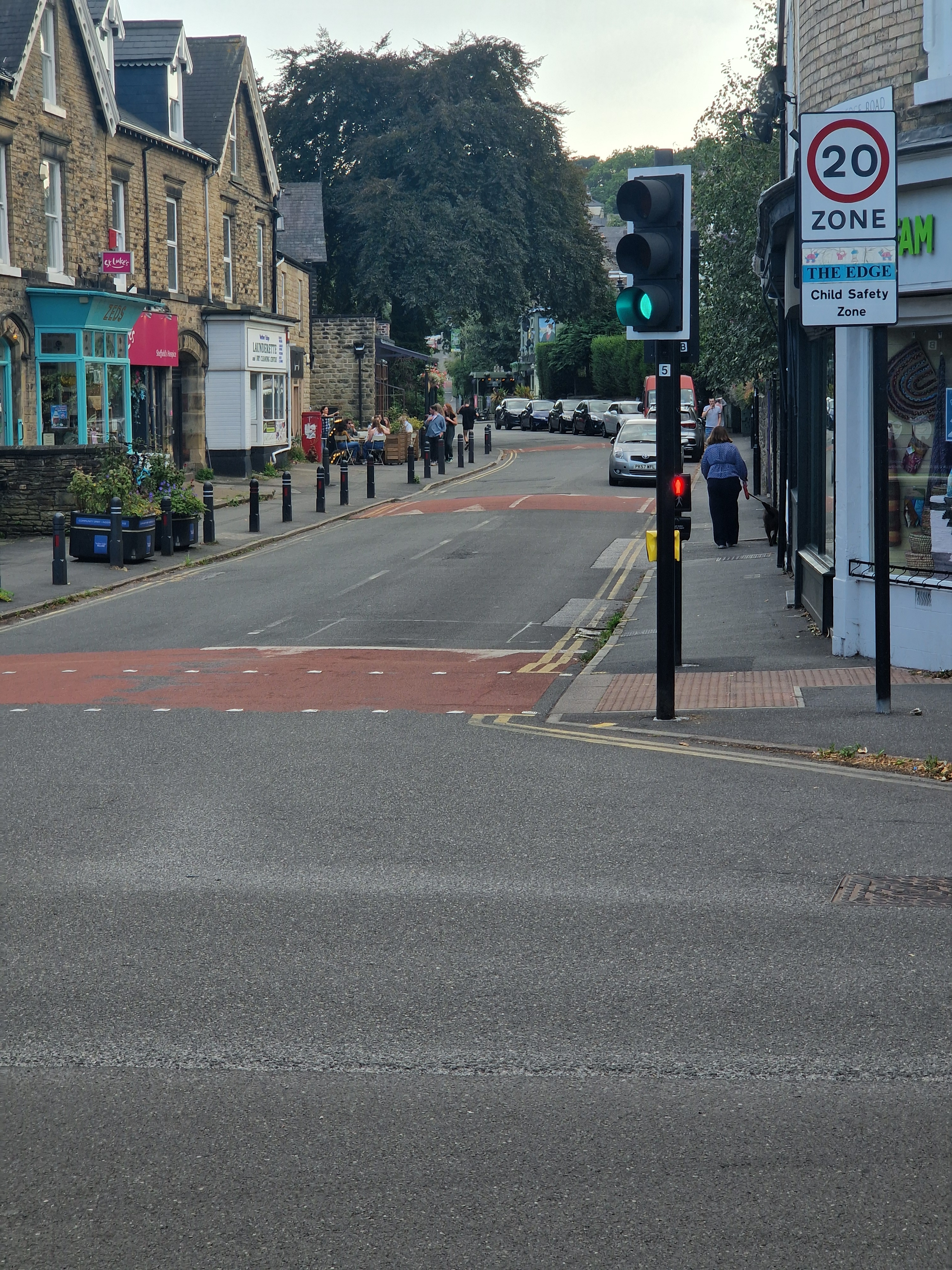
Nether Edge Road

Local facilities include a small shopping area at the junction of Nether Edge Road and Machon Bank Road, featuring a cafe, arts and crafts shops, a dentist, organic fruit and vegetable shop, a local baker, delicatessen / cafes, barber and hairdresser shops, a local mini-market and a supermarket. Two small theatres (the Merlin and the Lantern) also exist in the area. A farmers market selling local food produce and craft goods is held four times a year in the central area on dates roughly coinciding with the equinoxes and solstice dates.

==== Brincliffe ====
Brincliffe grid reference SK333849 is a small neighbourhood located to the North west of Nether Edge. It is characterised by large Victorian and Edwardian villas and low-density housing.

The Sheffield Polytechnic Art College was in Brincliffe, on Psalter Lane.

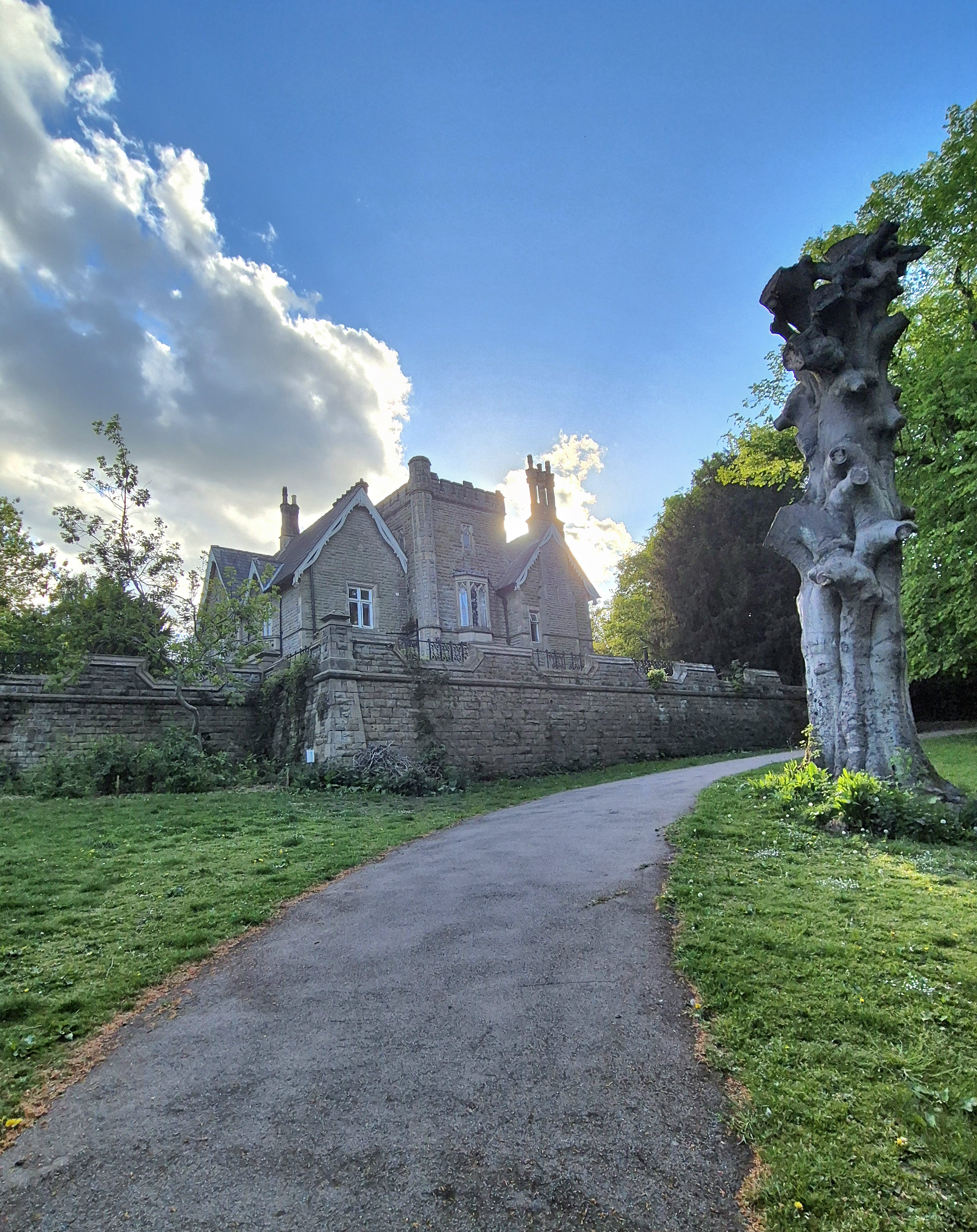
Chelsea Park, Brincliffe

Chelsea Park, and nearby Brincliffe Edge Woods are also in this area that lies between Nether Edge and Ecclesall.

=== Banner Cross ===
Banner Cross is a neighbourhood of Ecclesall centred on the intersection of Ecclesall Road and Psalter Lane. Banner Cross is split evenly between Nether Edge & Sharrow ward and Ecclesall Ward.

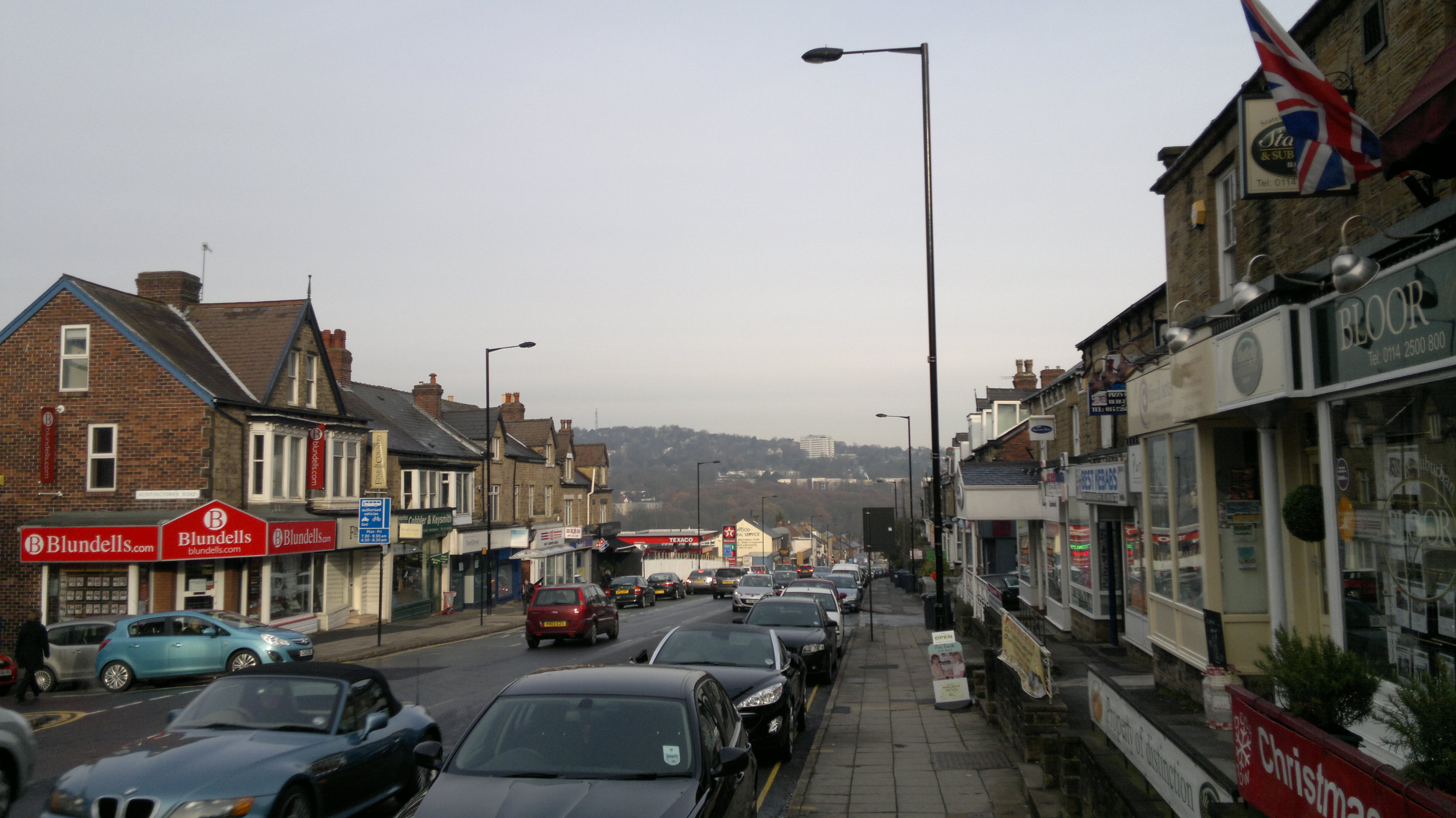
Ecclesall Road at Banner Cross

Banner Cross Hall, an ancient esquire seat, was virtually rebuilt in 1820. The main place of worship is Banner Cross Methodist Church. The nearby Banner Cross pub gained infamy when the notorious criminal Charles Peace shot and killed Arthur Dyson in the passageway beside the pub on 29 November 1876. The base of an old stone cross still remained at Banner Cross in 1819. Addy (1888) suggested that the name derives from bæna kross, meaning the cross of prayers.

=== Sharrow ===
Sharrow historically was situated within the old Ecclesall Bierlow, on the old turnpike road between Sheffield and the Pennines towards Chapel en le Frith and Manchester.

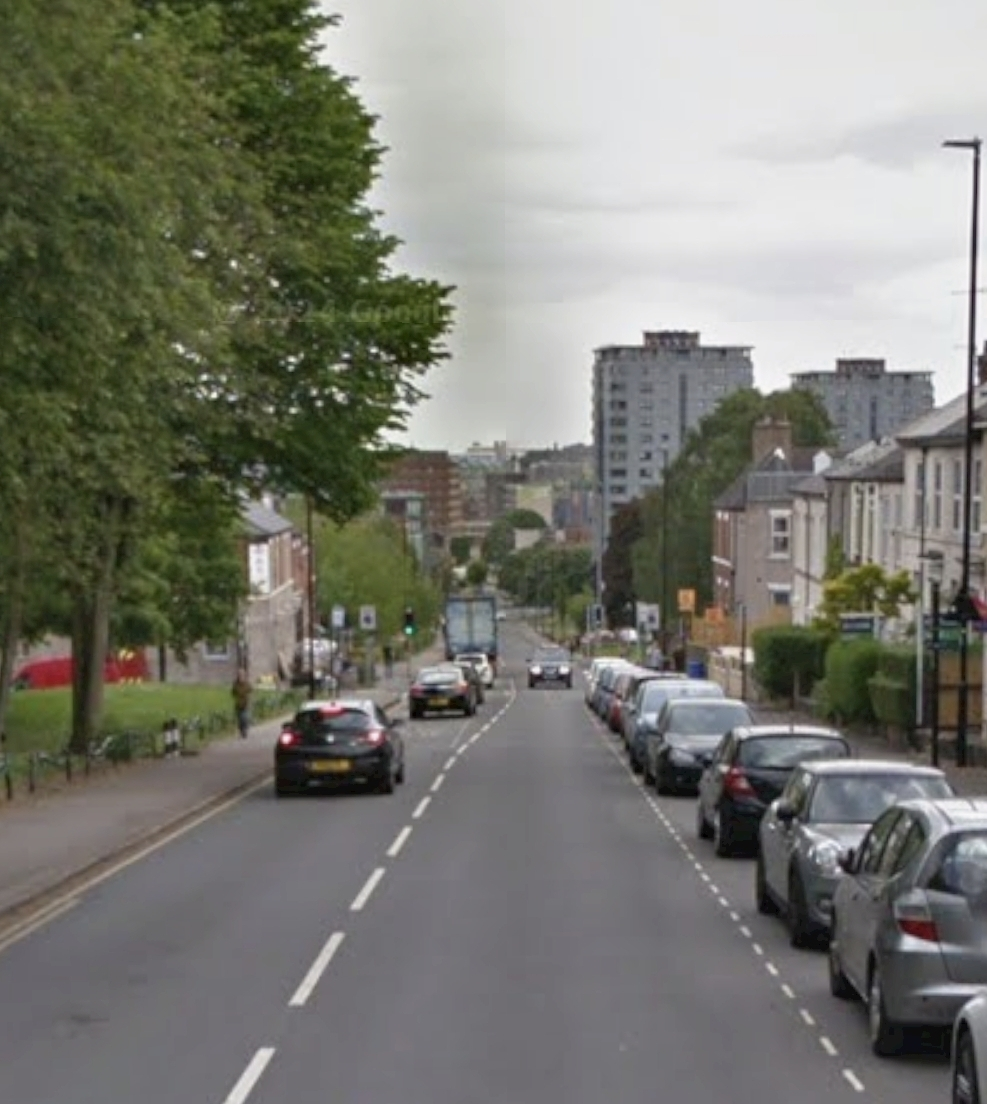
Cemetery Road, Sharrow

In the modern-era Sharrow is now largely a built up urban inner city area, located directly southwest of Sheffield city centre. Sharrow was urbanized between 1830 and 1850 when Little Sheffield, a village and adjunct to the main town of Sheffield was redeveloped to cope with the rapidly increasing growth in population. Separated from Sheffield town by the "uninhabited, barren, gorse-covered, Sheffield Moor".

==== Abbeydale ====
Abbeydale is the area of, and streets around Abbeydale Road, and extends from Sharrow up to Archer Road.

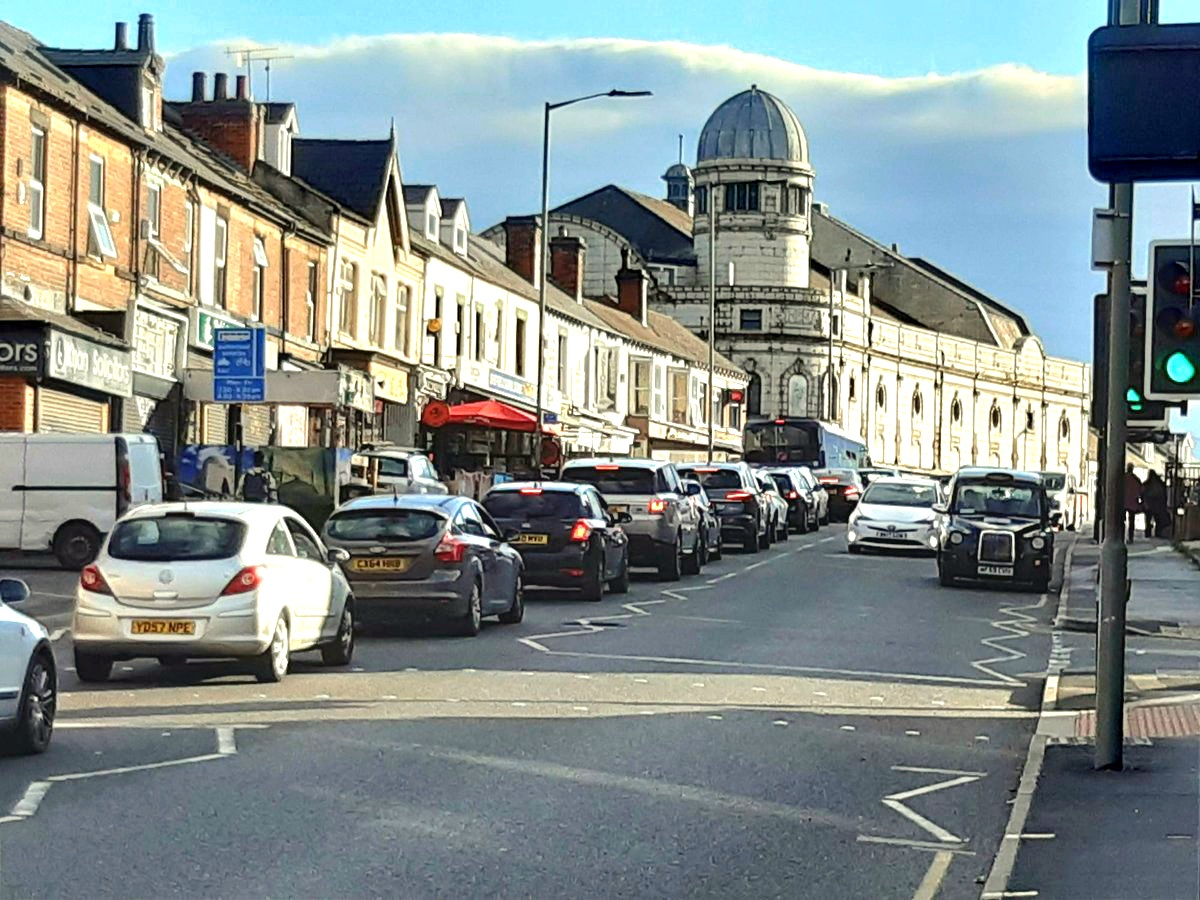
Abbeydale, Sheffield

The main shopping district lies between Heeley, Sharrow and Nether Edge. The Abbeydale Picture House, Abbeydale School, Mother of God RC Church, The Broadfield P.H., Carter Knowle Surgery are within this area.
