= T. R. Threlfall =

British trade unionist and politician

Thomas Robert Threlfall (6 October 1852 – fl.1932), known as T. R. Threlfall, was a British trade unionist and Liberal-Labour politician.

Threlfall was elected as a member of the Southport Town Council, and as President of Southport Trades Council. He was also active in the Typographical Association, and championed the idea of working men standing for election to Parliament. In 1885, he persuaded the Association to sponsor two candidates: Frederick Maddison, and Threlfall himself, who stood for the Liberal Party at the 1886 general election in Sheffield Hallam.

In 1885, the Trades Union Congress (TUC) was held in Southport, and Threlfall was elected to serve as its President. At the following congress, he convinced the TUC to form a Labour Electoral Committee, to sponsor candidates for election to Parliament. He served as the body's first Secretary, and focused his activity on forming local labour electoral organisations, affiliated to the national body. The committee was renamed as the "Labour Electoral Association", and although it championed representation through the Liberal Party, it did sponsor Keir Hardie's independent candidacy at the 1888 Mid Lanarkshire by-election.

Threlfall stood for Parliament again, as a Lib-Lab candidate, in Liverpool Kirkdale at the 1892 general election, but he was again unsuccessful. Given its generally disappointing results, the body declined in importance, although Threlfall remained its Secretary until it was wound up, in 1895.

Threlfall was subsequently appointed as a magistrate in Southport. He also took up literature. The Sword of Allah, published in 1899, was described by the Saturday Review as an "illiterate shocker", and The Strange Adventures of a Magistrate was published in 1903. In 1900, he wrote an article for The Nineteenth Century, in which he proclaimed that the Senussi would lead a holy war against Britain and France. He applied unsuccessfully to the Royal Literary Fund in 1914 and successfully in 1929 and 1932.

Trade union offices
Preceded by James Thompson	President of the Trades Union Congress; 1885	Succeeded by Fred Maddison
