= Richard Winterbottom =

British politician

- Winterbottom in 1949

Member of Parliament for Sheffield Brightside
- In office 23 February 1950 – 9 February 1968
- Preceded by: Fred Marshall
- Succeeded by: Edward Griffiths

Personal details
- Born: 22 July 1899 Oldham, Lancashire
- Died: 9 February 1968 (aged 68)
- Party: Labour
- Profession: Trade unionist and politician

Military service
- Allegiance: United Kingdom
- Branch/service: Royal Navy
- Battles/wars: World War One

Richard Emanuel Winterbottom (22 July 1899 – 9 February 1968) was a British Labour Party politician.

Born in Oldham, Lancashire, Winterbottom served in the Royal Navy during World War I. He became an area organiser for a predecessor of the Union of Shop, Distributive and Allied Workers in 1931, then the national organiser in 1944. In 1950, he was elected as the Member of Parliament (MP) for Sheffield Brightside, serving for his first year as Parliamentary Private Secretary to Ness Edwards.

Winterbottom remained in Parliament until his death in 1968.

Parliament of the United Kingdom
Preceded by Fred Marshall	Member of Parliament for Sheffield Brightside; 1950–1968	Succeeded by Edward Griffiths
