= Hamer Russell =

Hamer Field Russell

Member of Parliament for Sheffield Brightside
- In office 27 October 1931 – 25 October 1935
- Preceded by: Fred Marshall
- Succeeded by: Fred Marshall

Personal details
- Born: 1876 Kingston upon Hull, Yorkshire, England
- Died: 6 June 1941 (aged 64–65) Sheffield, Yorkshire, England
- Occupation: Builders Merchant

Hamer Field Russell (1876 – 6 June 1941) was a British politician.

Russell was born in Kingston upon Hull in 1876 the son of John Thomas and Annie Kate Russell, his father was a timber merchant. He attended Eton House School in Kingston upon Hull before becoming a sales representative then a builders' merchant. He became active in the Liberal Party and stood unsuccessfully as their candidate in Sheffield Ecclesall at the 1923 general election. He also served as a Liberal councillor.

Around 1929, in 1928 according to The Times House of Commons 1931, Russell joined the Conservative Party. In his new colours, he took second place in the 1930 Sheffield Brightside by-election behind Fred Marshall. He was able to take the seat at the 1931 general election, but lost it in 1935.

== See also ==
- Politics of the United Kingdom

Parliament of the United Kingdom
Preceded by Fred Marshall	Member of Parliament for Sheffield Brightside; 1931–1935	Succeeded by Fred Marshall
