= Fred Maddison =

British politician (1856–1937)

Maddison circa 1900

Maddison in 1906

Frederick Maddison JP (17 August 1856 – 12 March 1937) was a British trade union leader and Liberal politician.

== Background ==
Born in Boston, Lincolnshire, Maddison studied at Adelaide Street Wesleyan School, Kingston upon Hull.

== Career ==
He joined the Typographical Association and soon rose in prominence, becoming President of the Trades Union Congress in 1886. In 1887, he became the first working class member of Hull Corporation. He took a post in the Labour Department of the Board of Trade, and became a labour journalist.

Maddison stood as a Lib–Lab candidate for Parliament on several occasions, first in Kingston upon Hull Central at the 1892 and 1895 general elections. He was elected as Member of Parliament (MP) for Sheffield Brightside at a by-election in 1897, becoming Sheffield's first working class Member of Parliament, but narrowly lost the seat at the 1900 election. A major factor in his defeat was his support for the Boers during the Boer War. Maddison was not a man of independent financial means and was seeking to represent working class constituencies which were not in a position to bank roll a candidate at election time. From 1897 onwards, he was reliant upon the Liberal Party Chief to arrange for the payment of his election expenses.

In 1906, Maddison was elected for Burnley. Dod's Parliamentary Companion in 1907 described him as a Radical, in favour of Old Age Pensions, Taxation of Land Values and Reform of the House of Lords. In June 1908 the Lib-Lab trade union group of MPs debated their relationship with the Labour Party at future elections. It was proposed that sitting members of both groups should be given support, along with any candidates endorsed by the TUC Parliamentary Committee. Maddison was a vocal part of the minority who opposed this relationship. He argued that group members should be free to support any Liberal candidates who faced Labour Party opposition, pointing out on class grounds that the proposal, in this instance, would force the group to back a middle-class candidate endorsed by the Labour Party over a working-class candidate endorsed by his Liberal Association. Even though he was returned at Burnley in 1906, Maddison was on the look out to switch constituencies for the 1910 election. Liberal Chief Whip Jack Pease was keen to find a Liberal to run against the Labour Party's Ramsay MacDonald at Leicester and Maddison's candidacy was approved by Prime Minister Asquith. However, Maddison chose to defend his seat at Burnley. He lost this seat in January 1910.

He never returned to Parliament, despite standing at Darlington in December 1910, Holderness in 1918, South Dorset in 1922 and finally Reading in 1923. He was President of the Labour Association for Promoting Co-operative Production. As a committed pacifist, he was Secretary of the International Arbitration League. He was a Justice of the peace for the County of London.

Trade union offices
Preceded by T. R. Threlfall	President of the Trades Union Congress; 1886	Succeeded by W. Bevan
Preceded by W. R. Strachan	President of the Hull Trades Council; 1886–1888	Succeeded by W. G. Millington
Parliament of the United Kingdom
Preceded by A. J. Mundella	Member of Parliament for Sheffield Brightside; 1897–1900	Succeeded by James Hope
Preceded by William Mitchell	Member of Parliament for Burnley; 1906–January 1910	Succeeded by Gerald Arbuthnot
