= Joan Maynard (politician) =

British politician

Member of Parliament for Sheffield Brightside
- In office 10 October 1974 – 18 May 1987
- Preceded by: Edward Griffiths
- Succeeded by: David Blunkett

Personal details
- Born: 5 July 1921 Easingwold, North Yorkshire, England
- Died: 27 March 1998 (aged 76) Sowerby, North Yorkshire, England
- Party: Labour
- Occupation: Trade union official

Vera Joan Maynard (5 July 1921 – 27 March 1998) was an English Labour politician and trade unionist. She was the first female MP to represent the city of Sheffield.

== Biography ==
Maynard was born in Easingwold, North Yorkshire on 5 July 1921. Maynard was a leading activist in the National Union of Agricultural Workers becoming vice-president of the union and being narrowly beaten to its presidency.

She joined the Labour Party in 1946 and served as a councillor on the North Riding County Council. She was elected to Labour's National Executive Committee 1972–82 and 1983–87, and was vice-chair of the Labour Party 1980–81. From her election to the NEC she supplied Communist Party trade union organiser Bert Ramelson with confidential accounts of NEC meetings. She was appointed a Justice of the Peace at Thirsk in 1950.

Having acted as Labour agent in Thirsk, North Yorkshire, Maynard was elected in 1974 as MP for Sheffield Brightside and held the seat until she retired in 1987. She marks the distinction of being the first woman elected to represent the city of Sheffield in the House of Commons.

Throughout her political career Maynard advocated policies on the left of the Labour Party and chaired the left-wing Campaign Group. She served on the Agriculture Select Committee 1975–87. She played a leading role in securing the passage of the Rent (Agriculture) Act 1976 which put an end to the tied cottage system. Gavin Strang, then Agricultural Minister, spoke of them both having grown up on farms as an explanation for why they regularly came together to work to improve conditions for agricultural workers.

She was an active supporter of the Troops Out Movement which campaigned for the withdrawal of British troops from Northern Ireland and a united Ireland in the 1970s and 1980s. She was dubbed "Stalin's Granny" by the press as a response to her left-wing views.

Jeremy Corbyn MP, Leader of the Labour Party from 2015 to 2020, said that Maynard became a 'great friend' to him when he first joined the House of Commons in 1983. He recounted that Maynard had told him that "If both front benches are agreed, it’s probably bad news for the workers. And if a minister ever gets up and says 'we’re going to have to take some tough choices and some tough decisions,’ it's a disaster for the working class. Just bear that in mind and you'll not go far wrong."

Maynard died of cancer in Sowerby, North Yorkshire on 27 March 1998, the same day as fellow former MP, Joan Lestor. Her remains are buried alongside her immediate family at Thornton-le-Street.

== Bibliography ==
- Mason-O'Connor, Kristine (2003). Joan Maynard: A Passionate Socialist. Politico's Publishing. ISBN 1-84275-059-3
- Routledge, Paul (2003). Bumper Book of British Lefties. Politico's Publishing. ISBN 1-84275-064-X

Parliament of the United Kingdom
Preceded by Edward Griffiths	Member of Parliament for Sheffield Brightside; October 1974–1987	Succeeded by David Blunkett
