= 1897 Sheffield Brightside by-election =

UK parliamentary by-election

The 1897 Sheffield Brightside by-election was held on 6 August 1897 due to the death of the incumbent Liberal MP Anthony John Mundella. It was won by the Liberal-Labour candidate Frederick Maddison.

F. Maddison

Sheffield Brightside by-election, 1897
Party	Candidate	Votes	%	±%
Lib-Lab	Frederick Maddison	4,289	51.1	N/A
Conservative	James Fitzalan Hope	4,106	48.9	New
Majority		183	2.2	N/A
Turnout		8,395	77.1	N/A
Lib-Lab hold		Swing	N/A	
