= Edward Griffiths (politician) =

Edward Griffiths (7 March 1929 – 18 October 1995) was a British Labour politician and worker-director of the British Steel Corporation.

Griffiths, a Welshman, was educated at University College of North Wales, Bangor, and afterwards worked as an industrial chemist in the steel industry. Having been elected to Flintshire County Council in 1964, he became Member of Parliament (MP) for Sheffield Brightside following a 1968 by-election. In September 1974, he was deselected as a candidate by his local Constituency Labour Party in favour of Joan Maynard one month before the general election, and then decided to stand against Maynard as an Independent Labour candidate. He lost by a margin of 7,926 votes (22%), although he polled 28% of the vote and finished in second place. However, he was never elected an MP again.

In 1979 Griffiths switched sides and supported the Conservatives at that year's general election, held in May. His defection was announced on 29 April at an election rally in London for trade unionists who supported the Conservatives. In 1983, he changed parties once again, this time to the Social Democratic Party (SDP).

Parliament of the United Kingdom
Preceded by Richard Winterbottom	Member of Parliament for Sheffield Brightside; 1968–October 1974	Succeeded by Joan Maynard
