= Howard Vincent =

British politician

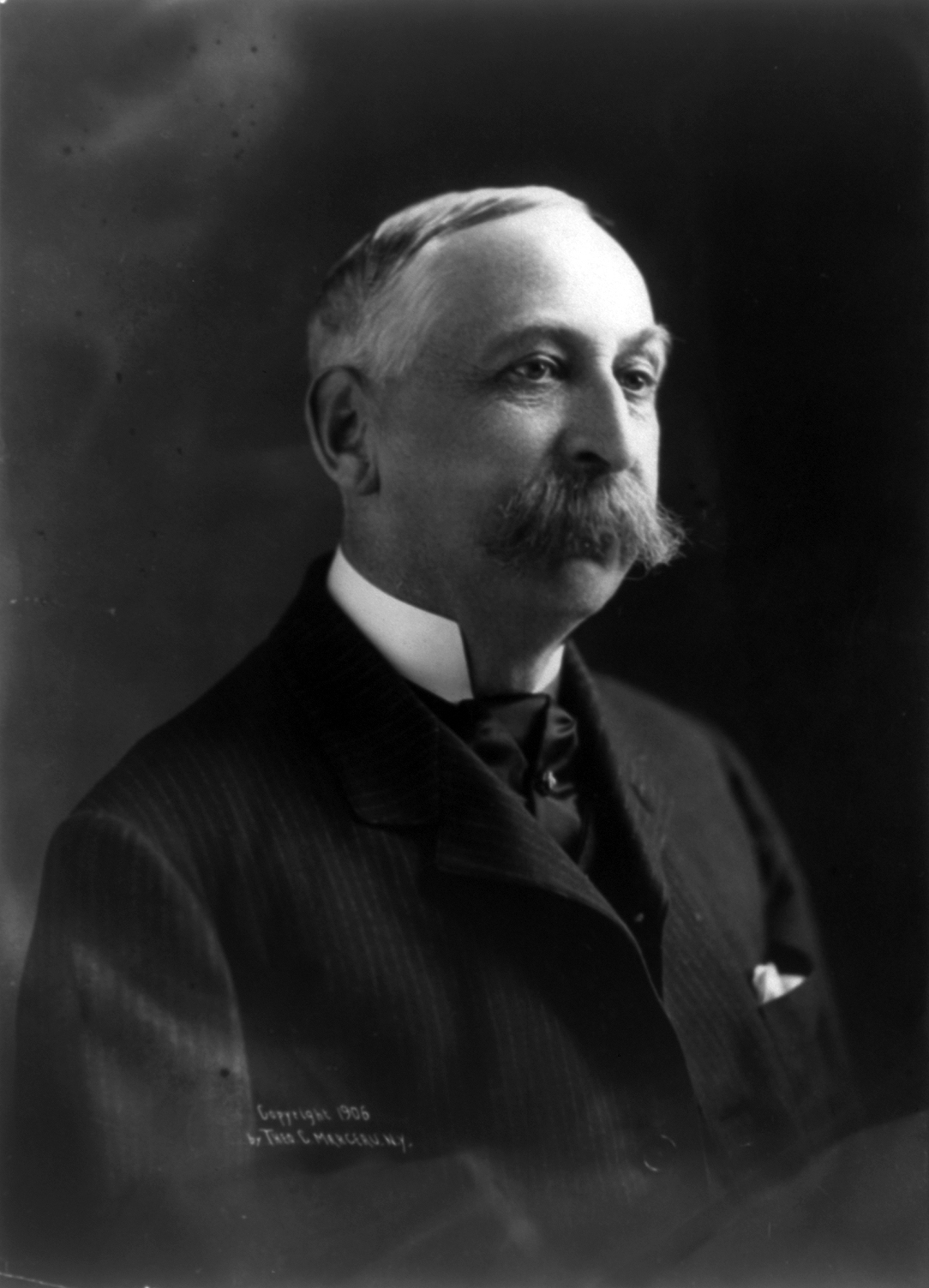
Sir C. E. Howard Vincent, c. 1906

Colonel Sir Charles Edward Howard Vincent KCMG CB DL (31 May 1849 – 7 April 1908), known as Howard Vincent or C. E. Howard Vincent, was a British soldier, barrister, police official and Conservative Party politician who sat in the House of Commons from 1885 to 1908.

== Life ==
=== Early life and education ===
Vincent was born in Slinfold, near Horsham in Sussex, the second son of Sir Frederick Vincent, 11th Baronet, the village's rector. His brothers included Sir William Vincent, 12th Baronet; Claude Vincent, who became an administrator in India; and the financier and diplomat Edgar Vincent, 1st Viscount D'Abernon.

He was educated at Westminster School and in November 1866 entered the Royal Military College, Sandhurst. Passing out in 1868, he purchased a commission in the 23rd Foot (later the Royal Welch Fusiliers).

=== Officer, journalist and lawyer ===
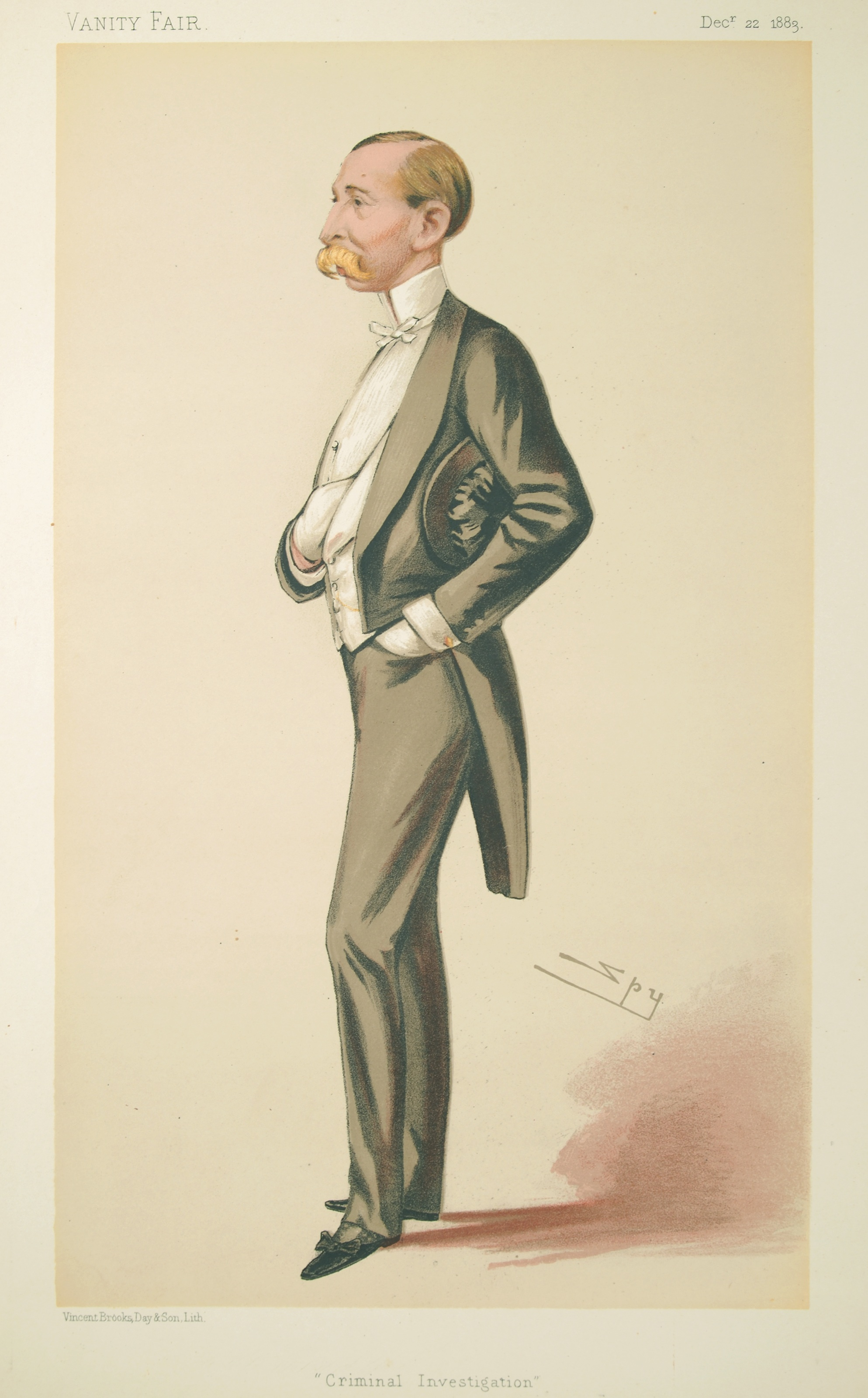
Caricature by Spy published in Vanity Fair in 1883.

He was promoted lieutenant in 1871. In 1871, he served as a correspondent with the Daily Telegraph in Berlin and then went on to Russia to learn the language and study the country's military organisation. In 1872 he began to write articles and lecture at the Royal United Services Institution. After his regiment was posted to Ireland later that year, he began to address political meetings on the Irish question, expressing generally Liberal views.

On 3 May 1873, Vincent enrolled as a pupil barrister at the Inner Temple. In that and the following year he travelled to Turkey and again to Russia, learning Turkish (to add to Russian, French, German and Italian, which he already knew). He also became an expert on the politics of the Near East. In 1874, he was commissioned into the Royal Berkshire Militia as a captain. He resigned his commission in November 1875, but a month later was appointed lieutenant-colonel commanding the 40th (Central London Rifle Rangers) Middlesex Rifle Volunteer Corps, again resigning his commission in 1878. He continued to write on political and military matters.

He was called to the bar on 20 January 1876 and joined the South-Eastern Circuit in the Probate, Divorce and Admiralty Division, although he never really devoted himself to the law. On the outbreak of the Russo-Turkish War in 1877, the Daily Telegraph sent him to report on the Russian Army, but he was refused permission to accompany the army into the field, as the Russians were suspicious that he spoke Russian and suspected him of being a Turkish sympathiser.

=== Metropolitan Police ===
In 1877 he enrolled as a student at the faculté de droit of the University of Paris and investigated the Parisian police. When, later that year, the Metropolitan Police Detective Branch was hit by a scandal in which several senior officers were dismissed, Vincent was asked to report on the Paris detective system. This so impressed R. A. Cross, the Home Secretary, that in 1878 he was appointed to the new post of Director of Criminal Investigation to head the new Criminal Investigation Department.

Although without the official status of Assistant Commissioner, this post was equivalent to the two Assistant Commissioners in almost every way. Vincent answered directly to the Home Secretary and not to the Commissioner, which put him in a rather strange position, as his deputy, Adolphus Williamson, and his men did answer to the Commissioner (luckily Vincent and Commissioner Sir Edmund Henderson had a good relationship). Vincent completely reorganised the department. From 1883 he also edited the Police Gazette. He was rewarded for his police service by being appointed Companion of the Order of the Bath (CB) in 1885.

=== Politics and the Volunteers ===
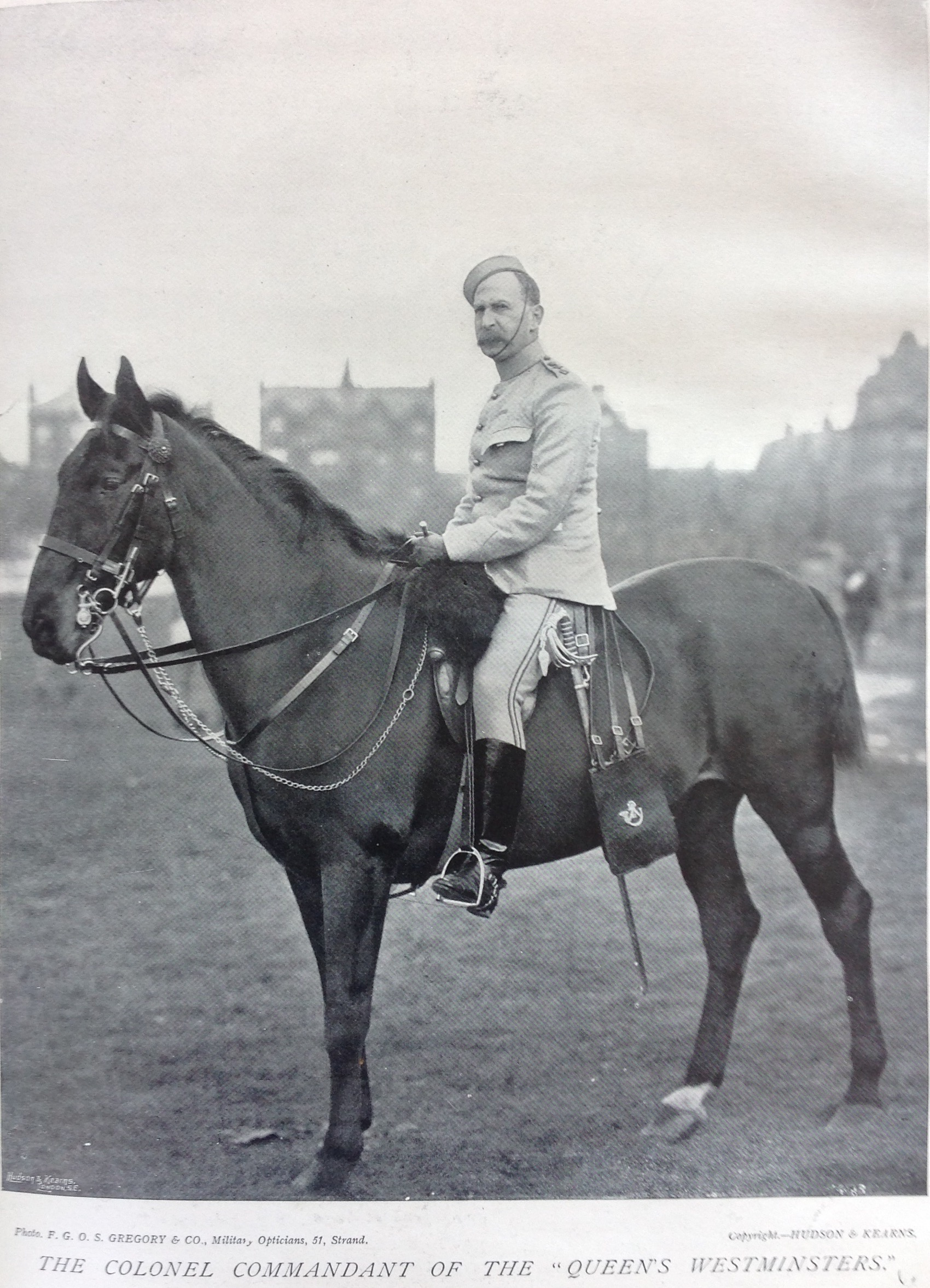
Colonel of Queen's Westminsters 1896

In 1884, however, realising that his police post offered little chance of further advancement, he resigned to enter politics. Vincent went on a world tour, in which he was so impressed with the effects of imperialism that he decided to stand for the Conservative Party (although he had previously tended towards Liberalism). At the general election in November 1885 he defeated Samuel Plimsoll to win the constituency of Sheffield Central. He remained in Parliament until his death, being returned unopposed in 1895 and 1900, although he had to win the elections of 1886, 1892 and 1906. Also in 1884 he was appointed lieutenant-colonel commanding the Queen's Westminster Volunteers, holding the post for twenty years until 1904.

As an MP Vincent became the first politician to rally the public in support of opposition to immigration and make it a campaign issue. He was assisted in this endeavour by William Evans-Gordon who soon took over from Vincent as the focus of "anti-alien" campaigning. He also served on London County Council from 1889 to 1906 and was appointed a Deputy Lieutenant of the County of London in 1889 He founded the United Empire Trade League in 1891 and served as its honorary secretary until his death. He was chairman of the National Union of Conservative and Unionist Associations from 1895, chairman of the Conservative Party Publication Committee from 1896, and vice-chairman of the Primrose League from 1901.

Vincent was knighted in 1896 and appointed Knight Commander of the Order of St Michael and St George (KCMG) in 1898 for his service as British delegate to a conference on anarchists in Rome. Also in 1898 he was appointed to the Royal Commission organising the United Kingdom's participation in the Paris Exhibition of 1900. In 1901 he chaired an inquiry into the Royal Irish Constabulary and the Dublin Metropolitan Police.

Having been granted the honorary rank of colonel in 1894, he was selected to command the infantry of the City Imperial Volunteers in the Second Boer War, but was eventually refused permission to go due to a heart problem. He went in a private capacity anyway, however, and arrived in Cape Town in January 1900, at the height of the war. He was awarded the Volunteer Officers' Decoration, and appointed aide-de-camp to the King, and colonel in the Volunteer Force in 1901.

In September 1902 he attended the Congress of the International Union of Penal Jurisprudence at St. Petersburg. He resigned his army commission for the final time in 1904, retaining his rank. He retained his Parliamentary seat, and his characteristic interjection of a sarcastic 'Yah, yah!' into the opposition speeches continued until his death aged 59 on 7 April 1908.

== Footnotes ==
Police appointments
Preceded by First incumbent	Director of Criminal Investigation, Metropolitan Police; 1878–1884	Succeeded by James Monro; Assistant Commissioner (Crime)
Parliament of the United Kingdom
New constituency	Member of Parliament for Sheffield Central; 1885–1908	Succeeded by James Hope
Party political offices
Preceded by James Rankin	Chairman of the National Union of Conservative and Constitutional Associations; 1895	Succeeded by Marquess of Granby
