= Sheffield Central =

UK Parliament constituency (1885–1950, 1983 onwards)

- Borough constituency for the House of Commons
- Boundaries since 2024
- Boundary of Sheffield Central in Yorkshire and the Humber
- County: South Yorkshire
- Electorate: 79,414 (December 2019)

Current constituency
- Created: 1983
- Member of Parliament: Abtisam Mohamed
- Seats: One
- Created from: Sheffield Park, Sheffield Hillsborough, Sheffield Hallam and Sheffield Attercliffe

1885–1950
- Seats: One
- Created from: Sheffield
- Replaced by: Sheffield Neepsend and Sheffield Hallam

Sheffield Central is a constituency represented in the House of Commons of the UK Parliament since 2024 by Abtisam Mohamed, a member of the Labour Party.

== Constituency profile ==
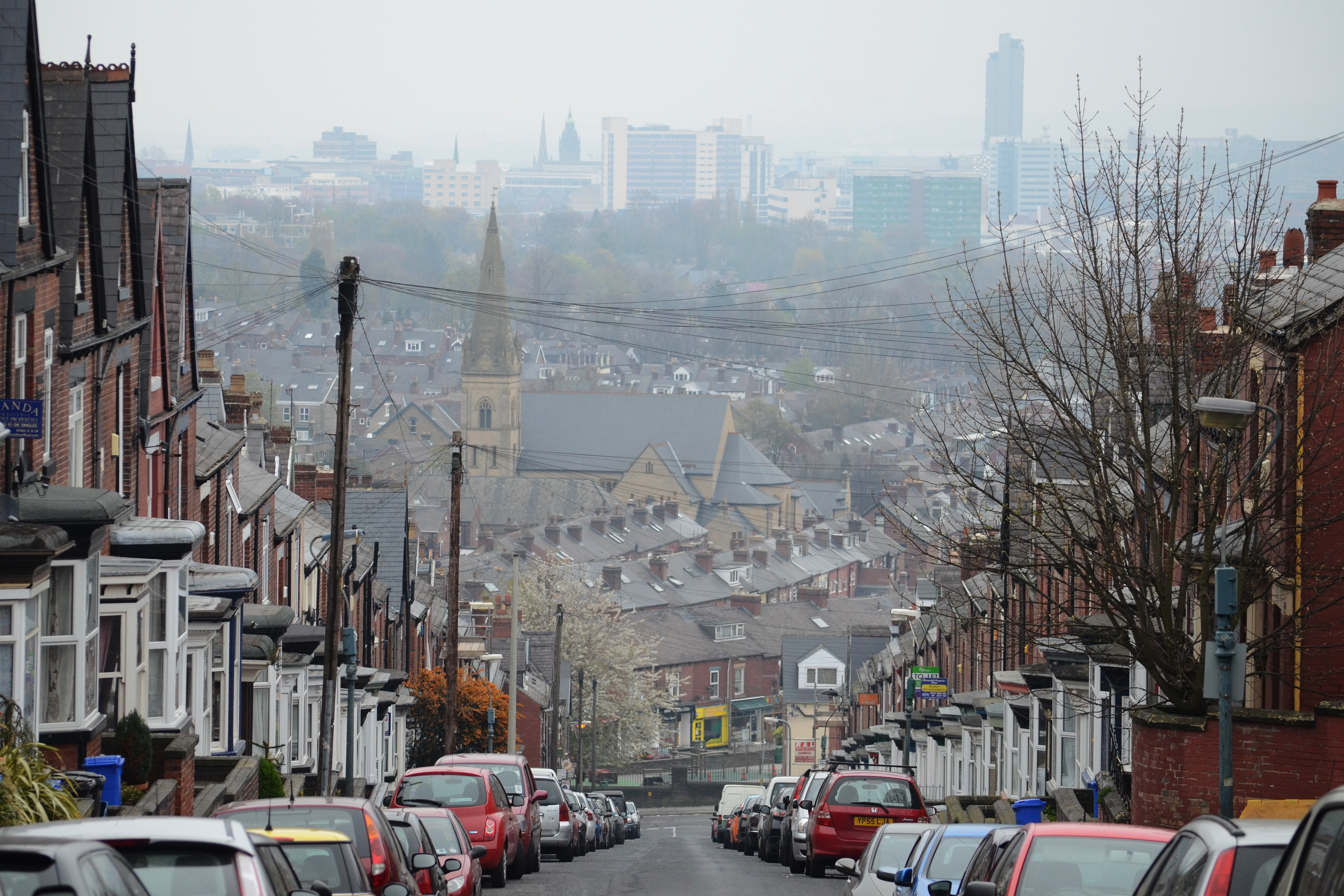
Sheffield city centre viewed from Hunter House Road, Brincliffe

Sheffield Central is a constituency in South Yorkshire in England. It covers the city centre of Sheffield and the neighbourhoods to its south and west, including Walkley, Upperthorpe, Netherthorpe, Broomhill and Nether Edge.

Sheffield is traditionally an industrial city that grew rapidly during the late 18th and early 19th centuries, with steelmaking and coal mining being the predominant industries. Much of the city was redeveloped after World War II; the city's steel industry made it a target for the Luftwaffe in the Sheffield Blitz. The city centre has average levels of wealth with most residents living in apartments. There are some deprived neighbourhoods, largely made up of dense terraced housing, surrounding the city centre. Walkley, Broomhill and Nether Edge are more affluent and suburban in character. House prices across the constituency are generally higher than the rest of Yorkshire but lower than the UK average.

Sheffield Central has a very low population of middle-aged and older adults and a very high proportion of students. This constituency contains Sheffield's two universities, the University of Sheffield and Sheffield Hallam University, which together have almost 60,000 students. Sheffield Central has the youngest median age of any constituency in the UK; 18 to 24 year olds make up 31% of the population compared to 8% across England and Wales. Residents have average rates of income and very low levels of homeownership. The child poverty rate is high. Residents are very well-educated and a high proportion work in the education and public sectors. The percentage claiming unemployment benefits is in line with the overall UK rate. White people made up 67% of the population at the 2021 census. Asians were the largest ethnic minority group at 17%, including a large Chinese-origin community. Black people were 6% of the population.

At the local city council, most of the constituency is represented by the Green Party with some Labour Party councillors. Voters in Sheffield Central overwhelmingly supported remaining in the European Union in the 2016 referendum; an estimated 73% voted to remain compared to the UK-wide figure of 48%.

== Boundaries ==
First creation

1885–1918: The Municipal Borough of Sheffield wards of St Peter's and St Philip's, and part of St George's ward.

1918–1950: The County Borough of Sheffield wards of St Peter's and St Philip's, and part of Broomhall ward.

1950-1983: See other seats.

Second creation (current)

Map of 2010–2024 boundaries

1983–1997: The City of Sheffield wards of Burngreave, Castle, Manor, Netherthorpe, and Sharrow.

1997–2010: as above plus Nether Edge

Sheffield City Council was subject to new ward boundaries from 2004, which removed Castle, Manor, Netherthorpe and Sharrow, whilst adding Central and Manor Castle wards.

2010–2016: The City of Sheffield wards of Broomhill, Central, Manor Castle, Nether Edge, and Walkley (as they existed on 12 April 2005).

2016–2024: Following a local government boundary review, which did not effect the parliamentary boundaries, the contents of the constituency were as follows with effect from May 2016:

- The City of Sheffield wards of Broomhill & Sharrow Vale, City, Manor Castle, Nether Edge & Sharrow, and Walkley; and parts of the wards of Crookes & Crosspool, Ecclesall, Fulwood and Hillsborough.

2024–present: Further to the 2023 periodic review of Westminster constituencies which came into effect for the 2024 general election, the constituency comprises:

- The City of Sheffield wards of: Broomhill & Sharrow Vale; City; Nether Edge & Sharrow; and Walkley.

The Manor Castle ward was transferred to Sheffield Heeley, bringing the electorate within the permitted range. Other minor losses to align with new ward boundaries.

Present boundaries

The seat covers central Sheffield and extends as far as Nether Edge and the Lower Walkley. It covers a similar area to the former Sheffield Park seat. It borders Sheffield Hallam, Sheffield Heeley, Sheffield Brightside and Hillsborough and Sheffield South East.

== History ==
=== 1885–1950 ===
Created under the Redistribution of Seats Act 1885 for the election that year, Sheffield Central was one of five divisions of the former Sheffield constituency. Sheffield Central was abolished in 1950 and the sitting MP, Harry Morris, stood and won in the new seat (now extinct) of Sheffield Neepsend.

=== 1983–present ===
Revival

In varied form the constituency was brought back into existence for the 1983 general election.

MPs

Labour's Richard Caborn represented Sheffield Central from its recreation in 1983 until he retired in 2010 and was narrowly succeeded at the ballot box by another Labour MP, Paul Blomfield. Blomfield retired for the 2024 general election, with the Labour Party selecting Sheffield city councillor Abtisam Mohamed to fight the seat, beating Eddie Izzard in the selection contest. Mohamed was duly elected with a much reduced, but still comfortable majority.

Winning margin

The 2015 result made the seat the 32nd-safest of Labour's 232 seats by percentage of majority.

Labour majorities since 1983 in Sheffield Central have been in the top quartile save for 2010, when the Liberal Democrat share of the vote came 0.4% short of winning the seat — a highly marginal result.

Opposition parties

The Green Party took second place in 2015, gaining a +12.1% swing (compared with +2.8% nationwide). This was the main target seat of the party in Yorkshire. Its 2012-2016 Leader Natalie Bennett, chose to settle locally on stepping down from the policy-steering role in 2016 and had chosen to contest Sheffield Central at the 2017 general election, when its vote share halved and they fell back to third place. The Green candidate at the 2024 general election regained second place with 26% of the vote. Lib Dem candidates scored variable second places in 1997, 2001, 2005 and 2010 then took fourth place in 2015.

Turnout

Turnout has ranged from 62.5% in 1987 to 49.5% in 2001.

Sheffield's seats compared – unemployment
Office for National Statistics November 2012	Jobseeker's Allowance claimant count
Sheffield Brightside and Hillsborough	7.6% (Note: This seat also saw the widest gender disparity with 10.5% of men were claimants, vs. 4.8% of women)
Sheffield Central	4.0%
Sheffield Hallam	1.5%
Sheffield Heeley	5.7%
Sheffield South East	4.4%

The district contributing to the bulk of the seat has a medium 33% of its population without a car. (Note: This falls within the centrally coloured banding for metropolitan areas) A medium 24.3% of the city's population are without qualifications, a high 15.8% of the population with level 3 qualifications and a medium 25.7% with level 4 qualifications or above. In terms of tenure a relatively low 58.3% of homes are owned outright or on a mortgage by occupants as at the 2011 census across the district.

== Members of Parliament ==
=== MPs 1885–1950 ===
Year	Member	Party
1885	Howard Vincent	Conservative
1908	James Hope	Conservative
1929	Philip Hoffman	Labour
1931	William Boulton	Conservative
1945	Harry Morris	Labour
1950	Constituency abolished	

=== MPs since 1983 ===
Year	Member	Party
1983	Richard Caborn	Labour
2010	Paul Blomfield	Labour
2024	Abtisam Mohamed	Labour

== Elections ==
=== Elections in the 2020s ===
General election 2024: Sheffield Central
Party	Candidate	Votes	%	±%
Labour	Abtisam Mohamed	16,569	52.1	▼14.9
Green	Angela Argenzio	8,283	26.0	▲15.1
Conservative	Lucy Stephenson	2,339	7.4	▼5.0
Liberal Democrats	Sam Christmas	2,174	6.8	▲1.4
Independent	Alison Teal	1,039	3.3	N/A
Workers Party	Caitlin Hardy	656	2.1	N/A
TUSC	Isabelle France	409	1.3	N/A
SDP	Annie Stoker	334	1.1	N/A
Majority		8,286	26.1	▼28.5
Turnout		31,803	52.3	▼1.7
Registered electors		60,777		
Labour hold		Swing	▼15.0	

=== Elections in the 2010s ===
2019 notional result
Party	Vote	%
Labour	25,495	67.0
Conservative	4,722	12.4
Green	4,136	10.9
Liberal Democrats	2,070	5.4
Brexit Party	1,170	3.1
Others	474	1.3
Turnout	38,067	54.0
Electorate	70,453	

General election 2019: Sheffield Central
Party	Candidate	Votes	%	±%
Labour	Paul Blomfield	33,968	66.7	−4.2
Conservative	Janice Silvester-Hall	6,695	13.1	+0.1
Green	Alison Teal	4,570	9.0	+1.0
Liberal Democrats	Colin Ross	3,237	6.4	+1.3
Brexit Party	Paul Ward	1,969	3.9	New
Yorkshire	Jack Carrington	416	0.8	+0.4
Independent	Barry James	30	0.1	New
Socialist Equality	Chris Marsden	28	0.1	New
Majority		27,273	53.6	−4.3
Turnout		50,913	56.7	−5.3
Labour hold		Swing	-2.1	

General election 2017: Sheffield Central
Party	Candidate	Votes	%	±%
Labour	Paul Blomfield	33,963	70.9	+15.9
Conservative	Stephanie Roe	6,215	13.0	+1.9
Green	Natalie Bennett	3,848	8.0	−7.8
Liberal Democrats	Shaffaq Mohammed	2,465	5.1	−4.6
UKIP	Dominic Cook	1,060	2.2	−5.3
Yorkshire	Jack Carrington	197	0.4	New
Pirate	Rob Moran	91	0.2	−0.1
SDP	Joe Westnidge	38	0.1	New
Majority		27,748	57.9	+15.7
Turnout		47,877	62.0	+4.6
Labour hold		Swing	+7.0	

General election 2015: Sheffield Central
Party	Candidate	Votes	%	±%
Labour	Paul Blomfield	24,308	55.0	+13.7
Green	Jillian Creasy	6,999	15.8	+12.0
Conservative	Stephanie Roe	4,917	11.1	+1.0
Liberal Democrats	Joe Otten	4,278	9.7	−31.2
UKIP	Dominic Cook	3,296	7.5	+5.9
Communist	Steve Andrew	119	0.3	New
Pirate	Andy Halsall	113	0.3	New
English Democrat	Elizabeth Breed	68	0.2	New
Above and Beyond Party	Thom Brown	42	0.1	New
Workers Revolutionary	Michael Driver	33	0.1	New
Majority		17,309	39.2	+38.8
Turnout		44,173	57.4	−2.2
Labour hold		Swing	+0.8	

General election 2010: Sheffield Central
Party	Candidate	Votes	%	±%
Labour	Paul Blomfield	17,138	41.3	−5.2
Liberal Democrats	Paul Scriven	16,973	40.9	+9.5
Conservative	Andrew Lee	4,206	10.1	+1.0
Green	Jillian Creasy	1,556	3.8	−2.0
BNP	Tracey Smith	903	2.2	+0.6
UKIP	Jeffrey Shaw	652	1.6	−0.1
Independent	Rod Rodgers	40	0.1	New
Majority		165	0.4	−23.1
Turnout		41,468	59.6	+4.6
Labour hold		Swing	-7.4	

=== Elections in the 2000s ===
General election 2005: Sheffield Central
Party	Candidate	Votes	%	±%
Labour	Richard Caborn	14,950	49.9	−11.5
Liberal Democrats	Ali Qadar	7,895	26.3	+6.6
Conservative	Samantha George	3,094	10.3	−0.6
Green	Bernard Little	1,808	6.0	+2.6
Respect	Maxine Bowler	1,284	4.3	New
BNP	Mark Payne	539	1.8	New
UKIP	Charlotte Arnott	415	1.4	+0.5
Majority		7,055	23.6	−18.1
Turnout		29,985	50.1	+0.6
Labour hold		Swing	-9.1	

General election 2001: Sheffield Central
Party	Candidate	Votes	%	±%
Labour	Richard Caborn	18,477	61.4	−2.2
Liberal Democrats	Ali Qadar	5,933	19.7	+2.5
Conservative	Noelle Brelsford	3,289	10.9	−1.0
Green	Bernard Little	1,008	3.4	+0.8
Socialist Alliance	Nick Riley	754	2.5	New
Socialist Labour	David Hadfield	289	1.0	New
UKIP	Elizabeth Schofield	257	0.9	New
Workers Revolutionary	Robert Driver	62	0.2	−0.0
Majority		12,544	41.7	−4.7
Turnout		30,069	49.5	−3.5
Labour hold		Swing	-2.36	

=== Elections in the 1990s ===
General election 1997: Sheffield Central
Party	Candidate	Votes	%	±%
Labour	Richard Caborn	23,179	63.6	−5.1
Liberal Democrats	Ali Qadar	6,273	17.2	+5.6
Conservative	Martin Hess	4,341	11.9	−4.6
Green	Andy D'Agorne	954	2.6	+0.3
Referendum	Anthony Brownlow	863	2.4	New
Socialist	Ken Douglas	466	1.3	New
ProLife Alliance	Maureen Aitken	280	0.8	New
Workers Revolutionary	Michael Driver	63	0.2	New
Majority		16,906	46.4	−5.8
Turnout		36,419	53.0	−3.1
Labour hold		Swing		

General election 1992: Sheffield Central
Party	Candidate	Votes	%	±%
Labour	Richard Caborn	22,764	68.7	+1.0
Conservative	Vernon Davies	5,470	16.5	−0.6
Liberal Democrats	Andrew Sangar	3,856	11.6	−2.3
Green	Graham Wroe	750	2.3	New
End Unemployment Vote Justice for Jobless	Martin Clarke	212	0.6	New
Communist League	Josephine O'Brien	92	0.3	New
Majority		17,294	52.2	+1.6
Turnout		33,144	56.1	−5.4
Labour hold		Swing	+0.8	

=== Elections in the 1980s ===
General election 1987: Sheffield Central
Party	Candidate	Votes	%	±%
Labour	Richard Caborn	25,872	67.7	+7.5
Conservative	Brian Oxley	6,530	17.1	−2.1
SDP	Fiona Hornby	5,314	13.9	−5.5
Red Front	Ceri T. Dingle	278	0.7	New
Communist	Keith Petts	203	0.5	−0.2
Majority		19,342	50.6	+9.8
Turnout		38,197	62.5	+0.9
Labour hold		Swing		

General election 1983: Sheffield Central
Party	Candidate	Votes	%	±%
Labour	Richard Caborn	24,759	60.2	
SDP	Patricia Major	7,969	19.4	
Conservative	Patricia Rawlings	7,908	19.2	
Communist	Vi Gill	296	0.7	
Revolutionary Communist	C. Barrett	222	0.5	
Majority		16,790	40.8	
Turnout		41,154	61.6	
Labour win (new seat)				

== Election results 1885–1950 ==
=== Elections in the 1880s ===
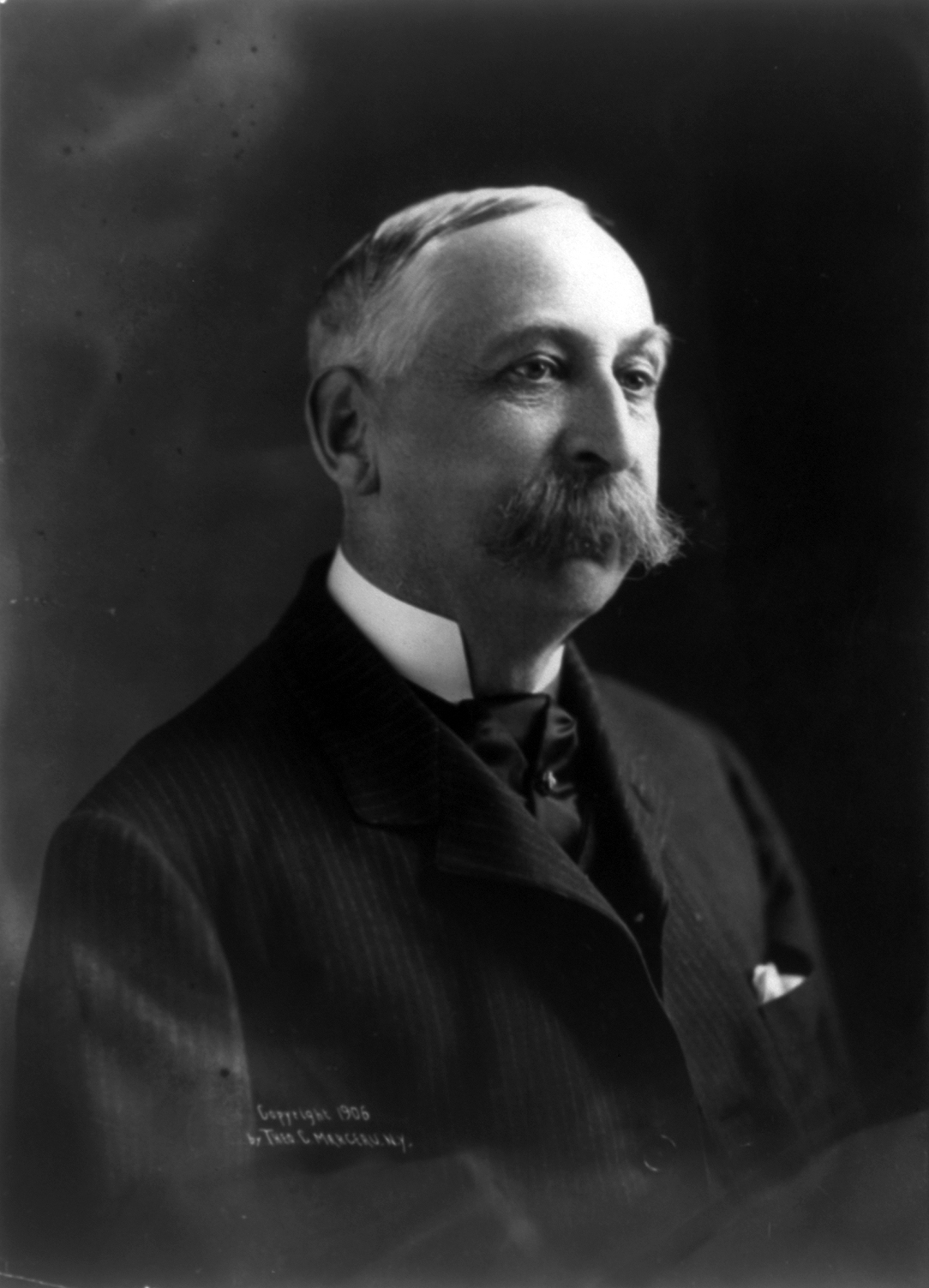
Howard Vincent

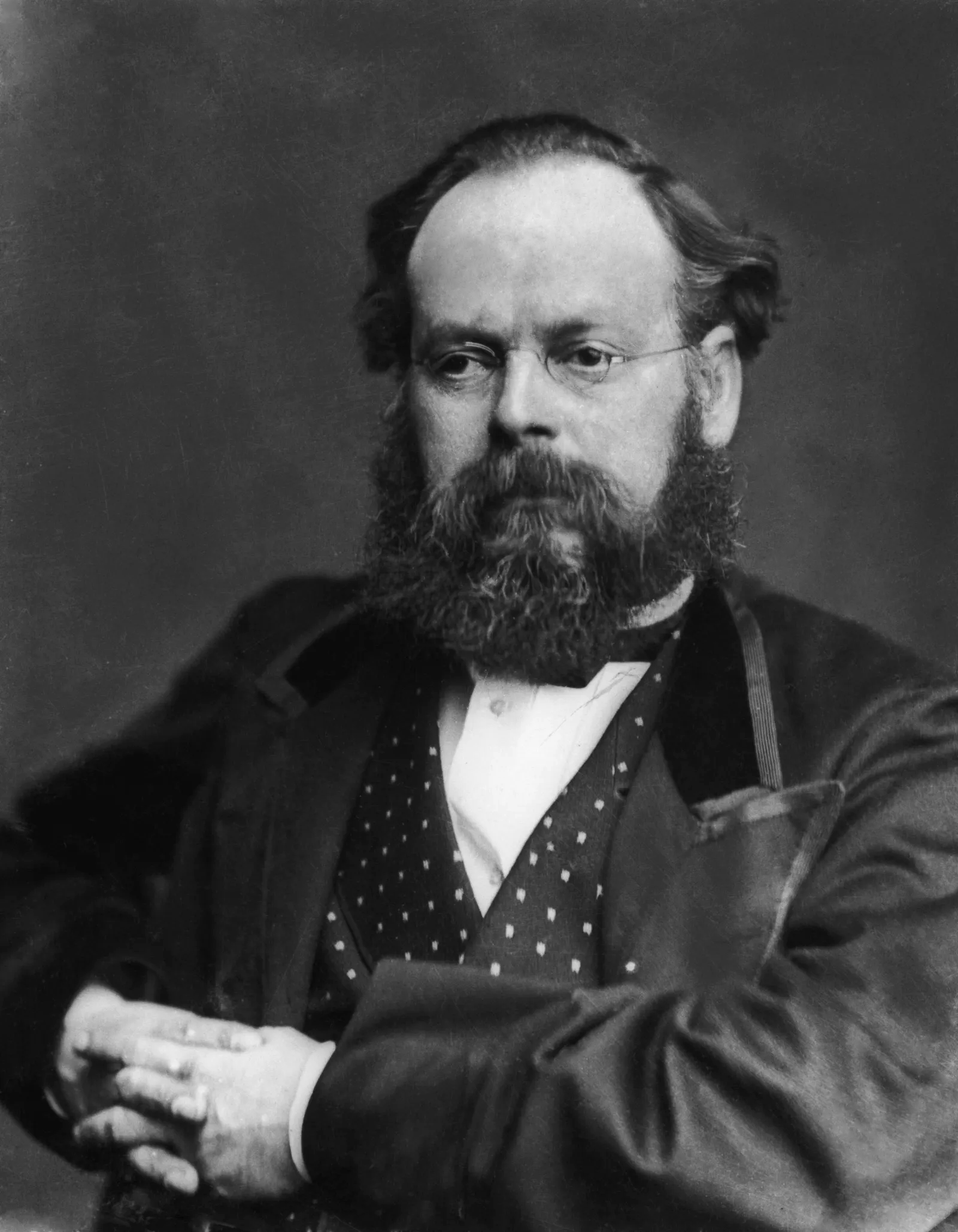
Samuel Plimsoll

General election 1885: Sheffield Central
Party	Candidate	Votes	%	±%
Conservative	Howard Vincent	4,633	56.1	
Lib-Lab	Samuel Plimsoll	3,484	42.2	
Independent Liberal	Mervyn Lanark Hawkes	140	1.7	
Majority		1,149	13.9	
Turnout		8,257	83.2	
Registered electors		9,923		
Conservative win (new seat)				

General election 1886: Sheffield Central
Party	Candidate	Votes	%	±%
Conservative	Howard Vincent	4,522	57.6	+1.5
Liberal	Joshua Hawkins	3,326	42.4	+0.2
Majority		1,196	15.2	+1.3
Turnout		7,848	79.1	−4.1
Registered electors		9,923		
Conservative hold		Swing	+0.7	

=== Elections in the 1890s ===
Robert Cameron

General election 1892: Sheffield Central
Party	Candidate	Votes	%	±%
Conservative	Howard Vincent	4,474	55.3	−2.3
Liberal	Robert Cameron	3,618	44.7	+2.3
Majority		856	10.6	−4.6
Turnout		8,092	83.2	+4.1
Registered electors		9,728		
Conservative hold		Swing	−2.3	

General election 1895: Sheffield Central
Party	Candidate	Votes	%	±%
Conservative	Howard Vincent	Unopposed		
Conservative hold				

=== Elections in the 1900s ===
1900 general election: Sheffield Central
Party	Candidate	Votes	%	±%
Conservative	Howard Vincent	Unopposed		
Conservative hold				

General election 1906: Sheffield Central
Party	Candidate	Votes	%	±%
Conservative	Howard Vincent	4,217	56.2	N/A
Liberal	Stanley Udale	3,290	43.8	New
Majority		927	12.4	N/A
Turnout		7,507	82.1	N/A
Registered electors		9,142		
Conservative hold		Swing	N/A	

By-election, 1908: Sheffield Central
Party	Candidate	Votes	%	±%
Conservative	James Hope	Unopposed		
Conservative hold				

Bailey

=== Elections in the 1910s ===
General election January 1910: Sheffield Central
Party	Candidate	Votes	%	±%
Conservative	James Hope	3,829	52.7	−3.5
Lib-Lab	Alfred James Bailey	3,440	47.3	+3.5
Majority		389	5.4	−7.0
Turnout		7,269	83.7	+1.6
Registered electors		8,684		
Conservative hold		Swing	−3.5	

General election December 1910: Sheffield Central
Party	Candidate	Votes	%	±%
Conservative	James Hope	3,455	51.4	−1.3
Lib-Lab	Alfred James Bailey	3,271	48.6	+1.3
Majority		184	2.8	−2.6
Turnout		6,726	77.5	−6.2
Registered electors		8,684		
Conservative hold		Swing	−1.3	

General election 1918: Sheffield Central
Party		Candidate	Votes	%	±%
C	Unionist	James Hope	9,361	58.7	+7.3
	Independent Labour	Alfred James Bailey	5,959	37.3	−11.3
	British Socialist Party	Robert George Murray	643	4.0	New
Majority			3,402	21.4	+18.6
Turnout			15,963	43.1	−34.4
	Unionist hold		Swing	+9.3	
C indicates candidate endorsed by the coalition government.

Bailey was sponsored by the National Amalgamated Union of Labour

=== Elections in the 1920s ===
General election 1922: Sheffield Central
Party	Candidate	Votes	%	±%
Unionist	James Hope	Unopposed		
Unionist hold				

General election 1923: Sheffield Central
Party	Candidate	Votes	%	±%
Unionist	James Hope	9,727	45.7	N/A
Labour	Tom Snowden	8,762	41.1	New
Liberal	John Henry Freeborough	2,810	13.2	New
Majority		965	4.6	N/A
Turnout		21,299	61.3	N/A
Unionist hold		Swing	N/A	

General election 1924: Sheffield Central
Party	Candidate	Votes	%	±%
Conservative	James Hope	13,302	50.6	+4.9
Labour	Tom Snowden	12,995	49.4	+8.3
Majority		307	1.2	−3.4
Turnout		26,297	74.5	+13.2
Conservative hold		Swing	-1.7	

General election 1929: Sheffield Central
Party	Candidate	Votes	%	±%
Labour	Philip Hoffman	19,183	59.1	+8.5
Unionist	John Ralph Patientins Warde-Aldam	13,284	40.9	−8.5
Majority		5,899	18.2	N/A
Turnout		32,467	74.1	−0.4
Labour gain from Unionist		Swing	+8.5	

=== Elections in the 1930s ===
General election 1931: Sheffield Central
Party	Candidate	Votes	%	±%
Conservative	William Boulton	21,589	62.0	+12.1
Labour	Philip Hoffman	13,212	38.0	−12.1
Majority		8,377	24.0	N/A
Turnout		34,801	80.2	+6.1
Conservative gain from Labour		Swing	+12.1	

General election 1935: Sheffield Central
Party	Candidate	Votes	%	±%
Conservative	William Boulton	13,828	50.8	−11.2
Labour	Philip Hoffman	13,408	49.2	+11.2
Majority		420	1.6	−22.4
Turnout		27,229	74.2	−6.0
Conservative hold		Swing	−11.2	

=== Elections in the 1940s ===
General election 1945: Sheffield Central
Party	Candidate	Votes	%	±%
Labour	Harry Morris	7,954	59.2	+10.0
Conservative	George Vivian Hunt	5,481	40.8	−10.0
Majority		2,473	18.4	N/A
Turnout		13,435	72.0	−2.2
Labour gain from Conservative		Swing	+10.0	

== See also ==
- List of parliamentary constituencies in South Yorkshire
- List of parliamentary constituencies in the Yorkshire and the Humber (region)
