= Nether Edge Hospital =

Hospital in South Yorkshire, England

- Sheffield Teaching Hospitals NHS Foundation Trust
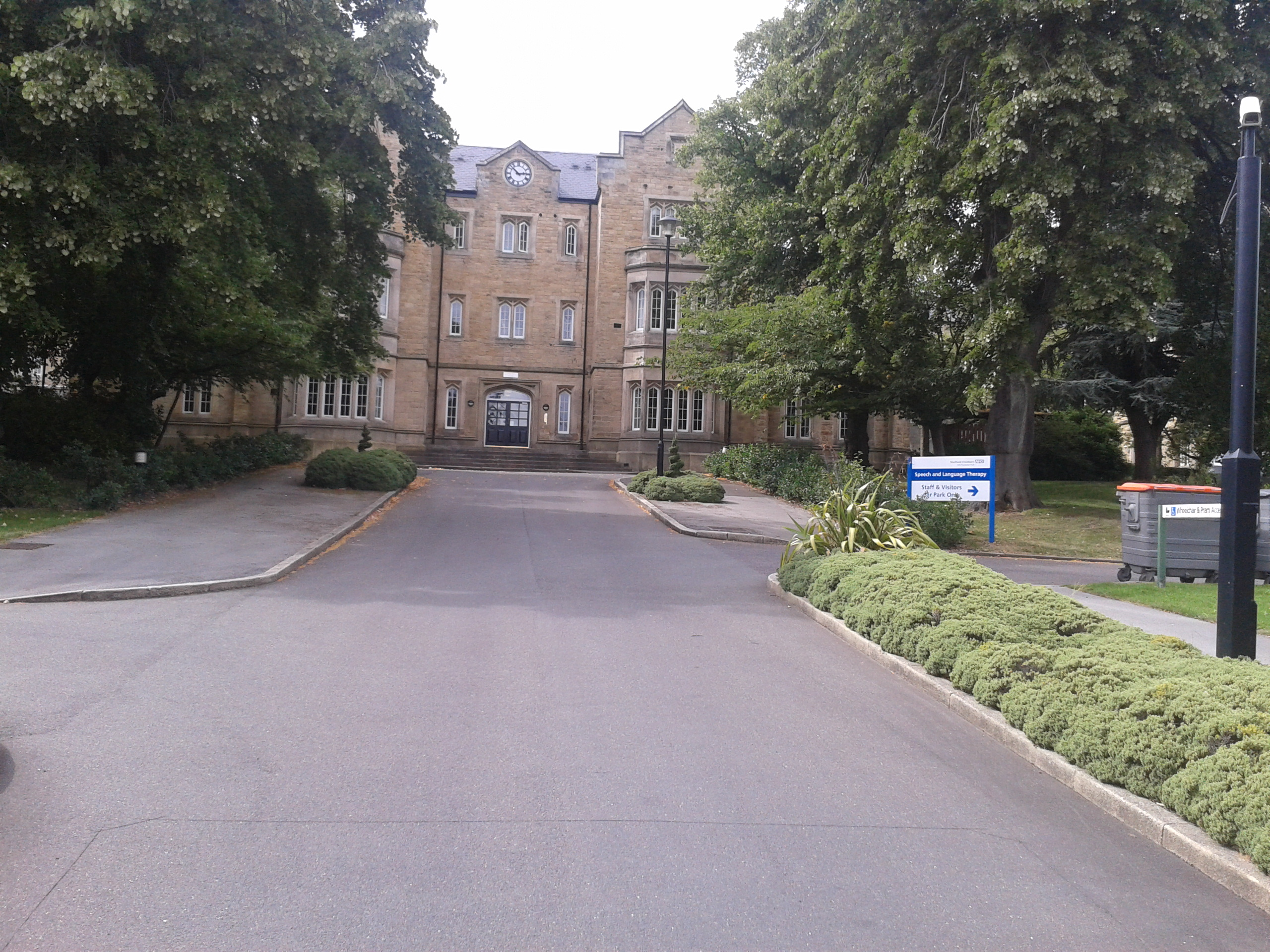
- The Kingswood Building

- Shown in South Yorkshire

Geography
- Location: Union Road, Nether Edge, Sheffield, South Yorkshire, United Kingdom
- Coordinates: 53.3609°N 1.4982°W

Organisation
- Care system: Public NHS

Services
- Emergency department: No Accident & Emergency

History
- Founded: 1844
- Closed: 1990

Links
- Lists: Hospitals in the United Kingdom

The Nether Edge Hospital was a health facility on Union Road, in Nether Edge near Sheffield, South Yorkshire. The main building, known as the Kingswood Building, remains a Grade II listed building.

== History ==
The facility has its origins in the Ecclesall Bierlow Union Workhouse which was designed by William Flockton and opened in 1844.

In December 1940, during the Second World War, the dining hall and nurses' home were damaged by enemy bombing.

It became Nether Edge Hospital in 1929 and joined the National Health Service in 1948. The main hospital closed in 1990 and most of the site was acquired by Gleeson Homes in 1997 and subsequently developed for residential use. Some of the newer buildings, located off Osborne Road, were retained by the NHS and amalgamated to form the Michael Carlisle Centre which was officially opened as a mental health facility by the Duchess of Gloucester in October 1999.

== Gallery ==
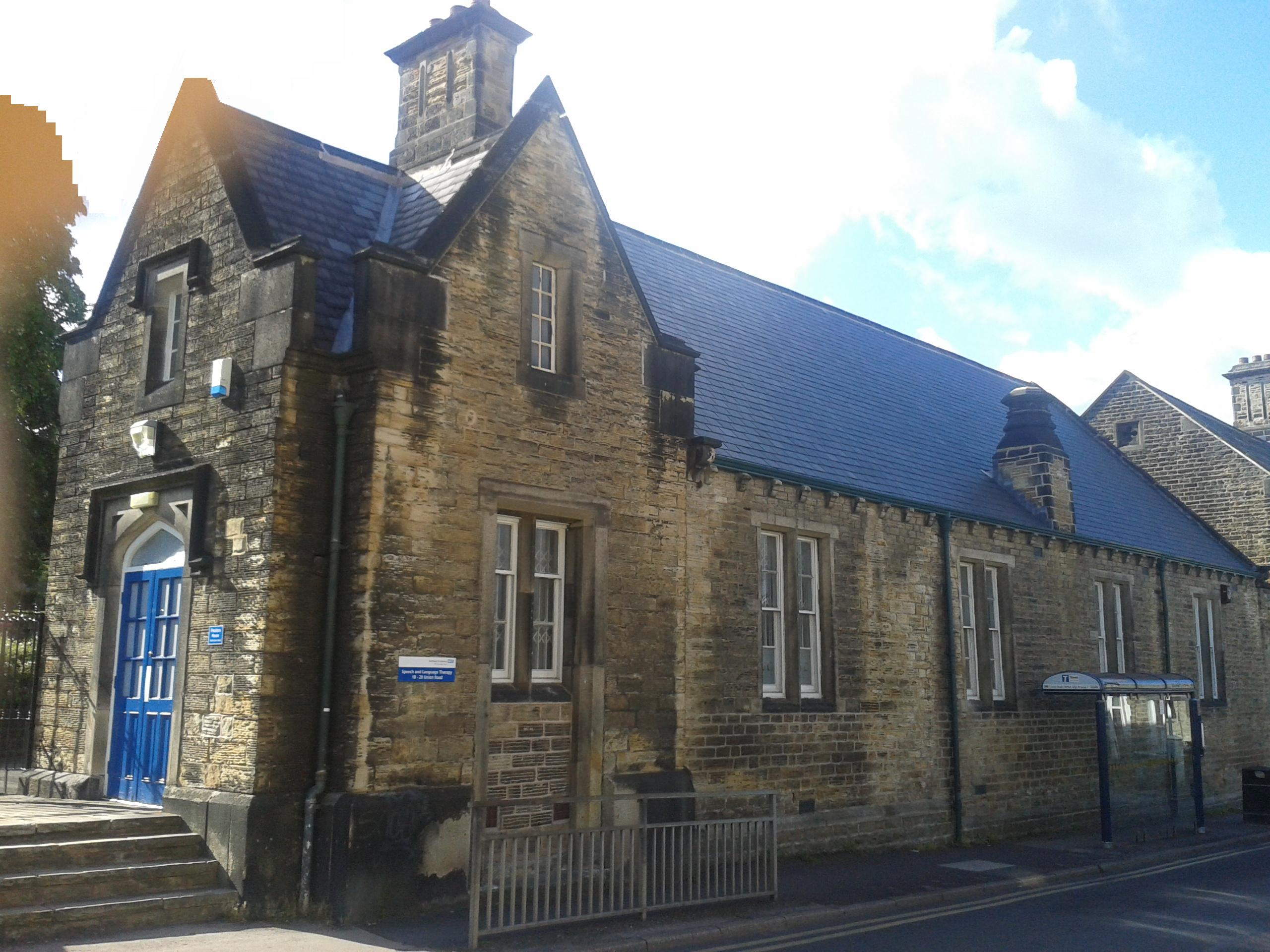
The Right Lodge

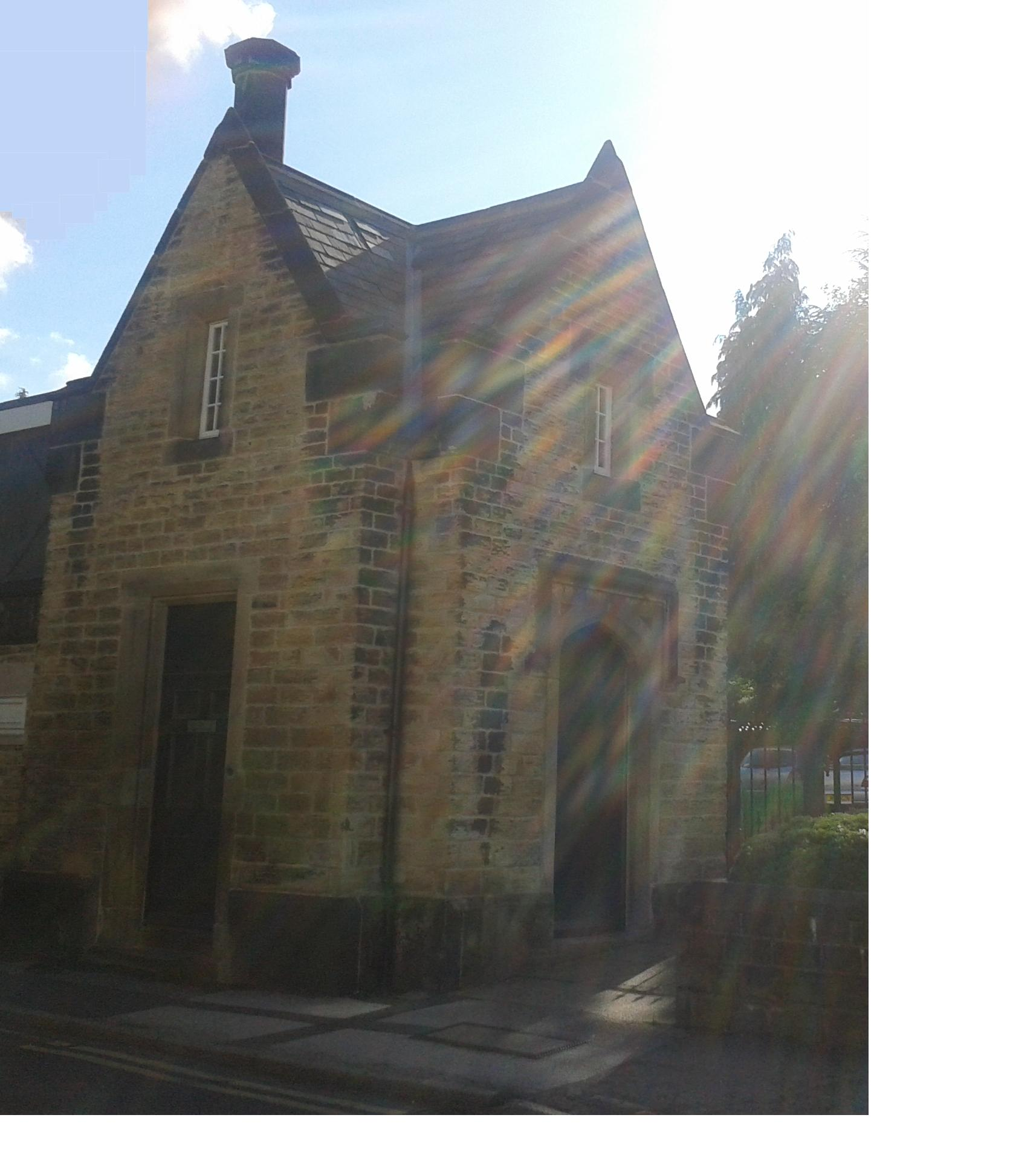
The Left Lodge

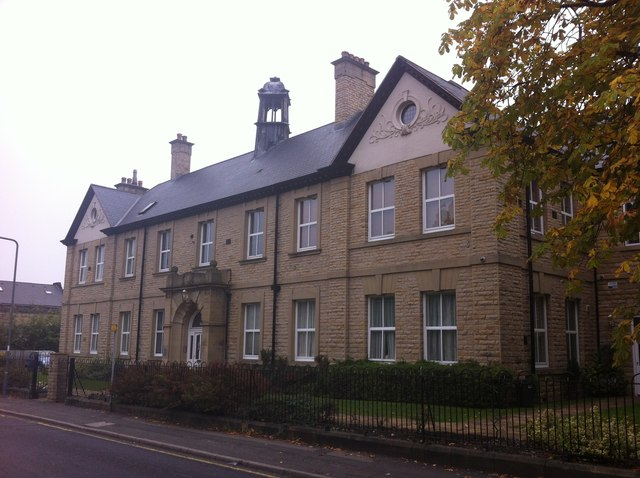
The workhouse offices
