= 1968 Sheffield Brightside by-election =

UK Parliamentary by-election

The 1968 Sheffield Brightside by-election of 13 June 1968 was held following the death of Labour MP Richard Winterbottom. The seat was very safe, having been won by Labour at the 1966 general election by over 19,000 votes

== Candidates ==
- Labour chose Edward Griffiths to defend their seat, who was an industrial chemist and a worker director at the British Steel Corporation
- Colin Renfrew, for the Conservatives, was lecturer in the Department of Prehistory and Archaeology at the University of Sheffield
- Robert Wilkinson was chosen as the candidate for the Communists
- Ronald Guest, and Lt-Col H L Lambert, stood as independents.

== Result of the previous general election ==
General election 1966: Sheffield Brightside
Party	Candidate	Votes	%	±%
Labour	Richard Winterbottom	26,653	75.90	+5.2
Conservative	Raymond Hadfield	7,476	21.29	−4.5
Communist	Howard Hill	989	2.82	−0.7
Majority		19,177	54.61	+9.7
Turnout		35,118	66.2	−4.1
Labour hold		Swing		

== Result of the by-election ==
The Labour Party held the seat with a much diminished majority.

By-election 1968: Sheffield Brightside
Party	Candidate	Votes	%	±%
Labour	Edward Griffiths	14,179	55.21	−20.69
Conservative	Colin Renfrew	8,931	34.77	+13.48
Communist	Robert Wilkinson	1,069	4.16	+1.34
Independent	Ronald Guest	918	3.60	New
Independent	H. L. Lambert	586	2.30	New
Majority		5,248	20.44	−34.17
Turnout		25,683		
Labour hold		Swing		
