= 1930 Sheffield Brightside by-election =

UK Parliamentary by-election

Arthur Ponsonby

The 1930 Sheffield Brightside by-election was held on 6 February 1930. The by-election was held due to the elevation to the peerage of the incumbent Labour MP, Arthur Ponsonby. It was won by the Labour candidate Fred Marshall.

== Previous result and background ==
General election 1929 Electorate 47,521
Party	Candidate	Votes	%	±%
Labour	Arthur Ponsonby	20,277	55.2	−0.2
Conservative	R. I. Money	9,828	26.8	−17.8
Liberal	William Ashcroft Lambert	6,621	18.0	New
Majority		10,449	28.4	+17.6
Turnout		36,726	77.3	−1.6
Labour hold		Swing		

Ponsonby had held the seat for Labour since 1922. At the 1929 election he had increased his majority over the second-placed Conservatives from 3,345 votes to over 10,000.

== Candidates ==
- The Liberal Party ran William Ashcroft Lambert, a Sheffield solicitor and City Councillor. He had been Liberal candidate here at the last general election
- Fred Marshall (Labour Party), an Alderman and wagon builder.
- J. T. Murphy (Communist Party)
- F. Hamer Russell (Conservative Party), a builders merchant. Russell had been a member of the Liberal Party for 25 years until 1928 when he defected to the Conservatives.

== Result ==
Sheffield Brightside by-election, 1930
Party	Candidate	Votes	%	±%
Labour	Fred Marshall	11,543	46.37	−8.85
Conservative	Hamer Russell	8,612	34.60	+7.84
Liberal	William Ashcroft Lambert	3,650	14.66	−3.34
Communist	J. T. Murphy	1,084	4.35	+4.35
Majority		2,931	11.77	
Turnout		24889	52.00	−25.3
Labour hold		Swing		

== Aftermath ==
While Marshall retained the seat for Labour, he would lose it to Russell at the following year's general election. Four years later the pair fought each other for a third time at the 1935 general election, and Marshall regained the seat.

== See also ==
- List of United Kingdom by-elections (1918–1931)
