= 1886 Sheffield Brightside by-election =

UK parliamentary by-election

The 1886 Sheffield Brightside by-election was a parliamentary by-election held for the British House of Commons constituency of Sheffield Brightside in the West Riding of Yorkshire on 9 February 1886.

== Vacancy ==
Under the provisions of the Succession to the Crown Act 1707 and a number of subsequent Acts, MPs appointed to certain ministerial and legal offices were at this time required to seek re-election. The by-election in Sheffield was caused by the appointment to the Cabinet of the sitting Liberal MP, Anthony John Mundella as President of the Board of Trade.

== Candidates ==
Mundella had been the MP for Sheffield Brightside since 1885 and before that had represented Sheffield since 1868. He had held a number of government posts before and sought re-election again now as President of the Board of Trade. Although he had been opposed by the Conservative Lord Edmund Talbot in 1885, the Tories did not wish to contest Mundella’s appointment to the government and there being no other nominations, Mundella was returned unopposed.

== The result ==
Sheffield Brightside by-election, 1886
Party	Candidate	Votes	%	±%
Liberal	Anthony John Mundella	Unopposed	N/A	N/A
Liberal hold				

== See also ==
- List of United Kingdom by-elections
- United Kingdom by-election records
