= James Hope, 1st Baron Rankeillour =

British politician (1870–1949)

The Right Honourable The Lord Rankeillour PC
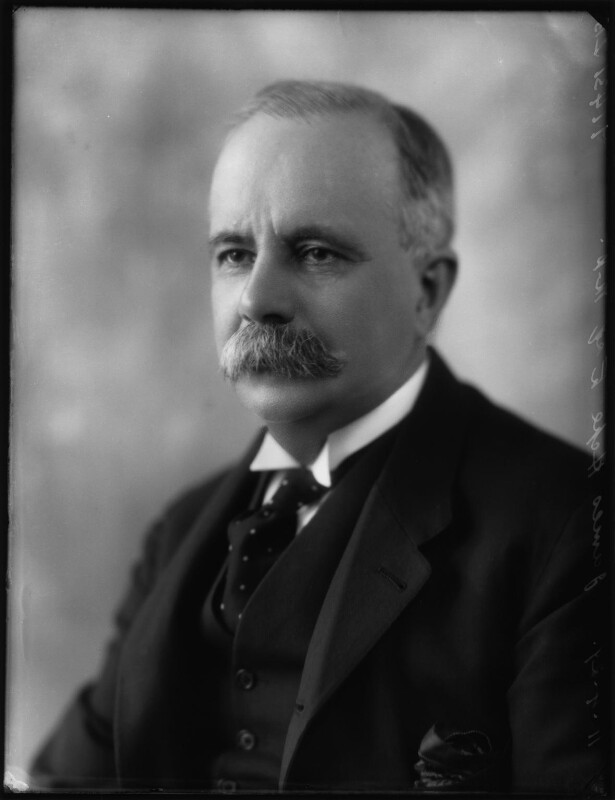
- Hope in 1929

Deputy Speaker of the House of Commons Chairman of Ways and Means
- In office 9 December 1924 – 30 May 1929
- Monarch: George V
- Speaker: John Henry Whitley; Edward FitzRoy
- Preceded by: Robert Young
- Succeeded by: Robert Young
- In office 29 April 1921 – 12 February 1924
- Monarch: George V
- Speaker: John Henry Whitley
- Preceded by: John Henry Whitley
- Succeeded by: Robert Young

Parliamentary and Financial Secretary to the Ministry of Munitions
- In office 27 January 1919 – 31 March 1921
- Prime Minister: David Lloyd George
- Preceded by: Laming Worthington-Evans
- Succeeded by: Office abolished

Lord Commissioner of the Treasury
- In office 14 December 1916 – 27 January 1919
- Prime Minister: David Lloyd George
- Preceded by: William Bridgeman
- Succeeded by: Robert Sanders

Treasurer of the Household
- In office 30 May 1915 – 14 December 1916
- Prime Minister: H. H. Asquith
- Preceded by: Frederick Edward Guest
- Succeeded by: James Craig

Member of Parliament for Sheffield Central
- In office 21 April 1908 – 30 May 1929
- Preceded by: Howard Vincent
- Succeeded by: Philip Hoffman

Member of Parliament for Sheffield Brightside
- In office 24 October 1900 – 8 February 1906
- Preceded by: Fred Maddison
- Succeeded by: Tudor Walters

Personal details
- Born: James Fitzalan Hope; 11 December 1870
- Died: 14 February 1949 (aged 78)
- Party: Conservative
- Spouse(s): (1) Mabel Helen Riddell (d. 1938) (2) Lady Beatrice Moore (d. 1966)
- Education: Christ Church, Oxford

James Fitzalan Hope, 1st Baron Rankeillour, PC (11 December 1870 – 14 February 1949), was a British Conservative politician. He served as Chairman of Ways and Means from 1921 to 1924 and again from 1924 to 1929.

== Background and education ==
A member of the Hope family now headed by the Marquess of Linlithgow, Hope was the third but only surviving son of J. R. Hope-Scott, of Abbotsford House, and Lady Victoria Alexandrina Fitzalan-Howard, eldest daughter of Henry Fitzalan-Howard, 14th Duke of Norfolk. He was educated at The Oratory School and at Christ Church, Oxford.

== Political career ==
Hope was Conservative Member of Parliament for Sheffield Brightside from 1900 to 1906 and for Sheffield Central from 1908 to 1929. He was appointed a member of the Teachers′ Registration Council in late 1902. Hope served under H. H. Asquith as Treasurer of the Household from 1915 to 1916 and under David Lloyd George as a Lord of the Treasury from 1916 to 1919 and as Parliamentary and Financial Secretary to the Ministry of Munitions from 1919 to 1921, when that office was abolished. He was Chairman of Ways and Means (Deputy-Speaker of the House of Commons) from 1921 until February 1924 and again from December 1924 until 1929, when he fought and lost Walthamstow East. He was sworn of the Privy Council in the 1922 New Year Honours and raised to the peerage as Baron Rankeillour, of Buxted in the County of Sussex, in 1932.

== Family ==
Lord Rankeillour married, firstly, Mabel Helen Riddell, youngest daughter of Francis Henry Riddell, in 1892. They had three sons (two of whom succeeded in turn to the Barony) and one daughter. After his first wife's death in 1938, he married Lady Beatrice Minnie Ponsonby Moore, only daughter of Ponsonby William Moore, 9th Earl of Drogheda, and widow of Struan Robertson Kerr-Clark, in 1941.

He died in February 1949, aged 78, and was succeeded by his eldest son, Arthur. Lady Rankeillour died in May 1966. Their younger son, Henry John, succeeded his brother to the title and estate in 1958.

Parliament of the United Kingdom
Preceded by Fred Maddison	Member of Parliament for Sheffield Brightside; 1900–1906	Succeeded by Tudor Walters
Preceded by Sir Howard Vincent	Member of Parliament for Sheffield Central; 1908–1929	Succeeded by Philip Hoffman
Political offices
Preceded by Frederick Edward Guest	Treasurer of the Household; 1915–1916	Succeeded by James Craig
Preceded by Sir Laming Worthington-Evans, Bt	Parliamentary and Financial Secretary to the Ministry of Munitions; 1919–1921	Office abolished
Preceded by J. H. Whitley	Chairman of Ways and Means; 1921–1924	Succeeded by Robert Young
Preceded by Robert Young	Chairman of Ways and Means; 1924–1929	Succeeded by Robert Young
Peerage of the United Kingdom
New creation	Baron Rankeillour; 1932–1949	Succeeded by Arthur Hope
