= Parliamentary constituencies in West Yorkshire =

List of Parliamentary constituencies in West Yorkshire, England

The English ceremonial county of West Yorkshire is divided into 24 parliamentary constituencies: 12 borough constituencies and 12 county constituencies, two of which are partly in North Yorkshire.

== Constituencies ==
†Conservative ¥Green ‡Labour ¤Reform UK

Name (Note: BC denotes borough constituency, CC denotes county constituency.)	Electorate	Majority (Note: The majority is the number of votes the winning candidate receives more than their nearest rival.)	Member of Parliament	Nearest opposition	Map
Bradford East BC	75,167	6,189	Imran Hussain‡	Talat Sajawal (Independent)	A medium-sized constituency located in the south east of the county.
Bradford South BC	70,999	4,362	Judith Cummins‡	Ian Eglin¤	A medium-sized constituency, located to the north of the centre of the county. It is entirely bounded by other constituencies in the county.
Bradford West BC	77,897	707	Naz Shah‡	Muhammed Islam (Independent)	A medium-to-large constituency, located in the southeast of the county.
Calder Valley CC	77,364	8,991	Josh Fenton-Glynn‡	Vanessa Lee†	A small constituency, located in the centre of the county, to the east of two other small constituencies.
Colne Valley CC	72,638	4,963	Paul Davies‡	Jason McCartney†	A small constituency, located in the centre of the county to the south of two equally small constituencies.
Dewsbury and Batley CC	71,685	6,934	Iqbal Mohamed (Independent)	Heather Iqbal‡	A small constituency, situated in the centre of the county to the west of two similarly sized constituencies.
Halifax BC	77,516	6,269	Kate Dearden‡	Hazel Sharp†	A medium-sized constituency situated in the north west of the county.
Huddersfield BC	77,795	4,533	Harpreet Uppal‡	Andrew Cooper¥	A large constituency in the south of the county.
Keighley and Ilkley CC	74,130	1,625	Robbie Moore†	John Grogan‡	A small constituency, situated in the centre of the county to the west of two similarly sized constituencies.
Leeds Central and Headingley BC	70,554	8,422	Alex Sobel‡	Chris Foren¥	A small-to-medium-sized constituency in the north of the county.
Leeds East CC	76,207	11,265	Richard Burgon‡	David Dresser¤	A medium-sized constituency situated in the north west of the county.
Leeds North East BC	71,994	16,083	Fabian Hamilton‡	Chris Whiteside†	A very large constituency. It consists of the eastern portion of the county. It also includes the entirety of a second, smaller county, located to the east of the larger county.
Leeds North West CC	71,592	11,896	Katie White‡	Thomas Averre†	A large constituency in the south of the county.
Leeds South BC	71,994	11,279	Hilary Benn‡	Ed Carlisle¥	A small-to-medium-sized constituency in the north of the county.
Leeds South West and Morley BC	71,854	8,423	Mark Sewards‡	Andrea Jenkyns†	A large constituency in the south of the county.
Leeds West and Pudsey BC	70,069	12,392	Rachel Reeves‡	Lee Farmer†	A large constituency in the south of the county.
Normanton and Hemsworth CC	75,645	6,662	Jon Trickett‡	Callum Bushrod¤	A small-to-medium-sized constituency in the north of the county.
Ossett and Denby Dale CC	72,312	4,542	Jade Botterill‡	Mark Eastwood†	A small-to-medium-sized constituency in the north of the county.
Pontefract, Castleford and Knottingley CC	74,618	6,630	Yvette Cooper‡	John Thomas¤	A medium-sized constituency situated in the north west of the county.
Selby CC (Note: Cross-county constituency with North Yorkshire)	78,043	10,195	Keir Mather‡	Charles Richardson†	
Shipley CC	74,130	8,603	Anna Dixon‡	Philip Davies†	A large constituency in the south of the county.
Spen Valley BC	72,642	6,188	Kim Leadbeater‡	Sarah Wood¤	A large constituency in the south of the county.
Wakefield and Rothwell BC	75,067	9,346	Simon Lightwood‡	David Dews¤	A large constituency in the south of the county.
Wetherby and Easingwold CC	74,314	4,846	Alec Shelbrooke†	Ben Pickles‡	

== Boundary changes ==
=== 2024 ===
See 2023 review of Westminster constituencies for further details.

Name (2010-2024)	Boundaries 2010-2024	Name (2024-present)	Boundaries 2024-present
1. Batley and Spen BC; 2. Bradford East BC; 3. Bradford South BC; 4. Bradford West BC; 5. Calder Valley CC; 6. Colne Valley CC; 7. Dewsbury CC; 8. Elmet and Rothwell CC; 9. Halifax BC; 10. Hemsworth CC; 11. Huddersfield BC; 12. Keighley CC; 13. Leeds Central BC; 14. Leeds East BC; 15. Leeds North East BC; 16. Leeds North West BC; 17. Leeds West BC; 18. Morley and Outwood BC; 19. Normanton, Pontefract and Castleford CC; 20. Pudsey BC; 21. Shipley CC; 22. Wakefield CC	Parliamentary constituencies in West Yorkshire (2010-2024)	1. Bradford North BC; 2. Bradford South BC; 3. Bradford West BC; 4. Calder Valley CC; 5. Colne Valley CC; 6. Dewsbury and Batley CC; 7. Halifax BC; 8. Huddersfield BC; 9. Keighley and Ilkley CC; 10. Leeds Central and Headingley BC; 11. Leeds East CC; 12. Leeds North East BC; 13. Leeds North West CC; 14. Leeds South BC; 15. Leeds South West and Morley BC; 16. Leeds West and Pudsey BC; 17. Normanton and Hemsworth CC; 18. Ossett and Denby Dale CC; 19. Pontefract, Castleford and Knottingley CC; 20. Selby CC; 21. Shipley CC; 22. Spen Valley BC; 23. Wakefield and Rothwell BC; 24. Wetherby and Easingwold CC	Parliamentary constituencies in West Yorkshire (2024-present)

For the 2023 review of Westminster constituencies, which redrew the constituency map ahead of the 2024 United Kingdom general election, the Boundary Commission for England opted to combine West Yorkshire with North Yorkshire as a sub-region of the Yorkshire and the Humber Region, resulting in the creation of two new cross-county boundary constituencies: Selby which comprises the majority of the former North Yorkshire district of Selby and includes the City of Leeds ward of Kippax and Methley; and a new constituency named Wetherby and Easingwold which includes the City of Leeds wards of Harewood and Wetherby.

As a consequence, the following changes were also made: Elmet and Rothwell was abolished; Wakefield was reconfigured to include the towns of Rothwell and Outwood and is renamed Wakefield and Rothwell; Morley and Outwood became Leeds South West and Morley; a new constituency named Ossett and Denby Dale was created; and the town of Normanton was transferred from Normanton, Pontefract and Castleford to Hemsworth, resulting in the two new constituencies of Pontefract, Castleford and Knottingley, and Normanton and Hemsworth.

Elsewhere, Batley and Spen, and Dewsbury were realigned to form Dewsbury and Batley, and Spen Valley, and Leeds West and Pudsey were abolished, with parts of each forming Leeds West and Pudsey. Leeds Central effectively became Leeds South and a new constituency named Leeds Central and Headingley was created. Although its boundaries were unchanged, it was proposed that Keighley be renamed Keighley and Ilkley.

The following constituencies resulted from the boundary review:

Covering electoral wards within Bradford

- Bradford East
- Bradford South
- Bradford West
- Keighley and Ilkley
- Shipley

Covering electoral wards within Calderdale

- Calder Valley
- Halifax

Covering electoral wards within Kirklees

- Colne Valley
- Dewsbury and Batley
- Huddersfield
- Ossett and Denby Dale (part)
- Spen Valley

Covering electoral wards within Leeds

- Leeds Central and Headingley
- Leeds East
- Leeds North East
- Leeds North West
- Leeds South
- Leeds South West and Morley
- Leeds West and Pudsey
- Selby (also contains part of the North Yorkshire district of Selby)
- Wakefield and Rothwell (part)
- Wetherby and Easingwold (also contains parts of the North Yorkshire borough of Harrogate and districts of Hambleton and Selby)

Covering electoral wards within Wakefield

- Normanton and Hemsworth
- Ossett and Denby Dale (part)
- Pontefract, Castleford and Knottingley
- Wakefield and Rothwell (part)

=== 2010 ===
Under the fifth periodic review of Westminster constituencies, the Boundary Commission for England decided to reduce the number of seats in West Yorkshire from 23 to 22, leading to significant changes in the Cities of Leeds and Wakefield, with the abolition of Elmet, Morley and Rothwell, Normanton, and Pontefract and Castleford and the creation of Elmet and Rothwell, Morley and Outwood, and Normanton, Pontefract and Castleford. Bradford North was renamed Bradford East.

Name (1997-2010)	Boundaries 1997-2010	Name (2010-2024)	Boundaries 2010–2024
1. Batley and Spen BC; 2. Bradford North BC; 3. Bradford South BC; 4. Bradford West BC; 5. Calder Valley CC; 6. Colne Valley CC; 7. Dewsbury CC; 8. Elmet CC; 9. Halifax BC; 10. Hemsworth CC; 11. Huddersfield BC; 12. Keighley CC; 13. Leeds Central BC; 14. Leeds East BC; 15. Leeds North East BC; 16. Leeds North West BC; 17. Leeds West BC; 18. Morley and Rothwell BC; 19. Normanton CC; 20. Pontefract and Castleford CC; 21. Pudsey BC; 22. Shipley CC; 23. Wakefield CC	Former parliamentary constituencies in West Yorkshire	1. Batley and Spen BC; 2. Bradford East BC; 3. Bradford South BC; 4. Bradford West BC; 5. Calder Valley CC; 6. Colne Valley CC; 7. Dewsbury CC; 8. Elmet and Rothwell CC; 9. Halifax BC; 10. Hemsworth CC; 11. Huddersfield BC; 12. Keighley CC; 13. Leeds Central BC; 14. Leeds East BC; 15. Leeds North East BC; 16. Leeds North West BC; 17. Leeds West BC; 18. Morley and Outwood BC; 19. Normanton, Pontefract and Castleford CC; 20. Pudsey BC; 21. Shipley CC; 22. Wakefield CC	Current parliamentary constituencies in West Yorkshire

== Results history ==
Primary data source: House of Commons research briefing - General election results from 1918 to 2019

=== 2024 ===
The number of votes cast for each political party who fielded candidates in constituencies comprising West Yorkshire in the 2024 general election were as follows: (Note: Excludes the cross-county constituencies of Selby and Wetherby and Easingwold which have majority North Yorkshire electorates.)

Party	Votes	%	Change from 2019	Seats	Change from 2019
Labour	375,140	42.1%	▼3.9%	20	▲7
Conservative	176,335	19.8%	▼19.9%	1	▼8
Reform	144,656	16.2%	▲12.0%	0	0
Greens	82,445	9.3%	▲7.3%	0	0
Liberal Democrats	41,702	4.7%	▼1.4%	0	0
Others	70,020	7.9%	▲6.0%	1	▲1
Total	890,298	100.0		22	

=== Percentage votes ===
Election year	1983	1987	1992	1997	2001	2005	2010	2015	2017	2019	2024
Labour	35.7	41.0	45.5	54.0	51.6	45.9	37.4	42.2	53.3	46.0	42.1
Conservative	37.3	37.9	38.2	28.8	30.1	27.8	32.9	32.7	37.8	39.7	19.8
Reform	-	-	-	-	-	-	-	-	-	4.2	16.2
Green Party	-	*	*	*	*	*	1.0	3.6	1.0	2.0	9.3
Liberal Democrat^{1}	26.0	20.8	15.0	12.9	13.9	18.6	20.7	6.4	4.0	6.1	4.7
UKIP	-	-	-	*	*	*	1.3	13.6	1.8	*	*
Other	0.9	0.4	1.3	4.2	4.4	7.7	6.6	1.6	2.1	1.9	7.9

^{1}1983 & 1987 - SDP–Liberal Alliance

* Included in Other

=== Seats ===
Election year	1983	1987	1992	1997	2001	2005	2010	2015	2017	2019	2024
Labour	10	14	14	23	23	21	13	14	17	13	20
Conservative	11	9	9	0	0	1	7	7	5	9	1
Liberal Democrat^{1}	2	0	0	0	0	1	2	1	0	0	0
Independents	0	0	0	0	0	0	0	0	0	0	1
Total	23	23	23	23	23	23	22	22	22	22	22

^{1}1983 & 1987 - SDP–Liberal Alliance

=== Maps ===
==== 1885-1910 - West Riding of Yorkshire ====
1885

1886

1892

1895

1900

1906

Jan 1910

Dec 1910

==== 1918-1945 ====
1918

1922

1923

1924

1929

1931

1935

1945

==== 1950-1979 ====
1950

1951

1955

1959

1964

1966

1970

Feb 1974

Oct 1974

1979

==== 1983-2024 - West Yorkshire ====
1983

1987

1992

1997

2001

2005

2010

2015

2017

2019

==== 2024-present - West Yorkshire including two cross-county constituencies partly in North Yorkshire ====
2024

== Historical representation by party ==
Data given is for the West Riding of Yorkshire before 1983. A cell marked → (with a different colour background to the preceding cell) indicates that the previous MP continued to sit under a new party name.

=== 1885 to 1918 ===
==== Areas currently in North Yorkshire ====
Conservative Liberal Liberal Unionist

Constituency	1885	1886	1892	1895	1900	05	1906	Jan 1910	Dec 1910
Barkston Ash	Gunter					Andrews	Lane-Fox		
Ripon	Harker	Wharton					Lynch	Wood	
Skipton	M. Wilson	Morrison	Roundell	Morrison	Thomson		Clough		

==== Areas currently in West Yorkshire ====
Conservative Independent Labour Independent Liberal Labour Liberal Liberal-Labour Liberal Unionist

Constituency	1885	86	1886	88	1892	92	93	93	95	1895	96	97	99	1900	02	04	05	1906	06	07	08	09	Jan 1910	Dec 1910	11	15	16	17	18
Bradford Central	Forster	Shaw-Lefevre								Wanklyn								Robertson									Hill		
Bradford East	Holden		Reed		Caine					Reed	Greville							Priestley											
Bradford West	Illingworth									Flower								Jowett											
Colne Valley	Beaumont		→		Kitson															Grayson			Leach				Mallalieu		
Dewsbury	Simon			Oldroyd											Runciman														
Elland	Wayman												Trevelyan																
Halifax	Stansfeld									Arnold				Crossley				Parker											
Halifax	T. Shaw						W. Shaw					Billson		Whitley															
Huddersfield	Leatham		Summers				Crosland			Woodhouse									Sherwell										
Keighley	Holden									Brigg															Buckmaster	Smith			Somervell
Leeds Central	Balfour																	Armitage											
Leeds East	Dawson		Gane						Leuty					Cautley				O'Grady											
Leeds North	Jackson														R. Barran														
Leeds South	Playfair					Walton															Middlebrook								
Leeds West	Gladstone																						Harvey						
Morley	Gaskell				Hutton																		France						
Normanton	Pickard															Parrott	Hall					→							
Osgoldcross	Ramsden	→	Austin										→					Compton-Rickett											
Otley	Fairbairn		J. Barran							Wyvill				Duncan															
Pontefract	Winn						Reckitt	Nussey																Booth					
Pudsey	Priestley													Whiteley							Oddy		Ogden						
Shipley	Craven				Byles					Flannery								Illingworth								Partington			
Sowerby	Crossley				Mellor											Higham													
Spen Valley	Woodhead				Whittaker																								
Wakefield	Green				Charlesworth					W. Wentworth-Fitzwilliam					Brotherton									Marshall					

==== Areas currently in South Yorkshire ====
Conservative Labour Liberal Liberal-Labour Liberal Unionist

Constituency	1885	1886	88	89	1892	94	1895	97	99	1900	02	1906	08	09	Jan 1910	10	Dec 1910	12	14	15	16	17
Barnsley	Kenny			Compton				Walton														
Doncaster	Shirley		H. Wentworth-FitzWilliam		Fleming		Fison					C. Nicholson										
Hallamshire	Mappin											Wadsworth			→					→		
Holmfirth	H. Wilson																	Arnold				
Rotherham	Dyke Acland								Holland							Pease						Richardson
Sheffield Attercliffe	Coleridge					Langley								Pointer					Anderson			
Sheffield Brightside	Mundella							Maddison		Hope		Walters										
Sheffield Central	Vincent												Hope									
Sheffield Ecclesall	Ashmead-Bartlett										Roberts											
Sheffield Hallam	Stuart-Wortley																				Fisher	

=== 1918 to 1950 ===
Coalition Liberal (1918-22) / National Liberal (1922-23) Coalition National Democratic & Labour Common Wealth Conservative Independent Labour Liberal National Labour National Liberal (1931-68) Speaker

Constituency	1918	19	21	1922	23	1923	1924	25	28	1929	29	30	31	1931	32	33	34	1935	38	39	40	41	42	44	1945	46	47	49
Barkston Ash	Lane-Fox													Ropner														
Barnsley	Joseph Walton			Potts										Soper				Potts	Collindridge									
Batley and Morley	France			Turner			Forrest			Turner				Wills				Brooke		Beaumont								Broughton
Bradford Central	Ratcliffe			Leach			Gadie			Leach				Eady				Leach							Webb			
Bradford East	Loseby			Jowett			Fenby			Jowett				Hepworth											McLeavy			
Bradford North	Boyd-Carpenter					Rea	E. Ramsden			Angell				Ramsden											Nichol			
Bradford South	Willey			Spencer			Hirst							Holdsworth					→						Titterington			Craddock
Colne Valley	F. Mallalieu			Snowden									→	E. Mallalieu				Marklew		Hall								
Dewsbury	Pickering			Riley		Harvey	Riley							Rea				Riley							W. T. Paling			
Don Valley	James Walton			T. Williams																								
Doncaster	R. Nicholson			W. Paling										Molson				Short	Morgan			Walkden					→	
Elland	G. Ramsden			Robinson		Kay	Robinson			Buxton				Levy											Cobb			
Halifax	Whitley		→						Longbottom					Gledhill											Brook			
Hemsworth	Guest													Price			Griffiths									Holmes		
Huddersfield	Sykes			Marshall		Hudson								Mabane											J. Mallalieu			
Keighley	Clough			Lees-Smith		Pilkington	Lees-Smith							Harvie-Watt				Lees-Smith					Bulmer-Thomas					→
Leeds Central	Armitage			Willey	Wilson					Denman			→												Porter			
Leeds North	Farquharson			Butler		Beckett				Peake																		
Leeds North East	Birchall																				Craik-Henderson				Bacon			
Leeds South	Middlebrook			Charleton										Whiteside				Charleton							Gaitskell			
Leeds South East	O'Grady						Slesser				Milner																	
Leeds West	Harvey			→		Stamford								Adams											Stamford			Pannell
Normanton	Hall															T. Smith											Sylvester	
Penistone	Arnold		Gillis	Pringle			R. Smith							Glossop				McGhee										
Pontefract	Compton-Rickett		Forrest	T. Smith			Brooke			T. Smith				Sotheron-Estcourt				A. Hills				Barstow						
Pudsey and Otley	Barrand			Fawkes		Watson				Gibson															Stoddart-Scott			
Ripon	Wood							J. Hills												York								
Rother Valley	Grundy																	Dunn							Griffiths			
Rotherham	Kelley					Lindley								Herbert		Dobbie												
Rothwell	Lunn																						Brooks					
Spen Valley	Whittaker	Myers		Simon									→								Woolley				Sharp			
Sheffield Attercliffe	Casey			Wilson										Pike				Wilson						Hynd				
Sheffield, Brightside	Walters			Ponsonby								Marshall		Russell				Marshall										
Sheffield, Central	Hope									Hoffman				Boulton											Morris			
Sheffield, Ecclesall	S. Roberts					Harland				S. Roberts jnr								Ellis							P. Roberts			
Sheffield, Hallam	Vickers			Sykes					L. Smith											Jennings								
Sheffield, Hillsborough	Neal			Alexander										Braithwaite				Alexander										
Sheffield, Park	Stephenson			→		Deans				Lathan				Benn				Lathan					Burden					
Shipley	Rae					Mackinder						Lockwood						Creech Jones										
Skipton	Roundell						Bird									Rickards								Lawson	Drayson			
Sowerby	Barker			Simpson-Hinchliffe		A. Williams	Shaw			Tout				McCorquodale											Belcher			Houghton
Wakefield	Brotherton			Ellis		Sherwood	Ellis			Sherwood				Hillman	Greenwood													
Wentworth	Hirst															W. Paling												
Constituency	1918	19	21	1922	23	1923	1924	25	28	1929	29	30	31	1931	32	33	34	1935	38	39	40	41	42	44	1945	46	47	49

=== 1950 to 1983 ===
Conservative Labour Liberal National Liberal (1931-68) Social Democratic

Constituency	1950	50	1951	52	53	54	1955	56	59	1959	60	62	63	1964	1966	68	1970	73	Feb 1974	Oct 1974	76	78	1979	81
Leeds Central	Porter																							
Leeds North	Peake																							
Sheffield Neepsend	Morris	Soskice																						
Bradford East	McLeavy														Lyons									
Barkston Ash	Ropner													Alison										
Barnsley	Collindridge		Schofield		Mason																			
Batley and Morley	Broughton																						Woolmer	
Bradford Central / Brad W (1955)	Webb						Tiley								Haseldine		Wilkinson		Lyons					→
Bradford North	Taylor													Ford										
Bradford South	Craddock																Torney							
Brighouse and Spenborough	Cobb	Edwards									Shaw			Jackson			Proudfoot		Jackson				Waller	
Colne Valley	Hall												Duffy		R. Wainwright		Clark		R. Wainwright					
Dearne Valley	W. Paling									E. Wainwright														
Dewsbury	W. T. Paling									Ginsburg														→
Don Valley	Williams									Kelley													Welsh	
Doncaster	Gunter		Barber											Walker										
Halifax	Brook						Macmillan							Summerskill										
Harrogate	York					Ramsden													Banks					
Hemsworth	Holmes									Beaney									Woodall					
Huddersfield East	J. Mallalieu																						Sheerman	
Huddersfield West	Wade													Lomas									Dickens	
Keighley	Hobson									Worsley				Binns			Hall		Cryer					
Leeds North East	Bacon						Peake	Joseph																
Leeds North West	Kaberry																							
Leeds South	Gaitskell												Rees											
Leeds South East	Milner			Healey			Bacon										Cohen							
Leeds West	Pannell																		Dean					
Normanton	Brooks		Roberts																					
Penistone	McGhee								Mendelson													McKay		
Pontefract / & Castleford (1974)	Sylvester											Harper										Lofthouse		
Pudsey	Banks									Hiley									Shaw					
Ripon	Stoddart-Scott																	Austick	Hampson					
Rother Valley	Griffiths																Hardy							
Rotherham	Jones												O'Malley								Crowther			
Sheffield Attercliffe	Hynd																Duffy							
Sheffield Brightside	Winterbottom															Griffiths				Maynard				
Sheffield Hallam	Jennings									Osborn														
Sheffield Heeley	Roberts														Hooley		Spence		Hooley					
Sheffield Hillsborough	Darling																		Flannery					
Sheffield Park	Mulley																							
Shipley	Hirst																Fox							
Skipton	Drayson																						Watson	
Sowerby	Houghton																		Madden				Thompson	
Wakefield	Greenwood					Creech Jones								Harrison										
Leeds East							Healey																	
Constituency	1950	50	1951	52	53	54	1955	56	59	1959	60	62	63	1964	1966	68	1970	73	Feb 1974	Oct 1974	76	78	1979	81

=== 1983 to 2010 ===
Conservative Labour Liberal Liberal Democrats

Constituency	1983	1987	90	91	1992	94	96	1997	99	2001	2005
Batley and Spen	Peacock							Wood			
Bradford North	Lawler	Wall	Rooney								
Bradford South	Torney	Cryer				Sutcliffe					
Bradford West	Madden							Singh			
Calder Valley	Thompson							McCafferty			
Colne Valley	Wainwright	Riddick						Mountford			
Dewsbury	Whitfield	Taylor									Malik
Elmet	Batiste							Burgon			
Keighley	Waller							Cryer			
Leeds Central	Fatchett								Benn		
Leeds East	Healey				Mudie						
Leeds North East	Joseph	Kirkhope						Hamilton			
Leeds North West	Hampson							Best			Mulholland
Leeds West	Meadowcroft	Battle									
Halifax	Galley	Mahon									Riordan
Hemsworth	Woodall	Buckley		Enright			Trickett				
Huddersfield	Sheerman										
Morley & Leeds S / Morley & Rothwell ('97)	Rees				Gunnell					Challen	
Normanton	O'Brien										Balls
Pontefract and Castleford	Lofthouse							Cooper			
Pudsey	Shaw							Truswell			
Shipley	Fox							Leslie			Davies
Wakefield	Harrison	Hinchliffe									Creagh

=== 2010 to present ===
Conservative Independent Labour Liberal Democrats Respect

Constituency	2010	12	2015	16	2017	2019	21	22	2024
Batley and Spen / Spen Valley (2024)	Wood		Cox	Brabin			Leadbeater		
Bradford East	Ward		Hussain						
Bradford South	Sutcliffe		Cummins						
Bradford West	Singh	Galloway	Shah						
Calder Valley	Whittaker								Fenton-Glynn
Colne Valley	McCartney				Walker	McCartney			Davies
Dewsbury / Dewsbury & Batley (2024)	Reevell		Sherriff			Eastwood			Mohamed
Elmet and Rothwell^{1}	Shelbrooke								N/A
Halifax	Riordan		Lynch						Dearden
Hemsworth / Normanton & Hemsworth (2024)	Trickett								
Huddersfield	Sheerman								Uppal
Keighley / Keighley & Ilkley (2024)	Hopkins				Grogan	Moore			
Leeds Central / Leeds South (2024)	Benn								
Leeds East	Mudie		Burgon						
Leeds North East	Hamilton								
Leeds North West	Mulholland				Sobel				White
Leeds West / Leeds Central & Headingley (2024)	Reeves								Sobel
Morley & Outwood / Leeds SW & Morley (2024)	Balls		Jenkyns						Sewards
Normanton, Pontefract & Castleford / P., C. & Knottingley ('24)	Cooper								
Pudsey / Leeds West & Pudsey (2024)	Andrew								Reeves
Shipley	Davies								Dixon
Wakefield / Wakefield & Rothwell (2024)	Creagh					Ahmad Khan	→	Lightwood	
Ossett & Denby Dale									Botterill

^{1}parts transferred in 2024 to the new constituency of Wetherby & Easingwold which is mostly in North Yorkshire

== See also ==
- List of parliamentary constituencies in Yorkshire and the Humber
