= Pudsey and Otley =

Parliamentary constituency in the United Kingdom, 1918–1950

- Former county constituency for the House of Commons

1918–1950
- Seats: one
- Created from: Barkston Ash, Otley, Pudsey and Ripon
- Replaced by: Pudsey and Ripon

Pudsey and Otley was a parliamentary constituency centred on the towns of Pudsey and Otley in West Yorkshire. It returned one Member of Parliament (MP) to the House of Commons of the Parliament of the United Kingdom, elected by the first past the post system.

== History ==
The constituency was created for the 1918 general election, partially replacing the previous Pudsey and Otley constituencies. It was abolished for the 1950 general election, when it was largely replaced by a new Pudsey constituency while Otley became part of Ripon.

== Boundaries ==
The Municipal Borough of Pudsey, the Urban Districts of Burley-in-Wharfedale, Calverley, Farsley, Horsforth, Ilkley, Otley, and Rawdon, and part of the Rural District of Wharfedale.

== Members of Parliament ==
Election	Member	Party
1918	Arthur Barrand	Coalition Liberal
Jan 1922	Arthur Barrand	National Liberal
1922	Frederick Fawkes	Conservative
1923	Francis Watson	Conservative
1929	Granville Gibson	Conservative
1945	Malcolm Stoddart-Scott	Conservative
1950	constituency abolished	

== Election results ==
=== Elections in the 1910s ===
1918 general election: Pudsey and Otley
Party		Candidate	Votes	%
C	National Liberal	Arthur Barrand	13,860	75.2
	Labour	George Ripley Carter	4,583	24.8
Majority			9,277	50.4
Turnout			18,443	58.6
Registered electors			31,487	
	National Liberal win (new seat)			
C indicates candidate endorsed by the coalition government.

=== Elections in the 1920s ===
General election 1922: Pudsey and Otley
Party	Candidate	Votes	%	±%
Unionist	Frederick Fawkes	12,396	46.5	N/A
National Liberal	Arthur Barrand	8,439	31.7	–43.5
Labour	Percy Myers	5,818	21.8	–3.0
Majority		3,957	14.8	N/A
Turnout		26,653	82.0	+23.4
Registered electors		32,506		
Unionist gain from National Liberal		Swing		

General election 1923: Pudsey and Otley
Party	Candidate	Votes	%	±%
Unionist	Francis Watson	11,537	43.7	−2.8
Liberal	Tudor Walters	9,330	35.4	+3.7
Labour	Percy Myers	5,499	20.9	−0.9
Majority		2,207	8.3	−6.5
Turnout		26,366	79.1	−2.9
Registered electors		33,316		
Unionist hold		Swing	−3.3	

General election 1924: Pudsey and Otley
Party	Candidate	Votes	%	±%
Unionist	Francis Watson	14,090	51.0	+7.3
Labour	Percy Myers	7,001	25.3	+4.4
Liberal	Ernest Woodhead	6,545	23.7	−11.7
Majority		7,089	25.7	+17.4
Turnout		27,636	80.5	+1.4
Registered electors		34,334		
Unionist hold		Swing	+1.5	

General election 1929: Pudsey and Otley
Party	Candidate	Votes	%	±%
Unionist	Granville Gibson	16,729	41.0	−10.0
Labour	A W Brown	12,336	30.3	+5.0
Liberal	Hubert Houldsworth	11,685	28.7	+5.0
Majority		4,393	10.7	−15.0
Turnout		40,750	81.8	+1.3
Registered electors		49,796		
Unionist hold		Swing	−7.5	

=== Elections in the 1930s ===
General election 1931: Pudsey and Otley
Party	Candidate	Votes	%	±%
Conservative	Granville Gibson	31,701	76.0	+35.0
Labour	William Pickles	10,013	24.0	−6.3
Majority		21,688	52.0	+41.3
Turnout		41,714	79.9	−1.9
Conservative hold		Swing		

General election 14 November 1935: Pudsey and Otley
Party	Candidate	Votes	%	±%
Conservative	Granville Gibson	22,107	51.7	−24.3
Liberal	John Smuts	10,682	25.0	New
Labour	Lucy Cox	9,977	23.3	−0.7
Majority		11,425	26.7	−25.3
Turnout		42,766	76.0	−3.9
Conservative hold		Swing		

General Election 1939–40:

Another General Election was required to take place before the end of 1940. The political parties had been making preparations for an election to take place and by the Autumn of 1939, the following candidates had been selected;

- Conservative: Granville Gibson
- Liberal: John Smuts
- Labour: M. H. Wigglesworth, replaced by H. N. Penlington

=== Elections in the 1940s ===
General election 5 July 1945: Pudsey and Otley
Party	Candidate	Votes	%	±%
Conservative	Malcolm Stoddart-Scott	22,755	43.4	−8.3
Labour	Denis Healey	21,104	40.2	+16.9
Liberal	Terence Clarke	8,592	16.4	−8.6
Majority		1,651	3.2	−23.5
Turnout		52,451	78.8	+2.8
Conservative hold		Swing		
