= 1995 City of Bradford Metropolitan District Council election =

1995 UK local government election

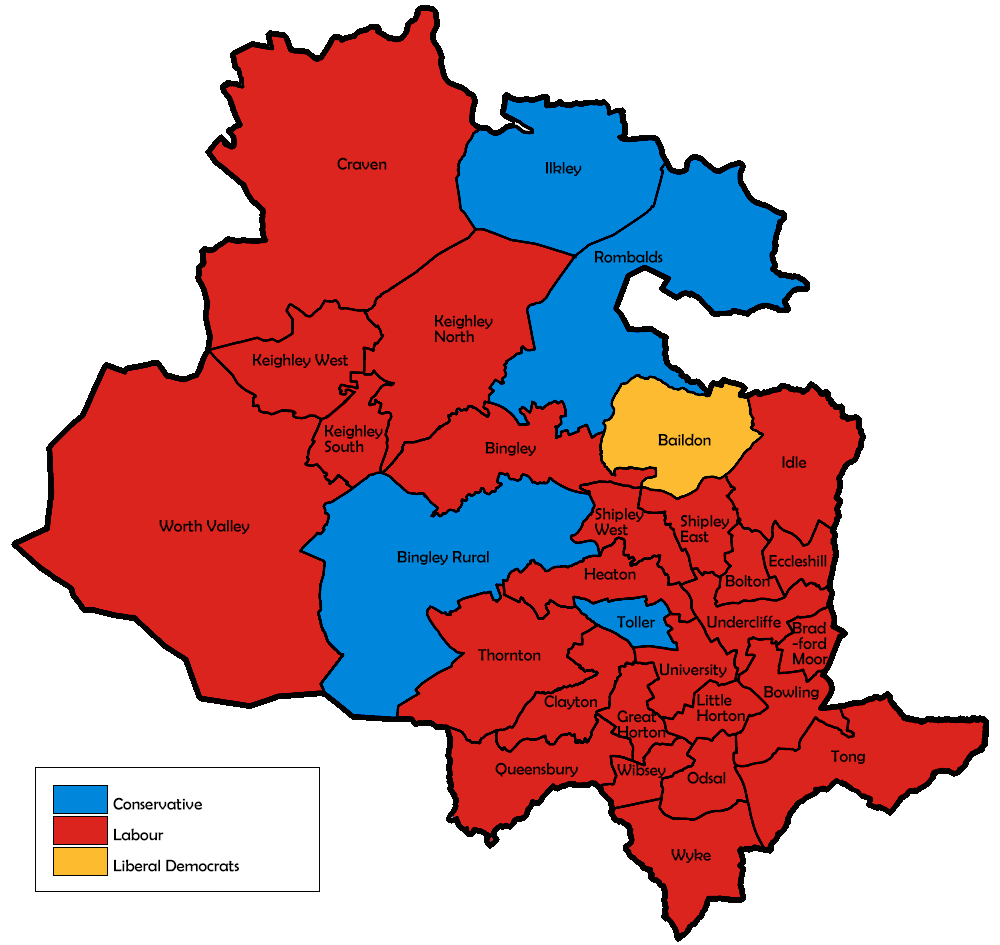
Map of the results for the 1995 Bradford council election.

The 1995 City of Bradford Metropolitan District Council elections were held on Thursday, 4 May 1995, with one third of the council up for election. Prior to the election there had been a by-election in Tong after incumbent Labour councillor, Gerry Sutcliffe, was selected as their candidate for the Bradford South by-election, which Labour successfully defended. Labour retained control of the council.

== Election results ==
Bradford local election result 1995
Party	Seats	Gains	Losses	Net gain/loss	Seats %	Votes %	Votes	+/−
Labour	25	9	1	▲8	83.3	54.4	69,751	+3.8
Conservative	4	1	9	▼8	13.3	28.5	36,565	-0.9
Liberal Democrats	1	1	1	Steady	3.3	13.8	17,626	-3.2
Green	0	0	0	Steady	0.0	1.9	2,484	-0.5
Independent Labour	0	0	0	Steady	0.0	0.8	1,002	+0.8
Militant Labour	0	0	0	Steady	0.0	0.2	312	+0.2
Independent	0	0	0	Steady	0.0	0.2	312	-0.5
Natural Law	0	0	0	Steady	0.0	0.0	46	+0.0

This result had the following consequences for the total number of seats on the council after the elections:

Party	Previous council	New council
Labour	50	58
Conservative	36	28
Liberal Democrat	4	4
Total	90	90
Working majority	10	26

== Ward results ==
Baildon
Party	Candidate	Votes	%	±%
Liberal Democrats	T. Browne	2,320	43.5	+7.1
Conservative	M. Hope	1,810	34.0	−5.0
Labour	H. Gundry	973	18.3	−1.2
Green	C. Harris	226	4.2	−0.9
Majority		510	9.6	+7.1
Turnout		5,329		
Liberal Democrats gain from Conservative		Swing	+6.0	

Bingley
Party	Candidate	Votes	%	±%
Labour	R. Flood	2,520	56.5	+10.1
Conservative	M. Startin	1,622	36.3	−0.5
Green	M. Thompson	321	7.2	+3.9
Majority		898	20.1	+10.6
Turnout		4,463		
Labour gain from Conservative		Swing	+5.3	

Bingley Rural
Party	Candidate	Votes	%	±%
Conservative	A. Cooke	1,917	43.	−3.5
Labour	M. Gregory	1,902	43.2	+8.8
Liberal Democrats	J. Hutton	581	13.2	−5.3
Majority		15	0.3	−12.4
Turnout		4,400		
Conservative hold		Swing	-6.1	

Bolton
Party	Candidate	Votes	%	±%
Labour	R. Kitson	1,664	42.2	+4.3
Liberal Democrats	H. Middleton	1,506	38.2	−2.1
Conservative	F. Lee	769	19.5	+0.5
Majority		158	4.0	+1.6
Turnout		3,939		
Labour gain from Conservative		Swing	+3.2	

Bowling
Party	Candidate	Votes	%	±%
Labour	M. Ali	1,932	51.4	−17.0
Independent Labour	D. Coughlin	1,002	26.7	+26.7
Liberal Democrats	J. Harrington	435	11.6	−3.6
Conservative	J. Ridyard	282	7.5	−1.2
Green	K. Spencer	104	2.8	−0.6
Majority		930	24.8	−28.4
Turnout		3,755		
Labour hold		Swing	-21.8	

Bradford Moor
Party	Candidate	Votes	%	±%
Labour	R. Virdee	1,826	44.3	−22.6
Conservative	S. Hussain	1,775	43.1	+21.7
Liberal Democrats	J. Collins	521	12.6	+3.4
Majority		51	1.2	−44.3
Turnout		4,122		
Labour hold		Swing	-22.1	

Clayton
Party	Candidate	Votes	%	±%
Labour	Y. Tough	2,332	50.7	−2.9
Conservative	R. Farley	1,825	39.7	−6.7
Liberal Democrats	L. McKeever	301	6.5	+6.5
Green	J. Robinson	140	3.0	+3.0
Majority		507	11.0	+3.7
Turnout		4,598		
Labour gain from Conservative		Swing	+1.9	

Craven
Party	Candidate	Votes	%	±%
Labour	E. McNally	2,030	45.0	+9.6
Conservative	D. Harrison	1,908	42.3	−1.3
Liberal Democrats	G. Morgan	568	12.6	−8.3
Majority		122	2.7	−5.5
Turnout		4,506		
Labour gain from Conservative		Swing	+5.4	

Eccleshill
Party	Candidate	Votes	%	±%
Labour	G. Midwood	2,024	60.4	+5.4
Conservative	P. Kewitz	876	26.2	+1.6
Liberal Democrats	M. Attenborough	449	13.4	−7.0
Majority		1,148	34.3	+3.8
Turnout		3,349		
Labour hold		Swing	+1.9	

Great Horton
Party	Candidate	Votes	%	±%
Labour	J. Godward	2,560	63.9	+3.3
Conservative	V. Binney	854	21.3	−2.9
Liberal Democrats	C. Wright	468	11.7	−1.2
Green	P. Mills	121	3.0	+0.8
Majority		1,706	42.6	+6.2
Turnout		4,003		
Labour hold		Swing	+3.1	

Heaton
Party	Candidate	Votes	%	±%
Labour	B. Maguire	3,109	61.8	+0.8
Conservative	G. Gidley	1,363	27.1	−5.0
Liberal Democrats	A. Cruden	383	7.6	+7.6
Green	P. Braham	174	3.5	−3.4
Majority		1,746	34.7	+5.9
Turnout		5,029		
Labour gain from Conservative		Swing	+2.9	

Idle
Party	Candidate	Votes	%	±%
Labour	K. Baxter	2,185	48.5	+8.1
Liberal Democrats	C. Beardmore	1,700	37.7	−8.2
Conservative	A. White	621	13.8	+0.1
Majority		485	10.8	+5.3
Turnout		4,506		
Labour gain from Liberal Democrats		Swing	+8.1	

Ilkley
Party	Candidate	Votes	%	±%
Conservative	B. Smith	2,585	55.8	+7.7
Labour	R. Fox	2,050	44.2	+26.9
Majority		535	11.5	−19.3
Turnout		4,635		
Conservative hold		Swing	-9.6	

Keighley North
Party	Candidate	Votes	%	±%
Labour	M. Slater	2,995	63.0	+8.9
Conservative	J. Cope	1,213	25.5	−6.7
Liberal Democrats	A. Carter	548	11.5	−2.3
Majority		1,782	37.5	+15.6
Turnout		4,756		
Labour hold		Swing	+7.8	

Keighley South
Party	Candidate	Votes	%	±%
Labour	B. Hancock	2,625	74.5	+5.5
Liberal Democrats	J. Brooksbank	484	13.7	+0.5
Conservative	R. Moorehouse	414	11.7	−6.0
Majority		2,141	60.8	+9.6
Turnout		3,523		
Labour hold		Swing	+2.5	

Keighley West
Party	Candidate	Votes	%	±%
Labour	B. Thorne	2,770	65.5	+8.5
Conservative	G. Smith	923	21.8	−5.5
Liberal Democrats	D. Burslam	537	12.7	−3.0
Majority		1,847	43.7	+14.0
Turnout		4,230		
Labour hold		Swing	+7.0	

Little Horton
Party	Candidate	Votes	%	±%
Labour	I. Greenwood	2,443	71.4	+9.2
Conservative	T. Gledhill	347	10.1	−8.8
Militant Labour	H. Oakes	312	9.1	+9.1
Liberal Democrats	A. Griffiths	251	7.3	−7.1
Green	C. Smith	66	1.9	−2.4
Majority		2,096	61.3	+17.9
Turnout		3,419		
Labour hold		Swing	+9.0	

Odsal
Party	Candidate	Votes	%	±%
Labour	D. Green	2,971	65.5	+7.6
Conservative	D. Manogue	932	20.5	−4.7
Liberal Democrats	K. Hall	518	11.4	−2.0
Green	P. Harrison	116	2.6	−0.9
Majority		2,039	44.9	+12.2
Turnout		4,537		
Labour hold		Swing	+6.1	

Queensbury
Party	Candidate	Votes	%	±%
Labour	J. Womersley	3,011	65.2	+9.9
Conservative	M. Blundell	1,078	23.3	−4.8
Liberal Democrats	J. Saul	483	10.5	−6.1
Natural Law	G. Clark	46	1.0	+1.0
Majority		1,933	41.9	+14.8
Turnout		4,618		
Labour hold		Swing	+7.3	

Rombalds
Party	Candidate	Votes	%	±%
Conservative	R. Wightman	2,114	43.7	−1.4
Labour	A. Niland	1,505	31.1	+3.7
Liberal Democrats	A. Micklem	1,216	25.1	−2.3
Majority		609	12.6	−5.1
Turnout		4,835		
Conservative hold		Swing	-2.5	

Shipley East
Party	Candidate	Votes	%	±%
Labour	R. Redfern	2,328	67.0	+9.7
Conservative	D. Servant	525	15.1	−1.9
Liberal Democrats	J. Hall	495	14.3	−5.3
Independent	M. Love	124	3.6	+3.6
Majority		1,803	51.9	+14.0
Turnout		3,472		
Labour hold		Swing	+5.3	

Shipley West
Party	Candidate	Votes	%	±%
Labour	J. Reilly	2,721	50.5	+1.5
Conservative	J. Carroll	1,830	34.0	−0.7
Green	D. Ford	446	8.3	+3.5
Liberal Democrats	C. Svensgaard	388	7.2	−4.3
Majority		891	16.5	+2.3
Turnout		5,385		
Labour gain from Conservative		Swing	+1.1	

Thornton
Party	Candidate	Votes	%	±%
Labour	P. Longthorn	2,002	51.7	+5.2
Conservative	J. Buffham	1,344	34.7	−2.9
Liberal Democrats	H. Wright	409	10.6	−2.2
Green	M. Rawnsley	116	3.0	−0.2
Majority		658	17.0	+8.1
Turnout		3,871		
Labour gain from Conservative		Swing	+4.0	

Toller
Party	Candidate	Votes	%	±%
Conservative	A. Hussain	2,618	46.3	+11.3
Labour	S. Hussain	2,464	43.6	−5.9
Liberal Democrats	S. Devonshire	448	7.9	−4.2
Green	N. Taimuri	123	2.2	−1.2
Majority		154	2.7	−11.8
Turnout		5,653		
Conservative gain from Labour		Swing	+8.6	

Tong
Party	Candidate	Votes	%	±%
Labour	T. Mahon	1,908	77.4	+5.9
Conservative	D. Jagger	336	13.6	+1.3
Liberal Democrats	K. Robinson	221	9.0	−3.6
Majority		1,572	63.8	+4.9
Turnout		2,465		
Labour hold		Swing	+2.3	

Undercliffe
Party	Candidate	Votes	%	±%
Labour	D. Fairfax	2,432	67.6	+5.0
Conservative	M. Matloob	508	14.1	−4.9
Liberal Democrats	E. Hallman	472	13.1	−2.1
Independent	R. Johnson	188	5.2	+5.2
Majority		1,924	53.4	+9.9
Turnout		3,600		
Labour hold		Swing	+4.9	

University
Party	Candidate	Votes	%	±%
Labour	A. Ahmed	3,472	68.4	−11.1
Conservative	I. Ahmed	1,074	21.1	+10.2
Green	N. Tart	531	10.5	+0.8
Majority		2,398	47.2	−21.3
Turnout		5,077		
Labour hold		Swing	-10.6	

Wibsey
Party	Candidate	Votes	%	±%
Labour	R. Berry	2,578	65.3	+1.1
Conservative	D. Craven	890	22.5	+1.0
Liberal Democrats	B. Boulton	480	12.2	−2.2
Majority		1,688	42.8	+0.1
Turnout		3,948		
Labour hold		Swing	+0.0	

Worth Valley
Party	Candidate	Votes	%	±%
Labour	M. Young	2,027	46.1	+9.8
Conservative	M. Ellis	1,495	34.0	−2.1
Liberal Democrats	C. Brown	871	19.8	−7.7
Majority		532	12.1	+11.9
Turnout		4,393		
Labour gain from Conservative		Swing	+5.9	

Wyke
Party	Candidate	Votes	%	±%
Labour	M. Beeley	2,392	65.0	+7.6
Conservative	D. Owen	717	19.5	−7.5
Liberal Democrats	H. Boulton	573	15.6	−0.1
Majority		1,675	45.5	+15.1
Turnout		3,682		
Labour hold		Swing	+7.5	
