= Bradford South =

Parliamentary constituency in the United Kingdom, 1918 onwards

Coordinates: 53°46′N 1°46′W

- Borough constituency for the House of Commons
- Boundaries since 2024
- Boundary of Bradford South in Yorkshire and the Humber
- County: West Yorkshire
- Population: 101,545 (2011 census)
- Electorate: 69,667 (December 2019)
- Major settlements: Bradford

Current constituency
- Created: 1918
- Member of Parliament: Judith Cummins (Labour Party)
- Seats: One
- Created from: Elland

Bradford South is a constituency (Note: A borough constituency (for the purposes of election expenses and type of returning officer)) in West Yorkshire represented in the House of Commons of the UK Parliament since 2015 by Judith Cummins of the Labour Party. (Note: As with all constituencies, the constituency elects one Member of Parliament (MP) by the first past the post system of election at least every five years.)

== Constituency profile ==
The Bradford South constituency lies within the City of Bradford metropolitan borough in the county of West Yorkshire. It contains the suburban areas to the south of Bradford city centre, including Holme Wood, Bierley, Wibsey and Great Horton, as well as the outlying villages of Wyke and Queensbury. The area has an industrial heritage; Bradford was once a global centre for textile manufacturing, particularly in the wool trade. Like much of post-industrial Northern England, Bradford has experienced economic decline with the decrease in importance of the textile industry.

The constituency contains areas with high deprivation, but is generally wealthier than the neighbouring constituencies of Bradford East and Bradford West. Compared to national averages, residents of Bradford South have low levels of income, education and professional employment. White people make up 70% of the population, which is lower than the national figure but higher than the rest of Bradford. Asians are the largest ethnic minority group, representing 22% of residents, most of whom are of Pakistani origin. Asians make up a majority of the population in some areas close to the city centre. Similarly to the rest of the city, most parts of Bradford South are represented by Labour Party or independent councillors at the local district council. Voters in the constituency strongly supported leaving the European Union in the 2016 referendum; an estimated 67% voted in favour of Brexit, one of the highest rates in the country.

== Boundaries ==
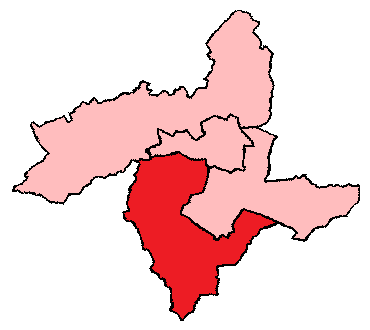
Bradford South boundaries within the City of Bradford 1918–1949

1918–1950: The County Borough of Bradford wards of Great Horton, Lister Hills, Little Horton, North Bierley East, and North Bierley West.

1950–1955: The County Borough of Bradford wards of Clayton, Great Horton, Lister Hills, North Bierley West, and Thornton.

1955–1974: The County Borough of Bradford wards of Clayton, North Bierley East, North Bierley West, and West Bowling, and the Urban District of Queensbury and Shelf.

1974–1983: The County Borough of Bradford wards of Clayton, Great Horton, Odsal, Tong, Wibsey, and Wyke, and the Urban District of Queensbury and Shelf.

1983–2010: The City of Bradford wards of Great Horton, Odsal, Queensbury, Tong, Wibsey, and Wyke.

2010–2024: The City of Bradford wards of Great Horton, Queensbury, Royds, Tong, Wibsey, and Wyke.

2024–present: As above, apart from the gain of a small part of the Bowling and Barkerend ward (polling district 5F) from Bradford East to bring the electorate within the permitted range.

== History ==
It was a Liberal-held seat from 1922 to 1924 and 1931–1945. Since the 1945 general election Bradford South has returned Labour Party MPs, although the Conservative Party came very close to gaining the seat in the 1980s.

== Members of Parliament ==
Elland prior to 1918

Election	Member	Party
1918	Vernon Willey	Coalition Conservative
1922	Herbert Harvey Spencer	Liberal
1924	William Hirst	Co-operative
1931	Herbert Holdsworth	Liberal
1945	Meredith Titterington	Labour
1949 by-election	George Craddock	Labour
1970	Tom Torney	Labour
1987	Bob Cryer	Labour
1994 by-election	Gerry Sutcliffe	Labour
2015	Judith Cummins	Labour

== Elections ==
=== Elections in the 2020s ===
General election 2024: Bradford South
Party	Candidate	Votes	%	±%
Labour	Judith Cummins	11,833	35.8	−10.9
Reform	Ian Eglin	7,441	22.5	+15.5
Conservative	Zaf Shah	4,853	14.7	−25.4
Green	Matt Edwards	3,366	10.2	+7.7
Independent	Rehiana Ali	3,345	10.1	N/A
Liberal Democrats	Anthony Smith	954	2.9	−0.8
Workers Party	Harry Boota	513	1.6	N/A
Yorkshire	Jonathan Barras	489	1.5	N/A
English Democrat	Thérèse Hirst	248	0.8	N/A
Majority		4,392	13.3	+6.6
Turnout		33,042	46.5	−11.2
Registered electors		71,002		
Labour hold		Swing	−13.2	

=== Elections in the 2010s ===
2019 notional result
Party	Vote	%
Labour	19,110	46.7
Conservative	16,381	40.1
Brexit Party	2,872	7.0
Liberal Democrats	1,519	3.7
Green	1,007	2.5
Turnout	40,889	57.7
Electorate	70,890	

General election 2019: Bradford South
Party	Candidate	Votes	%	±%
Labour	Judith Cummins	18,390	46.3	−8.2
Conservative	Narinder Sekhon	16,044	40.4	+2.2
Brexit Party	Kulvinder Manik	2,819	7.1	N/A
Liberal Democrats	Alun Griffiths	1,505	3.8	+2.5
Green	Matthew Edwards	983	2.5	+1.6
Majority		2,346	5.9	−10.4
Turnout		39,741	57.6	−3.0
Labour hold		Swing	−5.2	

General election 2017: Bradford South
Party	Candidate	Votes	%	±%
Labour	Judith Cummins	22,364	54.5	+11.1
Conservative	Tanya Graham	15,664	38.2	+11.9
UKIP	Stephen Place	1,758	4.3	−19.8
Liberal Democrats	Stuart Thomas	516	1.3	−1.6
English Democrat	Thérèse Hirst	377	0.9	N/A
Green	Darren Parkinson	370	0.9	−2.4
Majority		6,700	16.3	−0.9
Turnout		41,049	60.6	+1.5
Labour hold		Swing	−0.4	

General election 2015: Bradford South
Party	Candidate	Votes	%	±%
Labour	Judith Cummins	16,328	43.4	+2.1
Conservative	Tanya Graham	9,878	26.3	−2.8
UKIP	Jason Smith	9,057	24.1	+20.6
Green	Andy Robinson	1,243	3.3	N/A
Liberal Democrats	Andrew Tear	1,094	2.9	−15.4
Majority		6,450	17.1	+4.9
Turnout		37,600	59.1	−0.7
Labour hold		Swing	+2.5	

General election 2010: Bradford South
Party	Candidate	Votes	%	±%
Labour	Gerry Sutcliffe	15,682	41.3	−7.0
Conservative	Matthew Palmer	11,060	29.1	+4.8
Liberal Democrats	Alun Griffiths	6,948	18.3	+3.8
BNP	Sharon Sutton	2,651	7.0	−0.8
UKIP	Jamie Illingworth	1,339	3.5	+2.0
Democratic Nationalist	James Lewthwaite	315	0.8	N/A
Majority		4,622	12.2	−12.8
Turnout		37,995	59.8	+6.3
Labour hold		Swing	−5.9	

=== Elections in the 2000s ===
General election 2005: Bradford South
Party	Candidate	Votes	%	±%
Labour	Gerry Sutcliffe	17,954	49.0	−6.8
Conservative	Geraldine Carter	8,787	24.0	−4.3
Liberal Democrats	Mike Doyle	5,334	14.6	+4.0
BNP	James Lewthwaite	2,862	7.8	N/A
Green	Derek Curtis	695	1.9	N/A
UKIP	Jason Smith	552	1.5	−0.7
Veritas	Therese Muchewicz	421	1.2	N/A
Majority		9,167	25.0	−2.5
Turnout		36,605	54.2	+2.9
Labour hold		Swing	−1.2	

General election 2001: Bradford South
Party	Candidate	Votes	%	±%
Labour	Gerry Sutcliffe	19,603	55.8	−0.9
Conservative	Graham Tennyson	9,941	28.3	+0.3
Liberal Democrats	Alexander Wilson-Fletcher	3,717	10.6	−0.7
UKIP	Peter North	783	2.2	N/A
Socialist Labour	Tony Kelly	571	1.6	N/A
Socialist Alliance	Ateeq Siddique	302	0.9	N/A
Defend The Welfare State Against Blairism	George Riseborough	220	0.6	N/A
Majority		9,662	27.5	−1.2
Turnout		35,137	51.3	−14.6
Labour hold		Swing		

=== Elections in the 1990s ===
General election 1997: Bradford South
Party	Candidate	Votes	%	±%
Labour	Gerry Sutcliffe	25,558	56.7	+9.1
Conservative	Ann G. Hawkesworth	12,622	28.0	−10.4
Liberal Democrats	Alexander Wilson-Fletcher	5,093	11.3	−2.4
Referendum	Marilyn Kershaw	1,785	4.0	N/A
Majority		12,936	28.7	+19.5
Turnout		45,058	65.9	−9.7
Labour hold		Swing		

1994 Bradford South by-election
Party	Candidate	Votes	%	±%
Labour	Gerry Sutcliffe	17,014	55.3	+7.7
Liberal Democrats	Helen Wright	7,350	23.9	+10.2
Conservative	Ronnie Farley	5,475	17.8	−20.6
Monster Raving Loony	David Sutch	727	2.4	N/A
Natural Law	Keith Laycock	197	0.6	N/A
Majority		9,664	31.4	+22.2
Turnout		30,763	44.1	−31.5
Labour hold		Swing		

General election 1992: Bradford South
Party	Candidate	Votes	%	±%
Labour	Bob Cryer	25,185	47.6	+6.2
Conservative	Andrew S. Popat	20,283	38.4	−2.4
Liberal Democrats	Brian J. Boulton	7,243	13.7	−4.1
Islamic Party	Mohammad Naseem	156	0.3	N/A
Majority		4,902	9.2	+8.6
Turnout		52,867	75.6	+2.0
Labour hold		Swing		

=== Elections in the 1980s ===
General election 1987: Bradford South
Party	Candidate	Votes	%	±%
Labour	Bob Cryer	21,230	41.4	+3.9
Conservative	Graham Hall	20,921	40.8	+3.5
SDP	Trevor Lindley	9,109	17.8	−6.8
Majority		309	0.6	+0.4
Turnout		51,260	73.7	+2.7
Labour hold		Swing	+0.2	

General election 1983: Bradford South
Party	Candidate	Votes	%	±%
Labour	Tom Torney	18,542	37.5	
Conservative	Graham Hall	18,432	37.3	
SDP	David Pearl	12,143	24.6	N/A
Ecology	Robert Adset	308	0.6	N/A
Majority		110	0.2	
Turnout		49,425	71.0	
Labour hold		Swing		

=== Elections in the 1970s ===
General election 1979: Bradford South
Party	Candidate	Votes	%	±%
Labour	Tom Torney	26,323	47.11	
Conservative	JK Hirst	22,005	39.38	
Liberal	R Taylor	7,127	12.75	
National Front	G Wright	422	0.76	N/A
Majority		4,318	7.73	
Turnout		55,877	73.18	
Labour hold		Swing		

General election October 1974: Bradford South
Party	Candidate	Votes	%	±%
Labour	Tom Torney	25,219	48.05	
Conservative	GC Littlewood	16,964	32.32	
Liberal	CJ Cawood	10,306	19.63	
Majority		8,255	15.73	
Turnout		52,489	71.64	
Labour hold		Swing		

General election February 1974: Bradford South
Party	Candidate	Votes	%	±%
Labour	Tom Torney	25,875	44.76	
Conservative	PG Dwyer	18,222	31.52	
Liberal	Margaretta Holmstedt	12,961	22.42	
Independent Powellite	R Pearson	749	1.30	N/A
Majority		7,653	13.24	
Turnout		57,807	79.68	
Labour hold		Swing		

General election 1970: Bradford South
Party	Candidate	Votes	%	±%
Labour	Tom Torney	20,985	45.93	
Conservative	John Derek Whittaker Bottomley	19,009	41.61	
Liberal	George Dunkerley	5,694	12.46	
Majority		1,976	4.32	
Turnout		45,688	72.01	
Labour hold		Swing	-6.3	

=== Elections in the 1960s ===
General election 1966: Bradford South
Party	Candidate	Votes	%	±%
Labour	George Craddock	22,932	52.53	
Conservative	John Derek Whittaker Bottomley	15,435	35.35	
Liberal	George Dunkerley	5,291	12.12	
Majority		7,497	17.18	
Turnout		43,658	75.99	
Labour hold		Swing	+4.25	

General election 1964: Bradford South
Party	Candidate	Votes	%	±%
Labour	George Craddock	21,004	46.28	
National Liberal	John Derek Whittaker Bottomley	17,097	37.67	
Liberal	Allen Clegg	7,286	16.05	
Majority		3,907	8.61	
Turnout		45,387	78.57	
Labour hold		Swing		

=== Elections in the 1950s ===
General election 1959: Bradford South
Party	Candidate	Votes	%	±%
Labour	George Craddock	21,172	45.85	
National Liberal	Reginald Winston Jones	18,158	39.32	
Liberal	Hugh Womersley	6,850	14.83	
Majority		3,014	6.53	
Turnout		46,180	80.99	
Labour hold		Swing		

General election 1955: Bradford South
Party	Candidate	Votes	%	±%
Labour	George Craddock	20,478	47.32	
National Liberal	Reginald Winston Jones	16,768	38.75	
Liberal	Arthur T Ellis	6,029	13.93	
Majority		3,710	8.57	
Turnout		43,275	80.36	
Labour hold		Swing		

General election 1951: Bradford South
Party	Candidate	Votes	%	±%
Labour	George Craddock	21,364	47.16	
National Liberal	Geoffrey Francis Greenbank	17,863	39.43	
Liberal	Edward Rushworth	6,072	13.40	
Majority		3,501	7.73	
Turnout		45,299	86.21	
Labour hold		Swing		

General election 1950: Bradford South
Party	Candidate	Votes	%	±%
Labour	George Craddock	21,344	47.50	
National Liberal	John Lightfoot Windle	15,998	35.60	
Liberal	Edward Rushworth	7,594	16.90	
Majority		5,346	11.90	
Turnout		44,936	86.19	
Labour hold		Swing		

=== Elections in the 1940s ===
1949 Bradford South by-election
Party	Candidate	Votes	%	±%
Labour	George Craddock	23,335	51.3	−1.2
National Liberal	John Lightfoot Windle	19,313	42.4	+9.3
Independent Liberal	Colin James Canning	2,882	6.3	N/A
Majority		4,022	8.9	−10.5
Turnout		45,530	74.4	−2.5
Labour hold		Swing	−5.3	

General election 1945: Bradford South
Party	Candidate	Votes	%	±%
Labour Co-op	Meredith Titterington	24,394	52.5	+11.0
National Liberal	Herbert Walker Peel	15,392	33.1	N/A
Liberal	Charles Ewart Hindley	6,707	14.4	−44.1
Majority		9,002	19.4	N/A
Turnout		46,493	76.9	+6.6
Labour Co-op gain from Liberal		Swing		

General Election 1939–40:

Another General Election was required to take place before the end of 1940. The political parties had been making preparations for an election to take place from 1939 and by the end of this year, the following candidates had been selected;

- Liberal National: Herbert Holdsworth
- Labour: Meredith Titterington
- Liberal: Charles Ewart Hindley

=== Elections in the 1930s ===
General election 1935: Bradford South
Party	Candidate	Votes	%	±%
Liberal	Herbert Holdsworth	24,081	58.5	−7.9
Labour Co-op	William Hirst	17,121	41.5	+7.9
Majority		6,960	17.0	−15.8
Turnout		41,202	70.3	−12.3
Liberal hold		Swing		

General election 1931: Bradford South
Party	Candidate	Votes	%	±%
Liberal	Herbert Holdsworth	31,531	66.4	+40.6
Labour Co-op	William Hirst	15,994	33.6	−15.3
Majority		15,537	32.8	N/A
Turnout		47,525	82.61	−0.4
Liberal gain from Labour Co-op		Swing		

=== Elections in the 1920s ===
General election 1929: Bradford South
Party	Candidate	Votes	%	±%
Labour Co-op	William Hirst	23,251	48.9	+9.9
Liberal	Frederick Ogden	12,279	25.8	−2.8
Unionist	Geoffrey William Ferrand	12,050	25.3	−7.1
Majority		10,972	23.1	+16.5
Turnout		47,580	83.0	+0.8
Labour Co-op hold		Swing	+6.3	

General election 1924: Bradford South
Party	Candidate	Votes	%	±%
Labour Co-op	William Hirst	13,919	39.0	+4.1
Unionist	George Mitcheson	11,586	32.4	+4.3
Liberal	Herbert Harvey Spencer	10,237	28.6	−8.4
Majority		2,333	6.6	N/A
Turnout		35,742	82.2	+5.3
Labour Co-op gain from Liberal		Swing		

General election 1923: Bradford South
Party	Candidate	Votes	%	±%
Liberal	Herbert Harvey Spencer	12,218	37.0	−1.0
Labour Co-op	William Hirst	11,543	34.9	−0.4
Unionist	George Mitcheson	9,270	28.1	+1.4
Majority		675	2.1	−0.6
Turnout		33,031	76.9	−5.3
Liberal hold		Swing	−0.3	

General election 1922: Bradford South
Party	Candidate	Votes	%	±%
Liberal	Herbert Harvey Spencer	13,259	38.0	+13.4
Labour Co-op	William Hirst	12,353	35.3	+4.4
Unionist	Vernon Willey	9,334	26.7	−17.8
Majority		906	2.7	N/A
Turnout		34,946	82.2	+17.4
Liberal gain from Unionist		Swing		

=== Elections in the 1910s ===
General election 1918: Bradford South
Party		Candidate	Votes	%	±%
C	Unionist	Vernon Willey	11,949	44.5	
	Co-operative Party	William Hirst	8,291	30.9	
	Liberal	George Muff	6,613	24.6	
Majority			3,658	13.6	
Turnout			26,853	64.8	
	Unionist win (new seat)				
C indicates candidate endorsed by the coalition government.

== See also ==
- 1994 Bradford South by-election
- 1949 Bradford South by-election
- Parliamentary constituencies in West Yorkshire
- List of parliamentary constituencies in the Yorkshire and the Humber (region)
