= 1994 Bradford South by-election =

UK Parliamentary by-election

- 9 June 1994

Constituency of Bradford South
- Turnout: 44.1% (▼31.5%)
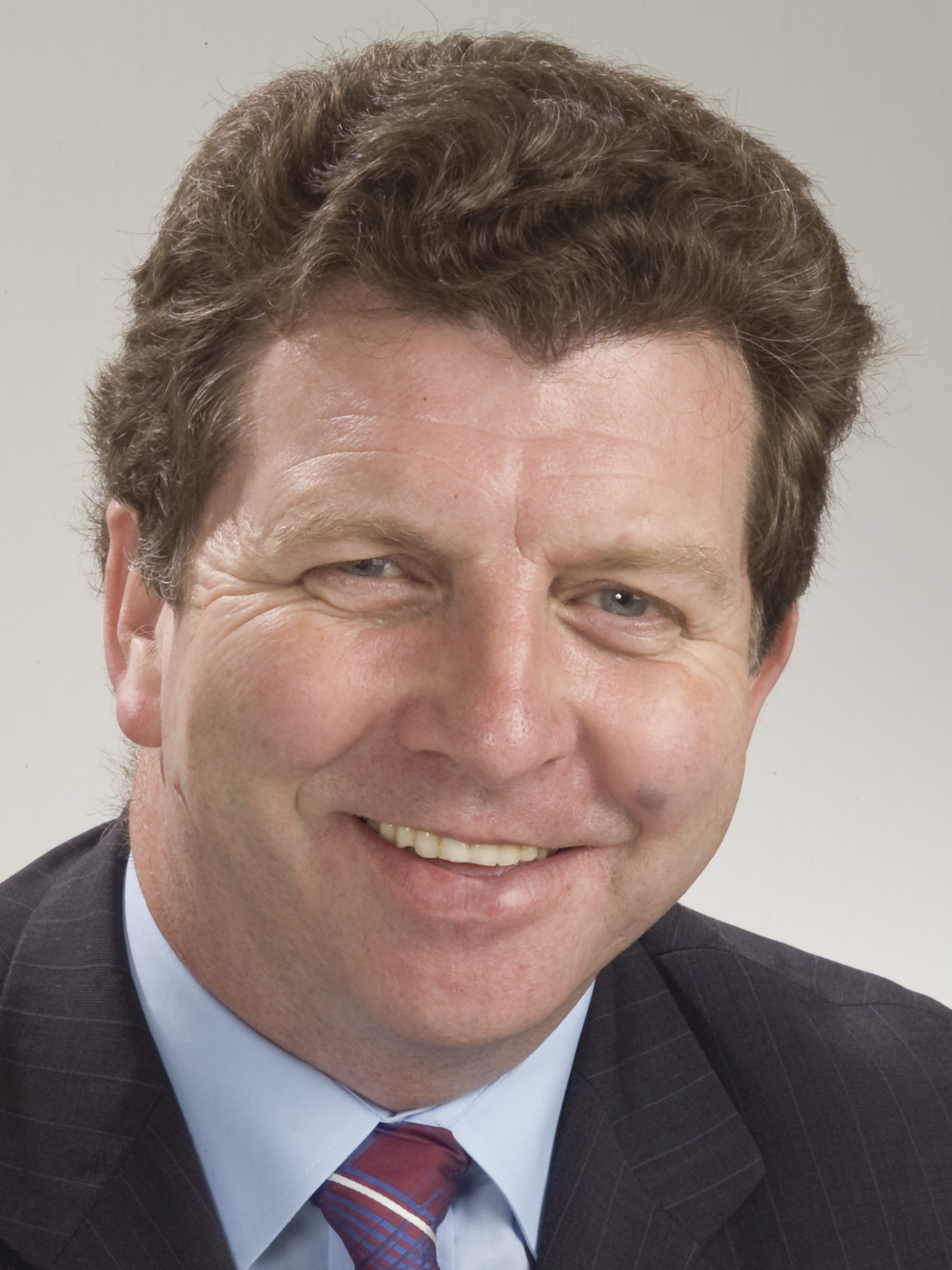
	First party	Second party	Third party
		LD	Con
Candidate	Gerry Sutcliffe	Helen Wright	Ronnie Farley
Party	Labour	Liberal Democrats	Conservative
Popular vote	17,014	7,350	5,475
Percentage	55.3%	23.9%	17.8%
Swing	▲7.7%	▲10.2%	▼20.6%
MP before election
Bob Cryer
Labour
Subsequent MP
Gerry Sutcliffe
Labour

The 1994 Bradford South by-election was a by-election held in England on 9 June 1994 for the UK House of Commons constituency of Bradford South in West Yorkshire.

The seat had become vacant on the death in a car accident on 12 April of the Labour Member of Parliament (MP) Bob Cryer, who had represented the constituency since the 1987 general election.

The Labour candidate, Gerry Sutcliffe, held the seat for his party with a much increased majority.

== Result ==
Bradford South by-election, 1994
Party	Candidate	Votes	%	±%
Labour	Gerry Sutcliffe	17,014	55.3	+7.7
Liberal Democrats	Helen Wright	7,350	23.9	+10.2
Conservative	Ronnie Farley	5,475	17.8	−20.6
Monster Raving Loony	David Sutch	727	2.4	New
Natural Law	Keith Laycock	197	0.6	New
Majority		9,664	31.4	+22.2
Turnout		30,763	44.1	−31.5
Labour hold		Swing		

== Previous result ==
General election 1992: Bradford South
Party	Candidate	Votes	%	±%
Labour	Bob Cryer	25,185	47.6	+6.2
Conservative	Andrew S. Popat	20,283	38.4	−2.4
Liberal Democrats	Brian J. Boulton	7,243	13.7	−4.1
Islamic Party	Mohammad Naseem	156	0.3	New
Majority		4,902	9.2	+8.6
Turnout		52,867	75.6	+2.0
Labour hold		Swing		

== See also ==
- Bradford South (UK Parliament constituency)
- 1949 Bradford South by-election
- Lists of United Kingdom by-elections
