= Barrand =

Barrand is a French surname. People with the name include:

- Sarah Barrand (born 1985), an English actress
- Tony Barrand (1945–2022, England), an academic and musician
- Arthur Rhys Barrand (1861–1941) was a British Liberal Party politician, Member of Parliament 1918–1922
