= Roger Barton (politician) =

British engineer and politician

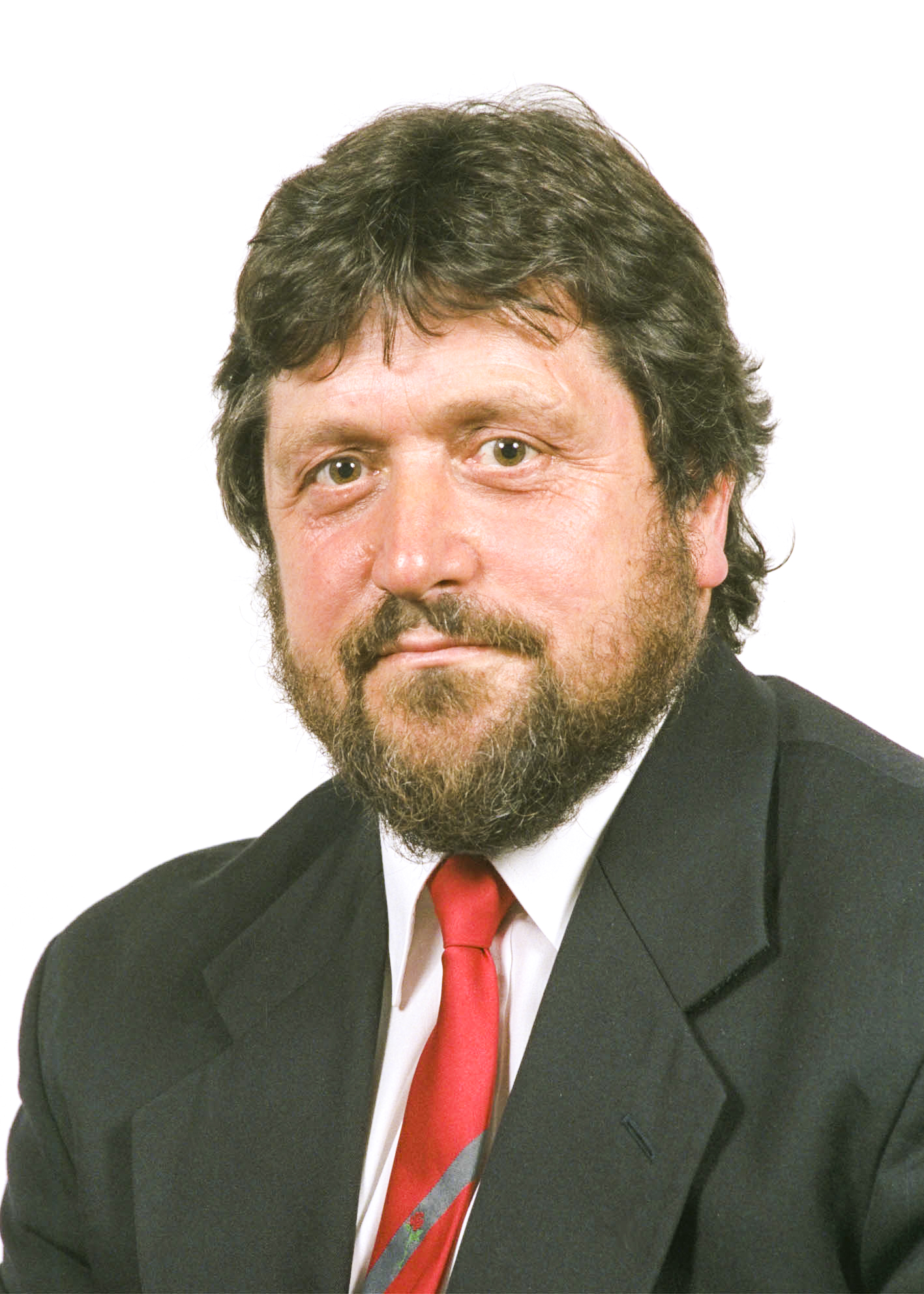
- Official portrait, 1994

Member of the European Parliament for Sheffield
- In office 15 June 1989 – 10 June 1999
- Preceded by: Bob Cryer
- Succeeded by: Constituency dissolved

Personal details
- Born: 6 January 1945 (age 81) Sheffield, England
- Party: Labour

Roger Barton (born 6 January 1945) is a British engineer and politician who served for ten years as a Member of the European Parliament (MEP). He was a leading member of the Labour Party in Sheffield and served on the City Council. After losing his seat in the European Parliament, he set up an organisation that offers llama trekking to young people in the city.

== Engineering ==
Barton was born in Sheffield and went to Burngreave Secondary Modern School. He went into work as an apprenticed engineering fitter in 1960. In 1965 he obtained an Engineering Technician's Certificate from Granville College. Barton became active in the Labour Party and in 1971 was elected to Sheffield City Council.

== Party chairman ==
In 1974 Barton was chairman of Sheffield Brightside Constituency Labour Party when the party deselected its Member of Parliament, Edward Griffiths, by 40 votes to 10. When Griffiths claimed he was the victim of a "left-wing coup", Barton gave a list of ten reasons why the constituency association were unhappy with him, including reneging on a promise to move to the constituency.

== Local party secretary ==
In 1981 Barton left his job in engineering to be full-time Secretary of Sheffield Trades and Labour Council and Labour Party. During the 1983 leadership election of the Labour Party, Barton outlined the reason why the Sheffield Labour Party had sold cassettes of the four leadership candidates being cross-examined by Sheffield party members. He insisted that "we really do object to the media editing internal debates", and declared that he did not want to conduct debates through the newspapers because it would keep down the party's standing with the public.

== European Parliament ==
Barton offered himself for selection for the Labour nomination for the Sheffield constituency in the 1984 European Parliament election, as a left-wing opponent of British membership of the European Communities; however he lost out to Bob Cryer, who had lost his Parliamentary seat the previous year. When Cryer was returned to the House of Commons in the 1987 general election he stood down from the European Parliament and Barton was selected for the 1989 election.

== Political views ==
After winning the seat easily, Barton became identified with the left-wing in the European Parliament's Labour Group. He led the signatories of a letter calling for support for a Campaign for Nuclear Disarmament rally, and signed an advertisement opposing changes to Clause IV when Tony Blair proposed to drop it. Barton opposed a proposal from German Commissioner Martin Bangemann to restrict the sale of superbikes, and persuaded the European Parliament to vote against it.

== Defeat ==
In the 1999 election, Barton was placed in fourth place on the Labour Party's list for Yorkshire and the Humber. As the Labour Party won only three seats, Barton was defeated. For a time he was a Director of Insight Dynamics, an information technology company.

== Llama trekking ==
Barton set up the Sheffield and Peak District Llama Trekking project in 2006, aiming to encourage young people from inner-city Sheffield to venture out into the countryside. The project is based in the Mayfield Valley, but Barton brought his llamas to local festivals; he commented that many local children thought they were sheep. Barton has noted that although llamas are famous for spitting as a sign of aggression, there was only one occasion when he had intervened in a fight between them that he had been spat at.

Trade union offices
Preceded by	Secretary of the Sheffield Trades and Labour Council; 1981–1989	Succeeded by Bill Ronksley
European Parliament
Preceded by Bob Cryer	Member of the European Parliament for Sheffield; 1989–1999	Constituency abolished
