= Elmet (constituency) =

UK Parliament constituency (1983–2010)

Coordinates: 53.818°N 1.404°W

- Former county constituency for the House of Commons
- Boundary of Elmet in West Yorkshire for the 2005 general election

- Location of West Yorkshire within England
- County: West Yorkshire
- Major settlements: Garforth, Wetherby

1983–2010
- Seats: One
- Created from: Barkston Ash, Leeds East and Normanton
- Replaced by: Elmet and Rothwell

Elmet was a county constituency in West Yorkshire represented in the House of Commons of the Parliament of the United Kingdom. It elected one Member of Parliament (MP) by the first past the post system of election.

From 1997 the MP was Colin Burgon of Labour, who did not stand in the 2010 general election.

== Boundaries ==
The City of Leeds wards of Barwick and Kippax, Garforth and Swillington, Wetherby, and Whinmoor.

The constituency was created in 1983 to cover the far eastern wards of Leeds and neighbouring areas, notably Wetherby, Barwick-in-Elmet, Kippax, Garforth and Swillington. It also includes the Whinmoor area of east Leeds. Initially the Boundary Commission for England proposed calling the constituency Leeds East, with the existing Leeds East constituency being renamed Leeds East Central. This was opposed during local enquiries where the seat was instead named for the ancient kingdom of Elmet although it covers a significantly smaller area. Wetherby and Garforth were the largest settlements in the constituency.

=== Boundary review ===
Following their review of parliamentary representations in West Yorkshire, the Boundary Commission for England created a new seat, Elmet and Rothwell, reducing the number of seats in the region by one.

== History ==
The constituency was created in 1983 from parts of the seats of Barkston Ash, Leeds East, and Normanton. Elmet was historically always a marginal seat due to the demographic makeup of the region, in contrast to Barkston Ash which was traditionally Tory.

After the 1983 general election the metropolitan district of the City of Leeds was represented by the constituencies of Elmet, Leeds Central, Leeds East, Leeds North East, Leeds North West, Leeds West, Morley and Leeds South and Pudsey.

== Members of Parliament ==
Election	Member	Party
1983	Spencer Batiste	Conservative
1997	Colin Burgon	Labour
2010	constituency abolished: see Elmet and Rothwell	

== Elections ==
=== Elections in the 1980s ===
General election 1983: Elmet
Party	Candidate	Votes	%	±%
Conservative	Spencer Batiste	23,909	47.3	
Labour	Roy Wilson	16,053	31.7	
Liberal	Gillian Paterson	10,589	21.0	
Majority		7,856	15.6	
Turnout		50,551	75.4	
Conservative win (new seat)				

General election 1987: Elmet
Party	Candidate	Votes	%	±%
Conservative	Spencer Batiste	25,658	46.9	−0.4
Labour	Colin Burgon	20,302	37.1	+5.4
SDP	John Macarthur	8,755	16.0	−5.0
Majority		5,356	9.8	−5.8
Turnout		54,715	79.3	+3.9
Conservative hold		Swing		

=== Elections in the 1990s ===
General election 1992: Elmet
Party	Candidate	Votes	%	±%
Conservative	Spencer Batiste	27,677	47.5	+0.6
Labour	Colin Burgon	24,416	41.9	+4.8
Liberal Democrats	Ann Beck	6,144	10.5	−5.5
Majority		3,261	5.6	−4.2
Turnout		58,237	82.4	+3.1
Conservative hold		Swing	−2.1	

General election 1997: Elmet
Party	Candidate	Votes	%	±%
Labour	Colin Burgon	28,348	52.4	+10.5
Conservative	Spencer Batiste	19,569	36.2	−11.3
Liberal Democrats	Brian Jennings	4,691	8.7	−1.8
Referendum	Christopher Zawadski	1,487	2.7	New
Majority		8,779	16.2	N/A
Turnout		54,185	76.8	−5.6
Labour gain from Conservative		Swing	+10.9	

=== Elections in the 2000s ===
General election 2001: Elmet
Party	Candidate	Votes	%	±%
Labour	Colin Burgon	22,038	48.0	−4.4
Conservative	Andrew Millard	17,867	38.9	+2.7
Liberal Democrats	Madeleine Kirk	5,001	10.9	+2.2
UKIP	Andrew Spence	1,031	2.2	New
Majority		4,171	9.1	−7.1
Turnout		45,937	65.6	−11.2
Labour hold		Swing		

General election 2005: Elmet
Party	Candidate	Votes	%	±%
Labour	Colin Burgon	22,260	47.2	−0.8
Conservative	Andrew Millard	17,732	37.6	−1.3
Liberal Democrats	Madeleine Kirk	5,923	12.6	+1.7
BNP	Tracy Andrews	1,231	2.6	New
Majority		4,528	9.6	+0.5
Turnout		47,146	68.8	+3.2
Labour hold		Swing		

== See also ==
- List of parliamentary constituencies in West Yorkshire
