= Sheffield (European Parliament constituency) =

Former European Parliament constituency

- European Parliament constituency
- Boundary within the East Midlands (1979-1984)
- Member state: United Kingdom
- Created: 1979
- Dissolved: 1999
- MEPs: 1

Sheffield was a European Parliament constituency covering the City of Sheffield and parts of Derbyshire in England.

Prior to its uniform adoption of proportional representation in 1999, the United Kingdom used first-past-the-post for the European elections in England, Scotland and Wales. The European Parliament constituencies used under that system were smaller than the later regional constituencies and only had one Member of the European Parliament each.

When the constituency was created in 1979, it consisted of the Westminster Parliament constituencies of Chesterfield, Derbyshire North East, Sheffield Attercliffe, Sheffield Brightside, Sheffield Hallam, Sheffield Heeley, Sheffield Hillsborough and Sheffield Park. In 1984, Park was replaced by Sheffield Central, and the boundaries of the other constituencies changed. Larger changes occurred in 1994, when the Derbyshire constituencies were removed to Nottinghamshire North and Chesterfield and replaced by Barnsley West and Penistone.

Boundary within the East Midlands (1984-1994)

Boundary within Yorkshire and the Humber (1994-1999)

== Members of the European Parliament ==
Elected	Name	Party
1979	Richard Caborn	Labour
1984	Bob Cryer	Labour
1989	Roger Barton	Labour
1999	Constituency abolished: see Yorkshire and the Humber	

== Results ==
European Parliament election, 1979: Sheffield
Party	Candidate	Votes	%	±%
Labour	Richard Caborn	77,219	50.7	
Conservative	S. L. Batiste	64,157	42.1	
Liberal	K. A. Salt	10,951	7.2	
Majority		13,062	8.6	
Turnout		152,327	29.4	
Labour win (new seat)				

European Parliament election, 1984: Sheffield
Party	Candidate	Votes	%	±%
Labour	Bob Cryer	93,530	56.8	+6.1
Conservative	David R. Grayson	47,247	28.7	–13.4
Liberal	G. M. (Margareta) Holmstedt	23,935	14.5	+7.3
Majority		46,283	28.1	+19.5
Turnout		164,712	29.5	+0.1
Labour hold		Swing		

European Parliament election, 1989: Sheffield
Party	Candidate	Votes	%	±%
Labour	Roger Barton	109,677	58.2	+1.4
Conservative	T. S. R. (Simon) Mort	40,401	21.4	–7.3
Green	Peter L. Scott	26,844	14.2	New
SLD	A. H. (Tony) Rogers	10,910	5.8	–8.7
International Communist	D. E. Hyland	657	0.4	New
Majority		69,276	36.8	+8.7
Turnout		188,489	33.7	+4.2
Labour hold		Swing		

European Parliament election, 1994: Sheffield
Party	Candidate	Votes	%	±%
Labour	Roger Barton	76,937	58.5	+0.3
Liberal Democrats	Sylvia Agninotti	26,109	19.9	+14.1
Conservative	Kay Twitchen	22,374	17.0	–4.4
Green	Barry A. New	4,742	3.6	–10.6
International Communist	Michael England	834	0.6	+0.2
Natural Law	Richard E. Hurford	577	0.4	New
Majority		50,828	38.6	+1.8
Turnout		131,573	27.5	–6.2
Labour hold		Swing		
