= Francis Willey, 1st Baron Barnby =

English wool merchant

The Right Honourable The Lord Barnby JP
- Lord Barnby, The Glasgow Herald, 2 January 1922
- Born: Francis Willey; 27 February 1841; Bradford, West Riding of Yorkshire, England
- Died: 16 February 1929 (aged 87)
- Occupation: Wool merchant

Francis Willey, 1st Baron Barnby, JP (27 February 1841 – 16 February 1929) was an English wool merchant.

Willey was born in Bradford and joined his father's wool business, which later became Francis Willey & Co Ltd and had agencies all over the Dominions and the United States. Willey was also a great horseman, huntsman and racehorse owner. He was created Baron Barnby in the 1922 New Year Honours.

Willey was commissioned sub-lieutenant in the 2nd West Riding of Yorkshire Artillery Volunteers in December 1874. He was promoted major in May 1888 and resigned in April 1891.

His seat was Blyth Hall, Nottinghamshire. He was appointed High Sheriff of Nottinghamshire for 1908. He was succeeded in the barony by his only son, Vernon.

He bought Castle Menzies near Aberfeldy and 11,600 acres of estate in 1918 for £69,000 equivalent to £4,245,600 in 2023). On his death, his widow put the estate up for sale in April 1930.

Coat of arms of Francis Willey, 1st Baron Barnby
Crest In front of a reindeer’s head erased Proper two crosses patée Gules. Escutcheon Per pale Or and Gules three chevronels counterchanged over all a pale Ermine charged with three martlets Sable. Supporters On either side a reindeer Proper charged on the shoulder with a rose Gules. Motto Propositi Tenax

== Footnotes ==
Peerage of the United Kingdom
New creation	Baron Barnby; 1922–1929	Succeeded by Vernon Willey
