= Baron Barnby =

Extinct barony in the Peerage of the United Kingdom

Baron Barnby, of Blyth in the County of Nottingham, was a title in the Peerage of the United Kingdom. It was created on 26 January 1922 for Francis Willey, head of Francis Willey & Co Ltd, wool merchants. The title became extinct on the death of his son, the second Baron, on 30 April 1982.

== Barons Barnby (1922) ==
- Francis Willey, 1st Baron Barnby (1841–1929)
- Francis Vernon Willey, 2nd Baron Barnby (1884–1982)

== Arms ==
Coat of arms of the Barons Barnby
Crest In front of a reindeer’s head erased Proper two crosses patée Gules. Escutcheon Per pale Or and Gules three chevronels counterchanged over all a pale Ermine charged with three martlets Sable. Supporters On either side a reindeer Proper charged on the shoulder with a rose Gules. Motto Propositi Tenax
