= John Christopher Smuts =

Lt-Col. John Christopher Smuts OBE BCL (3 October 1910– 14 October 1979), known as Christopher Smuts was a South African born British barrister and Liberal Party politician.

== Background ==
He was born in Pretoria, South Africa, the eldest son of Johannes Smuts of Wynberg, Cape Town. He was educated at Diocesan College, Rondebosch and University College, Oxford. In 1946 he married Pierina Santi of Trieste, Italy. He was made an Officer of the Order of the British Empire.

== Professional career ==
He qualified as a barrister and was Called to the bar by the Inner Temple. He practised as a barrister in London from 1933 to 1939. During the war Smuts served in the Middlesex Yeomanry, reaching the rank of lieutenant-colonel. He ended the war as G. I. (Operations) Eighth Army H.Q. He was awarded the American Bronze Star. In 1946 he became Area Commissioner (i.e. Military Governor) of Trieste and had to deal with public demonstrations and other problems arising from Iron Curtain issues on the Italy/Yugoslavia border. In 1948 he became British Council in London and Greece. In 1951 he became Secretary of the National Film Finance Corporation, continuing in that job through 1954.

== Political career ==
He first became active in student politics whilst at Oxford University. In 1932 he was President of the Oxford Union He became active in the Liberal Party, taking a particular interest in foreign affairs. In 1935 he was a member of the Liberal Party Council. At their meeting in May 1935 he seconded the motion on 'Peace and Security', calling for greater collective security through the League of Nations, which shaped the Liberal party's policy for the 1935 General Election in November. He was Liberal candidate for the Pudsey and Otley division of Yorkshire at the 1935 General Election. It was not the most promising of seat; the Liberals had not run a candidate at the last election in 1931. In 1929, the last time they ran a candidate, they came third. A Liberal had not finished second since 1923. However, in a year that was not particularly good for the Liberals Smuts took second place from the Labour party;

General Election 14 November 1935: Pudsey and Otley Electorate 56,265
Party	Candidate	Votes	%	±%
Conservative	Charles Granville Gibson	22,107	51.7	−24.3
Liberal	John Christopher Smuts	10,682	25.0	n/a
Labour	Lucy Annie Cox	9,997	23.3	−0.7
Majority		11,425	26.7	−25.3
Turnout		42,766	76.0	−3.9
Conservative hold		Swing	n/a	

In 1936 Smuts activity in the Liberal party took the form of membership of the 8.30 Club, a young Liberal group that monthly debated international issues from its founding in 1936 to 1939. Smuts also maintained a profile in the Pudsey constituency and by May 1938 had been re-selected as prospective parliamentary candidate. He was publicly critical of Prime Minister Neville Chamberlain's appeasement policy to Nazi Germany along with Liberal leader Sir Archibald Sinclair. In July 1939 they called for a more broadly based government to be formed which included Winston Churchill. The Times, which supported Chamberlain and opposed the inclusion of Churchill, tried to undermine Sinclair and attacked Smuts and others who defended Sinclair's position. He was actively campaigning in the Pudsey constituency through the summer of 1939 in anticipation of a general election being called. However, he was denied the opportunity of running again due to the outbreak of war. By the time the war ended in 1945 he had been replaced as Liberal candidate. He did not stand for parliament again.
