= Spencer Batiste =

British judge and politician

Spencer Batiste (born 5 June 1945) is a British retired judge and Member of Parliament. Batiste was educated at Carmel College (1955–1963), the Sorbonne, Paris (1963–1964), Queens' College, Cambridge (1964–1967) and the College of Law (1967–1968). He was articled at Herbert Oppenheimer, Nathan & Vandyk in the City of London (1968–1970) and became a practicing solicitor in 1970 with Branson Bramley of Sheffield until 1986, and then a non-executive board member of DLA (now DLA Piper) until 1995. He was also the law clerk and a guardian of the Sheffield Assay Office and a member of the British Hallmarking Council and of Sheffield University Council.

In the 1979 European Parliamentary elections, Batiste unsuccessfully contested the Sheffield European Parliament constituency. However, in 1983 he became the Conservative MP for Elmet in the United Kingdom general election, a seat which he held until his defeat in the Labour landslide in the 1997 general election. He served as Parliamentary Private Secretary to Sir Geoffrey Pattie at the Department of Trade & Industry, Lord Trefgarne at the Ministry of Defence, and, latterly, for European Commissioner and former Home Secretary Sir Leon Brittan. He was also a member of the Science & Technology and the Information Select Committees and was vice-chairman of the All Party Parliamentary Space Committee,

In 1997, he was appointed as an immigration adjudicator for the Immigration Appellate Authority, and later as a chairman of the Immigration Appeal Tribunal, which became the Asylum and Immigration Tribunal. Later Batiste became a judge of the Upper Tribunal (Immigration & Asylum Chamber) until his retirement in 2012.

He is married with one son and one daughter

== Sources ==
- The Times Guide to the House of Commons, 1992

Parliament of the United Kingdom
| New constituency | Member of Parliament for Elmet; 1983 – 1997 | Succeeded by Colin Burgon |
