= Meredith Titterington =

British politician (1886–1949)

Meredith Farrer Titterington (1886 – 28 October 1949) was a British Labour and Co-operative Party politician. He was elected as Member of Parliament (MP) for Bradford South at the 1945 general election, but died in office in 1949, aged 63.

Aged eleven he started work in a dyeworks but went to night school and, in 1909, won a scholarship to Ruskin College, Oxford. Upon completing his studies he worked for the trade union the "Amalgamated Society of Stuff and Woollen Warehousemen" and in 1915 became their General Secretary. During the war period 1914–18 he was on the Wool Council. In 1919, he served as acting secretary of the National Association of Unions in the Textile Trade, and from 1930 until 1936, he was the organisation's president.

In 1919 he was elected to Bradford City Council, becoming an alderman in 1929 and Lord Mayor in 1939.

Parliament of the United Kingdom
Preceded by Herbert Holdsworth	Member of Parliament for Bradford South; 1945–1949	Succeeded by George Craddock
