= Herbert Holdsworth =

Member of Parliament for Bradford South
- In office 1931–1945
- Preceded by: William Hirst
- Succeeded by: Meredith Titterington

Personal details
- Born: 1890 Liversedge, West Yorkshire
- Died: 8 July 1949 (aged 58–59)
- Party: Liberal

Sir Herbert Holdsworth (1890 - 8 July 1949) was a British Liberal Party politician and businessman.

== Early life and business ==
Holdsworth was born in Liversedge in Yorkshire. He was educated at Batley Grammar School. In June 1914 he married Beatrice Lee of Bradford and they had one daughter. In business, Holdsworth was a director of Holdsworth Bros. (Waste Material Dealers), a director the Provincial Building Society and of Jackson's Ltd. West Riding Realty Company.

== Liberal candidate ==
Holdsworth first tried to enter Parliament in 1929 unsuccessfully contesting the Rothwell division of Yorkshire. He was however elected to represent Bradford South as a Liberal at the 1931 general election, holding the seat until 1945. At the 1935 general election Holdsworth secured a straight fight against Labour in Bradford South, which Roy Douglas, a historian of the Liberal Party, has suggested was a strong indication that some kind of collusive arrangement with the Conservatives had been entered into.

== Liberal National ==
Douglas's suspicion is strengthened by Holdsworth's decision in 1938 to join the Liberal Nationals the political group led by Sir John Simon. In his letter of resignation to the leader of the official Liberals, Sir Archibald Sinclair he gave as his principal reason his wish to continue supporting the foreign policy of Prime Minister Neville Chamberlain and his efforts to bring peace by direct negotiation and personal contact with the European dictators. Holdsworth had been one of four official Liberals who had supported Chamberlain over the Munich Conference and had for some time been at variance with official Liberal foreign policy. By 1939 the Bradford South Liberal Association, while thanking him for his work as their Member of Parliament (MP), voted not to re-adopt him as their candidate for the pending election, selecting Charles Ewart Hindley as prospective parliamentary candidate in his place. He became Chief Whip of the Liberal Nationals in 1940 but resigned in 1942 for reasons of ill-health. He served an Assistant Government Whip over the same period. In 1943, he was appointed to act as adviser to the Ministry of Supply on the general waste reclamation industry and in 1944 he was appointed to a Select committee set up to scrutinise delegated legislation. Holdsworth decided not to fight Bradford South when the 1945 general election came, possibly on grounds of ill-health.

Holdsworth also served as a Justice of the Peace in Bradford and was knighted for political and public services in the 1944 New Year's Honours List.

== See also ==
- List of Liberal Party (UK) MPs
- List of National Liberal Party (UK) MPs

Parliament of the United Kingdom
Preceded by William Hirst	Member of Parliament for Bradford South; 1931 – 1945	Succeeded by Meredith Titterington
