= Judith Cummins =

British politician (born 1967)

Judith Cummins MP
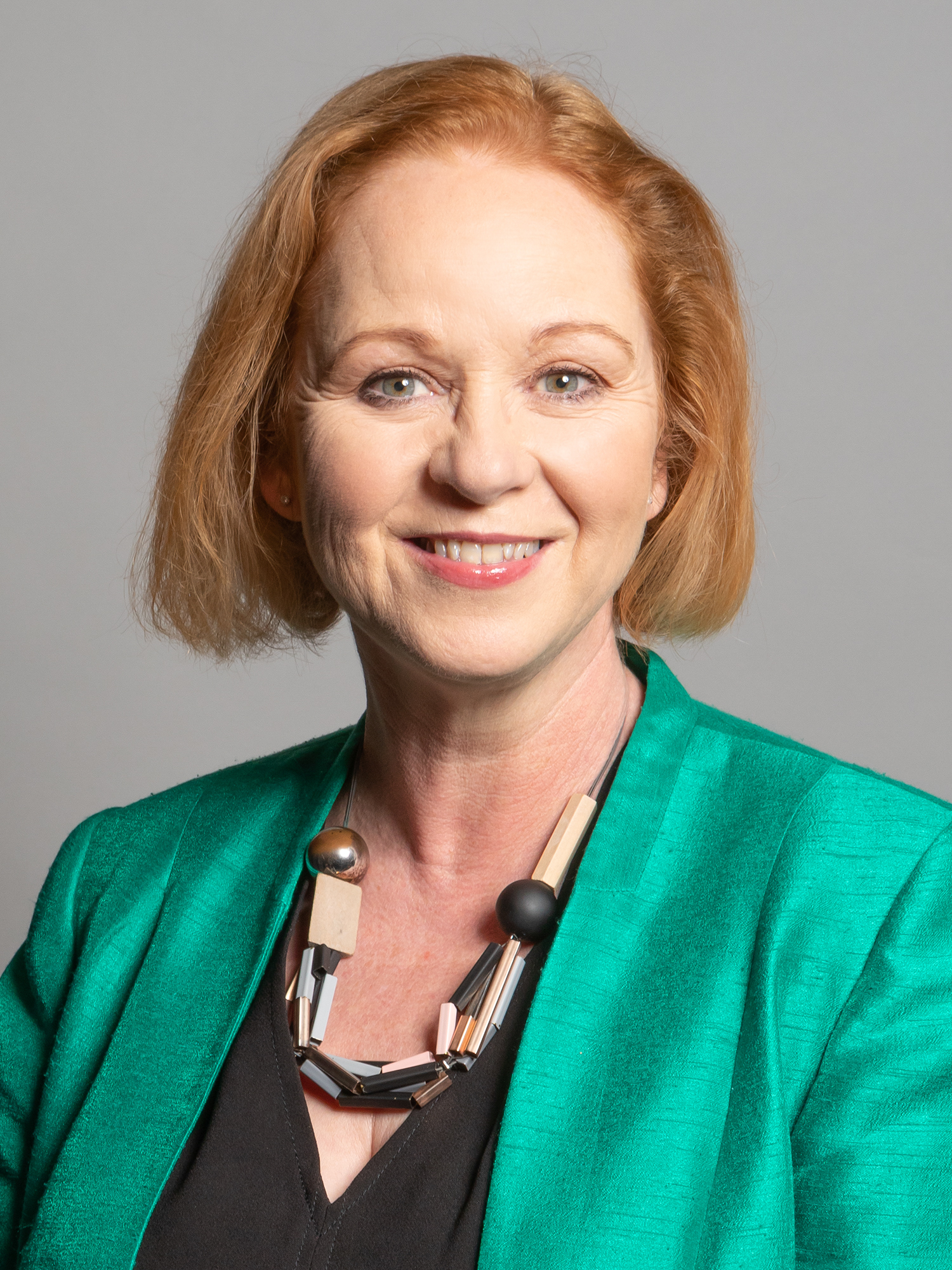
- Official portrait, 2020

Deputy Speaker of the House of Commons First Deputy Chairman of Ways and Means
- Incumbent
- Assumed office 23 July 2024
- Speaker: Lindsay Hoyle
- Preceded by: Rosie Winterton

Member of Parliament for Bradford South
- Incumbent
- Assumed office 7 May 2015
- Preceded by: Gerry Sutcliffe
- Majority: 4,362 (13.3%)

Member of Leeds City Council for Temple Newsam
- In office 3 May 2012 – 5 May 2016
- Preceded by: Bill Hyde
- Succeeded by: Debra Coupar

Member of Bradford City Council for Royds
- In office 10 June 2004 – 3 May 2007
- Preceded by: Ward established
- Succeeded by: Gill Thornton

Personal details
- Born: Judith Mary Black; 26 June 1967 (age 59)
- Party: Labour
- Education: University of Leeds; Ruskin College
- Website: Official website

Judith Mary Cummins (née Black; born 26 June 1967) is a British Labour Party politician serving as Member of Parliament (MP) for Bradford South since 2015.

== Early and personal life ==
Cummins was born on 26 June 1967 and was educated at Ruskin College and the University of Leeds, attending college as a mature student on a Trade Union scholarship.

She is married to Mark Cummins, whom she employs as a Parliamentary researcher. She has two children.

== Political career ==
Cummins was first elected as a local councillor on Bradford Council in 2004, representing the Royds ward. She served a full three-year term before not standing again at the 2007 election. Cummins was later elected as a Leeds City Councillor to represent Temple Newsam ward for a full four-year term from 2012 to 2016.

In advance of the 2015 general election, Cummins contested for selection as the prospective parliamentary candidate in the two constituencies she had been previously elected as a local ward councillor. Despite being an incumbent councillor representing Temple Newsam ward in the constituency, Cummins lost the selection for Leeds East to Richard Burgon. She was later selected by Bradford South Constituency Labour Party to stand for the seat to replace Gerry Sutcliffe.

=== Member of Parliament ===
Cummins was elected to the House of Commons to represent Bradford South on 7 May 2015, increasing the Labour candidate's majority in the constituency from 4,622 to 6,450 votes.

Cummins served as an opposition whip from September 2015 until January 2018, when she became a Shadow International Trade Minister. She departed the front bench in April 2020.

She supported Owen Smith in the failed attempt to replace Jeremy Corbyn in the 2016 Labour leadership election.

Cummins increased her majority by 250 votes to 6,700 at the 2017 general election before it fell to 2,346 in 2019.

On 19 July 2021, she was appointed Acting Deputy Speaker of the House of Commons in place of Dame Rosie Winterton who was self-isolating due to COVID-19, and she held the position till the summer recess. Cummins was elected as a Deputy Speaker to succeed Winterton in the House of Commons on 23 July 2024.

Parliament of the United Kingdom
Preceded by Gerry Sutcliffe	Member of Parliament for Bradford South; 2015–present	Incumbent
Preceded by Dame Rosie Winterton	First Deputy Chair of Ways and Means; 2024-present	Incumbent
