= Thomas Torney =

British politician (1915–1998)

The Right Honourable Thomas William Torney

Member of Parliament for Bradford South
- In office 18 June 1970 – 18 May 1987
- Preceded by: George Craddock
- Succeeded by: Bob Cryer

Personal details
- Born: 2 July 1915
- Died: 21 October 1998 (aged 83)
- Party: Labour

Thomas William Torney (2 July 1915 – 21 October 1998) was a British Labour Party politician.

Tourney joined the Labour Party, and in 1945 became its election agent for Wembley North. The following year, he began working full-time for the Union of Shop, Distributive and Allied Workers (USDAW) as its Derby and District Area Organiser, although he took time out at the 1964 United Kingdom general election to act as election agent in West Derbyshire.

Torney was Member of Parliament for Bradford South from 1970 until his retirement at the 1987 general election. His successor was Bob Cryer. In the 1983 general election, Torney had narrowly evaded defeat to the Conservative landslide by 110 votes. The BBC Election Night programme that year later reported that he was taken ill at the count and rushed to hospital.

Parliament of the United Kingdom
Preceded by George Craddock	Member of Parliament for Bradford South; 1970–1987	Succeeded by Bob Cryer
