= Colin Burgon =

British Labour Party politician

Member of Parliament for Elmet
- In office 1 May 1997 – 12 April 2010
- Preceded by: Spencer Batiste
- Succeeded by: Constituency abolished

Personal details
- Born: 22 April 1948 (age 78) Leeds, England
- Party: Labour
- Education: Huddersfield Polytechnic; Carnegie College, Leeds

Colin Burgon (born 22 April 1948) is a British Labour Party politician who was the Member of Parliament (MP) for Elmet from 1997 to 2010.

== Early life ==
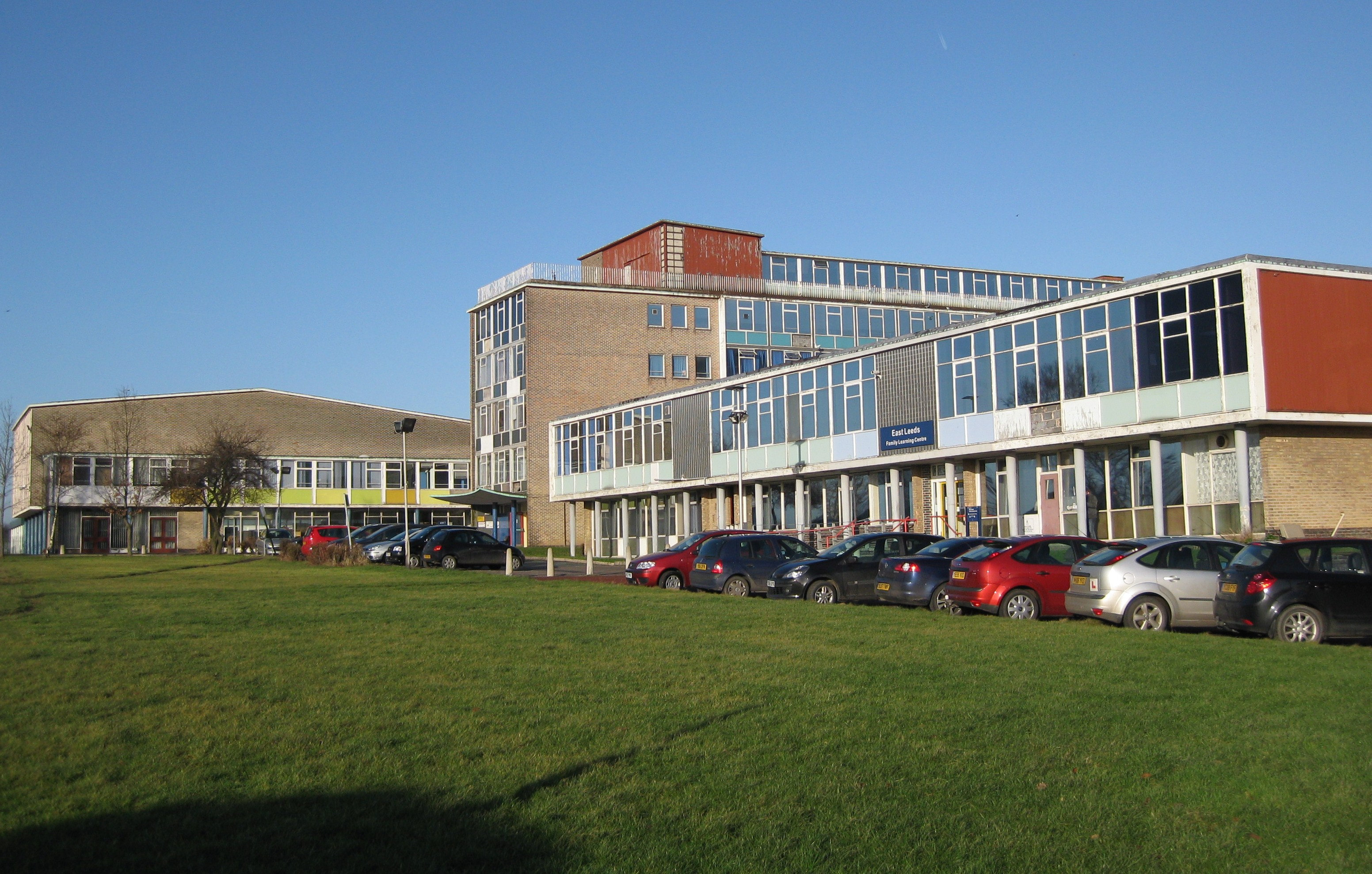
Foxwood School in Seacroft where Burgon was employed

Colin Burgon was born in Leeds to Catholic, Labour-supporting parents. His mother, Winnie, was a school secretary; his father, Tommy, was a tailor; and his brother Terence also became a teacher. He was educated at St Charles R.C. Junior School and passed the eleven-plus exam, enabling him to attend St Michael's Catholic College in Woodhouse. In later life, Burgon said that alighting the bus wearing a grammar school uniform in Gipton made him aware of the class system and made him "deplore structures that inherently deny opportunity to people".

On leaving school, Burgon trained as a teacher at Carnegie College, Leeds, then studied at Huddersfield Polytechnic. Burgon worked as a history teacher at Foxwood High School (which later became East Leeds Family Learning Centre and was demolished in 2009), a deprived secondary school in the Seacroft area of East Leeds, where he was an active member of the NUT union. Burgon left teaching and the NUT in 1987 to work for Wakefield District Council as a local government policy and research officer. He was also a research officer with the GMB Union. Burgon was made an honorary member of the National Union of Mineworkers (NUM) for his support for NUM actions in the 1984–85 miners' strike. Before he became an MP, Burgon worked with Elmet miners and their families during and after the strike.

== Parliamentary career ==
Burgon was the election agent for the Labour Party in Elmet in 1983 before being selected himself as the Labour candidate for Elmet. Burgon unsuccessfully contested Elmet in 1987 and 1992, both times coming second to the incumbent Conservative, Spencer Batiste.

In 1997, Burgon contested Elmet for the third time, finally defeating Batiste with an 8,779-vote majority. He was re-elected in 2001 and 2005. In the House of Commons, he was elected to sit on the Northern Ireland Select committee in 2000, and the Home Affairs Select Committee in 2005. Burgon has also taken interest in socialism in South America, particularly in Venezuela. In May 2007, he wrote in The Guardian in support of Venezuelan President Hugo Chávez and his government's controversial refusal to renew the broadcasting licence of a television station that had been openly supportive of the coup against Chávez's elected government. Burgon was the chairman of Labour Friends of Venezuela. He is on the left of the Labour Party and has vociferously criticised what he calls the "neo-liberal" policies the party pursued during the New Labour leaderships of Prime Ministers Tony Blair and Gordon Brown. Burgon stood down from Parliament in 2010.

== Personal life ==
Burgon is divorced and has one daughter. He has taken a keen interest in opencast mining, an important issue in Elmet. His nephew Richard Burgon has been a Labour MP since 2015.

Parliament of the United Kingdom
Preceded by Spencer Batiste	Member of Parliament for Elmet; 1997 – 2010	Succeeded by Constituency Abolished

== News items ==
- A1 upgrade in January 2003
