= Mohammad Naseem =

British Muslim leader and activist (1924–2014)

- محمد نسیم
- Born: 6 September 1924; Amritsar, British India
- Died: 22 April 2014 (aged 89)
- Known for: British Muslim leader, political activist, chairman of the Birmingham Mosque Trust (Birmingham Central Mosque)

Mohammad Naseem (Urdu: محمد نسیم; 6 September 1924 – 22 April 2014) was a British Muslim leader and political activist. Nassem worked as a GP before later becoming chairman of the Birmingham Mosque Trust (Birmingham Central Mosque), one of the largest and most prominent Islamic places of worship in the United Kingdom.

Born in Amritsar in British India in September 1924, Naseem was educated mainly in Pakistan and then in England, where he trained to become and worked as a GP for many years and also specialised in the medical procedure of circumcision, particularly for the British Muslim community. He left Pakistan and settled in Birmingham in 1951.

He was executive member of, and home affairs spokesman for, the Islamic Party of Britain.

Naseem was the main practitioner of male circumcision in the region and was based in Aston, Birmingham. He was reprimanded by the General Medical Council for circumcising a baby boy without the parents’ consent.

== History ==
In the 1970s, Naseem became involved in the establishment of a major mosque and Islamic centre in Birmingham and supported a project that had begun in the late 1950s but only got underway in the 1960s. There was great confusion at the time and many of those involved had a design for an Islamic institution but disorganisation created a lack of funds and resources to complete the grand and innovative project. Amidst debate and argument, Naseem is said to have joined the members of a loosely formed group and helped to settle disagreements by way of compromise and organisation.

The mosque project was listed as a registered charity and as a limited company and it was decided that elections would be conducted to select an official committee to run the new trust. Naseem was elected chairman and has remained chairman ever since, following an annual vote at the trust's Annual General Meeting.

== Controversy ==
=== Comments on the London bombings ===
Following the 7 July 2005 London bombings, comments made by Naseem criticizing the security services and Metropolitan Police were widely criticized by politicians including MPs Khalid Mahmood and Shadow Home Secretary David Davis. He was also criticized by Mohammed Zaki Badawi, chairman of the Council of Mosques and Imams. He was condemned further after he compared Prime Minister Tony Blair to Adolf Hitler in the same week and generated national debate over the role of mosque representatives in Britain. When a videotape emerged featuring suspected bomber Mohammad Sidique Khan apparently explaining why he intended to attack British civilians, Naseem said that he suspected the videotape had been doctored:

We are in the 21st century. The cows can be made to look as dancing, the horses can speak like humans, so these things can be doctored or can be produced.

=== Comments on David Bell's speech ===
In a speech about citizenship education, David Bell, the chief inspector of schools in England, sparked controversy by suggesting the growth of Islamic faith schools could challenge national cohesion. He argued that while cultural diversity is valuable, it should not hinder students' understanding of their wider role in British society. Bell's comments, aimed at promoting responsible citizenship education, extended to all faith schools, including Christian and Jewish institutions. Muslim leaders criticized his remarks as "irresponsible" and "derogatory", highlighting the ongoing debate about the role of faith-based education in Britain. Naseem said:

Muslims schools do not harm social cohesion and neither do Jewish or Christian schools. Why he is picking up on Muslim schools I do not understand. Why would teaching children the principles of their faith affect community cohesion? It's unfortunate that he has made these comments.

=== Comments on Birmingham terrorist raids ===
In February 2007, British police in Birmingham arrested nine suspected terrorists. A few days later Naseem said:

Muslims are persecuted unjustly. The German people were told Jews were a threat. The same is happening here. This is a persecuting course of action that the government has taken. They have invented this perception of a threat. To justify that, they have to maintain incidents to prove something is going on.

He also said that Britain was becoming a police state. Assistant Chief Constable David Shaw responded to Naseem's comments by saying that "Despite certain labels given to those men by the media, what we are dealing with here in its purest sense is criminality", and that Naseem was wrong. He was ordered to resign after he said the government could not be trusted.

=== General Medical Council reprimand ===
In 2009, Naseem was reprimanded by the General Medical Council for circumcising a baby boy without the parents' consent. It was also found that he had failed to make an adequate clinical record of the procedure and failed to provide appropriate information about aftercare. The warning was placed on his record for five years.

=== Comment on homosexuality ===
In March 2014, the BBC Three discussion show Free Speech planned a debate on the topic of being Muslim and gay, but dropped a pre-recorded question on the matter at the request of the Birmingham Central Mosque where it was recorded. Mohammad Naseem defended this decision, suggesting a more scientific approach to understanding homosexuality and drawing a comparison between homosexuality and other undesirable behaviours. He said: "Nobody should force me to accept something, which is not acceptable".

== Politics ==
Having unsuccessfully fought the 1994 Bradford South by-election for the Islamic Party of Britain, Naseem also stood as a candidate for Respect Party in the 2005 general election, when he challenged the seat of Labour MP Khalid Mahmood in Birmingham Perry Barr. He gained over 2,000 votes (5.6%); Labour retained the seat.

Naseem was actively involved in Britain's post-9/11 anti-war movement led by the Stop the War Coalition.

== Death ==
Mohammad Naseem died at Queen Elizabeth Hospital, Birmingham on 22 April 2014, aged 89.
