= 1949 Bradford South by-election =

UK parliamentary by-election

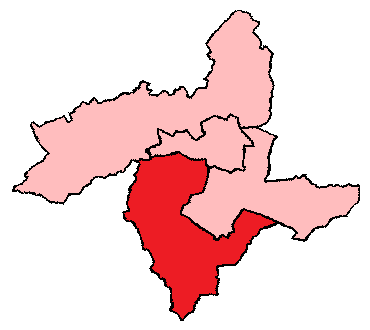
Bradford South in 1949

A by-election for the constituency of Bradford South in the United Kingdom House of Commons was held on 8 December 1949, caused by the death of the incumbent Labour MP Meredith Titterington on 28 October of that year. The result was a hold for the Labour Party, with their candidate George Craddock winning with a majority of 4,022 and 51.3% of the vote.

This was the final parliamentary by-election to be held during the 1945-1950 Parliament.

== Result ==
Bradford South by-election, 1949
Party	Candidate	Votes	%	±%
Labour	George Craddock	23,335	51.3	−1.2
National Liberal	John Lightfoot Windle	19,313	42.4	+9.3
Independent Liberal	Colin James Canning	2,882	6.3	N/A
Majority		4,022	8.9	−10.5
Turnout		45,530	74.4	−2.5
Labour hold		Swing	-5.3	

== See also ==
- Bradford South
