= William Hirst =

British politician (1873–1946)

William Hirst (1873 – 5 May 1946) was a British Labour and Co-operative politician who was the Member of Parliament (MP) for Bradford South from 1924 to 1931.

Hirst first stood for election to Parliament at the "coupon election" in 1918, when he was an unsuccessful Co-operative Party in Bradford South. He stood again in 1922 and 1923, as a Labour Co-operative candidate with the endorsement of the Labour Party, losing in both elections by a narrow margin of less than 3% of the votes.

He won the seat on his fourth attempt, at the 1924 general election, defeating the sitting Liberal MP Herbert Harvey Spencer. Hirst was re-elected in 1929 with an increased majority.

However, at the 1931 general election, the Labour Party had split over Prime Minister Ramsay MacDonald's decision to form a National government with the support of both the Conservative and Liberal parties, and Hirst was opposed in Bradford only by a Liberal candidate, the Conservatives having stepped aside. He lost his seat by a huge margin of 32.6% of the votes.

Hirts's seventh and final candidacy was at the 1935 general election, when he was defeated again, although he halved the Liberal majority to 16.8%.

Parliament of the United Kingdom
| Preceded by Herbert Harvey Spencer | Member of Parliament for Bradford South; 1924 – 1931 | Succeeded by Herbert Holdsworth |
