= Herbert Harvey Spencer =

English stuff manufacturer and trader and Liberal politician

Herbert Harvey Spencer (1869 – 23 February 1926) was an English stuff manufacturer and trader and Liberal Party politician.

== Family ==
Spencer was married and had three sons. Two died during the First World War and the third was killed in a mountaineering accident in Canada.

== Career ==
By profession Spencer was a cotton merchant and worsted manufacturer and in 1925 he gave evidence to the Board of Trade safeguarding enquiry into the worsted trade. He was sometime secretary to the Bradford and District Manufacturers’ Association and connected to the Association of Chambers of Commerce Spencer also spent some time in Australia engaged in farming and land development.

== Politics ==
=== 1901–1918 ===
Spencer was described as a fierce defender of Liberalism and was a self-declared warrior against what he called the fallacies of socialism. In 1901 he was elected as a member of Bradford Town Council. In 1913 he was adopted to fight the next election as Liberal candidate in Preston. However come the 1918 general election Spencer did not fight Preston. The two member constituency was fought and won by two Conservatives for the Lloyd George Coalition, who had presumably received the Coalition Coupon. Against them stood one Labour and one Independent Asquithian candidate, Lieutenant J J O'Neill.

=== 1922–1923 ===
Spencer was however elected to the House of Commons at the 1922 general election as an Independent Liberal at Bradford South. He faced no Lloyd George National Liberal opponent but was involved in a tight three-cornered contest with Labour and Conservative adversaries. He gained the seat from the Conservatives by the margin of 906 votes over Labour, with the Tories in third place. Spencer held his seat at the 1923 general election in a similar three-party contest, despite being unwell and unable to campaign in person. This time he held on by 675 votes over Labour.

=== 1924 ===
By the time of the 1924 general election the tide was turning against the Liberals in the aftermath of the first Labour government. During the 1924 Parliament the Liberals had often been divided over support for the government of Ramsay MacDonald. Even on the initial vote to bring down the government of Stanley Baldwin and install Labour's minority administration, ten Liberal MPs voted with the Conservatives. Spencer also defied the party whip in this period voting against the Labour government and with the Conservatives on the Evictions Bill (i.e. evictions under the Rent Restriction Act) and twice on the Housing (Financial Provisions) Bill. The sort of difficulties which beset the Liberal Party in Parliament were apparent nationally at the 1924 general election. The Liberals were finding it difficult to define their political position in relation to the Labour and Conservative parties and electorally, as the third party in a two party system, they were being targeted and squeezed by the others. These electoral currents proved too strong for Spencer and in another three-cornered fight in Bradford South he lost to Labour's William Hirst, even falling to the bottom of the poll behind the Conservatives.

=== Appointments ===
In 1924, Spencer was appointed to sit on a Board of Trade committee to look into bankruptcy law. He was a strong adherent of Free Trade and land value taxation.

== Golf ==
Spencer was a keen golfer and played in many tournaments. He also played for the House of Commons and was sometime member of the Golf Championship Committee.

== Death ==
Spencer died in London on 23 February 1926 aged 56.

Parliament of the United Kingdom
Preceded by Vernon Willey	Member of Parliament for Bradford South; 1922 – 1924	Succeeded by William Hirst
