= George Craddock =

British politician (1897–1974)

George Craddock (26 February 1897 – 28 April 1974) was a British Labour politician.

Born in Kettering, Craddock was educated at Fircroft College in Bournville, and then at the University of Birmingham. He became active in the Labour Party, serving as a full-time political agent from 1929 until 1936, after which he became an area organiser with the National Union of Distributive and Allied Workers, based in Sheffield. He won election to Sheffield City Council, serving until 1950.

He was elected Member of Parliament (MP) for Bradford South at a 1949 by-election. Within weeks, the 1950 general election had been called, and Craddock achieved the unusual feat of being elected twice before making his maiden speech. He served until his retirement at the 1970 general election. From November 1954 until April 1955, his Labour Party whip was withdrawn.

He should not be confused with Sir George Beresford Craddock who served as a Conservative MP at around the same time.

Parliament of the United Kingdom
Preceded by Meredith Titterington	Member of Parliament for Bradford South; 1949–1970	Succeeded by Thomas Torney
