= Vernon Willey, 2nd Baron Barnby =

British landowner and politician (1884-1982)

Francis Vernon Willey 2nd Baron Barnby, CMG, CBE, MVO, TD
- Vernon Willey, 2nd Baron Barnby

Member of Parliament for Bradford South
- In office 1918–1922
- Preceded by: New constituency
- Succeeded by: Herbert Harvey Spencer

Personal details
- Born: 29 September 1884 Nottinghamshire, England
- Died: 30 April 1982 (aged 97)
- Party: Unionist (Conservative)
- Spouse: Banning Grange (m. 1940)
- Parent: Francis Willey, 1st Baron Barnby (father)
- Education: Eton College
- Alma mater: Magdalen College, Oxford
- Military career
- Allegiance: United Kingdom
- Branch: British Army
- Service years: 1916-1920
- Rank: Lieutenant-Colonel
- Unit: Sherwood Rangers Yeomanry
- Conflicts: World War I; Gallipoli campaign

Francis Vernon Willey, 2nd Baron Barnby, CMG, CBE, MVO, TD (29 September 1884 – 30 April 1982) was an English aristocrat, soldier and politician.

He was the son of Francis Willey, 1st Baron Barnby and was educated at Eton and Magdalen College, Oxford University, (B.A.,1906, M.A.,1908). He succeeded his father as 2nd Baron Barnby in 1929, inheriting the Blyth estate.

He served as Lieutenant-Colonel commanding the Sherwood Rangers Yeomanry, and was later (with the same rank) Assistant Director of Equipment and Ordnance for the War Office, 1916–20. He fought in World War I serving in Egypt and Gallipoli.

He was the Unionist (Conservative) Member of Parliament for Bradford South, from 1918 to 1922. He was President of the Federation of British Industries (a predecessor of the CBI), 1925–26, a member of the Central Electricity Board 1927–46, a member of the Overseas Settlement Board from 1937, and Chev. of the Legion of Honour. He was also Master of the Blankney Hunt in 1919 and 1933. In business, he was a director of Lloyds Bank.

Lord Barnby, despite his advancing years, was an active parliamentarian and attended the House of Lords regularly. He was an early member of the Conservative Monday Club, stating at a club function in 1964 "where would the black African population of Rhodesia have been by now without the civilizing influence of the white population?". In April 1967 he contributed an essay on "Rhodesia" to the Monday Club Newsletter. He was Chairman of the club's Action Fund 1969–71, and was co-opted onto the club's Executive Council on 11 May 1970. In the House of Lords in September 1972 he called for the government to suspend aid to Idi Amin's Uganda and in April 1975 he addressed the club's Africa Group in a committee room at the House of Lords following his recent visit to South Africa and Rhodesia.

On his death without male issue, the barony of Barnby became extinct. He had married on 20 November 1940, Banning, daughter of the late William Drayton Grange, from Pennsylvania.

Coat of arms of Vernon Willey, 2nd Baron Barnby
Crest In front of a reindeer’s head erased Proper two crosses patée Gules. Escutcheon Per pale Or and Gules three chevronels counterchanged over all a pale Ermine charged with three martlets Sable. Supporters On either side a reindeer Proper charged on the shoulder with a rose Gules. Motto Propositi Tenax

Parliament of the United Kingdom
New constituency	Member of Parliament for Bradford South; 1918 – 1922	Succeeded by Herbert Harvey Spencer
Peerage of the United Kingdom
Preceded by Francis Willey	Baron Barnby; 1929–1982	Extinct
