= Gerry Sutcliffe =

British politician (born 1953)

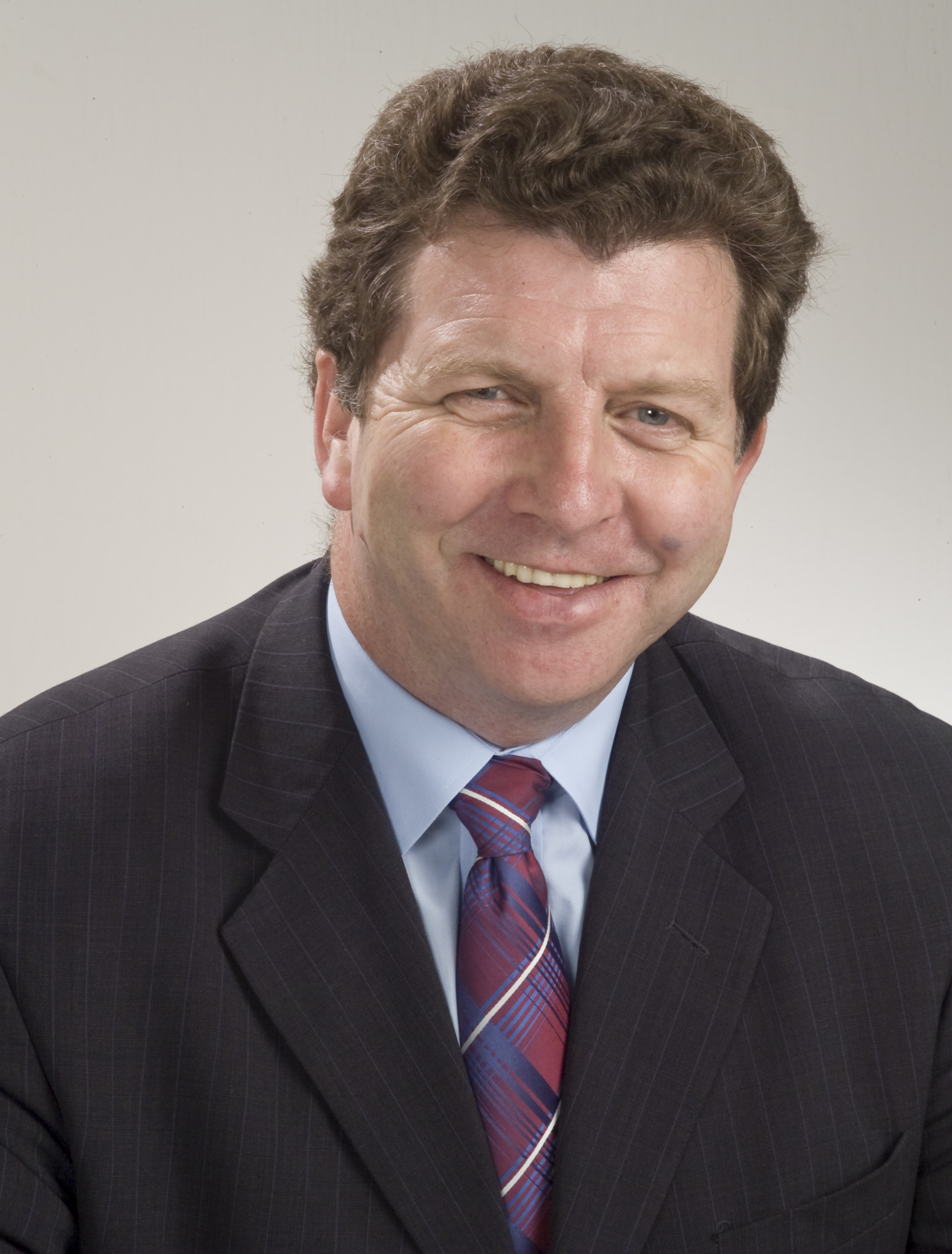
- Sutcliffe as Minister for Sport

Parliamentary Under-Secretary of State for Sport
- In office 29 June 2007 – 11 May 2010
- Prime Minister: Gordon Brown
- Preceded by: Richard Caborn
- Succeeded by: Hugh Robertson

Parliamentary Under-Secretary of State for Prisons and Probation Services
- In office 5 May 2006 – 29 June 2007
- Prime Minister: Tony Blair
- Preceded by: Fiona Mactaggart
- Succeeded by: Maria Eagle

Parliamentary Under-Secretary of State for Consumer and Competition Policy
- In office 13 June 2003 – 5 May 2006
- Prime Minister: Tony Blair
- Preceded by: Melanie Johnson
- Succeeded by: Position abolished

Vice-Chamberlain of the Household
- In office 8 June 2001 – 13 June 2003
- Prime Minister: Tony Blair
- Preceded by: Graham Allen
- Succeeded by: Jim Fitzpatrick

Member of Parliament for Bradford South
- In office 9 June 1994 – 30 March 2015
- Preceded by: Bob Cryer
- Succeeded by: Judith Cummins

Personal details
- Born: 13 May 1953 (age 73) Salford, Lancashire, England
- Party: Labour

Gerard Sutcliffe (born 13 May 1953) is a British Labour Party politician who was Member of Parliament (MP) for Bradford South from 1994 to 2015. He was the Minister for Sport and Tourism in the Brown Government.

== Biography ==
Born in Salford, Sutcliffe was educated in Bradford at Cardinal Hinsley Grammar School, but left aged sixteen, and then worked as a salesman and for a printers company, becoming a deputy branch secretary of the print workers trade union SOGAT. He was a member of Bradford City Council from 1982 to 1994, serving as the council's leader from 1992 to 1994.

When Bradford South's Labour MP Bob Cryer was killed in a car crash in April 1994, Sutcliffe was selected as the Labour candidate for the resulting by-election. He won the by-election with 55% of the vote, and held the seat until he stood down in 2015.

In Parliament, he served on the Public Accounts Committee from 1996 to 1998, and was a member of the Unopposed Bills Panel from 1997 to 1999.

After the 1997 general election, when a Labour government took power under Tony Blair, Sutcliffe was appointed as Parliamentary Private Secretary (PPS) to Harriet Harman, the Secretary of State for Social Security. After Harman was dismissed from the Cabinet in July 1998, he served as PPS to Stephen Byers, the Chief Secretary to the Treasury. When Byers was promoted to Secretary of State for Trade and Industry in December 1998, Sutcliffe remained his PPS.

From 2003 to 2006 he was Parliamentary Under Secretary of State at the Department of Trade and Industry, with responsibility for employment and for consumer and competition policy. In the May 2006 reshuffle he was moved to the Home Office, as Minister for Prisons and the Probation Service. As part of the reorganisation of the Home Office he became Parliamentary Under Secretary of State at the newly formed Ministry of Justice in May 2007. He stayed there only a short time until the reshuffle on 29 June 2007, when he was moved to the Department for Culture, Media and Sport.

As Minister for Sport at the time of the Beijing Olympics he entered a wager with his Australian counterpart Kate Ellis that Great Britain would finish above Australia in the final medal table, with each Minister promising to wear the opposite nation's colours to a sporting event if they lose. Sutcliffe won the bet, with Britain finishing fourth and Australia sixth.

Sutcliffe supported Andy Burnham in the 2010 Labour Party leadership election and acted as Burnham's campaign manager. From 2010 until 2011, Sutcliffe served as Shadow Minister for Immigration. In May 2014, Sutcliffe announced that he would stand down at the following general election. He is a member of Unite the Union.

Parliament of the United Kingdom
Preceded by Bob Cryer	Member of Parliament for Bradford South; 1994–2015	Succeeded by Judith Cummins
Political offices
Preceded by Richard Caborn	Minister for Sport and Tourism; 2007–2010	Succeeded by Hugh Robertson
Trade union offices
Preceded by Brenda Dean	Deputy General Secretary of the Graphical, Paper and Media Union; 1992–1994	Succeeded by Tony Burke
