= Islamic Party of Britain =

Defunct British political party

- Leader: David Musa Pidcock
- Founded: September 1989
- Dissolved: 2006
- Headquarters: Milton Keynes
- Ideology: Islamism; Anti-Capitalism; Anti-Communism
- Political position: Syncretic
- Colours: Green

Website
- islamicparty.com

The Islamic Party of Britain is a defunct political party in the United Kingdom that was active from its formation in 1989 until 2006. The IPB was opposed to both capitalism and communism. David Musa Pidcock (1942 – 5 December 2021), a Sheffield man who converted from Roman Catholicism to Islam while working as an engineer in Saudi Arabia, founded and led the party. The IPB published a quarterly magazine entitled Common Sense.

The party entered the 1992 general election, standing three unsuccessful candidates in the constituencies of Bradford, a city with a large Muslim minority, and one in a London constituency, Streatham.

== Founding ==
The Islamic Party of Britain was founded in September 1989 by Muslims who had grown dissatisfied with the Labour Party, a party that has traditionally gained the support of Muslims in Britain. Many Muslims were unhappy with the atheism of Neil Kinnock, the Labour leader, and wanted a party that would cater specifically for the needs of Muslims. Many also felt that both Labour and the Conservatives had not done enough to help Muslims in the controversy over Salman Rushdie's book The Satanic Verses.

== Performance ==
The Islamic Party never achieved a seat in either house of Parliament. Pidcock represented the party in the 1990 Bradford North by-election, earning 800 votes (2.2%), finishing fourth from ten candidates.

At the 1992 general election, the party stood candidates in each of the three constituencies in the City of Bradford. All finished in last place, with leader Pidcock in Bradford West performing best, on 471 votes (0.96%). It also stood a candidate in Streatham, coming fifth of seven candidates.

== Relations with other parties ==
In its first year, Pidcock claimed that his party was planning co-operation with the Green Party.

Members of the party have supported the Respect Party; one of their leading members, home affairs spokesman Mohammad Naseem, stood for and funded the party.

== Policies ==
The party believed in equal treatment under the law regardless of an individual's status, income or ethnicity. The IPB argued that religion is the most important thing in life. It called for reform of the British banking system to make it interest-free and Islamic, and for increased trade with the Islamic world. At one time, the party answered questions sent in by readers of its website. When answering one question, the party argued that homosexuality needed treatment, was not to be tolerated and that homosexuals should be put to death for a "public display of lewdness", a policy that was condemned by gay activist Peter Tatchell.

== See also ==
- People's Justice Party (UK)
