= Frederick Fawkes =

British Conservative politician

Major Frederick Hawksworth Fawkes (1870 – 1 February 1936) was a British Conservative Party politician.

Fawkes was the son of the Rev. Frederick Fawkes of Farnley Hall, North Yorkshire. He was educated at Eton College and Trinity Hall, Cambridge, where he was admitted in 1890, and farmed at Kirby Overblow. He was elected as Member of Parliament (MP) for the Pudsey and Otley division of the West Riding of Yorkshire at the 1922 general election, but retired from the House of Commons at the 1923 general election. He served as High Sheriff of Yorkshire for 1932–33.

Parliament of the United Kingdom
Preceded by Arthur Barrand	Member of Parliament for Pudsey & Otley; 1922 – 1923	Succeeded by Sir Francis Watson
