= Bob Cryer =

British politician (1934–1994)

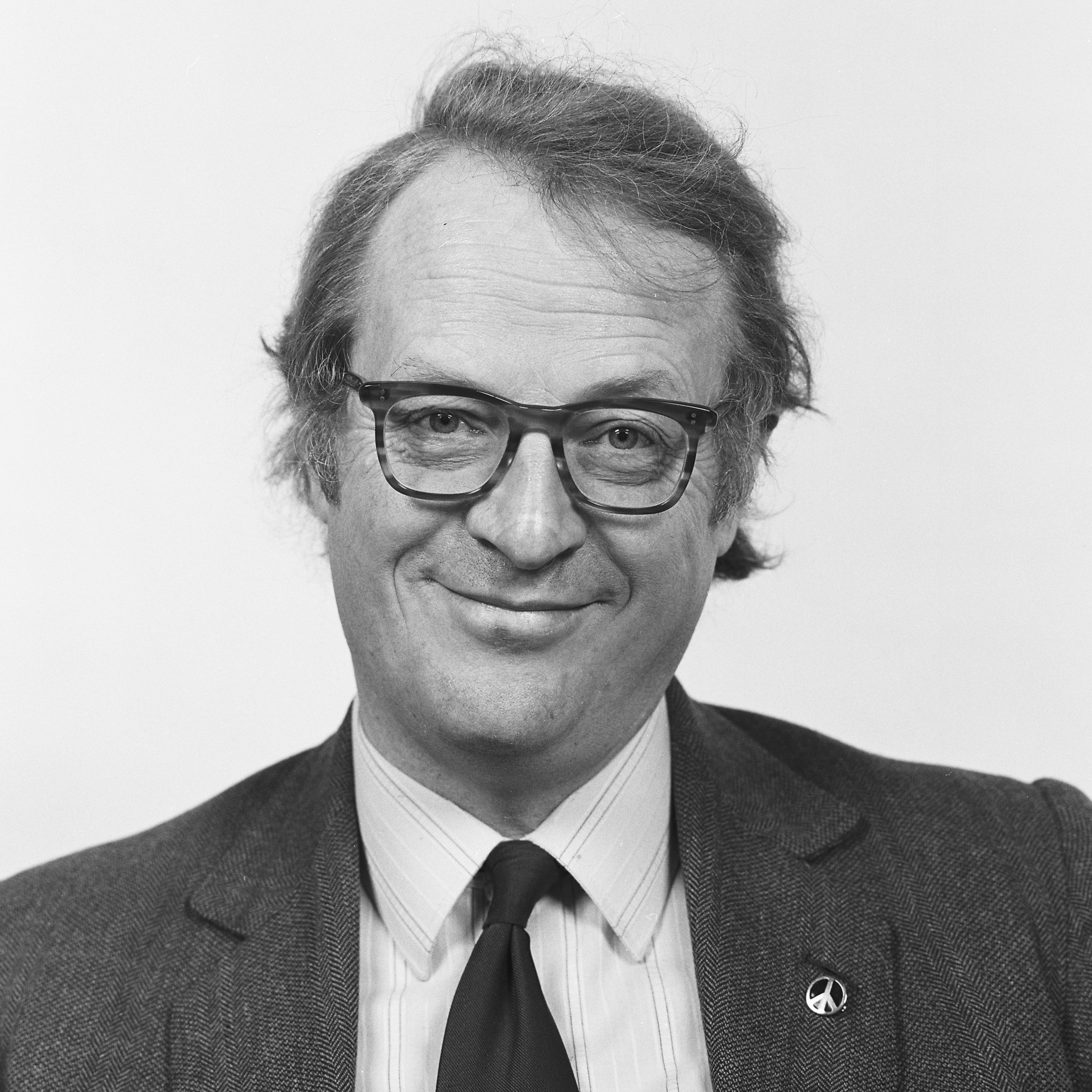
- Cryer as an MEP, 1984

Parliamentary Under-Secretary of State for Industry
- In office 10 September 1976 – 20 November 1978
- Prime Minister: James Callaghan
- Preceded by: The Lord Melchett
- Succeeded by: Les Huckfield

Member of Parliament
- In office 11 June 1987 – 12 April 1994
- Preceded by: Thomas Torney
- Succeeded by: Gerry Sutcliffe
- Constituency: Bradford South
- In office 28 February 1974 – 13 May 1983
- Preceded by: Joan Hall
- Succeeded by: Gary Waller
- Constituency: Keighley

Member of the European Parliament for Sheffield
- In office 14 June 1984 – 15 June 1989
- Preceded by: Richard Caborn
- Succeeded by: Roger Barton

Personal details
- Born: George Robert Cryer; 3 December 1934 Great Horton, West Riding of Yorkshire, England
- Died: 12 April 1994 (aged 59) Watford, Hertfordshire, England
- Party: Labour (1958–1994)
- Other political affiliations: European Socialists (1984–1989)
- Spouse: Ann Cryer (m. 1963)
- Children: John
- Education: University of Hull

George Robert Cryer (3 December 1934 – 12 April 1994) was an English Labour Party politician from Yorkshire. He sat in the House of Commons of the United Kingdom as the Member of Parliament (MP) for Keighley from 1974 until his defeat in 1983. He then served as the Member of the European Parliament (MEP) for Sheffield from 1984 to 1989, and returned to the Commons as MP for Bradford South from 1987 until his death in 1994.

He was one of the founders of the Keighley & Worth Valley Railway.

== Early life ==
Born in Bradford, Cryer was educated at Salt High School, Shipley, and the University of Hull. He worked as a teacher and lecturer.

After British Railways closed the Keighley and Worth Valley Railway line in 1962, Cryer was one of a group of people who formed the KWVR Preservation Society, which bought the line and reopened it. As the society's first chairman, he helped to facilitate the shooting of the film The Railway Children on the line in the summer of 1970 and had a small part in it, as a guard.

== Political career ==
Cryer first stood for Parliament at Darwen in 1964, but was defeated by the incumbent Conservative MP, Charles Fletcher-Cooke.

He was elected the Labour Member of Parliament for Keighley from 1974 to 1983 and represented Bradford South from 1987 until his death in a road traffic accident on 12 April 1994 when he was 59. He was the MEP for Sheffield from 1984 until 1989. In 1976, Cryer was appointed Under-Secretary of State for Industry by James Callaghan. In November 1978, Cryer resigned from his post in the Callaghan Labour government because he did not agree with the government's decision to cut off funding for the Kirkby Manufacturing and Engineering workers cooperative.

At the start of the Queen's Speech debate on 21 November 1989 – the first time the House of Commons was televised – Cryer raised a point of order on the subject of access to the House, thereby denying the Conservative MP Ian Gow, who was to move the Loyal Address to the Speech from the Throne, the accolade of being the first MP (other than the Speaker, Bernard Weatherill) to speak in the Commons on television.

Cryer served on the Board of Governors of the British Film Institute.

== Death ==
Cryer died in a car accident on 12 April 1994 when the Rover he was driving to London overturned on the M1 motorway near Junction 5 at Watford. His wife Ann survived the crash.

== Family ==
His wife Ann Cryer was MP for Keighley between 1997 and 2010, and their son John Cryer was the MP for Leyton and Wanstead.

== Filmography ==
- The Railway Children (1970) – Train Guard (uncredited)

Parliament of the United Kingdom
Preceded by Joan Hall	Member of Parliament for Keighley; February 1974–1983	Succeeded by Gary Waller
Preceded by Thomas Torney	Member of Parliament for Bradford South; 1987–1994	Succeeded by Gerry Sutcliffe
European Parliament
Preceded by Richard Caborn	Member of the European Parliament for Sheffield; 1984–1989	Succeeded by Roger Barton
