= Francis Watson (politician) =

Sir Francis Watson (7 January 1864 – 27 August 1947) was a British Conservative Party politician. He was Member of Parliament (MP) for the Pudsey and Otley division of the West Riding of Yorkshire from 1923 until retired from the House of Commons at the 1929 general election.

Parliament of the United Kingdom
Preceded by Frederick Fawkes	Member of Parliament for Pudsey & Otley; 1923 – 1929	Succeeded by Granville Gibson
