= Granville Gibson =

British politician

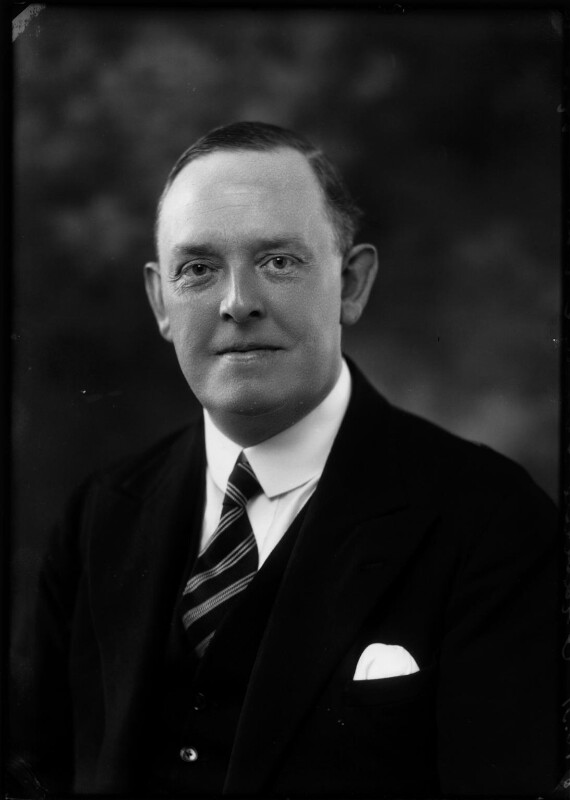
Gibson in 1931

Sir Charles Granville Gibson (8 November 1880 – 17 July 1948) was a British Conservative Party politician. He was a Member of Parliament (MP) for the Pudsey and Otley division of the West Riding of Yorkshire from 1929 to 1945.

Gibson first stood for Parliament in the 1923 general election, when he was the Liberal Party candidate in Leeds South, winning only 27% of the votes. He did not stand again until the 1929 general election, when he was the Conservative candidate in the safe seat of Pudsey and Otley. He won the seat and held it until he retired from the House of Commons at the 1945 general election.

He was knighted in King George VI's 1937 Coronation Honours for political and public services.

Parliament of the United Kingdom
Preceded by Sir Francis Watson	Member of Parliament for Pudsey & Otley; 1929 – 1945	Succeeded by Malcolm Stoddart-Scott
