= Arthur Barrand =

British politician

Arthur Rhys Barrand (28 October 1861 – 3 August 1941) was a British Liberal Party politician.

== Background ==
Barrand was born the son of Isaac Andrew Barrand in Stoke Newington. He was educated at Birkbeck School, Kingsland and at Finsbury Technical College. In 1889 he married Emily Brydon Schofield of Manchester. They settled in Bycullah Road, Enfield. He retired to live in Dunbar Road, Bournemouth.

== Professional career ==
Barrand worked as an actuary from 1895 until he was called to bar by the Middle Temple in 1906. He was the joint author of 'Bunyon's Law of Life Assurance' (5th edition). He was a financier and director of an insurance company and an Assistant Manager of the Prudential Assurance Company.

== Political career ==
Barrand was selected as Liberal candidate for Pudsey in 1914 for an election that was deferred due to the outbreak of war. Standing as a Coalition Liberal at the 1918 general election, he was elected Member of Parliament (MP) for the Pudsey and Otley division of the West Riding of Yorkshire. As a holder of the Coalition Coupon, he did not face a Unionist opponent in 1918. At the 1919 Spen Valley by-election he visited the constituency to speak in support of the Liberal candidate and against the Coalition Liberal candidate. This action ultimately led to the Unionists decision to oppose him at a future election. After 4 years in the House of Commons he was defeated at the 1922 general election by the Unionist Frederick Fawkes. He not stand again.

=== Electoral record ===
1918 United Kingdom general election: Pudsey and Otley
Party		Candidate	Votes	%	±%
C	Liberal	Arthur Barrand	13,860	75.2	n/a
	Labour	George Ripley Carter	4,583	24.8	n/a
Majority			9,277	50.4	n/a
Turnout			18,443	58.6	n/a
Registered electors			31,487		
	Liberal win (new seat)				
C indicates candidate endorsed by the coalition government.

General election 1922: Pudsey and Otley
Party	Candidate	Votes	%	±%
Unionist	Frederick Fawkes	12,396	46.5	n/a
Liberal	Arthur Barrand	8,439	31.7	−43.5
Labour	Percy Myers	5,818	21.8	−3.0
Majority		3,957	14.8	n/a
Turnout		26,653	82.0	+23.4
Registered electors		32,506		
Unionist gain from Liberal		Swing	n/a	

Parliament of the United Kingdom
New constituency	Member of Parliament for Pudsey and Otley; 1918 – 1922	Succeeded by Frederick Fawkes
