= 1973 Ripon by-election =

1973 UK Parliamentary by-election

The 1973 Ripon by-election was a parliamentary by-election held on 26 July 1973 for the British House of Commons constituency of Ripon.

The by-election took place during the 1970s Liberal revival. This seat and Isle of Ely were gained on the same day, the third and fourth Liberal gains during the Parliament. This was the first time the Liberal Party had made two by-election gains on the same day, since winning both seats in a two-member constituency at the 1899 Oldham by-election. The Party had last gained two seats, in different constituencies on the same day, at the 1896 Frome by-election and the 1896 Wick Burghs by-election held on 2 June 1896.

== Previous MP ==
The seat had become vacant when the constituency's Member of Parliament (MP), Sir Malcolm Stoddart-Scott (23 September 1901 – 15 June 1973), died. Stoddart-Scott, a Conservative, had been MP for Pudsey and Otley from 1945 - 1950 and had represented Ripon from 1950.

== Candidates ==
Four candidates were nominated. The list below is set out in descending order of the number of votes received at the by-election.

1. The Liberal Party candidate was David Austick. He was a bookseller and a West Yorkshire County Councillor. Austick was born on 8 March 1920 and died on 9 February 1997.

Austick won the by-election, in a seat in which his party had finished third in the 1970 general election. He lost the constituency to the Conservatives in the February 1974 general election. Austick subsequently contested Ripon in October 1974 and Cheadle in 1979. He also contested the Leeds constituency for the European Parliament, in the election of 1979.

2. The Conservative candidate was Keith Hampson, born on 14 August 1943. He was a former assistant to the Conservative Prime Minister, Edward Heath and a university lecturer.

After losing the by-election, Hampson was the successful Conservative candidate who re-gained the seat in February 1974. The Ripon constituency was abolished for the 1983 general election, and Hampson was then elected for Leeds North West. At the 1997 general election he was defeated by Labour candidate Harold Best.

3. Representing the Labour Party was D.M. English, who also contested the seat in February 1974.

4. R.E.G. Simmerson, the Chairman of a body called Democratic Conservatives Against the Common Market, contested the by-election. Craig classified him as an Independent Conservative candidate.

== Result ==
1973 by-election: Ripon
Party	Candidate	Votes	%	±%
Liberal	David Austick	13,902	43.5	+30.4
Conservative	Keith Hampson	12,956	40.5	−20.2
Labour	D.M. English	4,435	13.9	−12.3
Ind. Conservative	R.E.G. Simmerson	690	2.1	New
Majority		946	3.0	N/A
Turnout		31,983	64.3	−9.3
Registered electors		49,761		
Liberal gain from Conservative		Swing		

== See also ==
- Ripon constituency
- List of United Kingdom by-elections
- United Kingdom by-election records
