= Arthington (disambiguation) =

Arthington is a small village in Wharfedale, in the City of Leeds metropolitan borough in West Yorkshire, England.

Arthington may also refer to:

== People with the given name ==
- Arthington Worsley (1861–1944), a British botanist, explorer and civil engineer

== People with the surname ==
- Henry Arthington (1615–1671), an English politician who sat in the House of Commons
- Robert Arthington (1823–1900), a British investor, philanthropist and premillennialist

== Other uses ==
- Arthington, Liberia, a small town in Montserrado County
- Arthington Viaduct
- Arthington Priory
- Arthington railway station
