= Summercross =

Summercross may refer to:

- Sommarkrysset, Swedish tv programme
- Summercross, band featuring former UK politician Greg Mulholland
