= Political Animal =

Political Animal or Political Animals may refer to:

- A term used by the ancient Greek philosopher Aristotle in his Politics to refer to a human being
- Political Animals (TV miniseries), a United States drama
- Political Animal (radio show), a British comedy show
- Political Animals (rugby), a sports team of politicians
- Political Animals (video game), a 2016 government simulation game
- "Political Animal", a blog hosted at Washington Monthly magazine
- Political Animals, a documentary film featuring the first openly LGBT California legislators; see California Legislative LGBTQ Caucus

== See also ==
- Non-human electoral candidates
