= Creskeld Hall =

Country house in Leeds, West Yorkshire, England

Coordinates: 53.8943°N 1.6063°W

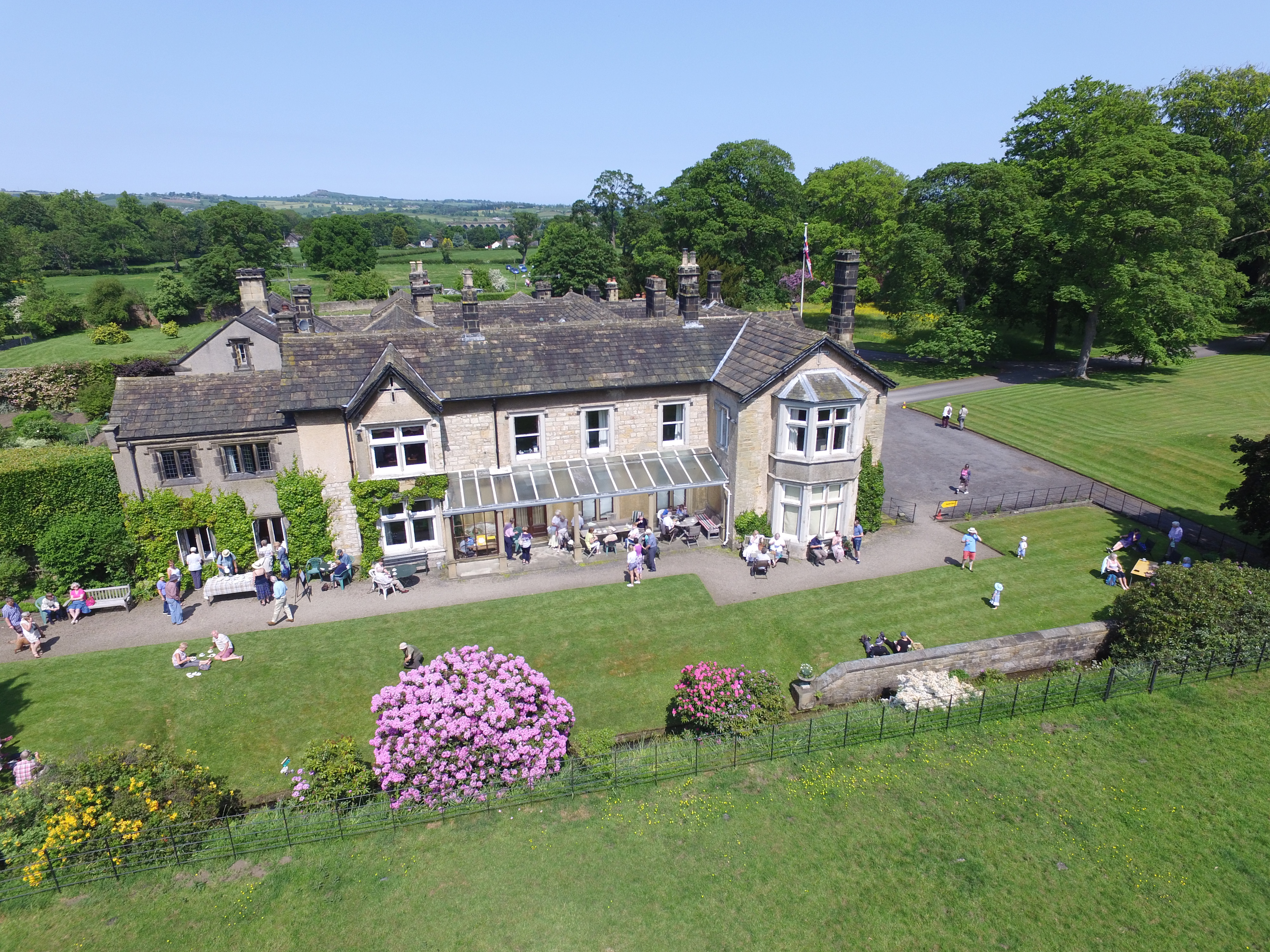
The south elevation of Creskeld Hall showing the terrace and glass verandah attached to the house

Creskeld Hall is a grade II listed Country House located in Arthington, near Otley, West Yorkshire, England.

== Etymology ==
The place-name is first attested in the twelfth century, as Creskeld and Creskelde. The name comes from the Old English words cresse ('cress') and kelde ('spring, well', itself a borrowing of Old Norse kelda). Thus the name once meant 'spring with cress growing nearby'. The place-name thus suggests that the settlement dates back to before the Norman Conquest of England. A spring of fresh water flows past the Hall all year round; and watercress grows in abundance in the streams and water gardens.

== History ==
In 1189, Hugo de Creskeld gave all his land at Creskeld with an annual rent of 6d and a common pasture of 260 sheep to Kirkstall Abbey. A chapel was attached to the house before the end of the 12th century. The Manor House was leased to Sir Richard de Goldsbro and in 1352 a deed was executed between Sir Richard de Goldsboro and Robert Tottie relating to the granting of Creskeld wood for the smelting of iron. This deed is said to be the oldest deed relating to that industry now in existence.

At the dissolution of the Monasteries, the Manor of Creskeld passed into the hands of Thomas Cranmer, a nephew of the famous Archbishop Cranmer. In 1596 the Wentworth family from Wakefield occupied the Hall and rented it for £15 a year. In 1660, it was inherited by Evelild, the eldest daughter of George Wentworth, who was the wife of John Thornhill of Fixby.

In 1846, Francis Rhodes of Bramhope Hall, the next door estate, married the only child of the owner of the Hall Charlotte Maria Cooper Darwin. He assumed her surname and arms in 1850 upon inheritance of Elston Hall from Robert Alvey Darwin and they took up residence at Creskeld Hall. The estate thus came into the ownership of the Rhodes family, who had been in Wharfedale for many centuries.

Francis (Rhodes) Darwin was born in 1825. He became a barrister, then a magistrate and was Chairman of the Highways Committee and Alderman of the new West Riding of Yorkshire County Council for more than 50 years. He died in 1918 at the age of 93.

== Recent history ==
The present Hall at Creskeld occupies the site of the original Manor house and there are parts in the centre which date back to the 1600s, with very old oak beams. Much of the rest of the building was built between 1850 and 1920 and includes a chapel room that was rebuilt after a fire in 1870. This was never re-consecrated and is now part of the main house. A flat-roofed billiard room extension was added in 1919. This connects the rebuilt chapel with the main body of the house, and has enclosed a courtyard where the front entrance used to be.

The Hall has been privately owned by the same family since 1919 being purchased by Bertram Parkinson, the grandfather of the current owners. It was then the home of Colonel Sir Malcolm Stoddart-Scott OBE MC TD, Member of Parliament of the local constituency from 1945 until his death in 1973.

== Creskeld Herd ==
Bertram Parkinson founded the Creskeld Herd of British Friesians in 1920, obtaining both a bull and females from a 1922 South African importation and by careful additional purchase accumulated a very good team which won many championships, both pre and post the Second World War. He was President of the British Friesian Cattle Society in 1949. Sir Malcolm Stoddart-Scott continued to develop the herd following Bertram's death in 1953 and had much show ring success in 1966–67 and later. The herd was fully dispersed at a sale in 2013 on the retirement of the Head Herdsman for over 40 years.

== Television ==
The Hall is known to many people as Home Farm from the ITV soap Emmerdale and has been used on the show since the first series commissioned following the pilot series in 1972. Internal scenes have been shot in ITV's Leeds studio since the 1990s and a purpose built facade was used for a short period in 2014 at the Emmerdale village on the Harewood Estate. Over the years the filming of Emmerdale has included memorable scenes such as the 1997 death of David Glover in a fire which was filmed with a temporary structure built on the Hall's billiard room. In 2005 Zoe Tate destroyed the house by setting off a gas explosion which was filmed with the erection of a false facade on the eastern elevation of the Hall.

Creskeld has also been used for other television programmes over the years including, Century Falls, The Attic: The Hiding of Anne Frank, The Darling Buds of May, Anton Mosimann – Naturally, and Secrets of the Royal Kitchen.

== Gardens ==
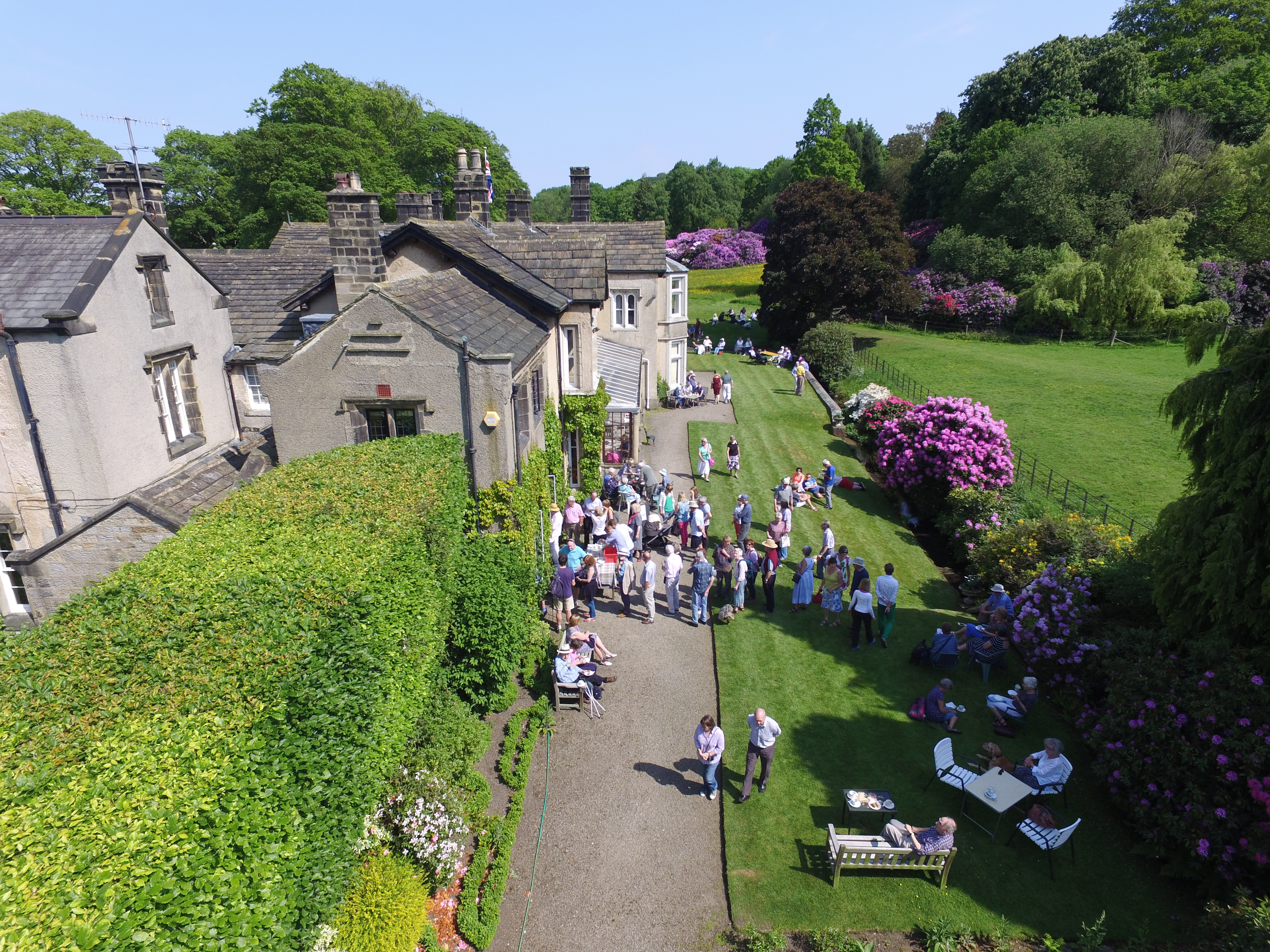
Looking east along the south terrace of Creskeld Hall during the 2018 NGS open garden

The gardens of Creskeld Hall have been open to the public annually for over 10 years as part of the National Gardens Scheme (NGS) "Yellow Book", with the proceeds being split between the National Garden Scheme, and a charity of the owner's choice. The hall sits in approximately 3.5 acres (14,000 m^{2}) of garden, with a beech tree avenue, and has many rare colours of Rhododendron and Azalea collected by one of the family in the 1930s. The hall was originally part-surrounded by a moat, which is still visible in the garden and the gardens were laid out in various styles from 1825 until 1936, when the water garden was completed for Bertram Parkinson. The grounds also boast a terrace, walled vegetable garden, croquet lawn, canals, woodland plantings, and a specimen of a mature Monkey Puzzle tree.

== See also ==
- Listed buildings in Arthington
