= Katie White (politician) =

British politician

Katie White OBE MP
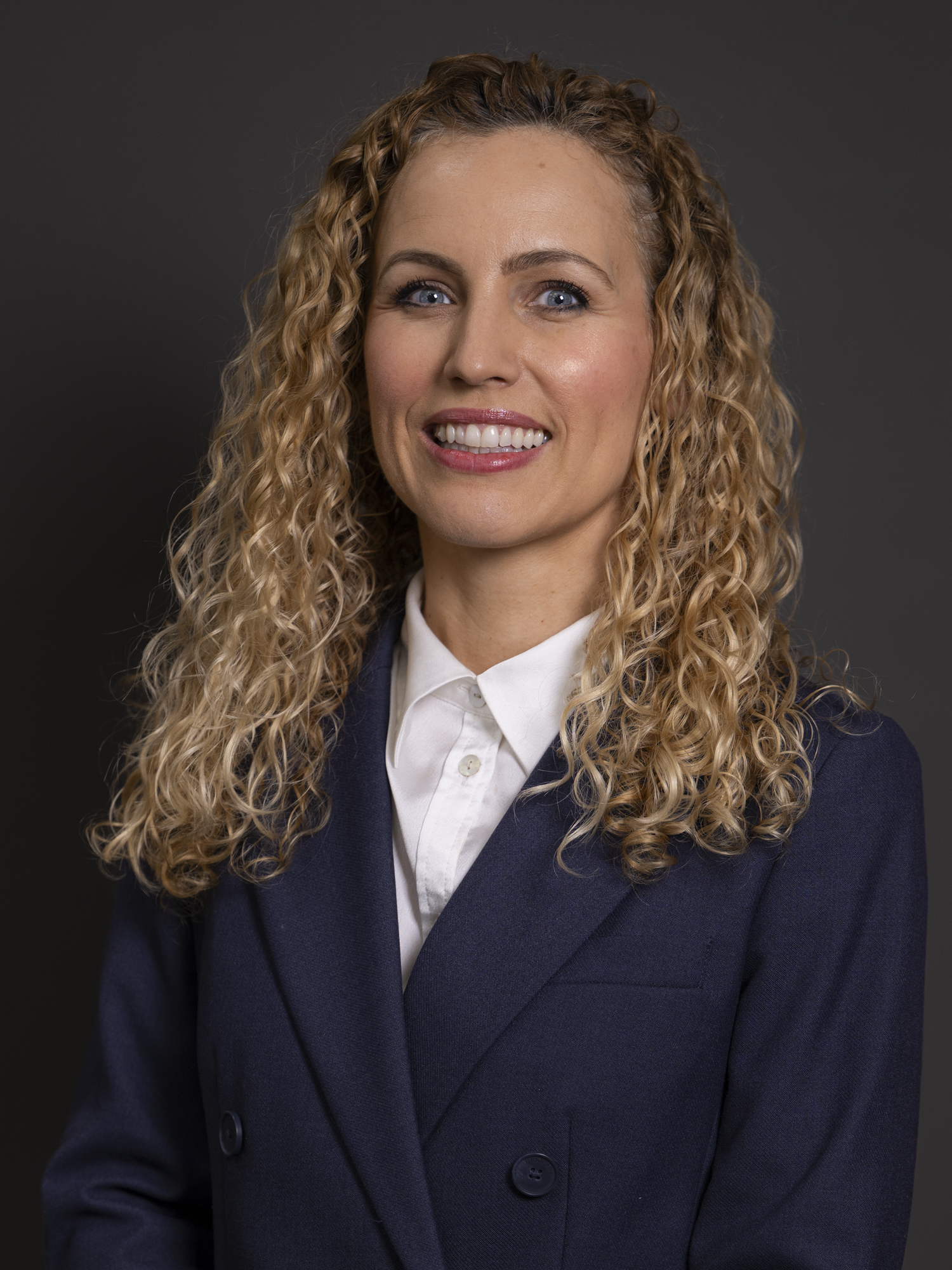
- Official portrait, 2025

Minister of State for Climate Transition (Note: Parliamentary Under-Secretary of State for Climate until 21 July 2026)
- Incumbent
- Assumed office 7 September 2025
- Prime Minister: Keir Starmer; Andy Burnham
- Preceded by: Kerry McCarthy

Member of Parliament for Leeds North West
- Incumbent
- Assumed office 4 July 2024
- Preceded by: Alex Sobel
- Majority: 11,896 (23.9%)

Personal details
- Born: Katie Jayne White; 1980 or 1981 (age 45–46) Leeds, West Yorkshire, England
- Party: Labour
- Spouse: Sam White
- Education: University of Glasgow (MA)
- Website: katie4leedsnw.com

Katie Jayne White (born 1980 or 1981) is a British politician who has served as the Labour Party Member of Parliament for Leeds North West since 2024.

== Early life and education ==
White was born and grew up in Adel, Leeds. She was privately educated at Leeds Girls' High School, and received a Master of Arts degree in Politics from the University of Glasgow in 2003.

== Career before Parliament ==
After graduating White did an internship in Washington DC where she first became interested in the issue of climate change. She went on to work at Friends of the Earth; during her time there she co-led the campaign for the Climate Change Act 2008.

In 2009 White aided the UK government to prepare for the United Nations Climate Change Conference in Copenhagen, and went on to work at the newly created Department of Energy and Climate Change. From October 2012 to April 2014 she was European campaigns director of One.org, and she then became an independent campaigns director.

She worked for WWF as Director for Campaigns and Advocacy from September 2019 to April 2024, and in 2019 she joined private school operator Nord Anglia Education, leading their charitable foundation. White is a trustee of the Mindfulness Initiative, which works with politicians to introduce the practice of mindfulness into policy-making.

== Parliamentary career ==
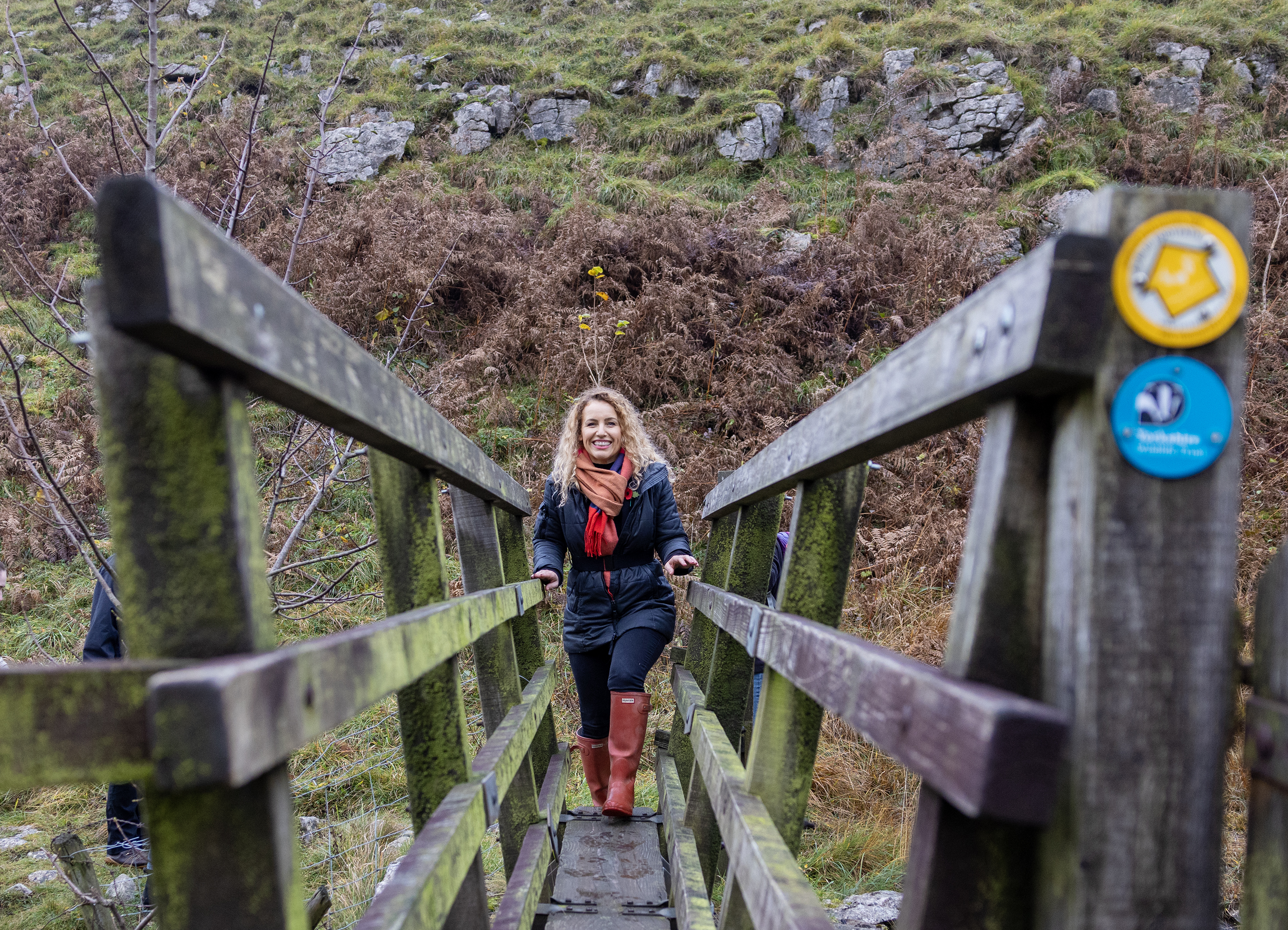
White at new reserve in Yorkshire

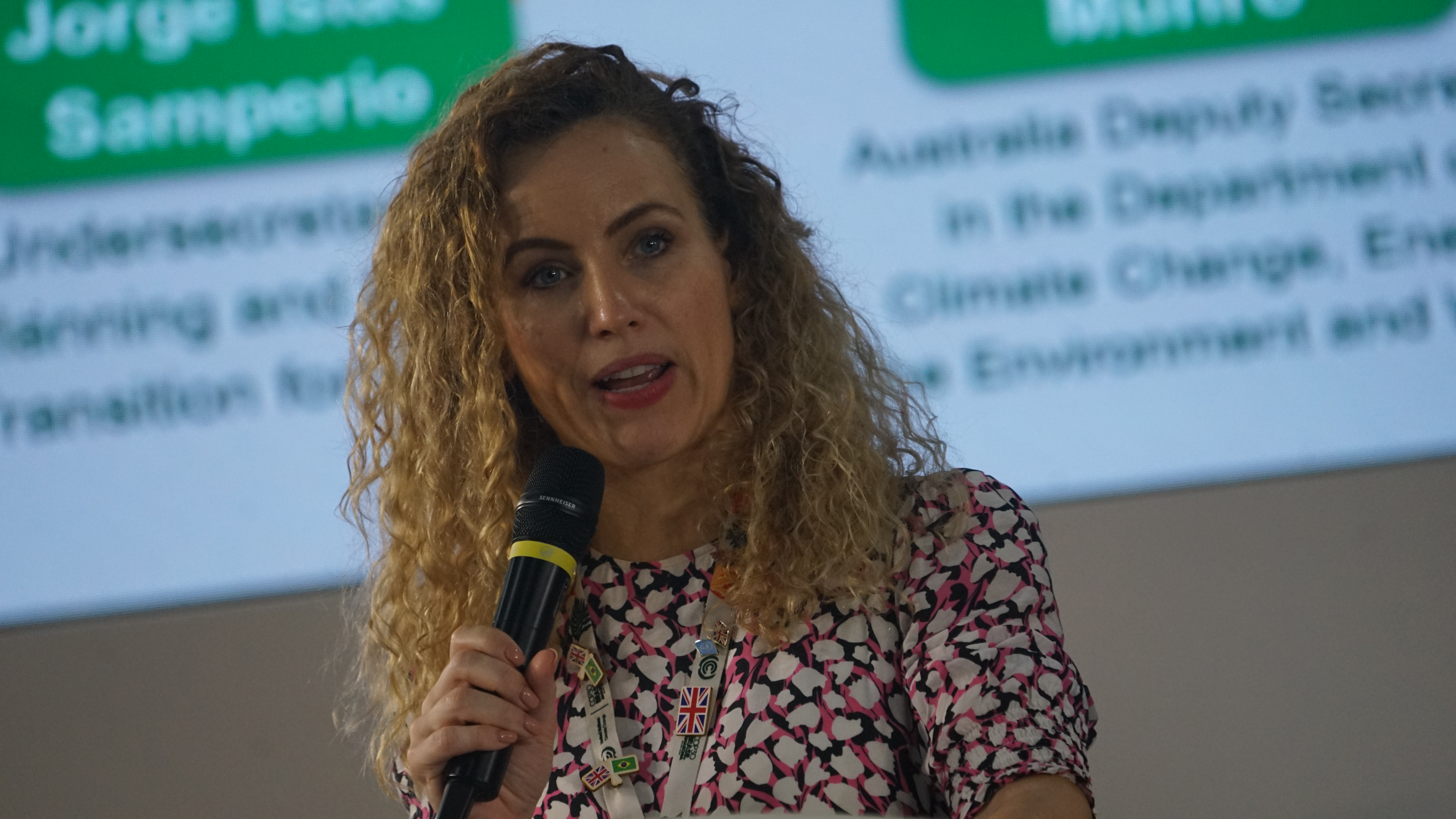
White at COP30 in 2025

Following a hustings in Leeds North West in November 2023, White was selected as the Labour Party candidate for the next general election; this was later called to take place on 4 July 2024. She won the seat with 46% of the vote and a majority of 11,896 over the second-placed Conservative candidate. There were a total of seven candidates, and a turnout of 70%.

Although Alex Sobel had previously held Leeds North West for Labour, boundary changes following the 2023 boundary changes meant that the notional 2019 result for the current seat was Conservative, so the result was described as a "Labour gain from Conservative". White is the first female MP to be elected to the Leeds North West constituency.

In the 2025 British cabinet reshuffle, she was appointed as a junior minister by Keir Starmer. In July 2026, she was appointed to the new government as Minister of State at the Department for Energy Security and Net Zero by Andy Burnham.

== Awards ==
White's campaigning work led to her being appointed OBE in the 2013 Birthday Honours. She was described in the official citation as "lately Head of International and UK Engagement, Department of Energy and Climate Change", and the award was "For services to tackling Climate Change Engagement in the UK and overseas".

== Personal life ==
White is married to Sam White and has two children.

== Notes ==
Parliament of the United Kingdom
Preceded by Alex Sobel	Member of Parliament for Leeds North West; 2024–present	Incumbent
