= Listed buildings in Arthington =

Arthington is a civil parish in the metropolitan borough of the City of Leeds, West Yorkshire, England. It contains 17 listed buildings that are recorded in the National Heritage List for England. Of these, one is listed at Grade II*, the middle of the three grades, and the others are at Grade II, the lowest grade. The parish contains the village of Arthington and is otherwise rural. Most of the listed buildings are houses, cottages and associated structures, farmhouses and farm buildings. The other listed buildings consist of a railway viaduct, a church, and a former wagon house.

== Key ==
Grade	Criteria
II*	Particularly important buildings of more than special interest
II	Buildings of national importance and special interest

== Buildings ==
Name and location	Photograph	Date	Notes	Grade
Creskeld Hall; 53.89447°N 1.60626°W		Late medieval	A large house dating mainly from the 19th century with an irregular plan around a courtyard. The older parts are the kitchen wing forming the west range, and a former chapel in the north range. There are two storeys and two entrance fronts, each with a porch and a cross window above. The gables are coped with kneelers and a ball finial.	II
The Nunnery; 53.90172°N 1.56193°W		1585	The house, which incorporates earlier material, is in sandstone with quoins and a stone slate roof. Thee are three storeys and a T-shaped plan, with a front of three bays, a continuous rear outshut, and a short rear wing. The doorway has a Tudor arch with dated and initialled shields in the spandrels, and above it is a two-storey oriel window. The other windows are mullioned with four or five lights.	II*
Barn and stable, Warren Farm; 53.89963°N 1.60243°W	—	17th century	The barn is the earlier, the stable dating from the 18th century. The buildings are in sandstone with quoins, the barn has an asbestos roof, and the roof of the stable is in stone slate. The barn has five bays and aisles. It contains opposed wagon entries, one with a segmental-headed arch, a porch with a cambered lintel, and doorways. In the south gable end is a circular pitching hole, and the north gable end has external steps to a loft. The stable has two storeys and three bays, and contains a square-headed doorway, square windows and a loft door.	II
High Ridge Farmhouse; 53.88513°N 1.60357°W	—	Late 17th century	A farmhouse later divided into two, it is in sandstone, and has a slate roof with coped gables and kneelers. There are two storeys, and a T-shaped plan, with a front range of two bays, and a single-storey rear wing. The doorway has a chamfered surround and a shaped lintel, and there is a blocked former doorway to the left. The windows are mullioned with some mullions removed. In the rear wing is an inserted doorway with a Tudor arch and a dated lintel.	II
Warren Farmhouse; 53.89974°N 1.60217°W	—	Early 18th century	The farmhouse is in sandstone with quoins, and a Welsh slate roof with coped gables. There are two storeys, a double-depth plan, and two bays. The doorway has a plain surround, above it is an oculus, and the other windows are mullioned. In the left gable end is an inserted doorway, and a blocked doorway above with a dated and initialled lintel. At the rear is a two-light stair window.	II
Former stable block, Arthington Hall; 53.90040°N 1.58428°W	—	Early to mid 18th century	The stable block, later converted for residential use, is in sandstone with quoins, bracketed eaves, and a hipped stone slate roof. There are two storeys, a rectangular plan, and a symmetrical front of seven bays, the middle three bays projecting under a bracketed pediment. The central doorway has a plain surround and a moulded cornice on scrolled brackets. Most of the windows are 16-pane sashes.	II
Ha-ha, Arthington Hall; 53.89946°N 1.58433°W	—	18th century (probable)	The ha-ha is to the east of the drive leading to the hall. It is a low sandstone wall with flat coping, and it extends for about 50 metres (160 ft) from the hall to Arthington Lane.	II
Cold store south of The Grange; 53.89724°N 1.58456°W	—	18th century (probable)	The cold store is built into a bank, it is in sandstone, and has a turf roof. It is linked to an outhouse, and has a doorway with a plain surround and a rectangular lintel.	II
The Grange; 53.89750°N 1.58455°W	—	Mid to late 18th century	A farmhouse, later a private house, it is in sandstone with quoins, and a stone slate roof with coped gables and kneelers. There are three storeys, four bays, and a rear outshut. The doorway has a plain surround, the windows are sashes, some at the rear being horizontally-sliding, and there is an external flight of steps to a doorway in the top floor.	II
Dog kennel, Arthington Hall; 53.89988°N 1.58435°W	—	Late 18th century (probable)	The dog kennel is in sandstone, and is rectangular. It is composed of stone slabs, with a slab roof, and there is a round-headed doorway in the south end.	II
Dovecote, The Nunnery; 53.90199°N 1.56225°W	—	Late 18th century (probable)	The dovecote is in sandstone with a continuous stone ledge around it, and a stone slate roof with coped gables and scrolled ends. There is a rectangular plan, three low storeys, and one bay. The east front has square windows in the ground floor, an external staircase to a doorway in the middle floor, and there is another doorway above. In the south gable end is a square opening and a semicircular perching ledge, and on the apex is a weathervane.	II
Arthington Hall; 53.90016°N 1.58513°W		c. 1790 (probable)	The hall was rebuilt incorporating earlier material, and extended in 1876–78 by Alfred Waterhouse. It is in sandstone with a hipped slate roof, an irregular plan, and two storeys. The main block is rectangular with a symmetrical front of nine bays and sides of five bays. On the front, the middle five bays project, and there is a single-storey five-bay conservatory with pilasters, a cornice, and a panelled parapet. The rest of the front has sash windows, a cornice, and a balustraded parapet. At the rear is a two-bay wing containing a canted bay window with two pedimented dormers above, and the architrave of a former doorway.	II
5–10 Arthington Lane; 53.89768°N 1.59042°W	—	Early to mid 19th century	A row of six cottages with quoins, a floor band, and a slate roof. There are two storeys, a double-depth plan, and each cottage has one bay, apart from No. 5 on the right, which has an extension. The doorways and ground floor windows have plain surrounds. In the upper floor, some windows have round-arched heads and are joined by impost bands.	II
Wharfedale Viaduct; 53.90516°N 1.60178°W		1849	The viaduct was built to carry the Leeds to Thirsk Railway over the River Wharfe. It is in sandstone, it has a curved line, and there are 21 semicircular arches with rusticated stepped voussoirs. The viaduct has cutwaters with rounded noses, moulded bands and string courses, and coped parapets.	II
Crag View and Ivy Cottage; 53.89776°N 1.59112°W	—	19th century	A pair of sandstone cottages with quoins, bands, and a stone slate roof. The central block has two storeys, a double-depth plan and two bays. In the centre is a recessed doorway, and there are two three-light stepped mullioned windows in each floor. The block is flanked by two-bay wings, the inner bays recessed. In the inner bays are a doorway, converted into a window on the left side, and above is a round-headed open arch and a pierced embattled parapet. The outer bays have a sash window in the ground floor, a pierced quatrefoil above and a pierced triangular pediment.	II
Coptic Orthodox Church of St Mary and St Abanoub; 53.89750°N 1.58110°W		1864	The church is in sandstone with a slate roof, and is in Gothic style. It consists of a nave, north and south transepts, a chancel, and a north west tower incorporating a porch. The tower has three stages, angle pilasters, a north doorway, and a broach spire with lucarnes.	II
Wagon house, Water Pumping Station; 53.90295°N 1.60236°W	—	Mid to late 19th century	The wagon house is in red brick with sandstone dressings and a twin-span slate roof. Thee is a single storey and a rectangular plan. The entrance front has a moulded plinth, quoins, central and corner pilasters, bracketed cornices, two bays and two coped gables with ball finials. In each bay is a segmental-arched wagon entrance with a pendant keystone and double doors. On each side are three bays with similar features.	II
