= Ian Aitken (journalist) =

British journalist and political commentator

- Born: Ian Levack Aitken; 19 September 1927; Airdrie, Lanarkshire, Scotland
- Died: 21 February 2018 (aged 90); London, England
- Education: King Alfred School, London; Lincoln College, Oxford; London School of Economics
- Occupation: Journalist
- Years active: 1953–2014
- Employer: The Guardian
- Spouse: Catherine Mackie (m. 1956; died 2006)
- Children: 2

Ian Levack Aitken (19 September 1927 – 21 February 2018) was a British journalist and political commentator who was the political editor of The Guardian from 1975 to 1990.

== Early life ==
Aitken was born in Airdrie, Lanarkshire. His father, George, a Lanarkshire infantryman radicalised by his experiences in the first world war trenches, fought with the Republican side in the Spanish Civil War. George Aitken was also a member of the Communist Party of Great Britain; however, he resigned following the CPGB's support for the Hitler-Stalin Pact.

Aitken grew up in London. He was educated at the King Alfred School, Hampstead, Lincoln College, Oxford, and the LSE. At Oxford he befriended the future politicians Shirley Williams and Bill Rodgers. He appeared as an extra in the film A Matter of Life and Death.

Aitken served in the Fleet Air Arm from 1945 to 1948.

== Career ==
Aitken entered journalism in 1953 as the industrial correspondent of the Tribune newspaper, after a spell as a HM inspector of factories and a trade union official. The following year (1954) he joined the Daily Express. As Expressman Aitken he reported from Havana when Fidel Castro entered the city. He filled a number of positions at the paper before joining The Guardian in 1964, where for 10 years he was political correspondent. From 1975 to 1990 he was The Guardian's political editor, succeeded by Michael White. He continued to write for the newspaper until 1992, and then became a columnist for the New Statesman from 1993 to 1996. He also wrote occasional unpaid columns for Tribune, under the title "Rattling the Bars", and continued to write until the age of 87.

== Political views ==
Politically Aitken was a Labour Party supporter who was in the 'traditional' left-of-centre (sometimes called 'classic labour'). He was against the Labour Left and New Labour alike, accusing the latter of having "hijacked" the party. He was opposed to the Iraq War.

== Personal life ==
Aitken lived the majority of his life in Highgate, North London. In 1956, he married Catherine Hay Mackie, a doctor. She was the younger sister of John Mackie, Baron John-Mackie and George Mackie, Baron Mackie of Benshie. Aitken and his wife had two daughters and were married until her death, from Alzheimer's disease, in 2006.

In 1966, Aitken underwent an operation to have an eye removed, due to a tumour.

Aitken died from a chest infection at the Hospital of St John and St Elizabeth in London on 21 February 2018, at the age of 90. Among those paying tribute to Aitken's life was the broadcaster Iain Dale. His ashes were placed in the grave of his wife Catherine on the eastern side of Highgate Cemetery.

Media offices
Preceded by Francis Boyd	Political Editor of The Guardian; 1975–1990	Succeeded by Michael White
