= Sam White (political adviser) =

British political adviser

Chief of Staff to the Leader of the Opposition
- In office September 2021 – October 2022
- Leader: Keir Starmer
- Preceded by: Morgan McSweeney
- Succeeded by: Sue Gray (2023)

Personal details
- Born: September 1974 (age 51)
- Spouse: Katie White
- Parent: Michael White (father)
- Occupation: Political adviser

Sam White (born 1975 or 1976) is a British political adviser. He was Chief of Staff to Leader of the Opposition Keir Starmer from September 2021 to November 2022.

== Early life ==
White was born in 1975 or 1976. His father is Michael White.

== Politics ==
White worked for Alistair Darling from 2004 to 2010, including as a special adviser in HM Treasury. He also worked at the Government trade department and transport department.

White became a Strategic Adviser to Keir Starmer, supporting his transition to Leader of the Opposition in 2020 and running his response to the COVID-19 pandemic from April to August 2020. He was appointed Chief of Staff to Starmer in July 2021, taking up the role in September. White's appointment came after the loss of the Hartlepool by-election, a "botched" reshuffle, and sagging poll numbers. The appointment was praised by Conservative Party adviser James Dowling, who had worked with White at the Treasury. White's style was described as hands-on. While in the role, White was documented as clashing with Shadow Cabinet member Lisa Nandy over her attending a picket line in August 2022. White was sacked from the role in October 2022.
