= Michael White (journalist) =

British journalist (born 1945)

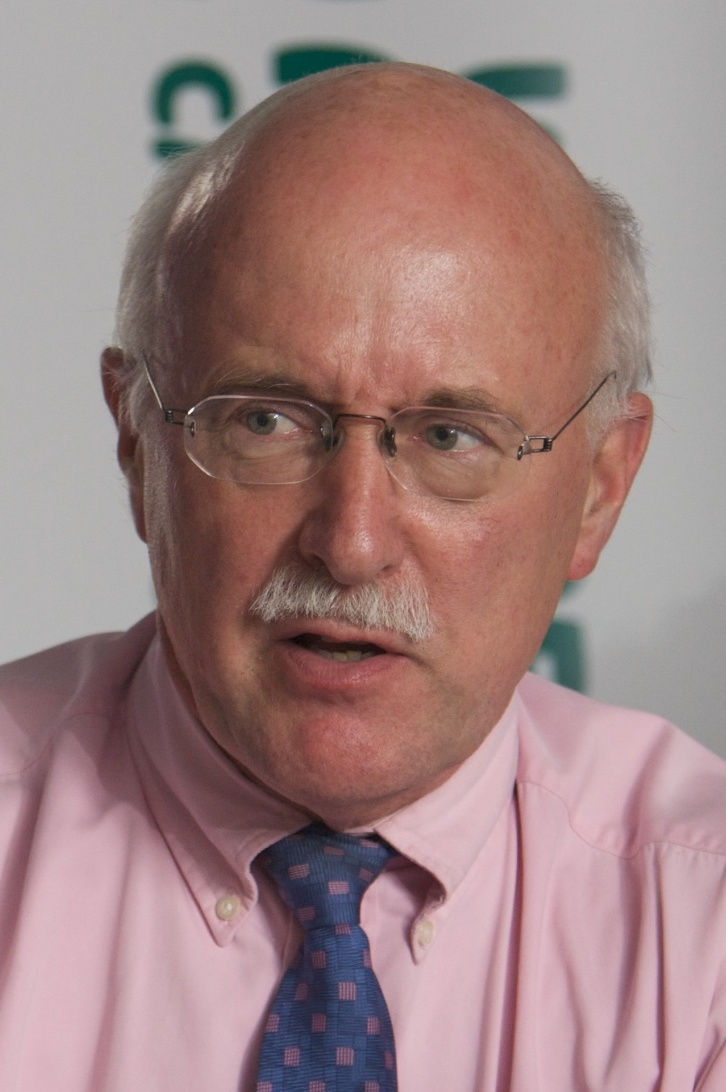
- White chairing a session for the Health Hotel in September 2009
- Born: 21 October 1945 (age 80)
- Education: University College London (BA)
- Occupation: Journalist
- Children: Sam White

Michael White (born 21 October 1945) is a British journalist who was until 2016 an associate editor of The Guardian. He is the paper's former political editor.

== Early life and education ==
White was raised in Wadebridge, Cornwall. He was educated at Bodmin Grammar School and then studied for a BA in history at University College London.

His son is the political adviser Sam White.

== Career ==
White began his career in journalism at the Reading Evening Post (1966–71) and after a spell at London's Evening Standard (1970–71) he moved to The Guardian, where he worked as a sub/feature writer (1971–74), diary writer (1974–76), political correspondent and sketchwriter (1976–84) and Washington correspondent from 1984. He became the newspaper's political editor in 1990, succeeding Ian Aitken; he relinquished the position to Patrick Wintour at the beginning of 2006. He retired from his Guardian positions in October 2016. In 2003, he was voted Print Journalist of the Year by MPs and Peers in The House/BBC Parliamentary Awards.

He is a regular commentator on the BBC, introducing newspaper reviews and commenting on everything from Newsnight to Breakfast News, BBC News Channel and Question Time. He has also appeared on BBC Radio 4, introducing a programme on political insults, Savaged by a Dead Sheep.

White retired from The Guardian in October 2016 after almost 45 years at the paper. He wrote a regular column for the Health Service Journal from 1977 to 2017.

== Political views ==
Despite being a Labour Party supporter, White has not always had the easiest of relationships with Labour and its leading figures. In November 1991, following the death of Mirror owner Robert Maxwell, he was involved in a physical altercation with the title's political editor Alastair Campbell, later Director of Communications for Tony Blair, over White's use of the "Cap'n Bob, Bob, Bob" refrain.

In February 2006, White detailed the changing attitudes of the Labour Party to The Guardian. He wrote that the Blair government changed its attitude to The Guardian, from hostility towards grudging friendship as the government lost "fair weather friends" on other papers. "It is no secret in the office, for example, that I think its coverage of the protracted crisis over Iraq since 2003, has not always been fair to Blair's position", he wrote. Regarding the Israel–Palestine conflict, in July 2006 he wrote that over time his sympathies are shifting back to Israel "however short-sighted and self-defeating some of its actions are".

White, in discussing media self-censorship in March 2011, said, "I have always sensed liberal, middle class ill-ease in going after stories about immigration, legal or otherwise, about welfare fraud or the less attractive tribal habits of the working class, which is more easily ignored altogether. Toffs, including royal ones, Christians, especially popes, governments of Israel, and US Republicans are more straightforward targets."

White has argued against some gay rights, including gay adoption and same-sex marriage.

Media offices
Preceded by Ian Aitken	Political Editor of The Guardian; 1990–2006	Succeeded by Patrick Wintour
