= David Austick =

British Liberal MP

Member of Parliament for Ripon
- In office 26 July 1973 – 8 February 1974
- Preceded by: Malcolm Stoddart-Scott
- Succeeded by: Keith Hampson

Personal details
- Born: 8 March 1920
- Died: 9 February 1997 (aged 76)
- Party: Liberal

David Austick (8 March 1920 – 9 February 1997) was a British Liberal Party politician and bookshop owner.

== Political career ==
At a by-election in July 1973 caused by the death of the sitting Conservative MP Sir Malcolm Stoddart-Scott, Austick was elected Member of Parliament (MP) for Ripon in the West Riding of Yorkshire, gaining the seat from the Conservatives by a majority of 946 votes. However, it was a short-lived success. In the February 1974 general election, Austick lost by 4,335 votes to the new Conservative candidate Keith Hampson after seven months as an MP.

Austick was never again elected an MP, but he also served as a district and county councillor in Yorkshire and was one time Chairman of the Liberal Candidates' Association. He later became Executive Chairman of the Electoral Reform Society.

== See also ==
- List of United Kingdom MPs with the shortest service

Parliament of the United Kingdom
Preceded by Sir Malcolm Stoddart-Scott	Member of Parliament for Ripon; 1973–February 1974	Succeeded by Keith Hampson
