= Political Animals (rugby) =

Political Animals are a rugby league club founded in 2010 by MP for Leeds North West, Greg Mulholland. It is intended to be made up of "parliamentarians, councillors and political staff from all political parties". The team will play their home games at Headingley Stadium. Greg Mulholland is the vice-chair of the All Party Parliamentary Rugby League Group and believes that the team can make the issues of sport more prominent in Parliament, stating on his website: "The Political Animals will bring more and more politicians and MP's into the game making them aware of the enjoyment gained from playing the sport".

== Membership ==
Mike Stephenson is the club's president. Greg Mulholland MP, Lord Dominic Addington, and Andy Reed have also stated they will play for the club. The club will be sponsored by The Co-operative brand.

Currently, the following notable players have made an appearance:

1. Greg Mulholland
2. Dominic Addington
3. Andy Reed
4. Ikram Butt
5. Ady Spencer
6. Martin Winter (former mayor of Doncaster)
7. Ryk Downes, Deputy Leader of Leeds Liberal Democrats and Former Chairman of Metro (West Yorkshire Integrated Transport Authority)
