= Harold Best =

British politician (1937–2020)

- Best as an MP

Member of Parliament for Leeds North West
- In office 1 May 1997 – 11 April 2005
- Preceded by: Keith Hampson
- Succeeded by: Greg Mulholland

Personal details
- Born: 18 December 1937 Leeds, England
- Died: 24 August 2020 (aged 82) North Yorkshire, England
- Party: Labour
- Spouse: Glyn (m. 1960)
- Children: 4
- Education: Meanwood County School; Leeds College of Technology
- Occupation: Electrician; politician; trade unionist

Harold Best (18 December 1937 – 24 August 2020) was a British Labour politician, electrician and trade unionist who served as Member of Parliament (MP) for Leeds North West from the 1997 general election until he retired at the 2005 election.

== Early life ==
During his childhood, Best lived in Leeds, where he was born on 18 December 1937 to Fred and Marie Best. He was educated at Meanwood County School and Leeds College of Technology and worked as an electrical technician.

== Career ==
Best was selected as the candidate for Leeds North West, winning the seat unexpectedly in the 1997 general election and becoming the Labour Party's first holder of the seat since its formation. He began with a majority of 3,844 over his predecessor, Keith Hampson, and increased his majority in the 2001 general election to 5,236. He began as a supporter of his leader, Tony Blair, before vocally opposing the Iraq War.

Best was involved in the opening of the new Wharfedale Hospital in Otley in 2004. He announced he would not contest the 2005 general election.

== Personal life ==
Best died in North Yorkshire on 24 August 2020, at the age of 82, and was survived by his wife since 1960, Glyn, and their two sons and two daughters.

Parliament of the United Kingdom
Preceded by Keith Hampson	Member of Parliament for Leeds North West; 1997–2005	Succeeded by Greg Mulholland
