= Malcolm Stoddart-Scott =

British politician (1901–1973)

Colonel Sir Malcolm Stoddart-Scott OBE MC TD (23 September 1901 – 15 June 1973) was a Conservative Party politician in the United Kingdom.

== Background ==
He attended Elmfield College and was then a master there. He qualified as a doctor from the University of Leeds and was commissioned Lieutenant in the Territorial Army Royal Army Medical Corps in 1927, eventually reaching the rank of colonel.

== Career ==
Stoddart-Scott chaired the British Rheumatism Association and also served as chairman of the British group of the Inter-Parliamentary Union from 1951 to 1959, in addition to being a member of the Church Assembly. Farmer and director of family wool business, B Parkinson & Co. He was knighted in 1957.

He was Member of Parliament (MP) for Pudsey and Otley from 1945 to 1950, and after that constituency was abolished in boundary changes for the 1950 general election, he was MP for Ripon from 1950 until his death in 1973. Before his death, he had announced his intention to stand down at the next election. The by-election following his death was won by the Liberal Party candidate, David Austick.

== Personal life and death ==
In 1940, Stoddart-Scott married Elsie Parkinson, and they had two children. After a brief illness, Stoddard-Scott died in the Wharfedale district of the North Riding of Yorkshire on 15 June 1973, at the age of 71.

Parliament of the United Kingdom
Preceded by Sir Granville Gibson	Member of Parliament for Pudsey and Otley; 1945 – 1950	constituency abolished
Preceded by Christopher York	Member of Parliament for Ripon; 1950 – 1973	Succeeded by David Austick
