= Arthington Priory =

Monastery in Leeds, West Yorkshire, England

Coordinates: 53.9017°N 1.5620°W

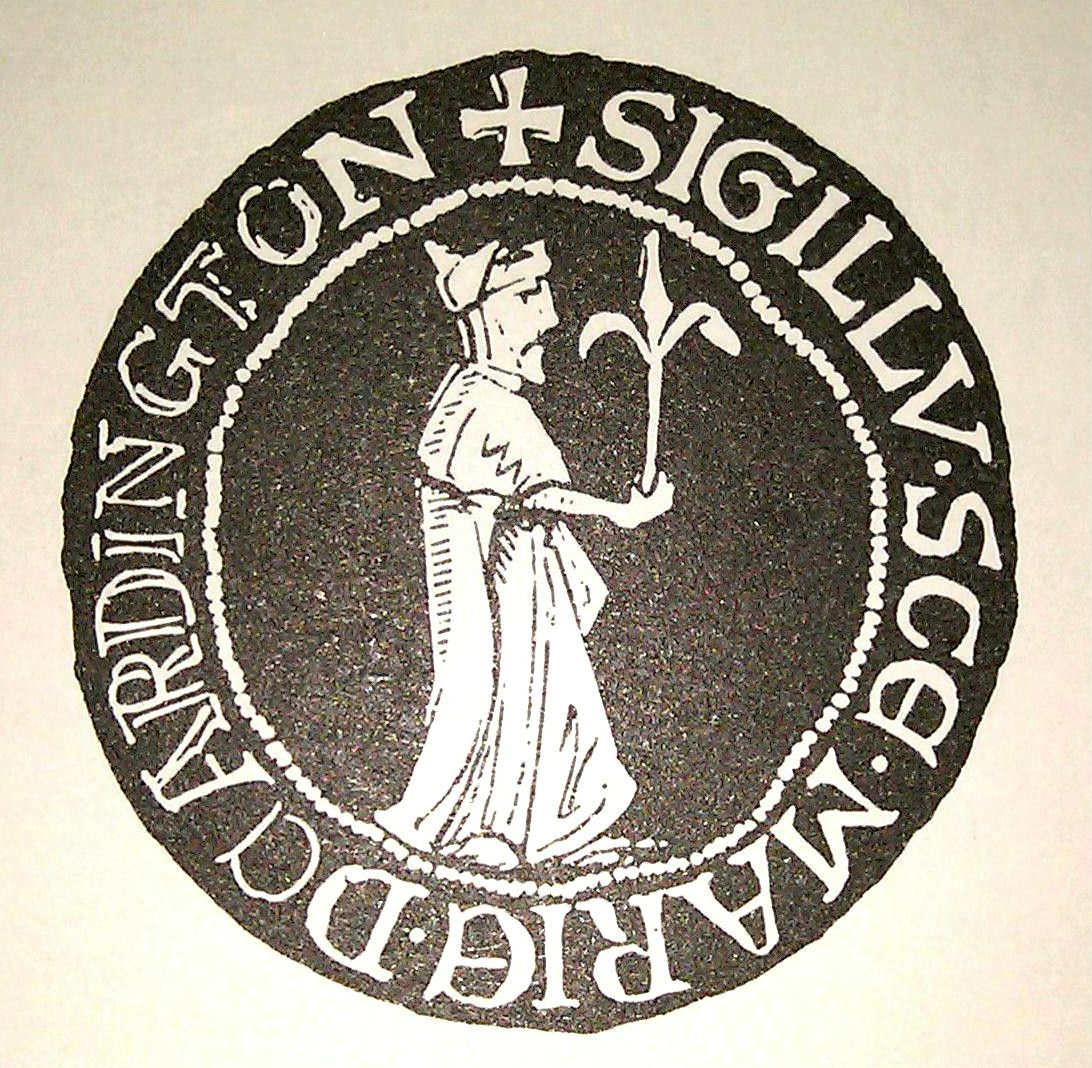
Seal of Arthington Priory

Arthington Priory was an English monastery which was home to a community of nuns in Arthington, West Yorkshire, founded in the mid-12th century. The priory land is occupied by a residence called "Arthington Hall", which was built around 1585, and little, if anything, remains of the priory. The site of the priory church is possibly now occupied by a farmhouse called The Nunnery. The community was the only one of nuns of the Cluniac congregation in Yorkshire and one of two in England. It was established through a grant by Peter de Arthington.

== Foundation ==
Peter de Arthington gave the nuns "the place the whilk the said abby is byggyd on, with all the appurtenaunces". Peter's son Serlo confirmed and added to his father's gift and, in turn, his own son Peter confirmed the earlier gifts and added 1 acre (0.40 ha) "of land in Tebecroft, and also all the watyre that thai may lede to make yam a milne with, and to thair other usez necessarez."

The church at Maltby in South Yorkshire was granted to the priory and formally appropriated to it by the Archbishop of York, Alexander Neville, in 1378. The community received other gifts of land but the priory remained a small house. Other benefactors made donations, on the condition that they and their descendants were to have the right of presenting a girl for admission to the monastery any time there might be a vacancy in the community.

== Priory history ==
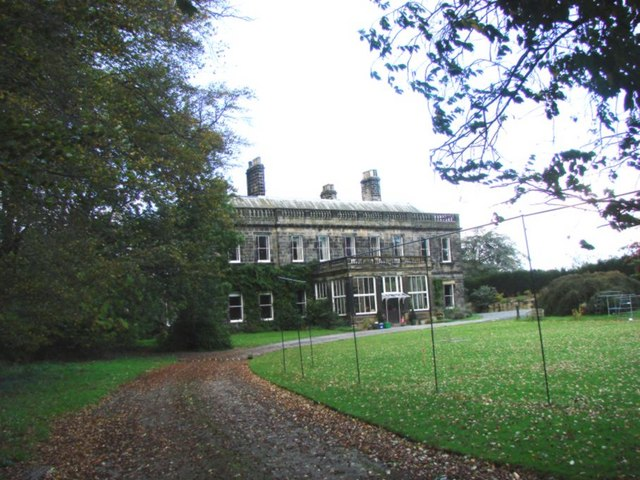
Arthington Hall, built on the priory land, possibly re-using the old front door

The archives show that all was not well at the priory for a good portion of its history; discipline had to be enforced on various nuns and, at one point, on the prioress.

Following a visit on 9 June 1307, William Greenfield, the Archbishop of York, wrote to the prioress concerning four nuns. Dames Dionisia de Heuensdale and Ellen de Castleford were forbidden to leave the precincts of the cloister. Two others, Agnes de Screvyn, who had resigned as prioress four years earlier, and Isabella Couvel, had claimed certain animals and goods belonging to the priory were their private property and the prioress ordered them to resign within three days as punishment.

On 13 March 1311, the sub-prioress and community were ordered to render due obedience to the prioress, Isabella de Berghby. On 30 August, an anonymous letter was sent by a member of the community to Master Walter de Bebiry, Dean of Ainsty, asking him to come to Arthington to inquire as to why Prioress Isabella de Berghby and Dame Margaret de Tang had left the establishment. He was charged with finding with whom they had left and where they were living. He learned that de Berghby had resented having another nun associated with the management of the priory, and, in a fit of pique, had cast off her religious habit and left. She did not formally resign the office and no successor could be elected or appointed until she returned and resigned or was expelled from the community. However, on 19 September 1312, Maud de Batheley was confirmed as prioress but within four days of her appointment, the archbishop wrote to inform her that de Berghby had come to him in the spirit of humility, and he had absolved her and lifted the excommunication she had incurred by leaving the cloister. The archbishop instructed Prioress Maud to receive Isabella back, but that she was to take the last place in the community in the Chapter, in choir for the Divine Office and in the refectory, and she was not to leave the cloister.

On 18 September 1315, Archbishop Greenfield visited Arthington and issued a series of injunctions to the nuns:

An account of all the goods of the house was to be made by all the officers every year before the feast of Saint Andrew, and to be shown to the prioress and three or four of the more discreet nuns. The sick were to be properly tended in the infirmary, as the means of the house allowed. Silence was to be kept as mandated in the Rule of St. Benedict, and all who could were to attend the liturgical services. The archbishop instructed that no woman who was received as a lay sister of the house should be allowed to accept or wear a black veil proper to choir nuns. Moreover, neither the prioress nor the sub-prioress were to allow boys—or indeed any secular persons—to sleep in the dormitory. Also, in future, when the prioress or sub-prioress allowed any of the nuns to visit their parents or friends, a limit of fifteen days was to be allowed. If they did not return on time without a legitimate reason, they were to be punished in Chapter. Additionally, permission to leave the priory was only to be granted only once or twice a year.

The archbishop repeated these directives on a later visit.

== Abbey of Cluny ==
The priory came under the rule of the Abbey of Cluny in Burgundy. The Cluniac congregation was a reform branch of the Benedictines, which was a keystone to the stability that European society achieved in the 11th century. Partly owing to stricter adherence to the Benedictine Rule, Cluny became the acknowledged leader of western monasticism from the later 10th century. Arthington was one of two Cluniac communities of nuns in England, the other being Delapré Abbey at Northampton.

A succession of Abbots of Cluny were statesmen on an international stage. The Abbey of Cluny became the grandest, most prestigious and best endowed monastic institution in Europe. The height of Cluniac influence was from the second half of the 10th century until the early 12th century.

=== The Cluniac Prayer ===
"O God, by whose grace thy servants, the Holy Abbots of Cluny, enkindled with the fire of thy love, became burning and shining lights in thy Church: Grant that we also may be aflame with the spirit of love and discipline, and may ever walk before thee as children of light; through Jesus Christ our Lord, who with thee, in the unity of the Holy Spirit, liveth and reigneth, one God, now and for ever."

== The Dissolution ==
At the time of the Dissolution of the Monasteries under King Henry VIII in 1540 there were nine nuns at the priory, including the prioress, Elizabeth Hall, who was then 45 years of age. In the priory records, Domus monialium Arthyngton clunienc ordinis S[anct]i Benedicti, (The House of Nuns in Arthyington of the Cluniac Order of St. Benedict), against the names of the nuns, except the prioress, is written "continue", meaning that she wished to continue in vows. The records state that "All these persons (including the prioress) be of good religious liffying and not slanderid." The ages of the nuns ranged between 72 and 25 years.

The priory was formally surrendered by Elizabeth Hall on 26 November 1540. The annual value of the priory at this time, according to the Valor Ecclesiasticus, was £11 8s 4d, and at the date of the surrender the demesne lands were valued at £5 8s 4d, while the priory grounds, along with its storehouses, gardens, and orchards were valued at 5 shillings a year.

== After the Dissolution ==
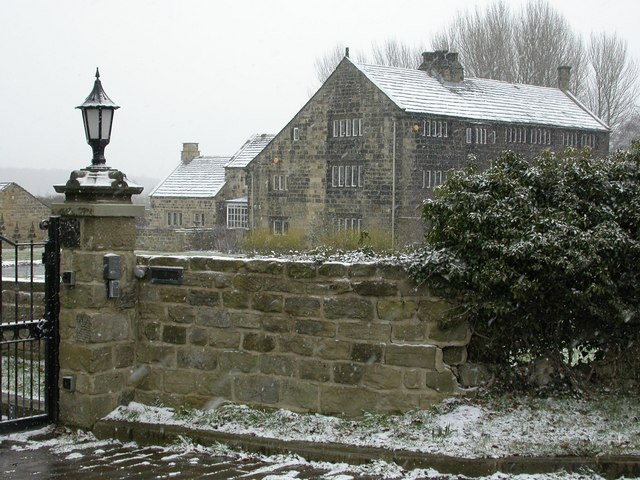
The Nunnery, said to stand on the foundations of the priory church

After suppression of the priory, in 1543 the site was given by the King to Archbishop Thomas Cranmer. In the time of Charles I, a plain but substantial hall was built on the priory land. The front doorway which is dated 1585, has been removed from some older building. In 1822 the hall was occupied as a farm house and was the property of the Earl of Harewood. In the parish records it is described as "a large well-built, square house, on a fine elevation above the river". Despite the loss of the ancient buildings, the 1822 records have an entry that states: "ARTHINGTON NUNNERY, in the parish of Adel, upper-division of Skyrack, and adjoins the village of Arthington". This probably refers to The Nunnery, a farmhouse which is said to stand on the foundations and lower courses of the priory church. Its farm buildings were possibly built over the monastery buildings.

Arthington Hall is an 18th century neo-classical mansion built on part of the former Priory site. After a fire in the late 18th century, it was remodelled by John Carr. In 1842, the hall was sold to the Sheepshanks family of wool merchants, who had it extended by Alfred Waterhouse in 1875. The hall was further extended in 1908 and later used as a convalescent home during World War II. The hall is a Grade II* listed building. As of October 2023, it is on sale with a guide price of £7.5 million.

== The Prioresses ==
The Prioresses were as follows:

- Sara – 1241
- Eleanor – 1299
- Maud de Kesewik – died 1299
- Agnes de Skrevin – 1299–1302 (resigned)
- Agnes de Pontefract – 1302
- Isabella de Berghby – 1311 (demoted after leaving the priory without permission)
- Maud de Batheley – 1312
- Isabella Dautry – died 1349
- Isabella de Berughby – 1349
- Isabel de Eccope – between 1413–20
- Sibil Plesyngton – 1437
- Alice Raucestre – died 1463
- Marjorie Craven – 1463
- Katherine Willesthorp – 1475 (died 1484)
- Alice Mawde – 1484 (died 149)
- Elizabeth Popeley – 1492 (deprived 1494)
- Margaret Turton – 1494 (died 1496)
- Alice Hall – 1496
- Elizabeth Hall – 1532 – Priory surrendered 1540

1543: property given to Thomas Cranmer.
