= Arthington =

Village and civil parish in Leeds, West Yorkshire, England

Coordinates: 53.90°N 1.58°W

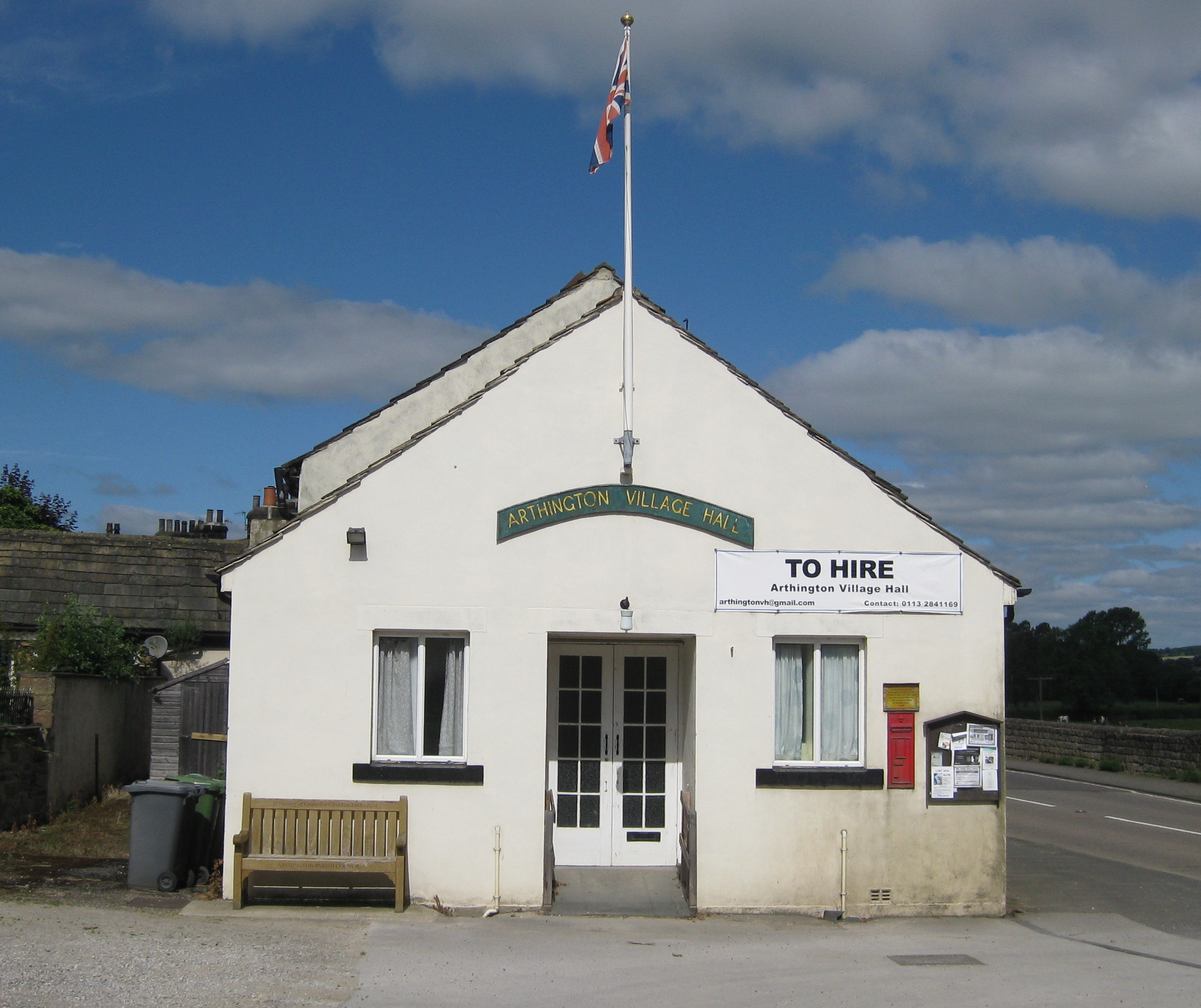
- Arthington Village Hall

- Location within West Yorkshire
- Population: 532 (2011 Census)
- OS grid reference: SE273447
- Civil parish: Arthington
- Metropolitan borough: City of Leeds
- Metropolitan county: West Yorkshire
- Region: Yorkshire and the Humber
- Country: England
- Sovereign state: United Kingdom
- Post town: OTLEY
- Postcode district: LS21
- Dialling code: 0113
- Police: West Yorkshire
- Fire: West Yorkshire
- Ambulance: Yorkshire
- UK Parliament: Leeds North West

Arthington is a linear village in Wharfedale, in the City of Leeds metropolitan borough in West Yorkshire, England. It is a civil parish which, according to the 2011 census, had a population of 532. It is in the Adel and Wharfedale ward of the City of Leeds, and the Leeds North West parliamentary constituency.

== Geography ==
The village is a small collection of dwellings and farms along the A659 road (Arthington Lane) running from Pool-in-Wharfedale in the West to Harewood in the East, and south of a section of the River Wharfe. Up Black Hill Road to the south is a working stone quarry.

== Etymology ==
The name Arthington is first attested in the Domesday Book as Hardinctone, Ardintona and Ardinton. The first element of the name comes from the Old English personal name Eard, a nickname form of longer names like Eardwulf; the connecting element -ing-, used to indicate Eard's association with the place; and the word tūn ('farmstead, estate'). Thus the name meant 'Eard's estate'. Spellings with th for d appear from the twelfth century onwards and are thought to show the influence of Old Norse pronunciation on the name.

== History ==
Arthington was part of the estate of Aluuard of Northumbria, along with Adel, Burdon, Cookridge and Eccup, up until the Norman Conquest of England. It was then given to the Count of Mortain (half brother of William the Conqueror). However, it had greatly reduced in value during the Conquest, falling from 30 shillings to 5, and much of the area was described as waste.

It was in the 12th century that Arthington (or Ardington) as a family name was established, as vassals to the tenant in chief, the Paynel and later the Luterel family. Peter de Arthington donated lands at Arthington to Kirkstall Abbey which led to the establishment of a nunnery known as Arthington Priory. The site is now believed to be occupied by Nunnery Farm, with the main house dated 1585 built from the ruins. By this time the region had improved with more land under agriculture and more inhabitants.

== Buildings ==
The village mainly extends from the Wharfedale pub at the western end to the former parish church of St Peter on the eastern end. This dates from 1864 and is a Grade II listed building like many others in the village. It became redundant because of the small congregation, and in 2007 it was renamed St Mary and St Abanoub as a Coptic Orthodox church. It serves a congregation living in West, North and East Yorkshire.

Arthington Hall was the home of the Arthington family from Norman times till the 18th century when it was taken over by the Sheepshank family who rebuilt in Italianate style and also paid for the church. It has been used for filming the UK TV series Heartbeat. To the west of the village is Creskeld Hall, a former Manor house, which has been used for filming the external shots of Home Farm in the TV serial Emmerdale.

The village was the site of Arthington Priory, one of only two Cluniac nunneries in England - the other being at Delapré Abbey in Northampton. The site is now believed to be occupied by Nunnery Farm, with the main house dated 1585 built from the ruins.

== Railway ==
There used to be a railway junction (see Arthington railway station), where the (now-closed) line to Pool-in-Wharfedale station, Otley station, Ilkley station, and on to Skipton station joined the still open Harrogate Line from Leeds to Harrogate station. Arthington station closed completely in 1965 but there is a campaign to re-open the station and the former Otley line.

The village is at the northern end of the Bramhope Tunnel. The railway then crosses the dramatic stone Arthington Viaduct over the River Wharfe to Castley on the north side of the valley. The Arthington Show is actually held on grounds in Castley.

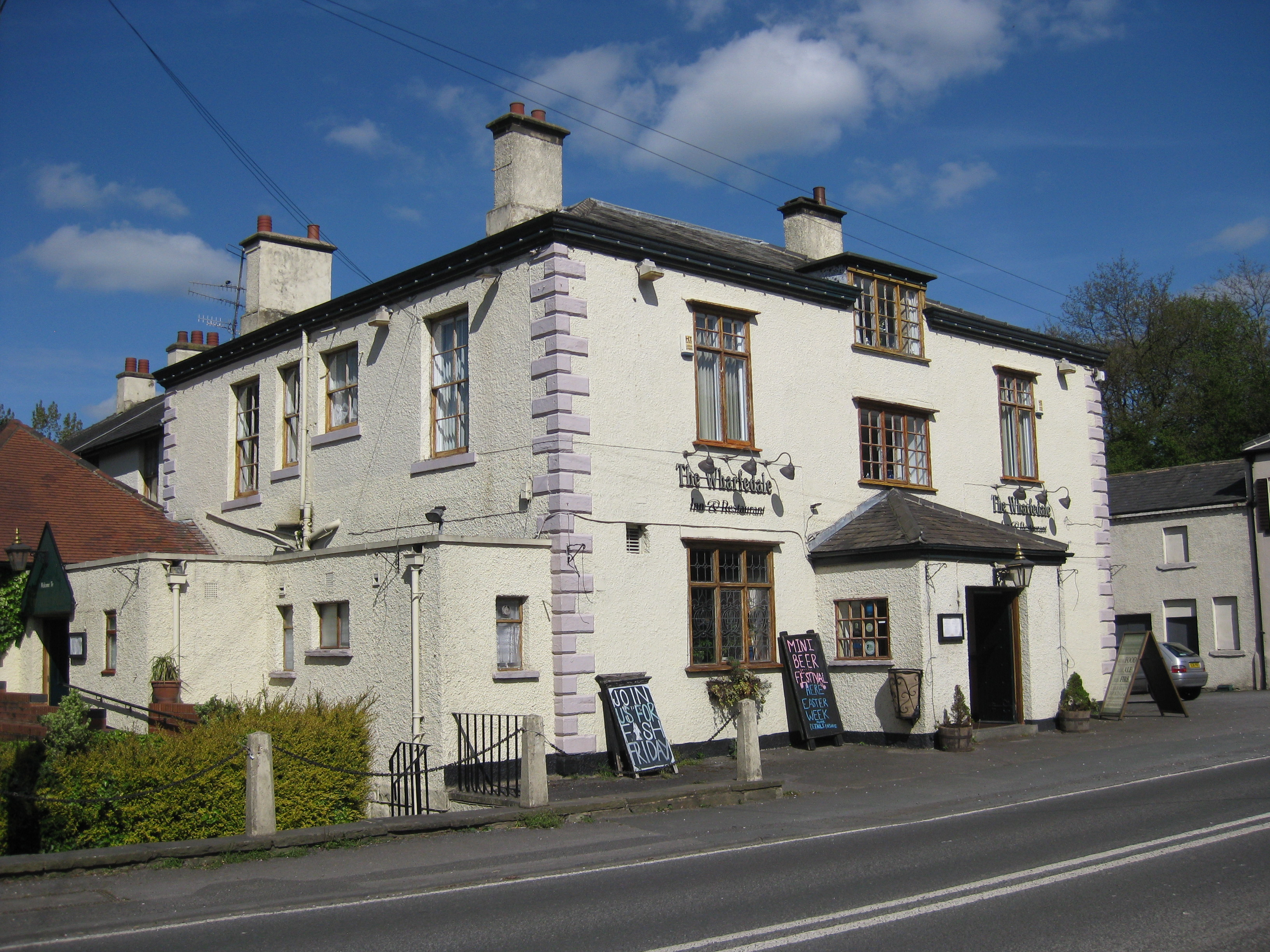
The Wharfedale

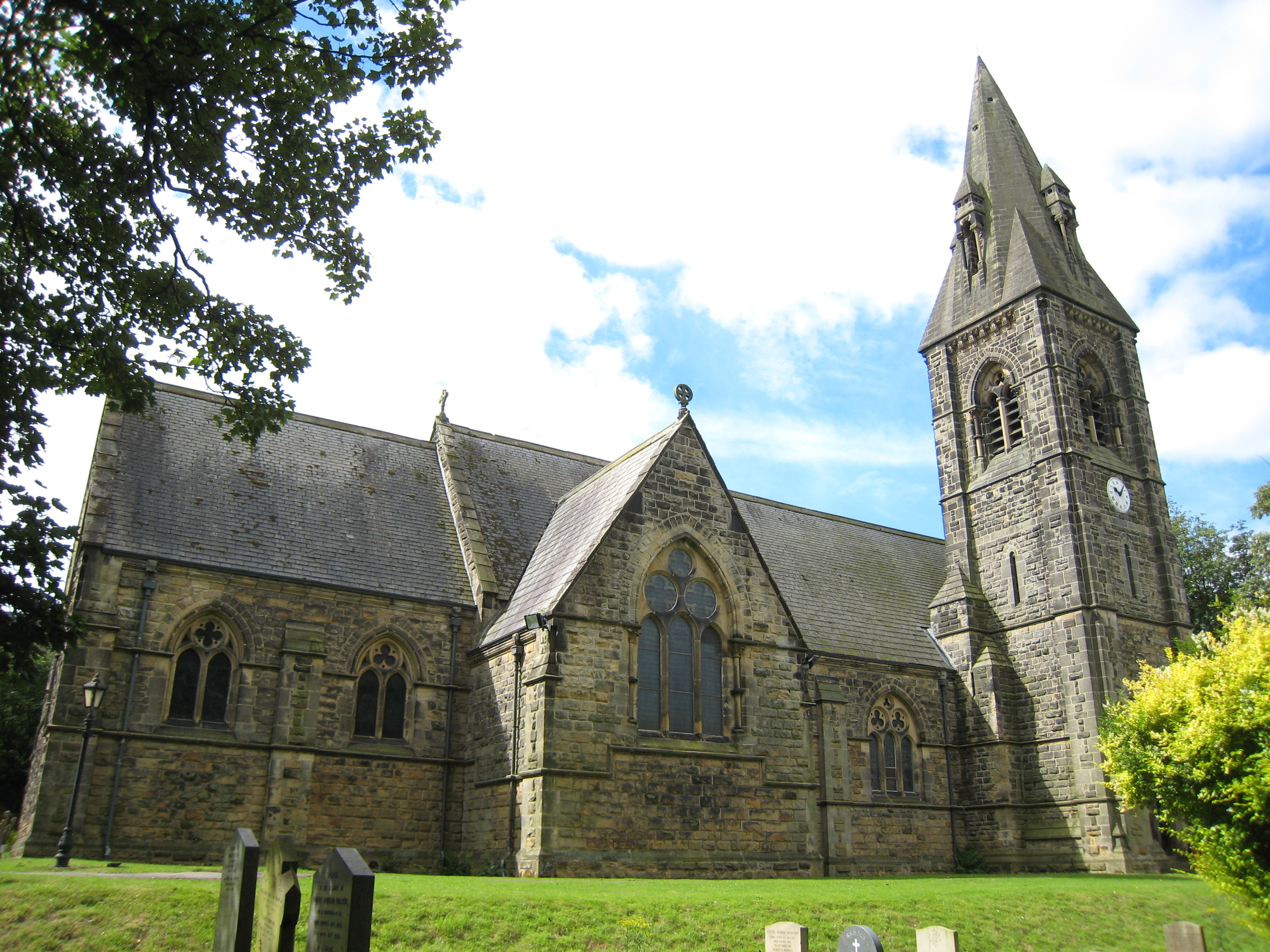
The church

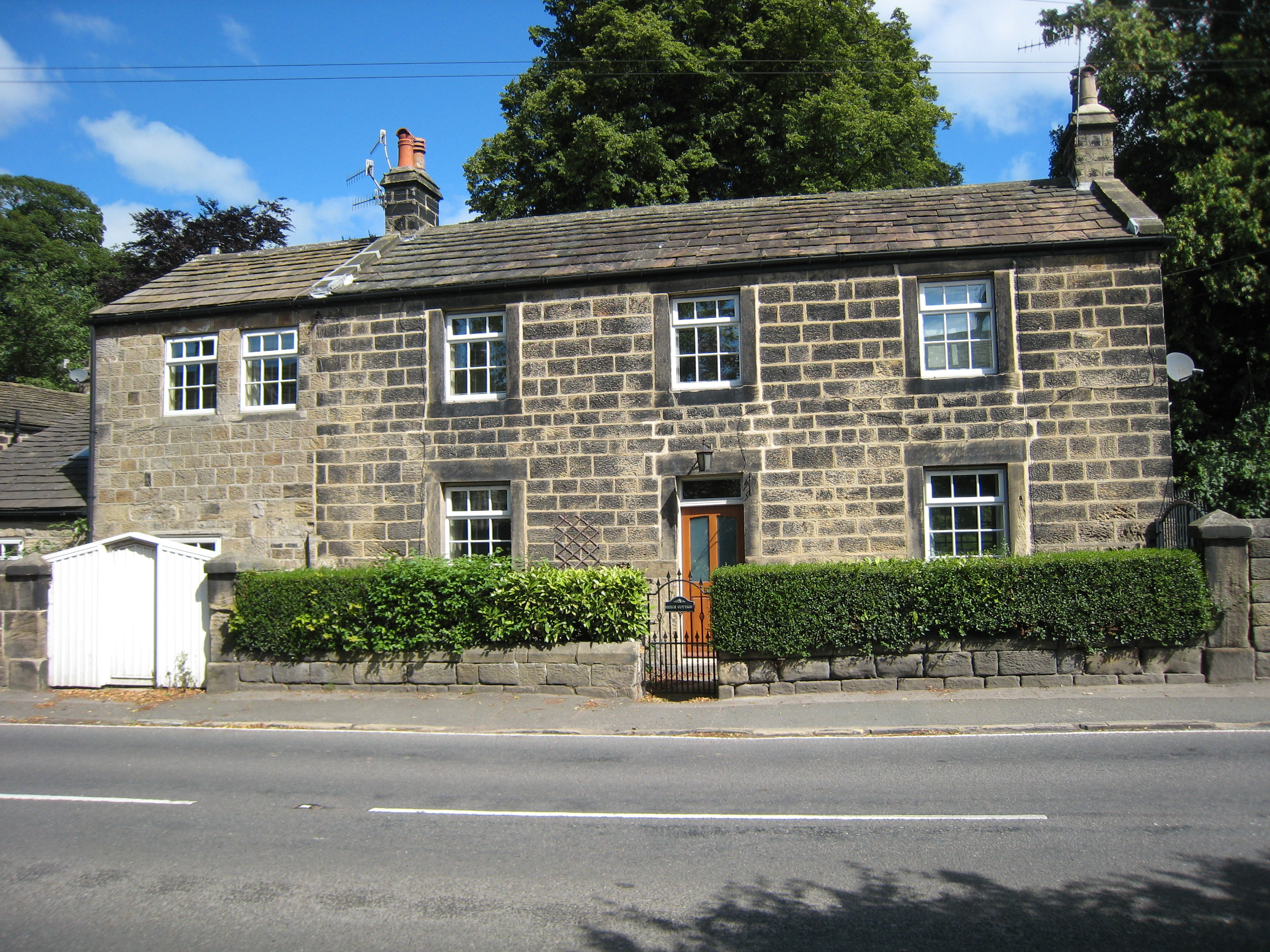
Cottages

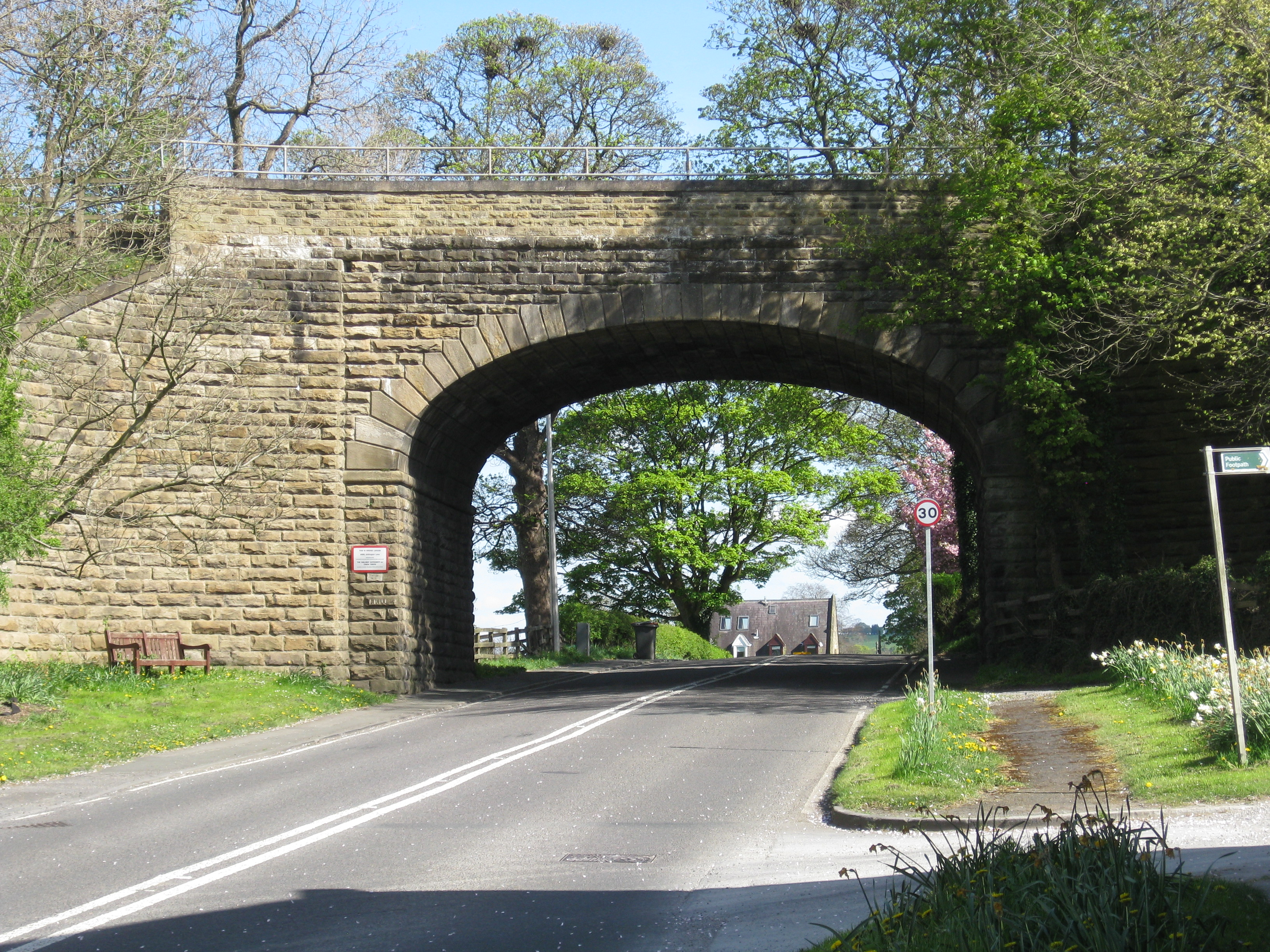
Railway bridge

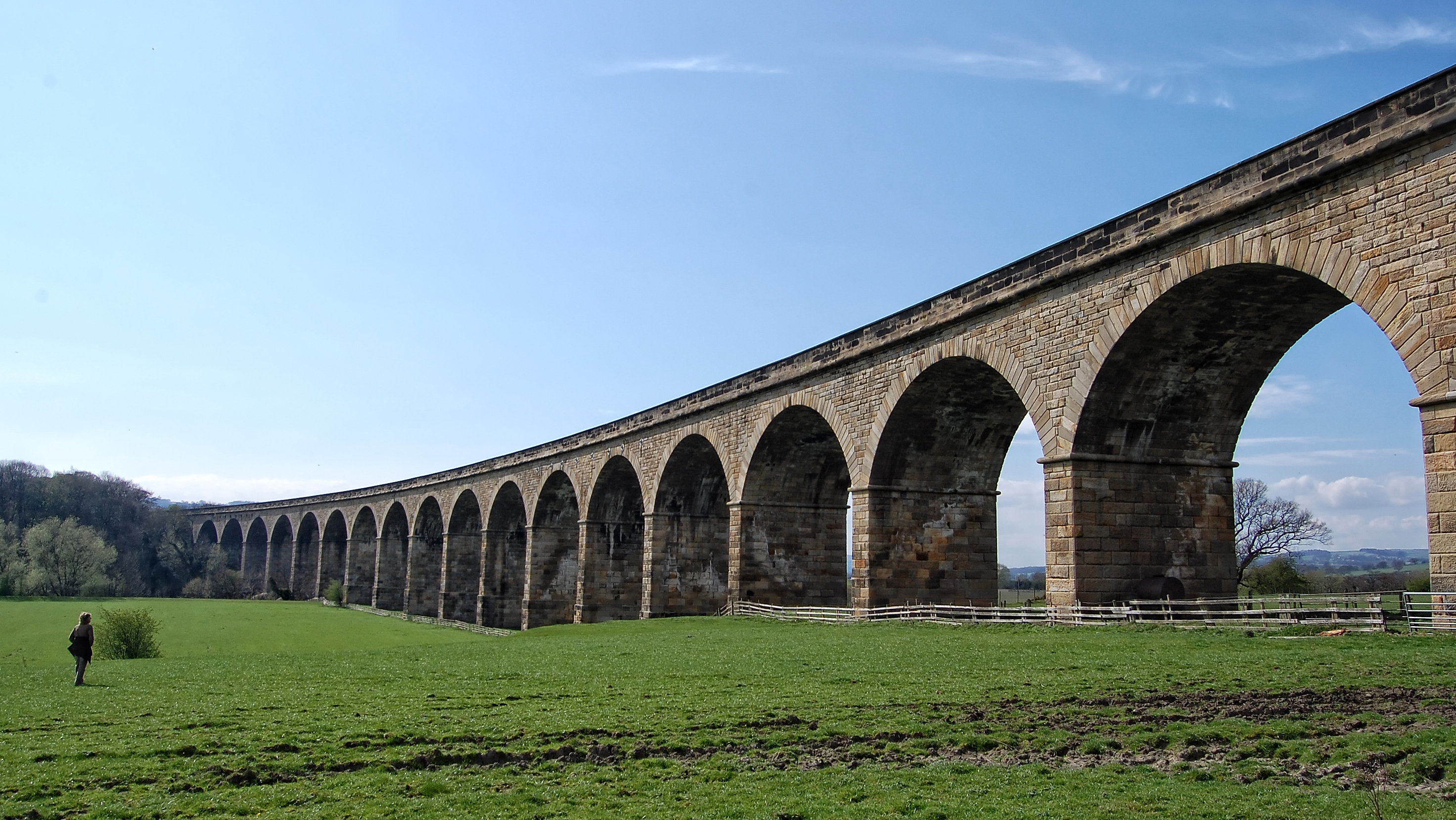
Arthington Viaduct

== See also ==
- Listed buildings in Arthington
