= Arthington railway station =

Disused railway station in West Yorkshire, England

Arthington
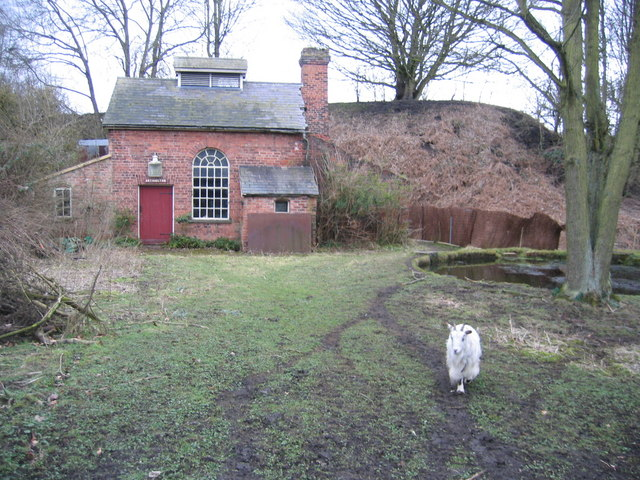
- Gas Works at Arthington railway station in 2008

General information
- Location: Arthington, City of Leeds; England
- Coordinates: 53.8950°N 1.6099°W
- Grid reference: SE257443
- Platforms: 4

Other information
- Status: Disused

History
- Original company: Leeds and Thirsk Railway
- Pre-grouping: North Eastern Railway
- Post-grouping: London and North Eastern Railway

Key dates
- 10 April 1849: Station opens as Pool
- February 1852: Station renamed Arthington
- 1 February 1865: Station moved 605m south
- 22 March 1965: Station closes
Location

Arthington railway station served the village of Arthington in the English county of West Yorkshire, near the North Yorkshire town of Harrogate.

== History ==
Opened by the Leeds Northern Railway, as part of the North Eastern Railway it was absorbed into the London and North Eastern Railway during the Grouping of 1923. The line then passed on to the Eastern Region of British Railways on nationalisation in 1948, closing under that management.

== The site today ==
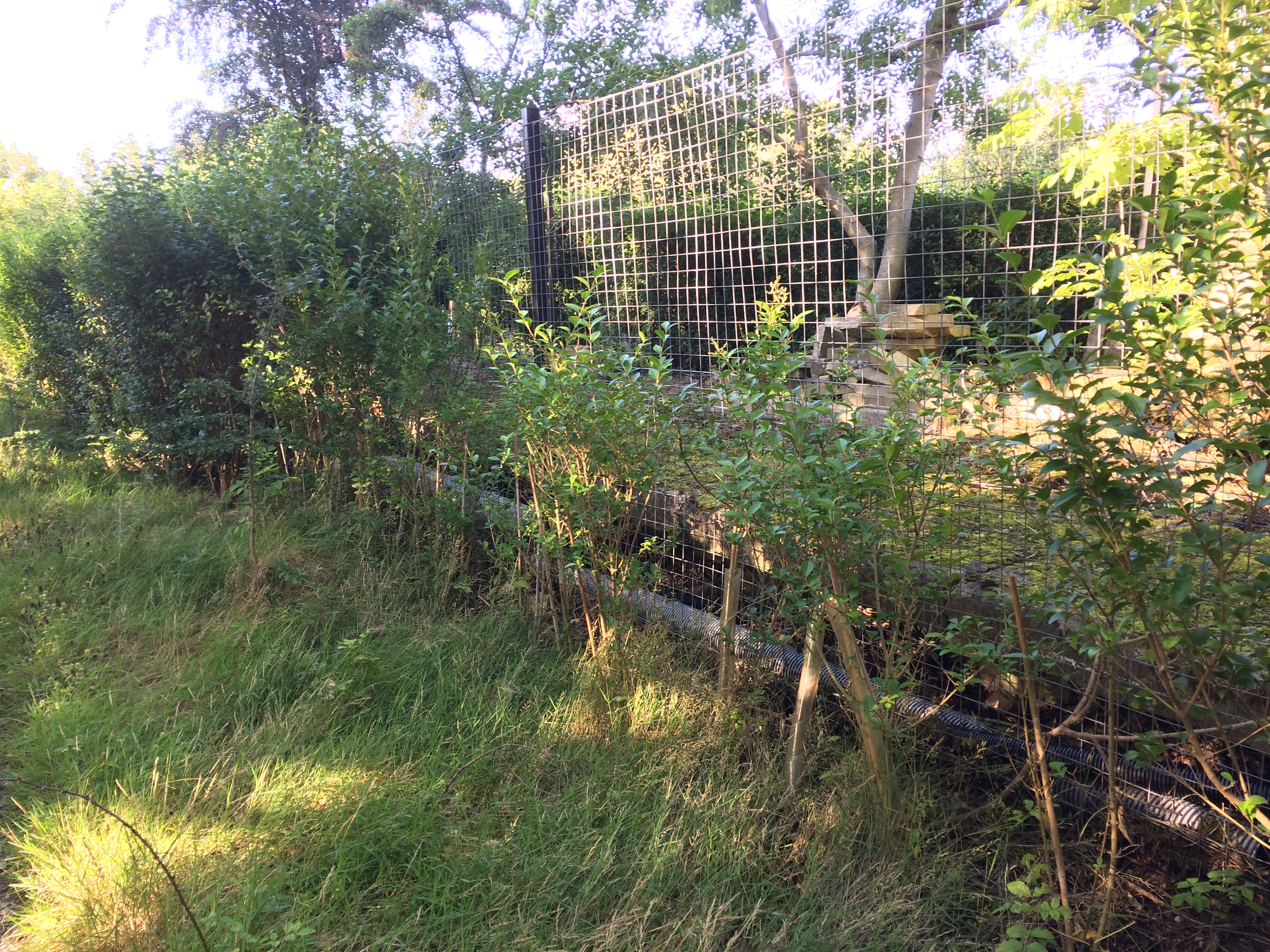
A disused platform edge on the south curve

There have been two stations at Arthington. The original, which opened in 1849, was sited south of the main road (Arthington Lane) near to the Wharfedale Inn. The second station was built to serve the Otley branch which opened in 1865, superseding the first station. The former station is now a private residence. The two sides of the railway triangle that lay to the north of the station have been dismantled (closed 22 March 1965). Trains still pass the eastern part of the triangle on the Harrogate Line.

== Proposed station ==
A station has been proposed to re-open on this site to alleviate road traffic into Leeds along the parallel A roads. West Yorkshire Combined Authority declined to push forward with the plans for Arthington Parkway (as it is named in a 2014 Feasibility study). Reasons cited are the severity of the gradient at the site, insufficient car parking space and lack of suitable road infrastructure for a Park and Ride facility. Local campaigners refute these claims citing that there was a station on the site before and that the report wrongly places the station on the old trackbed of the now closed Otley railway line.

Preceding station	Disused railways	Following station
Horsforth	North Eastern Railway; Leeds Northern Railway	Weeton
Horsforth	North Eastern Railway; Leeds and Thirsk Railway	Pool-in-Wharfedale

== Sources ==
- Butt, R. V. J. (October 1995). The Directory of Railway Stations: details every public and private passenger station, halt, platform and stopping place, past and present (1st ed.). Sparkford: Patrick Stephens Ltd. ISBN 978-1-85260-508-7. OCLC 60251199. OL 11956311M.
- Jowett, Alan (2000). Jowett's Nationalised Railway Atlas (1st ed.). Penryn, Cornwall: Atlantic Transport Publishers. ISBN 978-0-906899-99-1. OCLC 228266687.
