= Keith Hampson =

British politician

Keith Hampson (born 14 August 1943) is a former Conservative party politician in the United Kingdom.

Hampson was educated at King James I Grammar School, Bishop Auckland, where he was head boy, the University of Bristol and Harvard and was a university lecturer by profession. He was a personal assistant to Edward Heath in the 1966 general election.

He was elected the MP for Ripon in February 1974, a seat that the Liberals had gained in a by-election the previous year. The constituency was abolished for the 1983 general election, and Hampson was then elected for Leeds North West. Hampson was PPS to Michael Heseltine, then Defence Secretary, when he was involved in a May 1984 incident in a gay theatre club in Soho where Hampson "accidentally brushed" the thigh of an undercover police officer. Although the court case against him at Southwark Crown Court was dropped, Hampson was forced to resign as PPS. In 1990, with Michael Mates, Hampson ran Heseltine's Conservative Party leadership campaign. At the 1997 general election he was defeated by Labour candidate Harold Best.

Hampson married former fashion model Frances Pauline Einhorn in May 1975, but she was killed whilst passenger in a car accident on 11 September that year aged 29. The driver was twice over the drunk drive limit. Hampson married Susan Cameron in August 1979.

== Bibliography ==
- Times Guide to the House of Commons, February 1974 and 1997 editions.
- Guardian information on Hampson

Parliament of the United Kingdom
Preceded by David Austick	Member of Parliament for Ripon; Feb 1974–1983	Constituency abolished
Preceded by Sir Donald Kaberry	Member of Parliament for Leeds North West; 1983–1997	Succeeded by Harold Best
