= Greg Mulholland =

British Liberal Democrat politician (born 1970)

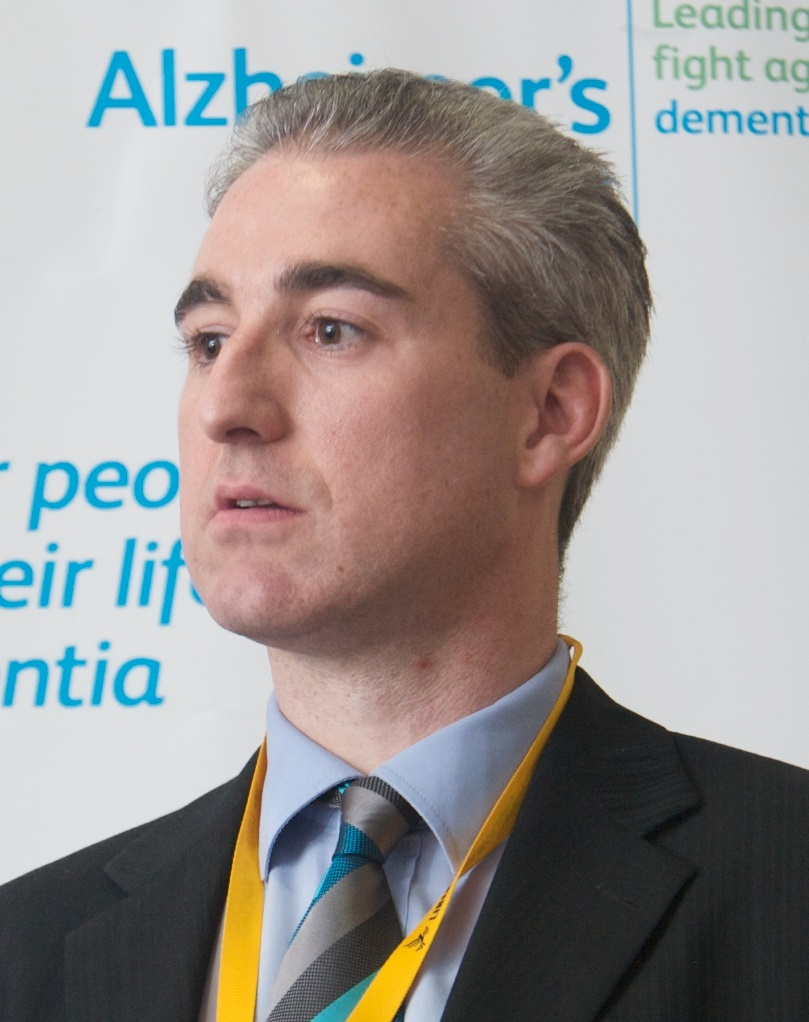
- Mulholland in 2009

Liberal Democrat Campaigns and Communications Chair
- In office 29 July 2015 – 8 June 2017
- Leader: Tim Farron
- Preceded by: Paddy Ashdown (Election Committee Chair)
- Succeeded by: Ed Davey

Member of Parliament for Leeds North West
- In office 5 May 2005 – 3 May 2017
- Preceded by: Harold Best
- Succeeded by: Alex Sobel

Leeds City Councillor for Headingley Ward
- In office 2003–2005
- Preceded by: David Pratt
- Succeeded by: James Monaghan

Personal details
- Born: Gregory Thomas Mulholland; 31 August 1970 (age 56) Manchester, Lancashire, England
- Party: Liberal Democrats
- Spouse: Raegan
- Children: 3
- Education: University of York

Gregory Thomas Mulholland (born 31 August 1970) is a British Liberal Democrat politician who was the MP for Leeds North West.

He was first elected at the 2005 general election, winning the seat from Labour and was re-elected with an increased majority at the 2010 general election, and with a reduced majority at the 2015 general election. Before his parliamentary career, he served as a councillor for Headingley. He served as a Liberal Democrat spokesman for Health, Schools and International Development.

At the 2017 general election he lost his seat to Alex Sobel of the Labour Party.

== Early life ==
Born in Manchester, Mulholland attended St. Ambrose College near Altrincham and studied politics at the University of York, going on to achieve an MA in Public Administration and Public Policy. While at York University, he played at centre for the university rugby league team in matches against Bradford, Leeds, Manchester and Hull. He then worked in marketing for five years, including two years spent in Edinburgh, working on several national promotional campaigns.

His first experience in politics was canvassing in the Knowsley North by-election in 1986, while studying politics for A-level.

He had a long-standing interest and involvement in international development, trade justice and debt campaigns. He was an active member of the campaigning groups Trade Injustice and Debt Action Leeds (TIDAL) and Catholic Aid For Overseas Development (CAFOD).

== Councillor ==
In 2003, he was elected as a Leeds City Councillor for Headingley ward. From 2004 to 2005 he was the lead member for corporate services, until his election to Parliament in 2005. He was also the Liberal Democrat group's spokesperson on the Leeds Supertram, approval for which was turned down in 2006.

== Member of Parliament ==
=== Constituency and party ===
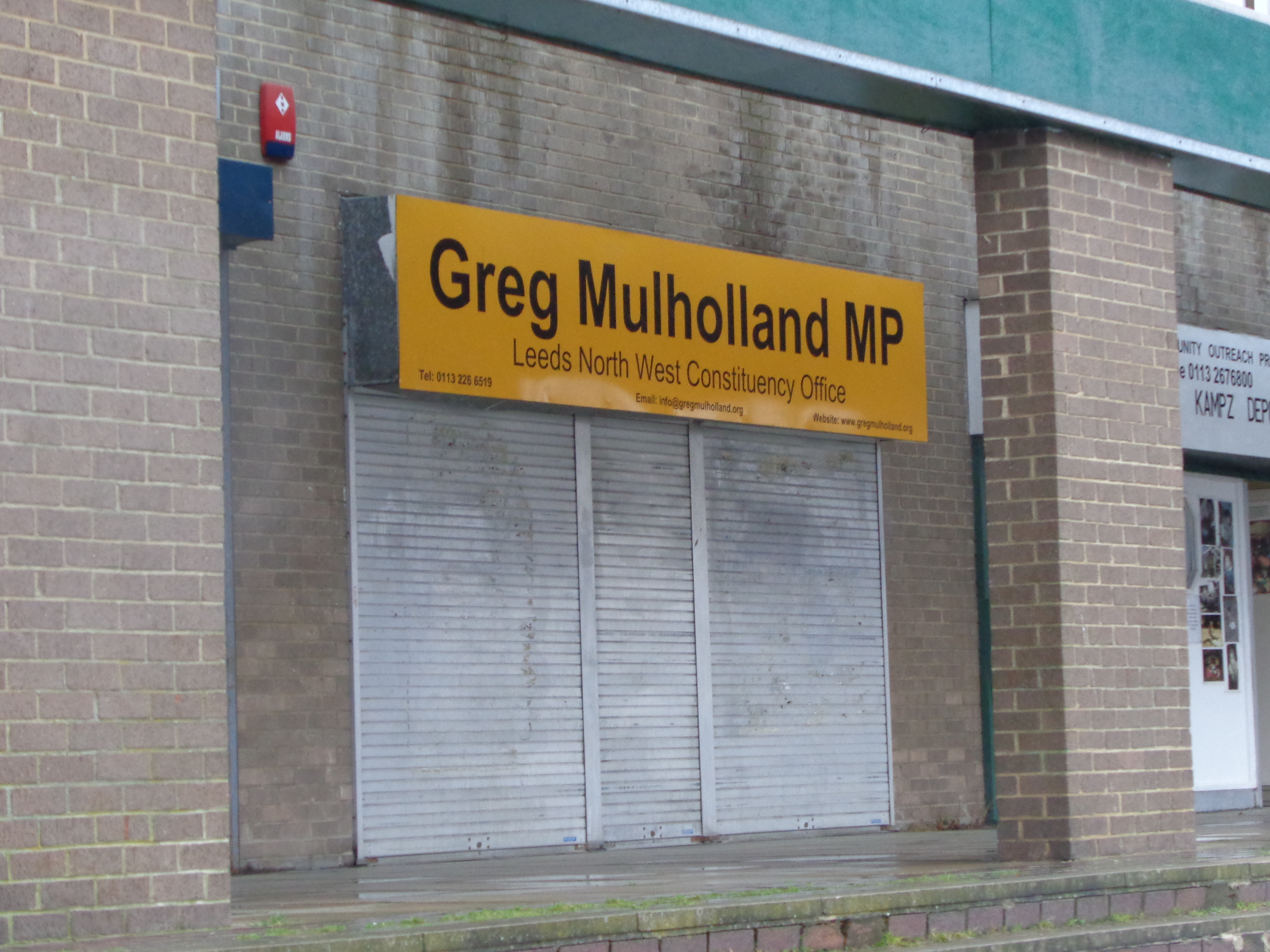
Greg Mulholland's constituency office at the Holt Park District Centre in North Leeds in 2013

Mulholland was elected to Parliament at the 2005 general election for the constituency of Leeds North West. This West Yorkshire constituency extends from inner-city Leeds through suburban and rural areas to the towns of Otley and Yeadon.

The seat had been held by the Conservative party from 1950 to 1997 and by the Labour party from 1997 to 2005. In the general election of 2010 the seat was retained by the Liberal Democrats with an increased majority. In the 2015 general election the seat was again retained by the Liberal Democrats, leaving Mulholland as one of eight Liberal Democrat Members of Parliament.

In the 2006 Liberal Democrat leadership election Mulholland backed Chris Huhne, who eventually finished second behind Menzies Campbell. In the 2007 Liberal Democrat leadership election he supported Nick Clegg. In the 2015 Liberal Democrat leadership election Mulholland backed Tim Farron.

In the 2017 general election Mulholland lost his seat to Labour's Alex Sobel, who gained a majority of 4,224.

=== Positions held ===
After his election to Parliament, he was appointed his party's junior International Development spokesperson from 2005 to 2006. In 2006 he was appointed Shadow Spokesperson on Schools, and in 2007 he became Shadow Spokesperson on Health. He was also a member of the House of Commons Work and Pensions Committee.

Mulholland was a member of 27 all-party parliamentary groups including 4 as chair or co-chair and 7 as vice chair.

=== Expenses ===
During and after the 2009 expenses scandal, Greg Mulholland's expense claims were generally without controversy and he was described as an angel by The Daily Telegraph after he called for stricter regulations. He did, however, have two claims rejected: for a cot and playpen, then later to have photographs reframed.

== Subjects of interest ==
=== Land banking ===
In November 2005, Mulholland proposed the Sale of Green Belt Land Bill to prevent 'land banking' (property speculation in Green Belt land). However, the bill did not receive a second reading and was dropped without becoming law.

=== Abortion ===
As a Roman Catholic, Mulholland describes himself as holding 'pro-life' views and has a strong voting record against abortion, embryology and euthanasia. Mulholland is one of three Liberal Democrat MPs to have supported MP Nadine Dorries's attempts to reduce the number of weeks at which a woman can legally have an abortion.

=== Voting record ===
According to ThePublicWhip.org, as of February 2013, Greg Mulholland has supported the Coalition Government 91.6% of the time in the 2010 Parliament.

=== Healthcare ===
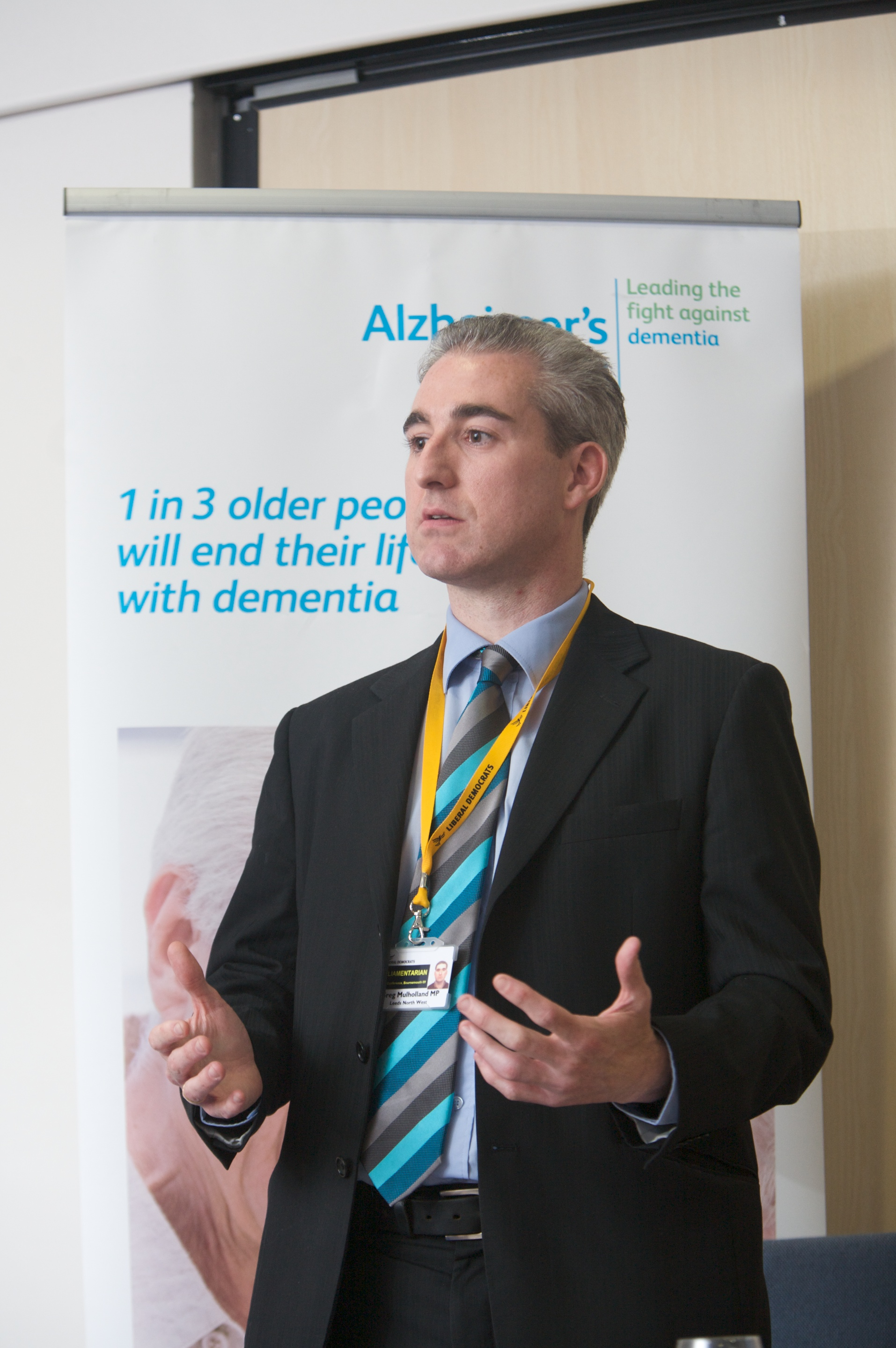
Mulholland speaking on dementia during a Health Hotel session at the 2009 Liberal Democrat Party Conference.

Mulholland took part in a community campaign in his constituency against further cuts at the Wharfedale Hospital in Otley. He called a public meeting at which he presented a 5,000-signature petition to Parliament after one ward was closed. He campaigned alongside other Leeds MPs for a new children's hospital in the city, questioning the then Prime Minister Tony Blair over the issue at Prime Minister's Questions.

He faced criticism for aspects of this campaign. An article in a Liberal Democrat Focus leaflet featuring Mulholland and distributed in Leeds claimed that the government had axed plans to build a new £204 million Children's Hospital at St James's, which had been backed by all the city's MPs. The Government claimed that this was untrue and that the decision had been made by the Leeds Hospital Trust without the Government's prior knowledge. Caroline Flint, Minister of State for Public Health, described the statement as: "taking political grandstanding too far. The article is not true, it is a complete misrepresentation."

=== Save the Pub ===
Greg Mulholland is an active campaigner for Save the Pub, an all party parliamentary group which aims to preserve and protect the Great British pub. In 2012, the group celebrated three years of success with the introduction of a special "Save the Pub Ale".

=== Rugby league ===
Mulholland set up a rugby league team called "Political Animals", based at Westminster, to bring greater prominence and attention to rugby league within Parliament. He plays left wing for the team. He is also a Vice President of the Leeds Rugby Foundation charity.

=== Other ===
Mulholland was criticised for calling a constituent a "disingenuous, manipulative, illiberal shit" over Twitter in response to the constituent's comments on his vote in favour of the Marriage (Same Sex Couples) Act 2013. The constituent's earlier message had said "After abstaining, voting for a wrecking amendment, then trying to abolish marriage, I'm glad @GregMulholland1 finally voted the right way". Mulholland said he supported same sex marriage but believed there were flaws in the legislation, and was frustrated at being misrepresented.

In 2007, he was nominated for best campaigning politician in the Channel 4 Political Awards for helping to secure the release of Mirza Tahir Hussain from prison in Pakistan. He has tabled Early Day Motions on a variety of subjects including support for small breweries, winter fuel payments for the severely disabled under 60, and against biometric data collection in schools.

In 2008, Mulholland was recorded describing health minister Ivan Lewis as an "arsehole" after Lewis refused to let him intervene in a Westminster Hall debate on hospice funding. He later publicly defended his comment.

Mulholland has also been active in seeking to expose companies which wish to move out of the Leeds area to reduce costs. In 2011 he tabled an Early Day Motion in parliament calling for a boycott of brands owned by Carlsberg due to their brewery being moved from Leeds.

== After Parliament ==
In September 2018 Mulholland announced that he would not be standing for election to Parliament in the next general election. He described the shock of losing his seat in the unexpected 2017 election, when "just eight weeks later I had lost my job, my career, our family income and actually to a great extent, my identity". He is establishing himself as a "specialist campaigning and public affairs consultant" and political campaigning would be incompatible with that role. He did not rule out the possibility of standing for Parliament again, but "only if we see real change in British politics". He would also devote more time to his band Summercross, whose album My Northern Heart was nearing completion. It was subsequently announced that Kamran Hussain had been selected as the Liberal Democrat candidate for Leeds North West. Hussain said "Greg Mulholland was a brilliant MP. He was hard working, focused on the constituency, and I would like to emulate his work".

In August 2019 the album My Northern Heart, with 12 songs written by Mulholland and performed by his band Summercross, was reported to be "Set to be released in the next few weeks". The songs refer to topics including the construction of the Bramhope Tunnel, the suicide of Big Country singer Stuart Adamson, the campaign for the restoration of hire boats on the River Wharfe at Otley, and Mulholland's campaigning work for community pubs.

== Personal life ==
He is married and has three daughters. The family lives in Otley.

In 2009, he completed the Belfast marathon in 3 hrs 18 mins 50 secs and the "Wessex 100 mile" walk in 38 hrs 24 mins, as a "126 mile challenge" to raise money for local charities, along with Otley & Yeadon councillor Ryk Downes and university lecturer Martin Rivett.

Parliament of the United Kingdom
Preceded by Harold Best	Member of Parliament for Leeds North West; 2005–2017	Succeeded by Alex Sobel
