= Leeds North West =

Parliamentary constituency in the United Kingdom

Coordinates: 53.88°N 1.66°W

- County constituency for the House of Commons
- Interactive map of boundaries since 2024
- Boundary within Yorkshire and the Humber
- County: West Yorkshire (West Riding of Yorkshire until 1974)
- Electorate: 71,592 (July 2024)
- Major settlements: Guiseley, Yeadon, Horsforth and Otley

Current constituency
- Created: 1950
- Member of Parliament: Katie White (Labour)
- Seats: One
- Created from: Leeds Central and Leeds North

Leeds North West is a constituency (Note: A county constituency (for the purposes of election expenses and type of returning officer)) in the City of Leeds which has been represented in the House of Commons of the UK Parliament since 2024 by Katie White, of the Labour Party. (Note: As with all constituencies, the constituency elects one Member of Parliament (MP) by the first past the post system of election at least every five years.)

== Constituency profile ==
Leeds North West is a constituency located in West Yorkshire. It forms part of the City of Leeds metropolitan borough, although it consists mostly of outlying towns and villages unconnected to the rest of Leeds. It contains the towns of Horsforth, Yeadon, Guiseley and Otley and the villages of Rawdon, Bramhope and Adel. Like the rest of Leeds, the constituency's towns have a history of textile manufacturing. Leeds Bradford Airport is located just east of Yeadon and is the headquarters of airline Jet2.com. Leeds Trinity University is in Horsforth and has around 14,000 students. The constituency is affluent with low levels of deprivation; most of it falls within the top 10% least-deprived areas of England. House prices are similar to the national average and considerably higher than the rest of Yorkshire.

Residents of Leeds North West are older, well-educated and likely to be homeowners compared to the rest of the country. They have high rates of household income and professional employment. A high proportion work in the education and transport sectors. White people made up 92% of the population at the 2021 census. At the local city council, Horsforth, Yeadon and Guiseley are represented by Labour Party councillors, Otley by Liberal Democrats and Adel and Bramhope by Conservatives. An estimated 57% of voters supported remaining in the European Union in the 2016 referendum, higher than the nationwide figure of 48%.

== History ==
The constituency was created in 1950, as Leeds North-West; the name was changed by dropping the hyphen in 1955. Before the 1950 general election, Leeds was represented by the constituencies of: Leeds Central, Leeds North, Leeds South, Leeds West, (all created 1885); Leeds North-East and Leeds South-East (both created 1918). There were also constituencies of Batley and Morley (created 1918) and Pudsey and Otley (created 1918 replacing Pudsey). Leeds North West was created before the 1950 election, and at the same time the Pudsey and Otley constituency was abolished, re-creating the Pudsey constituency and moving Otley into the Ripon constituency.

The constituency was held for the Conservative Party by Donald Kaberry from its creation in 1950 until his retirement in 1983, and then by Keith Hampson (1983–1997), who had previously been MP for Ripon. It was taken for Labour in the 1997 general election by Harold Best, who was re-elected in the 2001 general election. Best retired at the 2005 general election. The seat was contested for Labour by Judith Blake (at that time Deputy Leader of the Labour Group on Leeds City Council, and later also Labour's candidate in the 2010 general election), but it was taken for the Liberal Democrats by Greg Mulholland. Mulholland was re-elected in 2010 and 2015. Alex Sobel regained the seat for Labour in the 2017 general election, and was re-elected in 2019.

The notional 2019 result for the reconfigured constituency was a Conservative win. Accordingly, Alex Sobel decided to stand (successfully) in the 2024 general election for the new and much safer seat of Leeds Central and Headingley. The Leeds North West seat was won by Katie White for Labour, making it a notional gain from the Conservatives.

== Boundaries ==
Interactive map of boundaries 2010–2024

1950–1951: The County Borough of Leeds wards of Far Headingley, Hyde Park, and Kirkstall.

1951–1955: The County Borough of Leeds wards of Far Headingley, Hyde Park, Kirkstall, and Meanwood.

1955–1974: The County Borough of Leeds wards of Far Headingley, Hyde Park, Kirkstall, Meanwood, and Moortown.

1974–1983: The County Borough of Leeds wards of Cookridge, Headingley, Kirkstall, Moortown, and Weetwood.

1983–2010: The City of Leeds wards of Cookridge, Headingley, Otley and Wharfedale, and Weetwood.

The Leeds North West boundary was revised for the 1983 general election, bringing in Otley and the nearby villages of Bramhope, Pool-in-Wharfedale and Arthington from the abolished Ripon constituency. Moortown was transferred to Leeds North East, and Kirkstall to Leeds West.

2010–2024: The City of Leeds wards of Adel and Wharfedale, Headingley, Otley and Yeadon, and Weetwood.

Minor changes to reflect changes to ward names and boundaries.

2024–present: The City of Leeds wards of Adel and Wharfedale, Guiseley and Rawdon, Horsforth, and Otley and Yeadon.

Following the 2023 review of Westminster constituencies, which came into effect for the 2024 general election, the constituency boundaries were substantially changed although its name was unchanged. Headingley and Weetwood in the south of the 2010 constituency were moved to the new constituency of Leeds Central and Headingley, while Guiseley, Rawdon and Horsforth were transferred in from Pudsey (reconfigured and renamed Leeds West and Pudsey).

The old constituency was divided between the new constituency (85.7% by area and 50.2% by population of the old constituency) and Leeds Central and Headingley (14.3% by area and 49.8% by population). The new constituency was made up predominantly of parts of the old constituency (62.2% by area and 47.3% by population of the new constituency) and Pudsey (37.7% by area and 52.7% by population), with a small contribution from Leeds North East (0.1% by area and 0.0% by population).

The constituency currently covers the northwestern part of the City of Leeds metropolitan borough, West Yorkshire. It stretches from Otley in the north to Horsforth in the south, with Guiseley and Yeadon in between them in terms of major settlements.

== Members of Parliament ==
Election	Member	Party
1950	Sir Donald Kaberry	Conservative
1983	Keith Hampson	Conservative
1997	Harold Best	Labour
2005	Greg Mulholland	Liberal Democrat
2017	Alex Sobel	Labour Co-op
2024	Katie White	Labour

== Elections ==
=== Elections in the 2020s ===
General election 2024: Leeds North West
Party	Candidate	Votes	%	±%
Labour	Katie White	22,882	46.0	+7.7
Conservative	Thomas Averre	10,986	22.1	−19.8
Reform	Jayne Louise Bond	5,935	11.9	+10.6
Liberal Democrats	Ryk Downes	5,641	11.3	−3.5
Green	Mick Bradley	3,231	6.5	+4.2
Yorkshire	Bob Buxton	1,024	2.1	+0.6
SDP	Kathy Bushell	78	0.2	N/A
Majority		11,896	23.9	N/A
Turnout		49,777	69.5	−8.2
Registered electors		71,592		
Labour gain from Conservative		Swing	+13.8	

Note that the figures for gain and loss refer to comparisons with the notional 2019 result for the constituency with its revised boundaries.

=== Elections in the 2010s ===
2019 notional result
Party	Vote	%
Conservative	23,311	41.9
Labour	21,310	38.3
Liberal Democrats	8,212	14.8
Green	1,266	2.3
Others	844	1.5
Brexit Party	729	1.3
Turnout	55,672	77.7
Electorate	71,607	

General election 2019: Leeds North West
Party	Candidate	Votes	%	±%
Labour Co-op	Alex Sobel	23,971	48.6	+4.5
Conservative	Stewart Harper	13,222	26.8	+7.1
Liberal Democrats	Kamran Hussain	9,397	19.1	−15.9
Green	Martin Hemingway	1,389	2.8	+1.5
Brexit Party	Graeme Webber	1,304	2.7	New
Majority		10,749	21.8	+12.7
Turnout		49,283	73.0	+5.1
Labour Co-op hold		Swing		

General election 2017: Leeds North West
Party	Candidate	Votes	%	±%
Labour Co-op	Alex Sobel	20,416	44.1	+14.0
Liberal Democrats	Greg Mulholland	16,192	35.0	−1.8
Conservative	Alan Lamb	9,097	19.7	+1.1
Green	Martin Hemingway	582	1.3	−5.7
Majority		4,224	9.1	N/A
Turnout		46,287	67.9	−2.1
Labour Co-op gain from Liberal Democrats		Swing	+7.9	

General election 2015: Leeds North West
Party	Candidate	Votes	%	±%
Liberal Democrats	Greg Mulholland	15,948	36.8	−10.7
Labour Co-op	Alex Sobel	13,041	30.1	+9.1
Conservative	Alex Story	8,083	18.6	−8.0
Green	Tim Goodall	3,042	7.0	+5.8
UKIP	Julian Metcalfe	2,997	6.9	+5.5
Yorkshire First	Bob Buxton	143	0.3	New
Alliance for Green Socialism	Mike Davies	79	0.2	−0.1
Above and Beyond	Mark Flanagan	24	0.1	New
Majority		2,907	6.7	−14.2
Turnout		43,357	70.0	+3.5
Liberal Democrats hold		Swing	-9.9	

General election 2010: Leeds North West
Party	Candidate	Votes	%	±%
Liberal Democrats	Greg Mulholland	20,653	47.5	+10.6
Conservative	Julia Mulligan	11,550	26.6	−0.3
Labour	Judith Blake	9,132	21.0	−10.9
BNP	Geoffrey Bulmer	766	1.8	New
UKIP	Mark Thackray	600	1.4	New
Green	Martin Hemingway	508	1.2	−1.5
English Democrat	Alan Procter	153	0.4	−1.0
Alliance for Green Socialism	Trevor Bavage	121	0.3	−0.2
Majority		9,103	20.9	
Turnout		43,483	66.5	+3.7
Liberal Democrats hold		Swing	+5.4	

=== Elections in the 2000s ===
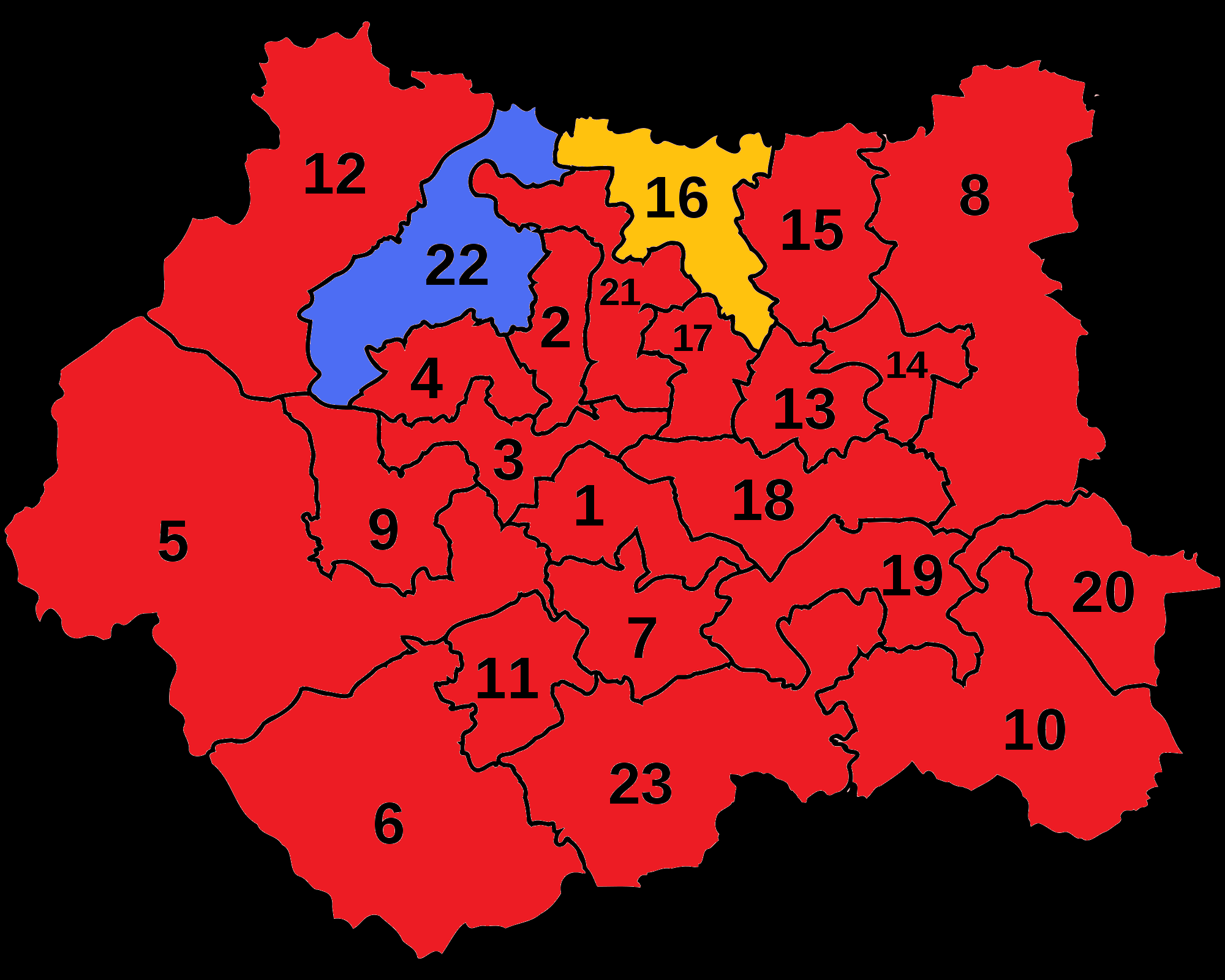
Leeds North West is shown here after the 2005 general election as the only Liberal Democrat constituency in West Yorkshire

General election 2005: Leeds North West
Party	Candidate	Votes	%	±%
Liberal Democrats	Greg Mulholland	16,612	37.2	+10.3
Labour	Judith Blake	14,735	33.0	−8.9
Conservative	George Lee	11,510	25.7	−3.9
Green	Martin Hemingway	1,128	2.5	New
English Democrat	Adrian Knowles	545	1.2	New
Alliance for Green Socialism	Jeannie Sutton	181	0.4	New
Majority		1,877	4.2	N/A
Turnout		44,711	62.4	+4.2
Liberal Democrats gain from Labour		Swing	+9.6	

General election 2001: Leeds North West
Party	Candidate	Votes	%	±%
Labour	Harold Best	17,794	41.9	+2.0
Conservative	Adam Pritchard	12,558	29.6	−2.5
Liberal Democrats	David Hall-Matthews	11,431	26.9	+3.2
UKIP	Simon Jones	668	1.6	New
Majority		5,236	12.3	+2.1
Turnout		42,451	58.2	−11.5
Labour hold		Swing		

=== Elections in the 1990s ===
General election 1997: Leeds North West
Party	Candidate	Votes	%	±%
Labour	Harold Best	19,694	39.9	+12.6
Conservative	Keith Hampson	15,850	32.1	−10.9
Liberal Democrats	Barbara Pearce	11,689	23.7	−4.1
Referendum	Sean Emmett	1,325	2.7	New
Socialist Labour	Roger Lamb	335	0.7	New
ProLife Alliance	Robert Toome	251	0.5	New
Ronnie the Rhino	Daniel Duffy	232	0.5	New
Majority		3,844	10.2	N/A
Turnout		46,376	69.7	−2.8
Labour gain from Conservative		Swing	+11.8	

General election 1992: Leeds North West
Party	Candidate	Votes	%	±%
Conservative	Keith Hampson	21,750	43.0	−0.5
Liberal Democrats	Barbara Pearce	14,079	27.8	−5.7
Labour	Sue Egan	13,782	27.3	+5.6
Green	David Webb	519	1.0	−0.3
Liberal	Noel Nowosielski	427	0.8	New
Majority		7,671	15.2	+5.1
Turnout		50,557	72.5	−3.2
Conservative hold		Swing	+2.5	

=== Elections in the 1980s ===
General election 1987: Leeds North West
Party	Candidate	Votes	%	±%
Conservative	Keith Hampson	22,480	43.5	−3.1
Liberal	Barry Peters	17,279	33.5	+4.5
Labour	Judith Thomas	11,210	21.7	−0.5
Green	A. Stevens	663	1.3	New
Majority		5,201	10.07	−7.5
Turnout		51,632	75.7	+4.4
Conservative hold		Swing	-3.8	

General election 1983: Leeds North West
Party	Candidate	Votes	%	±%
Conservative	Keith Hampson	22,579	46.6	−0.9
SDP	Norman Jones	14,042	29.0	N/A
Labour	John Battle	10,757	22.2	−12.9
Ecology	A. Laurence	673	1.4	−0.3
Ind. Conservative	C. Haygreen	437	0.9	New
Majority		8,537	17.6	+5.2
Turnout		48,488	71.3	−1.8
Conservative hold		Swing		

=== Elections in the 1970s ===
General election 1979: Leeds North West
Party	Candidate	Votes	%	±%
Conservative	Donald Kaberry	23,837	47.48	
Labour	Peter O'Grady	17,623	35.10	
Liberal	Laurence Keates	7,899	15.73	
Ecology	K. Rushworth	847	1.69	New
Majority		6,214	12.38	+3.05
Turnout		50,206	73.08	
Conservative hold		Swing		

General election October 1974: Leeds North West
Party	Candidate	Votes	%	±%
Conservative	Donald Kaberry	19,243	44.62	
Labour	I.G.K. Fenwick	15,216	35.29	
Liberal	David Rolfe	8,663	20.09	
Majority		4,027	9.33	
Turnout		43,122	66.28	
Conservative hold		Swing		

General election February 1974: Leeds North West
Party	Candidate	Votes	%	±%
Conservative	Donald Kaberry	21,995	44.73	
Labour	I.G.K. Fenwick	15,324	31.16	
Liberal	S. Waldenburg	11,853	24.11	
Majority		6,671	13.57	
Turnout		49,172	76.22	
Conservative hold		Swing		

General election 1970: Leeds North West
Party	Candidate	Votes	%	±%
Conservative	Donald Kaberry	29,227	52.13	
Labour	Kenneth Woolmer	20,795	37.09	
Liberal	J.R.W. Worrall	6,048	10.79	New
Majority		8,432	15.04	
Turnout		56,070	69.82	
Conservative hold		Swing		

=== Elections in the 1960s ===
General election 1966: Leeds North West
Party	Candidate	Votes	%	±%
Conservative	Donald Kaberry	30,168	55.65	
Labour	C.J. Morgan	24,044	44.35	
Majority		6,124	11.30	
Turnout		54,212	73.07	
Conservative hold		Swing		

General election 1964: Leeds North West
Party	Candidate	Votes	%	±%
Conservative	Donald Kaberry	29,859	51.97	
Labour	Dennis Burrill Matthews	18,862	32.83	
Liberal	R.H.J. Rhodes	8,728	15.19	New
Majority		10,997	19.14	
Turnout		57,449	77.20	
Conservative hold		Swing		

=== Elections in the 1950s ===
General election 1959: Leeds North West
Party	Candidate	Votes	%	±%
Conservative	Donald Kaberry	35,210	65.55	
Labour	Dennis Burrill Matthews	18,508	34.45	
Majority		16,702	31.10	
Turnout		53,718	77.58	
Conservative hold		Swing		

General election 1955: Leeds North West
Party	Candidate	Votes	%	±%
Conservative	Donald Kaberry	31,923	65.80	
Labour	Dennis Burrill Matthews	16,594	34.20	
Majority		15,329	31.60	
Turnout		48,517	75.64	
Conservative hold		Swing		

General election 1951: Leeds North West
Party	Candidate	Votes	%	±%
Conservative	Donald Kaberry	25,873	62.55	
Labour	Marian Veitch	15,490	37.45	
Majority		10,383	25.10	
Turnout		41,363	82.42	
Conservative hold		Swing		

General election 1950: Leeds North West
Party	Candidate	Votes	%	±%
Conservative	Donald Kaberry	24,161	57.80	
Labour	Victor Mishcon	14,562	34.84	
Liberal	Joseph Owen Hogley	3,078	7.36	
Majority		9,599	22.96	
Turnout		41,801	85.52	
Conservative win (new seat)				

== See also ==
- Parliamentary constituencies in West Yorkshire
- Parliamentary constituencies in Yorkshire and the Humber
