= Leeds South by-election =

Leeds South by-election may refer to:

- 1892 Leeds South by-election
- 1908 Leeds South by-election
- 1963 Leeds South by-election

== See also ==
- Leeds South (UK Parliament constituency)
