= John Lawson Walton =

British politician

Sir John Lawson Walton KC
- John Lawson Walton c. 1895

Member of Parliament for Leeds South
- In office 1892–1908
- Preceded by: Sir Lyon Playfair
- Succeeded by: William Middlebrook

Attorney General for England and Wales
- In office 1905–1908
- Preceded by: Sir Robert Finlay
- Succeeded by: Sir William Robson

Personal details
- Born: 4 August 1852
- Died: 19 January 1908 (aged 55) Great Cumberland Place, London, England
- Resting place: Ellesborough, Buckinghamshire, England
- Party: Liberal

Sir John Lawson Walton KC (4 August 1852 – 19 January 1908) was a British barrister and Liberal politician.

== Family and education ==
John Lawson Walton c1905

John Lawson Walton was the son of the Reverend John Walton MA, a Wesleyan missionary in Ceylon who later preached at Grahamstown in South Africa and who became President of the Wesleyan Methodist Conference for Great Britain in 1887 and was later President of the Wesleyan Conference for South Africa. His mother was Emma, the daughter of the Reverend Thomas Harris.

Walton was educated at Merchant Taylors' School, Great Crosby and at London University where he matriculated but did not graduate.

On 21 August 1882 at Glasgow Cathedral he married Joanna McNeilage Hedderwick, daughter of Robert Hedderwick (1806-1887), Queen`s printer and publisher of Glasgow, who was a founder and co-proprietor of the newspaper the Glasgow Citizen. Lawson Walton`s father was co-celebrant at the ceremony. One of Joanna`s brothers was Thomas Hedderwick (1850-1918), Liberal MP for Wick Burghs from 1896 to 1900. Lawson Walton and Joanna had three sons and two daughters. The executors of Lawson Walton`s will in 1908 were Thomas Hedderwick and his older brother James Hedderwick.

== Career ==
Walton, intending to become a barrister, joined the Inner Temple as a student on 2 November 1874. He was called to the bar in June 1877, having the previous year gained first prize in the common law examination. He was appointed Queen's Counsel on 4 February 1890, swearing the oath in the company of two other illustrious Liberals R B Haldane and H H Asquith. His early career was boosted by his close association with the Methodist Church in the West Riding of Yorkshire but he soon built up a large practice in London as well as on the circuit. He took part in many famous cases, most notably a victory in 1896 with a lawsuit brought against Dr William Smoult Playfair, a well-known London obstetrician, for libel and slander arising from Playfair's indiscretion concerning one of his medical cases. The £12,000 damages awarded against Playfair was at the time the largest sum awarded by a jury. Walton often appeared on behalf of trade unions, including in 1898 in the case of Allen v. Flood, a leading case in English law on intentionally inflicted economic loss.

Walton became close legal colleagues with Rufus Isaacs who was destined to have a glittering political and public career. He first encountered Isaacs in the latter's final year of study at the Middle Temple when Isaacs joined his chambers as a pupil. Walton was elected Bencher of the Inner Temple in 1897.

== Politics ==
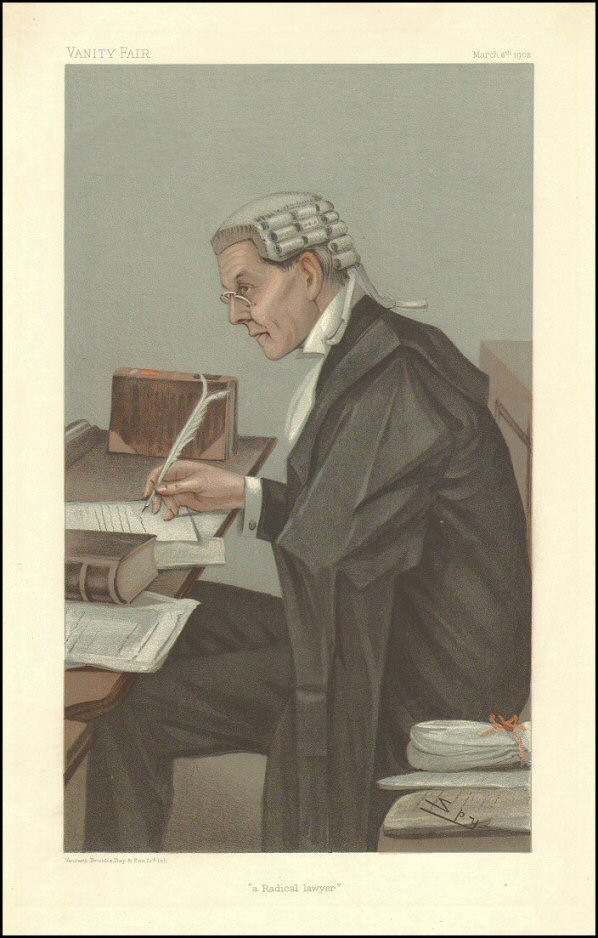
"a Radical lawyer". Caricature by Spy published in Vanity Fair in 1902.

In 1891, Walton was selected as Liberal candidate for Battersea to replace the sitting Liberal MP Octavius Vaughan Morgan who was standing down. However, John Burns, the well-known trade unionist and Lib-Lab politician, who was Progressive Party member of the London County Council for Battersea, had announced he intended to stand for election in Battersea at the next general election. Walton decided to stand aside so Burns could contest the seat. Burns was returned as MP for Battersea in 1892 as an Independent Labour Party candidate but soon after changed his description to Liberal-Labour and sat as a Lib-Lab until he stepped down from Parliamentary life at the 1918 general election.

Walton then sought adoption as Liberal candidate for Central Leeds and was selected to fight the 1892 general election. He lost narrowly to the sitting Conservative MP G. W. Balfour, but was given another chance to enter the House of Commons when the Liberal MP for the neighbouring Leeds South constituency, Sir Lyon Playfair went to the House of Lords, creating a by-election. Walton won the ensuing contest on 22 September 1892 beating his Conservative opponent R J N Neville by 948 votes (12 percent of the poll). He held the seat at each subsequent election until his death.

== Political orientation ==
Walton was said to be a strong radical in domestic politics, especially on issues concerning the House of Lords and the established church. He was a member of the Liberal Imperialist group associated with Lord Rosebery during the South African War of 1899–1902. The Liberal Imperialists were a centrist faction within the Liberal Party in the late Victorian and Edwardian period. They were in favour of a more positive attitude towards the development of the British Empire and Imperialism, ending the primacy of the party's commitment to Irish Home Rule. In domestic affairs they advocated the concept of "national efficiency". This policy was never definitively set out, but the implication in the speeches of its leading lights was that the Liberal Party in government should take action to improve the social conditions, the education and welfare of the population, as well as to reform aspects of the administration of government so as to maintain British economic, industrial and military competitiveness. Although Walton was not himself an Anglican he took an interest in religious questions. He was a witness before the Royal Commission on Ecclesiastical Discipline of 1904 when he spoke in favour of more effective procedure against clergy charged with breaking the law.

== Honours and appointments ==
Rosebery became more alienated by the Home Rule policy, dispiriting the moderates. Walton moving towards the centralists position was appointed Attorney-General in the newly formed government of Henry Campbell-Bannerman on 14 December 1905, and he was knighted on 18 December. He also sat as a Justice of the Peace for the county of Buckinghamshire where he had a country home at Butlers Cross.

== Trades Disputes Bill ==
One of Walton's first tasks as Attorney-General was to introduce the Trade Disputes Bill. As first drafted, the Bill made trade unions responsible for breaches of the law committed by their members and Walton defended the Bill against trade union calls for immunity, which he attacked as "class privileges". The Bill caused a major disagreement between the government and the Labour Party. Keir Hardie who was Leader of the Labour Party introduced a Bill of his own to give complete immunity. Campbell-Bannerman and the cabinet did a U-turn and instructed Walton to redraft the Trades Disputes Bill allowing immunity clauses, undermining Walton's position.

== Death ==
Walton had a history of ill-health and general frailty. As the 1906 Parliament wore on, his appearances in the House of Commons got rarer and he cut down his ministerial duties as much as possible. It was reported that attendance in the House through two all-night sittings when in charge of the Criminal Court Appeal Bill proved the last straw, and in January 1908 Walton developed a chill which developed into double pneumonia; he died on Saturday 18 January 1908, aged 55, at his house in Great Cumberland Place, London. He was buried at Ellesborough, near Wendover in Buckinghamshire on 22 January, and a memorial service was held at the Temple Church the following day.

== Papers ==
A number of letters written by Walton to Herbert Gladstone are deposited in the British Library manuscript collections.

Parliament of the United Kingdom
Preceded by Sir Lyon Playfair	Member of Parliament for Leeds South; 1892–1908	Succeeded by William Middlebrook
Legal offices
Preceded by Sir Robert Finlay	Attorney General for England and Wales; 1905–1908	Succeeded by Sir William Robson
