= William Middlebrook =

British politician (1851-1936)

Middlebrook

Sir William Middlebrook

Sir William Middlebrook, 1st Baronet (22 February 1851 – 30 June 1936) was an English solicitor and Liberal Party politician.

== Family and education ==
William Middlebrook was born at Birstall in the West Riding of Yorkshire the son of John Middlebrook and Eliza Priestley. His mother was a distant relation of Joseph Priestley the philosopher, theologian and scientist. He was educated at Huddersfield College. In 1880 he married Alma Jackson from Morley, the daughter of William Jackson, the founder of the Peel Mills in Leeds. They had one son and two daughters.

== Career ==
Middlebrook went in for the law. He served his articles at Barton-upon-Humber and was admitted as a solicitor in 1872 or 1873. He began to practice in Birstall but later moved to Leeds and Morley, where he lived at Thornfield House, now the Masonic Lodge. He built up a large practice in which he was later joined by his son Harold.

== Politics ==
Middlebrook held Liberal political views, perhaps strengthened by his active and lifelong membership of the Methodist Church. In 1883 he was elected a lay member of the Wesleyan Conference and in 1893 he became Treasurer of the Methodist General Chapel Committee. He entered Liberal politics and served as Hon. Secretary to the Spen Valley Liberal Association from 1885 to 1895. In 1892 he was elected a member of Morley Town Council and was appointed an Alderman in 1894. He was Mayor of Morley in 1896 and in 1904 and he served as Mayor of Leeds in 1910–11. He was made an Honorary Freeman of Morley in 1919. While he was Mayor of Leeds, Middlebrook inaugurated a scheme for extending Leeds Infirmary under which nearly £130,000 was raised. He received the honorary freedom of Leeds in 1926.

Middlebrook entered the House of Commons at a by-election in 1908 for Leeds South. The seat had become vacant on the death of the sitting Liberal MP, Sir John Lawson Walton (1852–1908) who held the office of Attorney General at the time of his death. It seems that one of the reasons Middlebrook was selected was his ability to give financial aid to the Leeds South Liberal Association. Walton had paid the salary of his political agent and Middlebrook undertook to pay the constituency £100 a year. This was at a time when MPs were not yet paid a salary. The by-election took place on 13 February 1908 and Middlebrook held the seat for the Liberals with a majority of 359 over his Unionist opponent Reginald Neville, with Labour's Albert Fox in third place. Middlebrook held his seat until the 1922 general election when he was defeated in a straight fight by Labour's Henry Charleton. He did not stand for Parliament again.

== Honours and appointments ==
Middlebrook was knighted in 1916 and created a baronet in 1930. He served on a number of Parliamentary committees. In 1918 he was appointed to a Select Committee to look into gas prices and dividends in the wake of damage to the industry during the First World War. In 1922 he was nominated as Chairman of an Inquiry set up by the International Labour Office of the League of Nations into the problem of disinfection of wool and hair infected with anthrax spores, especially relating to keeping flocks of sheep and related animal products free from contamination. Middlebrook acted as Chairman of the Local Legislation Committee of the House of Commons from 1913 to 1922 and it was in recognition for this work that he was knighted. With this background and his local government experience it was no surprise that he was appointed to sit on the Royal Commission on Local Government set up in 1928. He was sometime member of the Consultative Council on Local Heath Administration and also served as a Justice of the Peace.

After the death of Lord Oxford and Asquith in 1928, a memorial to the former Liberal leader and prime minister was erected in his birthplace of Morley. Middlebrook as a Freeman of the Borough offered to have a bronze bust and tablets of Lord Oxford's history erected in the Town Hall. The memorial was formally presented to the town of Morley by Middlebrook on 29 October 1928.

== Death and heir ==
After he retired Middlebrook moved from Morley to Scarborough where he died after a long illness on 30 June 1936 aged 85 years. He was succeeded to the Middlebrook Baronetcy by his son Harold (1887–1971).

Parliament of the United Kingdom
Preceded by Sir John Lawson Walton	Member of Parliament for Leeds South; 1908–1922	Succeeded by Henry Charleton
Baronetage of the United Kingdom
New creation	Baronet (of Oakwell); 1930–1936	Succeeded by Harold Middlebrook
