= Middlebrook baronets =

Extinct baronetcy in the Baronetage of the United Kingdom

The Middlebrook Baronetcy, of Oakwell in the Parish of Birstall in the County of York, was a title in the Baronetage of the United Kingdom. It was created on 4 February 1930 for William Middlebrook, previously Member of Parliament for Leeds South. The title became extinct on the death of the second Baronet in 1971.

== Middlebrook baronets, of Oakwell (1930) ==
- Sir William Middlebrook, 1st Baronet (1851–1936)
- Sir Harold Middlebrook, 2nd Baronet (1887–1971)
