= Colin Challen =

British Labour Party politician

Member of Parliament for Morley and Rothwell
- In office 8 June 2001 – 12 April 2010
- Preceded by: John Gunnell
- Succeeded by: Constituency Abolished

Personal details
- Born: 12 June 1953 (age 73) Scarborough, North Yorkshire, England
- Party: Labour
- Education: University of Hull
- Website: www.colinchallen.org

Colin Robert Challen (born 12 June 1953) is a British Labour Party politician, who was the Member of Parliament (MP) for Morley and Rothwell from 2001 until the constituency's abolition at the 2010 election.

== Early life ==
Challen was born in Scarborough, and educated at the Norton Secondary School in Norton-on-Derwent and the Malton Grammar School, before completing a philosophy degree at the University of Hull in 1983. In 1971, he was a supplier accountant for the Royal Air Force before becoming a postman in 1974. He set up business as a printer and publisher in 1982 until 1994 when he took up politics professionally as an organiser for the Labour Party. He was elected a councillor to Kingston upon Hull City Council for eight years from 1986.

== Career ==
Challen unsuccessfully stood for parliament at the 1992 general election in the constituency of Beverley. He finished in third place and more than 22,000 votes behind the winner James Cran. He entered parliament at the 2001 general election for Morley and Rothwell following the retirement through ill health of Labour MP John Gunnell. Colin Challen was elected with a majority of 12,090 and made his maiden speech on 25 June 2001, in which he spoke of Herbert Henry Asquith who was born in Morley. He was re-elected at the 2005 general election, retaining his seat with a majority of 12,343.

A member of the League Against Cruel Sports for over 40 years, he served on several select committees: The Environmental Audit Committee (since 2001), the Joint Committee on Consolidation of Bills (since 2001), the Unopposed Bills Panel (since 2004) and the DECC Select committee (2009/10). He is an Honorary Associate of the National Secular Society.

On 29 January 2007 Challen announced that he would not contest the 2010 general election after a Boundary Commission review abolished his constituency, thus letting Ed Balls contest the new Morley and Outwood constituency, formed from a merger of parts of Morley and Rothwell and Balls' also abolished Normanton constituency.

In 2013 Challen opened an art gallery called 'artHERENT' in Scarborough (North Yorkshire) Market, to display recent works. The first exhibition, "Is there any hope for the dead? Reliquaries and other items" started in September 2013. His most recent exhibition "Drawing on Myth" in 2017 was exhibited at the Woodend Creative Workspace in Scarborough. Challen also exhibited in Hull with the Kingston Art Group in 2017 following Hull being named as the City of Culture. In 2020 Challen gained an MA in fine art at Teesside University (MIMA School of Art and Design).

== Climate change work ==
Challen founded the All Party Parliamentary Group on Climate Change in 2005, and has written that he believes the "catastrophic destabilisation of global climate represents the greatest threat that humanity faces." In 2004, Challen presented a Ten Minute Rule Bill introducing the idea of David Fleming's TEQs scheme to Parliament, as a way of guaranteeing that promised emissions reductions would actually be achieved. In 2009, Challen tabled an early day motion calling for all internal UK flights to be phased out before the end of the year, in order to reduce greenhouse gases. He also urged Parliament to cut the national speed limit to 55 mph, and to dedicate two hours of prime-time television each week to explain the dangers posed by climate change.

In the May 2011 local elections, Challen was elected as a Labour member of Scarborough Borough Council, representing Castle ward.

== Works ==
- The Price of Power: Secret Funding of the Tory Party (VISION Investigations) by Colin Challen, 1998, Vision Paperbacks / Satin Publications, ISBN 1-901250-18-0
- In Defence of the Party: The Secret State, the Conservative Party and Dirty Tricks by Colin Challen, Mike Hughes 1996, Medium Publishing Co., ISBN 1-872398-01-4
- Too Little Too Late: The politics of climate change by Colin Challen, 2009 Picnic Publishing, ISBN 978-0-9560370-0-8

Parliament of the United Kingdom
Preceded by John Gunnell	Member of Parliament for Morley and Rothwell; 2001–2010	Constituency abolished
