= Neville baronets =

Extinct baronetcy in the Baronetage of the United Kingdom

Coat of arms of the Nevilles of Sloley
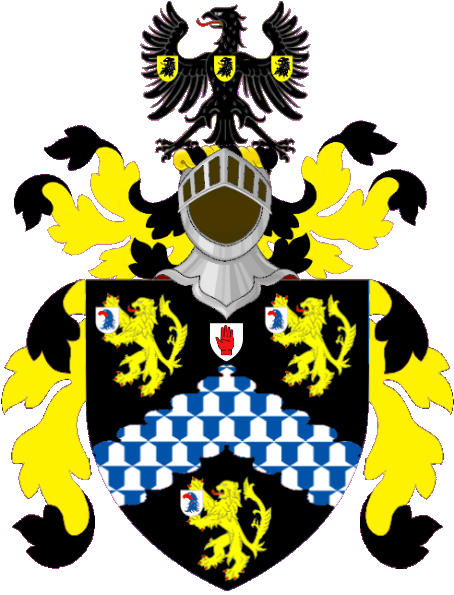
- Adopted: 1927
- Crest: An eagle displayed Sable on the breast and upon each wing an escutcheon Or charged with a lion’s head erased also Sable.
- Shield: Sable a chevron invected Vair between three lions rampant Or holding between the paws an escutcheon Argent charged with an eagle’s head erased Azure.
- Supporters: None

, The Neville baronetcy, of Sloley in the English county of Norfolk, was a title in the Baronetage of the United Kingdom. It was created on 2 July 1927 for the barrister and Conservative politician Reginald Neville. Born Reginald White, he was the son of James Sewell White, a judge of the High Court of Calcutta, who assumed his surname to Neville in 1885. In 1950, he was succeeded by his elder son James Edmund Henderson Neville, who became the second baronet. Sir James was the author of The War Letters of a Light Infantryman (1931), and also wrote under the pen name of 'Gaid Sakit'. The title became extinct on the death of the third baronet in 1994.

== Neville baronets, of Sloley (1927) ==
- Sir Reginald James Neville Neville, 1st Baronet (1863–1950)
- Sir James Edmund Henderson Neville, 2nd Baronet (1897–1982)
- Sir Richard Lionel John Baines Neville, 3rd Baronet (1921–1994)

== Sources ==
- Burke, Bernard; Burke, Ashworth P. (1934). A Genealogical and Heraldic History of the Peerage and Baronetage, the Privy Council, Knightage, and Companionage. Vol. 2 (92nd ed.). London: Burke's Peerage Ltd. OCLC 56832482.
