= Merlyn Rees =

British politician (1920–2006)

The Right Honourable The Lord Merlyn-Rees PC
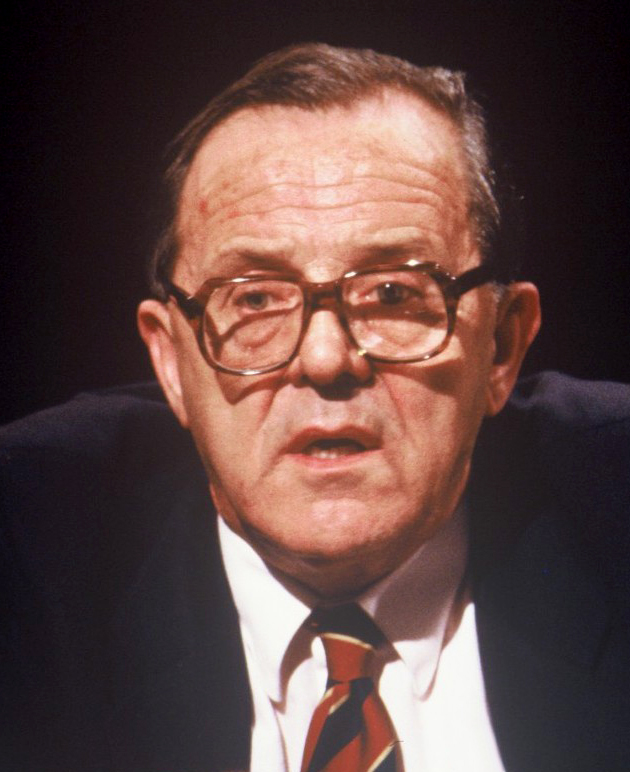
- Merlyn Rees on After Dark in 1988

Shadow Secretary of State for Energy
- In office 4 November 1980 – 24 November 1982
- Leader: Michael Foot
- Preceded by: David Owen
- Succeeded by: John Smith

Shadow Home Secretary
- In office 4 May 1979 – 4 November 1980
- Leader: James Callaghan
- Preceded by: William Whitelaw
- Succeeded by: Roy Hattersley

Home Secretary
- In office 10 September 1976 – 4 May 1979
- Prime Minister: James Callaghan
- Preceded by: Roy Jenkins
- Succeeded by: William Whitelaw

Secretary of State for Northern Ireland
- In office 5 March 1974 – 10 September 1976
- Prime Minister: Harold Wilson; James Callaghan
- Preceded by: Francis Pym
- Succeeded by: Roy Mason

Shadow Secretary of State for Northern Ireland
- In office 24 March 1972 – 4 March 1974
- Leader: Harold Wilson
- Preceded by: Position established
- Succeeded by: Francis Pym

Member of Parliament for Morley and Leeds South Leeds South (1963–1983)
- In office 20 June 1963 – 16 March 1992
- Preceded by: Hugh Gaitskell
- Succeeded by: John Gunnell

Member of the House of Lords
- Lord Temporal
- Life peerage 1 July 1992 – 5 January 2006

Personal details
- Born: Merlyn Rees; 18 December 1920 Cilfynydd, Wales
- Died: 5 January 2006 (aged 85) London, England
- Party: Labour
- Spouse: Colleen Cleverly (m. 1949)
- Children: 3
- Education: Goldsmiths, University of London; University of Nottingham; London School of Economics

Merlyn Merlyn-Rees, Baron Merlyn-Rees, PC (né Rees; 18 December 1920 – 5 January 2006) was a British Labour Party politician and Member of Parliament from 1963 until 1992. He served as Secretary of State for Northern Ireland (1974–1976) and Home Secretary (1976–1979).

== Early life ==
Rees was born in Cilfynydd, near Pontypridd, Glamorgan, the son of Levi Rees, a war veteran who moved from Wales to England to find work. He was educated at Harrow Weald Grammar School, Harrow, England and Goldsmiths College, London where he was president of the students' union. Goldsmiths was evacuated to Nottingham University early in the war, where Rees served in Nottingham University Air Squadron.

In 1941 Rees joined the Royal Air Force, becoming a squadron leader and earning the nickname "Dagwood". He served in Italy as operations and intelligence officer to No 324 Squadron under Group Captain W. G. G. Duncan Smith (father of the future Conservative leader). One of Rees's Spitfire pilots in Italy, Frank Cooper, became his Permanent Secretary at the Northern Ireland Office.

After the war, Rees declined a permanent commission in the RAF, and instead attended the London School of Economics where he received BSc(Econ) and MSc(Econ). He was appointed schoolmaster at his old school in Harrow in 1949, teaching economics and history. He taught for eleven years, during which time he was three times an unsuccessful parliamentary candidate for Harrow East, in 1955, 1959, and in a 1959 by-election. He was a member of the Institute of Education at the University of London from 1960 to 1962.

== Member of Parliament ==
At a by-election in 1963, Rees stood as the Labour candidate for Leeds South and succeeded Labour leader Hugh Gaitskell, who had died in office. (The constituency was renamed Morley and Leeds South in 1983.) He held the seat until he stepped down from the House of Commons at the 1992 general election.

In 1965 Rees became Parliamentary Under-Secretary at the Ministry of Defence, with responsibility for the army (1965–1966) and later for the Royal Air Force (1966–1968). Denis Healey, who was then Secretary of State for Defence, had served with Rees in the Italian campaign. Rees was Parliamentary Under-Secretary at the Home Office, where James Callaghan was Home Secretary, from November 1968 until the June 1970 general election.

In October 1971 Rees became Labour Party spokesman on Northern Ireland. When the Labour government returned to office in March 1974, he was appointed Secretary of State for Northern Ireland. One month after Rees's appointment, he lifted the proscription against the illegal loyalist paramilitary organisation, the Ulster Volunteer Force (UVF) to bring them into the democratic process. The UVF was implicated in the 17 May 1974 Dublin and Monaghan bombings and the group was banned again by the British Government on 3 October 1975. Rees' decision to permit the Sunningdale power sharing arrangements to collapse in Northern Ireland was described as 'supine' by former SDLP leader, Seamus Mallon. Rees was almost assassinated by the IRA in July 1976. He was to travel to the Republic to consult with the Ambassador Christopher Ewart-Biggs and Irish ministers but postponed his trip after Margaret Thatcher refused to allow Northern Ireland ministers to pair their votes in House of Commons divisions. Rees wrote later that it seemed likely the IRA had known of his impending visit but were unaware of its cancellation. Ewart-Biggs and FCO official Judith Cooke died in a landmine explosion.

Rees later wrote of his experiences in Northern Ireland in Northern Ireland: a Personal Perspective. In September 1976 Rees was appointed Home Secretary and remained in that post until Labour's defeat in the 1979 UK elections.

=== Retirement ===
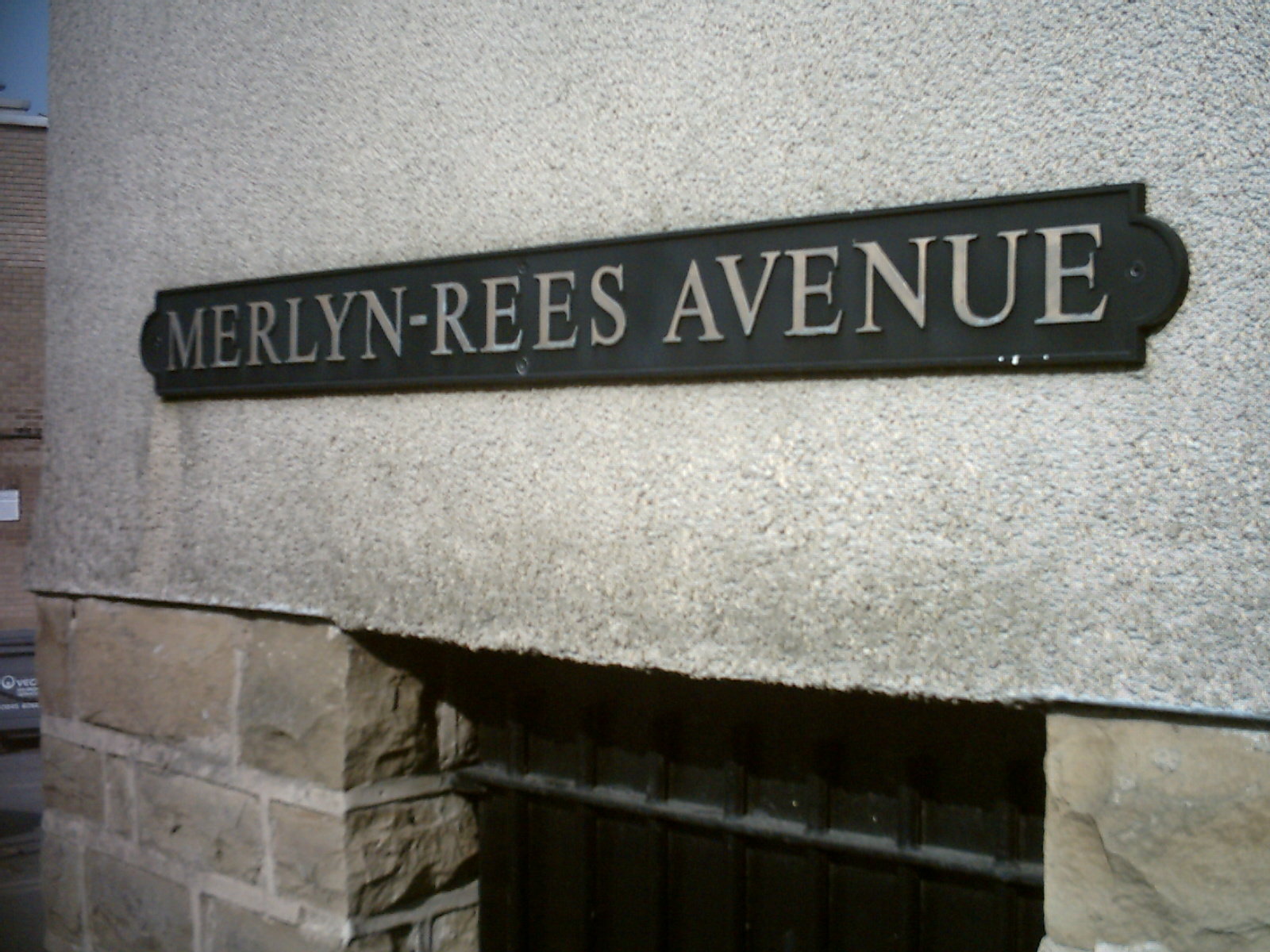
Merlyn Rees Avenue, street sign in Morley, West Yorkshire

When Rees retired from the House of Commons in 1992, he was created a life peer as Baron Merlyn-Rees, of Morley and South Leeds in the County of West Yorkshire and of Cilfynydd in the County of Mid Glamorgan and entered the House of Lords, having changed his name, on 23 June 1992, by deed poll to Merlyn Merlyn-Rees to allow his title to be Merlyn-Rees rather than Rees. Rees was president of the Video Standards Council from 1990 and was the first Chancellor of the University of Glamorgan, a position he held from 1994 to 2002.

== Personal life and death ==
In 1949, Rees married Colleen Cleveley, and they had three sons. Rees suffered injuries in a number of falls in his last years. In late 2005, a fall at his home in Southwark caused him to lapse into a coma, from which he never emerged; he died at St Thomas's Hospital on 5 January 2006, at the age of 85.

=== Legacy ===
Merlyn Rees Avenue in Morley, West Yorkshire is named after Rees. Merlyn Rees Community High School in Belle Isle, Leeds was named after Rees until its merger with Mathew Murray Comprehensive School in 2006 when it was renamed South Leeds High School.

== Reading ==
- Merlyn Rees, "Northern Ireland: a personal perspective", London: Methuen, 1985.

Parliament of the United Kingdom
Preceded by Hugh Gaitskell	Member of Parliament for Leeds South; 1963–1983	Constituency abolished
New constituency	Member of Parliament for Morley and Leeds South; 1983–1992	Succeeded by John Gunnell
Political offices
Preceded by Francis Pym	Secretary of State for Northern Ireland; 1974–1976	Succeeded by Roy Mason
Preceded by Roy Jenkins	Home Secretary; 1976–1979	Succeeded by William Whitelaw
Academic offices
New title	Chancellor of the University of Glamorgan; 1994–2002	Succeeded by The Lord Morris of Aberavon
