= Henry Charleton =

British politician (1870-1959)

Henry Charles Charleton (1 March 1870 – 8 October 1959) was a British train driver, trade unionist and Labour Party politician. He sat in the House of Commons from 1922 to 1931 and from 1935 to 1945.

== Early life and family ==
Charleton was born in Kentish Town, in London. His father Henry Charleton was an engine-driver on the Midland Railway.

The younger Henry was educated at Mansfield Place Board School, which he left at age 12. He worked initially as an assistant to a blacksmith, before following his father into the Midland Railway. He rose through the grades and eventually became a driver.

In 1897, Charleton married Louisa Jane Alcock from Kentish Town. They had one son.

== Career ==
Whilst working on the railways, Charleton studied at the St Pancras Working Men's College, and became active in the National Union of Railwaymen (NUR). In 1919 he compiled the Locomotive Men's Conditions of Service and later became a member of the NUR's executive committee.

He was elected at the 1922 general election as the Member of Parliament (MP) for Leeds South, and held the seat until his defeat in 1931. The formation of the National Government had undermined support for Labour, and in many constituencies the Liberal and Unionist parties fielded a single candidate in support of the National Government. However, Leeds South was contested by the Liberal and Unionists, so Charleton was expected to hold the seat. However the Unionist candidate Noel Whiteside took the seat with a majority of 2.0% of the votes.

Described by The Times as a "moderate", he regained the seat at the 1935 general election, and held it until he retired from the House of Commons at the 1945 general election.

He was chairman of the Select Committee on Estimates in 1930, and from 1929 to 1931 he served as Parliamentary Private Secretary to William Lunn, the Under-Secretary of State for Dominion Affairs. He was a briefly a Junior Lord of the Treasury, in 1931.

He also served as an alderman on London County Council.

Parliament of the United Kingdom
Preceded by William Middlebrook	Member of Parliament for Leeds South; 1922 – 1931	Succeeded by Noel Whiteside
Preceded by Noel Whiteside	Member of Parliament for Leeds South; 1935 – 1945	Succeeded by Hugh Gaitskell
