= Noel Whiteside =

British politician

Borras Noel Hamilton Whiteside (12 December 1903 – 13 June 1948) was a British company director and politician, who served a single term as a Conservative Member of Parliament (MP). He was noted for his interest in aviation, being a private pilot and frequently raising the issue of air defence in Parliament. During the Second World War he was a senior civil servant; at the end he fought again for a seat in Parliament but was unsuccessful.

== Family and early life ==
Whiteside's father, Capt. R. Borras Whiteside RASC, died on active service in France during the First World War, when he was 11. His mother, Leonore, was a daughter of 9th Lord Belhaven and Stenton. Whiteside was sent to Wellington College, and went on to University College London. After leaving university he went into the insurance business and in 1925 was made West End Local Director of the London and Scottish Assurance Company. Whiteside also became a civilian pilot, holding an A licence.

== 1931 election ==
After spending several years public speaking in support of Conservative Party causes, Whiteside was adopted as the Conservative candidate for Leeds South, a seat held for the Labour Party by Henry Charleton who was a Whip for his party. When the general election was called in October 1931, the Conservatives hoped that Whiteside and Charleton would have a straight fight. However at the last moment Captain Frederick Boult came forward as a Liberal Party candidate, having withdrawn from fighting at Buckrose. This shift was thought to make the election more difficult for Whiteside, and Charleton was expected to win the election. However, on polling day Leeds South was part of the landslide result, with Whiteside winning a majority of 725 over Charleton and Boult coming a poor third.

== Parliament ==
Whiteside made his maiden speech in March 1932 on the Air Estimates. He opposed a Labour suggestion that civil aviation be transferred to the League of Nations and called for lower costs for compulsory government inspection of aircraft and for local authorities to build airfields closer to centres of population.

After the Ottawa Conference concluded in 1932, Whiteside made a speech supporting its outcome and attacking the idea of a meat quota during which he described quotas as "Socialism run mad". With the rise to prominence of the British Union of Fascists and its 'Blackshirts', Whiteside urged in January 1934 that no political body be allowed to wear a uniform because doing so would be liable to lead to breaches of the peace. He also urged adoption of the 24-hour clock. Whiteside was a supporter of the International League Against the Export of Horses, and spoke at a May 1934 meeting in support of the Export of Horses Bill which made illegal the trade in live horses for meat.

=== Air Force ===
Increasingly Whiteside took up issues concerning the strength of the Royal Air Force. In 1933 he argued that it was so inadequate to Britain's defence that it was inviting attack. During the debate on the 1934 Air Estimates, Whiteside spoke of Stanley Baldwin's remark the previous year that "the bomber will always get through" and rhetorically asked what was the point of such a large expenditure on the RAF if it could not defend Britain. He implicitly disagreed with Baldwin, calling attention to the RAF's success in preventing the Gotha bombers breaking through after May 1918. In April 1934 he took up the matter with Prime Minister Ramsay MacDonald, pressing for the RAF to be built up to parity with other countries. He also suggested that six aircraft carriers would be sufficient to protect the Royal Navy against air attack throughout the world.

== 1935 election ==
On 6 June 1935, Whiteside married Dorothy Farrington at Speldhurst in Kent. That November, a new general election required him to defend his seat against Henry Charleton, who attempted to regain it for the Labour Party. Whiteside having been an unexpected winner in what was regarded as a safe Labour seat, he was thought to be vulnerable. There was again a three-cornered contest with the third candidate coming from the Social Credit Party of Great Britain and Northern Ireland, one of only three candidates in the election. After a keen contest, Charleton regained his seat with a majority of 1,016.

== Wartime ==
Whiteside remained involved in politics, and was a member of the Carlton Club and the United Club. He also became director of an aircraft company. During World War II, he became a civil servant, working as Assistant Divisional Food Officer for London from 1939. Two years later he was promoted to be a Principal at the Board of Trade. From 1942 he was Deputy Director of Salvage and Recovery for the Ministry of Supply. At the end of the war, Whiteside was adopted as Conservative candidate for the newly created division of Wembley South. Whiteside's campaign asked "Are you going to sack Winston Churchill? That is the issue." However the Labour candidate won the seat with a majority of 3,431.

Parliament of the United Kingdom
Preceded by Henry Charleton	Member of Parliament for Leeds South; 1931 – 1935	Succeeded by Henry Charleton
