= 1908 Leeds South by-election =

UK parliamentary by-election

- 13 February 1908

Candidate	Middlebrook	Neville	Fox
Party	Liberal	Conservative	Labour
Popular vote	5,274	4,915	2,451
Percentage	41.7%	38.9%	19.4%
MP before election
John Lawson Walton
Liberal
Subsequent MP
William Middlebrook
Liberal

The 1908 Leeds South by-election was a parliamentary by-election for the British House of Commons constituency of Leeds South in the West Riding of Yorkshire held on 13 February 1908.

== Vacancy ==
The by-election was caused by the death of the sitting Liberal MP, John Lawson Walton. Lawson was Attorney-General in the Liberal government of Henry Campbell-Bannerman and had been MP for Leeds South since 1892 when he himself won the seat at a by-election.

== History ==
Walton

General election 1906: Leeds South
Party	Candidate	Votes	%	±%
Liberal	John Walton	6,200	50.2	−1.0
Labour Repr. Cmte.	Albert E. Fox	4,030	32.6	New
Conservative	Henry Cameron-Ramsay-Fairfax-Lucy	2,126	17.2	−31.6
Majority		2,170	17.6	+15.2
Turnout		12,356	81.7	+9.8
Registered electors		15,119		
Liberal hold		Swing	+15.3	

== Candidates ==
=== Liberals ===
The South Leeds Liberals selected William Middlebrook, a 57-year-old solicitor to be their candidate. Middlebrook had been a local councillor in Leeds and Morley and it seems that one of the reasons he was selected was his ability to give financial aid to the Leeds South Liberal Association. John Lawson Walton had had paid the salary of his political agent and Middlebrook undertook to pay the constituency £100 a year.

=== Conservatives ===
The Conservatives originally seemed to be favouring the candidacy of Sir Henry Fairfax-Lucy, scion of the well-known Lucy family. Sir Henry had fought Leeds South for the Tories at the 1906 general election. However Sir Henry was a free-trader, which was a traditional Liberal policy and the Conservatives feared that tariff reform would become a controversial topic in the election if they chose Sir Henry as their man. Perhaps to enable the local Conservatives to overcome this problem, Fairfax-Lucy diplomatically announced that he was not able to stand for Parliament at this time because he was too busy with the Territorial Force Association in Warwickshire of which he was chairman.

At a meeting on 27 January 1908, the local Conservative organisation in Leeds South adopted R J Neville, the Recorder of Bury St Edmunds as their candidate. Neville was 44 years old and had unsuccessfully contested South Leeds for the Conservatives on four previous occasions.

=== Labour ===
The Labour candidate at the 1906 general election, Albert E. Fox, the secretary of the Associated Society of Locomotive Engineers and Firemen expressed his desire to stand again at the by-election but members of a rival railway trade union, the Amalgamated Society of Railway Servants had protested against his candidacy and this caused some doubt over Labour's participation. It seems there had been a falling out between Fox and some railway workers over the tactics and policies to be adopted in respect of union campaigning for improved working conditions and union recognition by the employers. There was considerable discord between the two unions over strategy and Fox's loyally to the labour cause was questioned. For some of his labour colleagues it was clear that Fox's socialism did not go far enough. It was reported that Fox had secured the approval of party headquarters but the local Labour Representation Committee (LRC) were required to endorse him and there remained a danger that if he stood, a rival Labour candidate would enter the field as well. The National Council of the Independent Labour Party had considered standing T R Williams who had been the Labour candidate in Huddersfield in 1906 among other possibles but these men withdrew their interest due to lack of funding to fight a campaign.

In the final week of January, the Labour party had officially appointed Joseph Pointer as their candidate. Pointer was aged 32 and a trades council activist from Sheffield, a member of the United Patternmakers' Association. It was reported he and his supporters had started campaigning in Leeds but by the end of the month Pointer had withdrawn from the field, the internal struggles in the Labour organisation having taken their toll. Fox emerged after all as Labour's candidate for the by-election despite the reservations of the local LRC about whether or not they should actively support his campaign. In the end the LRC voted by 89 votes to 85 not to endorse Fox's candidature but, despite this setback, he carried on as the representative of labour in the election fight.

== Election issues ==
Neville issued his election address on 30 January, declaring himself a loyal supporter of Arthur Balfour. He agreed with Balfour's policy to reduce unemployment by taxation reform. He spoke in favour of freedom for Roman Catholic, Nonconformist and Jewish parents to choose to have their children taught about their religion. Neville was expected to carry the 900 or so votes of the Catholic community who strongly opposed national and local measures taken by the Liberal Party in respect of education and training which they claimed would destroy the character of Catholic schools. However Irish voters in the constituency were divided in their loyalties, supporting Neville's stance on Catholic education but disliking his party's opposition to Irish Home Rule. Neville also opposed the Licensing Bill, which proposed restoration of local control of drinking establishments, a reduction in the number of public houses and the abolition of certain rights to compensation of suppressed licence-holders. Neville called this an attempt to confiscate without full and reasonable compensation the interests of the property of a trade which has received the sanction and encouragement of the state. It was reported that all sections of the licensing trade were aligning themselves with Neville.

Middlebrook's election address was a generally uncontroversial tract, pledging support for the policies of the Liberal government and avowed his support for Free Trade. However he found it necessary (possibly even on the instruction of party headquarters in London) to specify his support for the granting of votes for women, who were qualified. At this time the suffragettes were campaigning against all Liberal candidates in by-elections, whatever their declared opinion on votes for women, in protest at the government's unwillingness to bring in a women's suffrage Bill and in retaliation for the government's crackdown on their growing militancy. They promised to attend all Liberal meetings during the election, to heckle and disrupt proceedings. They were apparently unable to make good the threat, as it was reported at the beginning of February that the suffragettes had confined their campaign to the handing out of leaflets, although both Mary Gawthorpe and Emmeline Pankhurst visited the constituency before the election to campaign against Middlebrook and one source records that one suffragette organiser arranged twenty-two meetings in one week alone.

At one meeting on the eve of poll, close to the location of a pro-Middlebrook meeting being addressed by Rowland Barran the Liberal MP for Leeds North, the suffragettes called on electors to keep out the Liberal in retaliation for the government's having sent 54 women to prison for their part in the votes for women movement. The Liberals in Leeds were definitely divided on the issue of women's suffrage and the government's response to the actions of the Women's Social and Political Union, the main suffragette organisation and one local suffragette recorded that some Liberal women refused to work or canvass for Middlebrook.

Fox's election address declared in favour of social reform, including the immediate introduction of old age pensions, unemployment relief and education reform free from religious sectarianism or class favouritism. He supported free trade and universal adult suffrage, no doubt hoping to gain the support of the suffragettes and those voters who were in favour of their campaign.

== Result ==
Middlebrook held the seat for the Liberals with a majority of 359 votes over Neville who restored the Conservatives to second place, Fairfax-Lucy having come bottom of the poll at the 1906 general election. Fox forfeited the second place he had achieved in 1906. While the government was no doubt pleased to retain the seat, the increase of 2,700 votes for the Conservatives and the loss of 1,000 for the Liberals and 1,600 for Labour (Fox presumably suffering from the damaging split in the labour ranks over his candidature) must have been a disappointment to Middlebrook and the Liberal Party, given the turnout was much the same as at the previous general election. The Leeds South result followed the loss of Ashburton on 17 January and of the Ross or Southern Division of Herefordshire on 31 January, both seats falling to the Liberal Unionists. But all governments suffer mid-term reverses and the government elected in 1906 was voted in with a landslide majority.

Middlebrook

1908 Leeds South by-election
Party	Candidate	Votes	%	±%
Liberal	William Middlebrook	5,274	41.7	−8.5
Conservative	Reginald Neville	4,915	38.9	+21.7
Labour	Albert E. Fox	2,451	19.4	−13.2
Majority		359	2.8	−14.8
Turnout		12,640	82.5	+0.8
Registered electors		15,321		
Liberal hold		Swing	+2.4	

== Aftermath ==
The government continued to lose by-elections down to the next general election in January 1910 but they held many seats too, an indicator that the tide of public opinion was not flowing irreversibly away from the Liberal Party. In parliament, one of the first actions Middlebrook took on 28 February was to vote in favour of granting the vote to women. In Leeds South, Middlebrook went on to increase his majority substantially in January 1910, albeit in a straight fight with the Conservatives. Even in a three-cornered contest in December 1910 he managed a majority of 2,260.

General election January 1910: Leeds South
Party	Candidate	Votes	%	±%
Liberal	William Middlebrook	8,969	67.3	+25.6
Conservative	William Nicholson	4,366	32.7	−6.2
Majority		4,603	34.6	+31.8
Turnout		13,335	84.8	+2.3
Liberal hold		Swing	+15.9	

== See also ==
- 1892 Leeds South by-election
- List of United Kingdom by-elections
- United Kingdom by-election records
