= 1892 Leeds South by-election =

UK parliamentary by-election

The 1892 Leeds South by-election was a parliamentary by-election for the British House of Commons constituency of Leeds South in the West Riding of Yorkshire held on 22 September 1892.

== Vacancy ==
The by-election was caused by the elevation to the peerage of the sitting Liberal MP, Sir Lyon Playfair. Playfair had been MP for Leeds South since its creation for the 1885 general election. In his letter to his constituency association informing them of his peerage, Playfair said it had been a wholly unexpected honour, a point later repeated in his memoirs and correspondence. Playfair was a distinguished chemist and expert in sanitation. He had worked closely with Prince Albert, the Prince Consort on a scheme for filtering sewage to fertilize the royal estate at Osborne House and later on plans for the Great Exhibition of 1851. As well as his past association with Price Albert, Playfair was a German speaker with strong Scottish connections so it was, perhaps, not surprising when he was created Baron Playfair of St Andrews and made Lord-in-waiting to Queen Victoria.

== Candidates ==
=== Liberals ===
The South Leeds Liberals held a selection meeting on 26 August 1892 and, having considered a number of possible candidates, they decided to invite John Lawson Walton to defend the seat. Walton was aged 40 and was a successful barrister on the north-eastern circuit who also had a practice in London. At the 1892 general election, just a few weeks earlier, he had been the Liberal candidate for Leeds Central when he lost narrowly to the sitting Conservative MP G W Balfour.

=== Conservatives ===
The Conservatives met on 24 August 1892 and resolved to contest the by-election. They selected 29-year-old Reginald Neville, also a barrister to fight the seat. Neville had been Playfair’s opponent at the 1892 general election when he had slightly reduced the Liberal majority. He was formally adopted on 6 September.

=== Labour ===
It was expected that a candidate representing labour would enter the fray. A deputation of working men invited James M’Gregor, the general secretary of the National Labourers’ Federation to stand as a Labour candidate. M’Gregor seemed to be willing. He said he would submit the offer to the executive committee of his union and be bound by their decision. It is not known if the union were opposed to M’Gregor’s candidacy but a few days later it was reported that another trade union official, Mr J Solly, the organising secretary of the Railway Labourers’ Union, had accepted an invitation to fight the by-election for Labour. But Solly’s acceptance may have been premature because Leeds Trade Council were unable to approve him until the Railway Labourers’ Union agreed to contribute a substantial sum towards election expenses.

Neither of these potential candidacies came to anything however as the Leeds Trades Council decided it would be counter-productive to stand a labour candidate and risk splitting the anti-Tory vote. However, as the by-election approached, another union man, John Lincoln Mahon, of the Leeds and District Gasworkers Union declared that he would be standing for labour as he had secured the support of the socialist journalist and activist Henry Hyde Champion, regarded as one of the leading spirits behind the formation of the Independent Labour Party. Champion had promised financial backing for Mahon to contest the by-election. Mahon said he would stand as an Independent in view of the decision of the local Trades Council not to endorse a candidate standing explicitly in the labour interest.

== Campaign ==
The principal excitement of the campaign was the animosity between the Liberal and Labour camps. On 17 September, Mahon held an election meeting at the Hunslet Mechanics’ Institute. Almost from the outset the meeting deteriorated into disorder and violence. The culprits were said to be a large contingent of Irishmen who had deliberately occupied the seats at the front of the hall, many of whom were said to be intoxicated with drink. They howled down Mahon’s platform supporters and then rushing the stage they attacked Mahon himself and his party causing injuries requiring doctors to be called. At a more peaceful meeting the next night in Leeds, Mahon accused Lawson Walton of stirring up and inciting the attackers on the assumption they were supporters of the Liberal cause of Home Rule.

Champion wrote an angry letter to The Times complaining that Walton had held a meeting on 16 September in which he had done his best to ‘inflame the minds of his partisans against the labour candidate and his supporters’. Champion stopped just short of accusing Walton of commissioning the break-up of the labour meeting and of supplying the Irishmen with drink but pointed out that they came to the meeting with a plentiful supply of election literature from the Liberal committee-rooms. He claimed the Liberals were increasingly worried about the rise of political labour and the threat this represented to Liberal electoral hopes. It was ironic that this charge was levelled at Walton, as he had stood aside as Liberal candidate in Battersea only the previous year when John Burns, the trade unionist indicated he proposed to stand in the seat at the 1892 election as an Independent Labour candidate.

Another Labour meeting on 19 September, addressed by Keir Hardie pressed the issue of the representation of the working classes and whether this could ever adequately be done by the middle-class capitalists and professional men who dominated Liberal politics. The meeting was full of disturbance. Mr Sweeney of the Leeds Trade Council spoke against Mahon's candidacy and a vote of confidence in Mahon was proposed and lost by a large margin. A further meeting took place later and the proceedings were reported as being ‘uproarious’ with the police called, albeit without a repeat of the violence of the Hunslet meeting.

Both Walton and Neville publicly denounced the violence against Mahon.

== Nominations ==
Nominations were put in at Leeds Town Hall on 20 September. Those of Walton and Neville were accepted by the Mayor. However an objection was made to Mahon’s paper and after long consideration his nomination was rejected as invalid owing to the incorrectness of the name and address of his nominator. As a result, the contest was a straight fight between Walton and Neville. Mahon proceeded to issue his written manifesto but he could not contest the election itself. It was later alleged however that Mahon engineered the rejection of his nomination paper. It was said, admittedly by his opponents, that there had been ample time between the pointing out of the defect and the deadline for nomination to get a qualified supporter to sign the paper and so make it legal.

== Result ==
The failure of Mahon to get himself on the ballot paper, real or manufactured, solved the problem for the traditional working class voters of South Leeds of deciding which non-Conservative candidate to support. This was perhaps just as well as the Liberal majority over the Conservative fell for the third successive election and a vote split between Liberal and Labour parties might have been enough to deliver the seat to Neville. The continued decline may have had to do with Walton’s being new to the constituency compared to the previous, well-known incumbent and Neville’s name being known from the general election a couple of months before. It is difficult from the results of by-elections in the early part of the 1892-95 Parliament to see a swing in public opinion away from the minority Liberal government of W E Gladstone and towards the Unionist parties. The Liberal Unionists did greatly reduce the Liberal majority in the Luton or Southern Division of Bedfordshire on 29 September and the Conservatives gained Cirencester in October 1892 but the Liberals gained four seats from the Tories in the early months of 1893 and it was not until the middle of that year that Conservative gains began to come more regularly, prefiguring their election win in 1895.

By-election 1892: Leeds South
Party	Candidate	Votes	%	±%
Liberal	John Lawson Walton	4,414	56.0	−3.4
Conservative	Reginald Neville	3,466	44.0	+3.4
Majority		948	12.0	−6.8
Turnout		7.880	69.8	−2.1
Liberal hold		Swing	-3.4	

== See also ==
- 1908 Leeds South by-election
- List of United Kingdom by-elections
- United Kingdom by-election records
