= Morley and Rothwell =

UK Parliament constituency (1997–2010)

Coordinates: 53.749°N 1.602°W

- Former borough constituency for the House of Commons
- Boundary of Morley and Rothwell in West Yorkshire for the 2005 general election

- Location of West Yorkshire within England
- County: West Yorkshire
- Major settlements: Morley, Rothwell, Middleton

1997–2010
- Seats: One
- Created from: Morley and Leeds South
- Replaced by: Elmet and Rothwell, Morley and Outwood, Leeds Central

Morley and Rothwell was a parliamentary constituency represented in the House of Commons of the Parliament of the United Kingdom. It elected one Member of Parliament (MP) by the first past the post system of election.

== History ==
This constituency was created in 1997 and abolished in 2010. It was held for the entire period of its existence by the Labour Party.

== Boundaries ==
The City of Leeds wards of Middleton, Morley North, Morley South, and Rothwell.

The constituency covered the West Yorkshire towns of Morley and Rothwell, the villages that surround the towns, and the old pit village of Middleton.

=== Boundary review ===
Following their review of parliamentary representation in West Yorkshire, the Boundary Commission for England created a number of modified constituencies as a consequence of a falling population.

A new constituency of Elmet and Rothwell was created to move Rothwell from this seat. The successor seat to Morley and Rothwell is Morley and Outwood, which attached wards from Wakefield to the Morley area. Middleton was transferred to the Leeds Central seat.

== Members of Parliament ==
Election	Member	Party
1997	John Gunnell	Labour
2001	Colin Challen	Labour
2010	Constituency abolished: see Morley and Outwood, Elmet and Rothwell and Leeds Central	

== Elections ==
=== Elections of the 1990s ===
General election 1997: Morley and Rothwell
Party	Candidate	Votes	%	±%
Labour	John Gunnell	26,836	58.5	
Conservative	Alan Barraclough	12,086	26.3	
Liberal Democrats	Mitchell Galdas	5,087	11.1	
Referendum	David Mitchell-Innes	1,359	3.0	
BNP	Roger Wood	381	0.8	
ProLife Alliance	Pat Sammon	148	0.3	
Majority		14,750	32.2	
Turnout		45,897	67.1	
Labour win (new seat)				

=== Elections of the 2000s ===
General election 2001: Morley and Rothwell
Party	Candidate	Votes	%	±%
Labour	Colin Challen	21,919	57.0	−1.5
Conservative	David Schofield	9,829	25.6	−0.7
Liberal Democrats	Stewart Golton	5,446	14.2	+3.1
UKIP	John Bardsley	1,248	3.2	New
Majority		12,090	31.4	−0.8
Turnout		38,442	53.5	−13.6
Labour hold		Swing		

General election 2005: Morley and Rothwell
Party	Candidate	Votes	%	±%
Labour	Colin Challen	20,570	48.4	−8.6
Conservative	Nick Vineall	8,227	19.4	−6.2
Liberal Democrats	Stewart Golton	6,819	16.0	+1.8
Independent	Robert Finnigan	4,608	10.8	New
BNP	Chris Beverley	2,271	5.3	New
Majority		12,343	29.0	−2.4
Turnout		42,495	58.8	+5.3
Labour hold		Swing		

== See also ==
- List of parliamentary constituencies in West Yorkshire
