= John Gunnell =

British politician (1933–2008)

Member of Parliament for Morley and Rothwell Morley and Leeds South (1992–1997)
- In office 9 April 1992 – 14 May 2001
- Preceded by: Merlyn Rees
- Succeeded by: Colin Challen

Leader of West Yorkshire County Council
- In office 1981–1986
- Succeeded by: Council abolished

Leeds City Councillor for Hunslet Ward
- In office 1986–1992
- Preceded by: Trevor Park
- Succeeded by: Geoffrey Driver

Personal details
- Born: 1 October 1933 Birmingham
- Died: 28 January 2008 (aged 74) Wakefield
- Party: Labour
- Education: University of Leeds

William John Gunnell (1 October 1933 – 28 January 2008) was a Labour Party politician in the United Kingdom.

== Early life ==
He was born in Birmingham, and educated at King Edward's School, Birmingham. He gained a BSc in General Studies in 1955, and a PGCE in 1958 from the University of Leeds. As a conscientious objector during National Service he was a hospital porter at St Bartholomew's Hospital, London. In the 1960s he was a chemistry teacher at the United Nations International School in New York City. From 1970 to 1988 he was a Lecturer in the School of Education at the University of Leeds.

From 1977 to 1986 he was a councillor on West Yorkshire County Council, being the leader 1981–86. He was also a councillor on Leeds City Council 1986–92.

== Parliamentary career ==
Gunnell initially stood for Parliament at Leeds North East in February and October 1974, but was beaten by Sir Keith Joseph on both attempts.

At the 1992 election he was returned as Member of Parliament (MP) for Morley and Leeds South. That constituency was abolished at the 1997 election, and he was re-elected for the new Morley and Rothwell constituency. At the 2001 election he retired due to ill-health, and the seat was held for Labour by Colin Challen.

== Personal life ==
He was married with three sons and one daughter. He was a keen follower of sport, being a Member of both Yorkshire and Warwickshire County Cricket Clubs. He supported West Bromwich Albion Football Club as a child and watched most of Leeds United's home games between 1970 and 2005.

Gunnell died on 28 January 2008 in Wakefield aged 74.

Parliament of the United Kingdom
| Preceded by Merlyn Rees | Member of Parliament for Morley and Leeds South; 1992–1997 | Constituency abolished |
| New constituency | Member of Parliament for Morley and Rothwell; 1997–2001 | Succeeded by Colin Challen |
