= Marian Ramelson =

Political activist (1908–1967)

- Born: Marian Jessop; 1908; Leeds, England
- Died: 1967 (aged 58–59)
- Occupations: Writer, Historian
- Spouse: Bert Ramelson (m. 1939)
- Writing career
- Notable work: The Petticoat Rebellion: a century of struggle for women's rights

Marian Ramelson (1908–1967) was a 20th-century communist, political activist and historian. Ramelson was the first British representative to greet the People’s Republic of China after its establishment in 1949. Ramelson wrote The Petticoat Rebellion: a century of struggle for women's rights concerning the suffrage movement published in 1967.

== Biography ==
Marian Jessop was born in 1908 in Leeds, to parents Thomas Austin Jessop, an engine fitter, and Ethel Jessop, née Wilson. Her father was a socialist and trade unionist, and served as a Leeds city councillor and was lord mayor in 1956. He supported women's suffrage, and his activism influenced Ramelson in her own political views.

She joined the Communist Party of Great Britain in 1932, and was active in the Leeds Communist Party. This followed an already long involvement in trade union activities and membership of the Labour Party, and she joined CPGB after her father's experience of long spells of unemployment; hardening her resolve to end capitalism.

She served as vice-president of the local trades council in 1934 to 1935, and at this time was also secretary of Leeds May Day committee. In 1935 she attended the International Lenin School in Moscow, an official training school for key political workers operated by the Communist International, in the final British enrollment. Following the two year course, she became the Party's first woman district organizer, for West Riding. In 1938 she was promoted to the party’s central committee. Ramelson's career in the Party was inhibited because of gender politics; she was displaced as Yorkshire district secretary by a younger, less experienced man, Mick Bennett, and in 1943 lost her place on the central committee, with the role later given to her husband Bert.

It was in the Communist Party that she met her husband Bert Ramelson, to whom she gave guidance and support when he was a new member, and the couple married in 1939.

Ramelson was the first British representative to greet the new People’s Republic of China in Beijing, which has been established in 1949 by the Chinese Communist Party following the Chinese Civil War, and officially recognised by Britain in 1950. She arrived in China in December 1949 for an Asian Women's conference. In 1950 she described China in the Daily Worker; "China is free. That fact lights up the East as a blazing sun".

After meeting her at communist historians' gatherings, the historian Eric Hobsbawm described Ramelson as "marvellous and remarkable".

Ramelson is the author of The Petticoat Rebellion: a century of struggle for women's rights, a socialist, feminist history of the suffrage movement published in 1967.

She died in 1967 from cancer, following a long illness.
