= Morley and Leeds South =

UK Parliament constituency (1983–1997)

- Former borough constituency for the House of Commons
- County: West Yorkshire

1983–1997
- Seats: One
- Created from: Batley & Morley, Leeds South and Normanton
- Replaced by: Morley and Rothwell, Leeds Central

Morley and Leeds South (often known as Leeds South and Morley) was a borough constituency in West Yorkshire, which returned one Member of Parliament (MP) to the House of Commons of the Parliament of the United Kingdom from 1983 until it was abolished for the 1997 general election.

== History ==
This was a safe Labour seat during the three parliaments of its existence. The former Home Secretary Merlyn Rees was the MP from 1983 to 1992.

== Boundaries ==
The City of Leeds wards of Hunslet, Middleton, Morley North, and Morley South.

The constituency was located on the southern outskirts of the City of Leeds and included the town of Morley. The area is now more or less covered by Leeds South and Leeds South West and Morley.

== Members of Parliament ==
Election	Member	Party
1983	Merlyn Rees	Labour
1992	John Gunnell	Labour
1997	constituency abolished: see Morley and Rothwell, Leeds Central	

== Elections ==
=== Elections in the 1980s ===
General election 1983: Morley and Leeds South
Party	Candidate	Votes	%	±%
Labour	Merlyn Rees	18,995	45.9	
Conservative	William Hyde	13,141	31.8	
SDP	Peter Burley	9,216	22.3	
Majority		5,854	14.1	
Turnout		41,352	67.9	
Labour win (new seat)				

General election 1987: Morley and Leeds South
Party	Candidate	Votes	%	±%
Labour	Merlyn Rees	21,551	49.5	+3.6
Conservative	Tessa Holdroyd	14,840	34.2	+2.4
SDP	Edward Dawson	7,099	16.3	−6.0
Majority		6,711	15.3	+1.2
Turnout		43,490	71.6	+3.7
Labour hold		Swing	+0.6	

=== Elections in the 1990s ===
General election 1992: Morley and Leeds South
Party	Candidate	Votes	%	±%
Labour	John Gunnell	23,896	52.2	+2.7
Conservative	George Booth	16,524	36.1	+1.9
Liberal Democrats	Joan Walmsley	5,062	11.1	−5.2
Natural Law	Robert Thurston	327	0.7	New
Majority		7,372	16.1	+0.8
Turnout		45,809	72.5	+0.9
Labour hold		Swing	+0.4	

== See also ==
- List of parliamentary constituencies in West Yorkshire
