= Bert Ramelson =

British politician

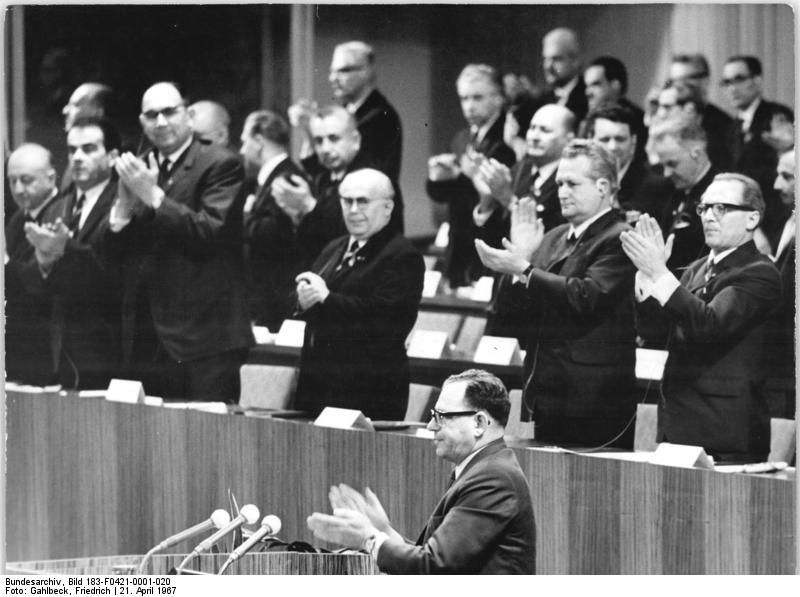
- Ramelson, in foreground
- Born: Baruch Rahmilevich Mendelson; 22 March 1910; Cherkassy, Kiev Governorate, Russian Empire (now Ukraine)
- Died: 13 April 1994 (aged 84)
- Occupation: Industrial organiser

Baruch Rahmilevich Mendelson (22 March 1910 – 13 April 1994), commonly known as Bert Ramelson, was an industrial organiser and politician for the Communist Party of Great Britain. He held the post of National Industrial Organiser from 1965 to 1977, and was editor and a member of editorial board of the World Marxist Review from 1977 to 1990.

== Early life ==
Ramelson was born the sixth of seven children in a Jewish family in Cherkassy, Russian Empire (now Ukraine), in 1910. His father was a Talmudic scholar and his mother ran a corner shop inherited from her father, which the family lived in.

In 1922 Ramelson's family emigrated to Edmonton, Alberta, Canada, where his paternal uncle was a successful fur trader. Ramelson won a scholarship to the University of Alberta, where he achieved First Class Honours in law. While he was a student he was conscripted onto an officer training course.

After completing his mandatory year in practice as an articled clerk and qualifying as a barrister, he left to join a kibbutz in Palestine. He later recalled that he became disillusioned after Histadrut called a strike on an orange grove in the kibbutz, demanding that the Arab workers be replaced by Jews.

== Wars ==
After briefly returning to Canada, he left to fight with the Canadian battalion of the International Brigades in the Spanish Civil War. He was wounded twice on the Aragon and Ebro fronts.

In 1939 he settled in Britain and for a short time was a trainee manager at Marks and Spencer.

During the Second World War he was an NCO driver in the 7th Royal Tank Regiment. In 1942 he was imprisoned by German forces after the capture of Tobruk. He organised an escape from an Italian prisoner of war camp after the Italian armistice of September 1943 and fought with the Italian Resistance. He was commissioned second lieutenant in the Royal Artillery in March 1945 and later became an acting staff captain (legal) in India. In 1983 he was interviewed about his war service by the Imperial War Museum.

== Post-war ==
After the war, he became acting full-time secretary of the Leeds branch of the Communist Party. Ramelson held this post from 1946 to 1953 and encouraged political activism within the Yorkshire mining community, working with the National Union of Mineworkers, where he mentored the young Arthur Scargill. He stood as the Communist candidate at the Leeds South by-election in 1963, where he finished in fourth place; as well as at the 1964 and 1966 general elections, consistently coming last with a mere 2-3% share of the vote.

== National Industrial Organiser ==
In 1965 Ramelson was appointed National Industrial Organiser of the Communist Party and in 1966, during the seamen's strike of 1966, he was one of a number of men accused by Labour Prime Minister Harold Wilson of being members of "a tightly knit group of politically motivated men who, as the last General Election showed, utterly failed to secure acceptance of their views by the British electorate. Some of them are now saying very blatantly that they are more concerned with harming the nation than with getting the justice we all want to see".

During his time as National Organiser Ramelson encouraged the party to forge links with trade unions such as the Transport and General Workers Union and, with a range of organisers such as Jack Jones and Ken Gill, coordinated union resistance to some of the policies of the Wilson government of the 1960s, above all Barbara Castle's proposals to reform trade union law in the White Paper In Place of Strife. Later, in the 1970s, he was a prominent opponent of incomes policies of both Conservative and Labour governments, and of the Social Contract between the trade unions and the Labour government.

The tactics implemented by Ramelson mobilised militant trades unionists to organise within the labour movement. He opposed the Industrial Relations Act 1971 and fought for the release of the Pentonville Five. In 1972 he organised flying pickets during the miners' strike. In 1973 Ramelson said: "We have more influence now on the labour movement than at any time in the life of our party. The Communist Party can float an idea early in the year. It goes to trade union conferences as a resolution and it can become official Labour Party policy by the autumn. A few years ago we were on our own, but not now."

== Personal life ==
He married his first wife Marian in 1939, whom he met in the Communist Party in Leeds. Marian Ramelson wrote Petticoat Rebellion, a work about women's rights, and was a leading activist in the Party. Marian died in 1967 and he married Joan Smith in 1970.

== Publications ==
- Incomes Policy: The Great Wage Freeze Trick
- The Middle East: crisis, causes, solution (1967)
- Keep the Unions Free (1969)
- Donovan Exposed: A Critical Analysis of the Report of the Royal Commission on Trade Unions (1968)
- Productivity Agreements: An Exposure of the Latest and Greatest Swindle on the Wages Front (1970)
- Carr's Bill and How to Kill It: A Class Analysis (1971)
- Heath's War on Your Wage Packet: The Latest Tory Attack on Living Standards and Trade Union Rights (1973)
- Smash Phase III: The Tory Fraud Exposed (1973)
- Social Contract: Cure or Con-trick? (1974)
- Bury the Social Contract: The Case for an Alternative Policy (1977)
- Consensus for Socialism (1987)

Party political offices
Preceded by Peter Kerrigan	National Industrial Organiser of the Communist Party of Great Britain; 1965–1978	Succeeded by Mick Costello
