= Leeds South =

UK Parliament constituency (1885–1983, 2024 onwards)

Coordinates: 53.78°N 1.52°W

- Borough constituency for the House of Commons
- Interactive map of boundaries since 2024
- Boundary within Yorkshire and the Humber
- County: 1885–1974: West Riding of Yorkshire; after 1974: West Yorkshire

Current constituency
- Created: 2024
- Member of Parliament: Hilary Benn (Labour)
- Seats: One
- Created from: Leeds Central; Leeds East (minor part)

1885–1983
- Seats: One
- Type of constituency: Borough constituency
- Created from: Leeds
- Replaced by: Leeds Central (Majority) and Morley & Leeds South (Part)
- During its existence contributed to new seat(s) of: Leeds South East

Leeds South is a parliamentary constituency (Note: A borough constituency (for the purposes of election expenses and type of returning officer)) in the city of Leeds, West Yorkshire, which returns one Member of Parliament (MP) to the House of Commons of the Parliament of the United Kingdom. The constituency existed from 1885 to 1983 and was recreated in 2024 following the 2023 Periodic Review of Westminster constituencies.

In the 2024 general election, the seat was won by Hilary Benn of the Labour Party, who serves as Secretary of State for Northern Ireland in the government of Keir Starmer. Benn had represented Leeds Central, the main predecessor of Leeds South, since 1999.

Leeds South was the seat of the former Leader of the Labour Party, the late Hugh Gaitskell, and the former Home Secretary Merlyn Rees.

== Constituency profile ==
Leeds South is a constituency in West Yorkshire, covering the areas of Leeds south and east of the city centre. This includes the neighbourhoods of Halton, Osmondthorpe, Burmantofts, Hunslet, Holbeck, Beeston, Belle Isle and Middleton. Leeds is one of the United Kingdom's largest cities and grew rapidly during the Industrial Revolution as a centre for textile manufacturing, especially wool. Today the city has a diverse economy and is the largest legal and financial centre in England outside of London. The southern parts of the constituency have a history of coal mining and much of the area consists of 20th-century low-income flats and council estates. Leeds South is one of the country's most deprived constituencies, with much of it falling within the top 10% most-deprived areas of England. House prices are lower than the rest of Yorkshire and less than half the national average.

On average, residents of the constituency are young and have low levels of education and homeownership. They are unlikely to work in professional occupations and household income is low. White people made up 68% of the population at the 2021 census. Black people were the largest ethnic minority group at 14% (mainly concentrated in Burmantofts) and Asians were 11% (mostly in Beeston). Most of the constituency elected Labour Party councillors at the local city council. Middleton is represented by the Social Democratic Party, the party's only local government representation in the country. An estimated 59% of voters in Leeds South supported leaving the European Union in the 2016 referendum, higher than the nationwide figure of 52%.

== History ==
The constituency was created in 1885 by the Redistribution of Seats Act 1885, and was first used in the general election of that year. Leeds had previously been represented by two MPs (1832–1868) and three MPs (1868–1885). From 1885 it was represented by five single-member constituencies: Leeds Central, Leeds East, Leeds North, Leeds South and Leeds West. The constituencies of Morley, Otley and Pudsey were also created in 1885.

The constituency was abolished for the 1983 general election. It was then split between the re-established constituency of Leeds Central, which included just over half of the seat's boundaries, and the new constituency of Morley and Leeds South, which took slightly under half of the seat's boundaries. After the 1983 general election Leeds was represented by the constituencies of Leeds Central, Leeds East, Leeds North East, Leeds North West, Leeds West and Morley and Leeds South. There were also constituencies of Elmet (created 1983) and Pudsey.

Further to the completion of the 2023 Periodic Review of Westminster constituencies, the seat was re-established for the 2024 general election, formed primarily from the (abolished) constituency of Leeds Central, but excluding the city centre, and including a small part of Leeds East and a very small part of Morley and Outwood. The notional 2019 result for the new seat was Labour.

== Boundaries ==
=== 1885–1983 ===
1885–1918: The Municipal Borough of Leeds wards of East Hunslet, South, and West Hunslet, and part of Bramley ward.

1918–1950: The County Borough of Leeds wards of Holbeck and West Hunslet, and part of New Wortley ward.

1950–1951: The County Borough of Leeds wards of Beeston, Holbeck South, Hunslet Carr and Middleton, and West Hunslet.

1951–1955: The County Borough of Leeds wards of Beeston, Holbeck, Hunslet Carr, and Middleton.

1955–1974: The County Borough of Leeds wards of Beeston, Holbeck, Hunslet Carr, and Middleton.

1974–1983: The County Borough of Leeds wards of Beeston, East Hunslet, Holbeck, Middleton, and West Hunslet.

=== 2024–present ===
The City of Leeds wards of Beeston & Holbeck, Burmantofts & Richmond Hill, Hunslet & Riverside, Middleton Park, and Temple Newsam (part).

The part ward of Temple Newsam was transferred from Leeds East, with the bulk of the remainder comprising approximately 72% of the electorate of the abolished Leeds Central seat.

Leeds South saw one of the lowest turnouts of any constituency at the 2024 election, with just 42% of eligible voters casting a ballot.

== Members of Parliament ==
=== MPs 1885–1983 ===
Leeds prior to 1885

Election	Member	Party	Notes
1885	Lyon Playfair	Liberal	Member for Edinburgh and St Andrews Universities (1868–1885); Elevated to the peerage as Baron Playfair in September 1892
1892 by-election	John Lawson Walton	Liberal	Attorney General for England and Wales (1905–1908), Died January 1908
1908 by-election	William Middlebrook	Liberal	
1916	William Middlebrook	Coalition Liberal	
Jan 1922	William Middlebrook	National Liberal	
Nov 1922	Henry Charleton	Labour	
1931	Noel Whiteside	Conservative	
1935	Henry Charleton	Labour	
1945	Hugh Gaitskell	Labour	Minister of Fuel and Power (1947–1950); Secretary of State for Economic Affairs (1950); Chancellor of the Exchequer (1950–1951); Shadow Chancellor of the Exchequer (1951–1955); Leader of the Labour Party (1955–1963), Died January 1963
1963 by-election	Merlyn Rees	Labour	Shadow Secretary of State for Northern Ireland (1972–1974); Secretary of State for Northern Ireland (1974–1979); Home Secretary (1976–1979); Contested Morley & Leeds South following redistribution
1983	Constituency abolished		

=== MPs since 2024 ===
Leeds Central prior to 2024

Election	Member	Party
2024	Hilary Benn	Labour

== Elections ==
=== Elections in the 2020s ===
General election 2024: Leeds South
Party	Candidate	Votes	%	±%
Labour	Hilary Benn	17,117	54.0	−4.4
Green	Ed Carlisle	5,838	18.4	+14.6
Conservative	Karen Cooksley	4,172	13.2	−13.1
SDP	Daniel Whetstone	1,874	5.9	+5.3
Liberal Democrats	George Sykes	1,340	4.2	−0.2
Workers Party	Muhammad Azeem	719	2.3	New
CPA	Janet Bickerdike	341	1.1	New
Independent	Niko Omilana	277	0.9	New
Majority		11,279	35.6	+3.5
Turnout		31,678	41.7	−16.2
Registered electors		75,953		
Labour hold		Swing	−9.5	

=== Elections in the 2010s ===
2019 notional result
Party	Vote	%
Labour	25,263	58.4
Conservative	11,377	26.3
Brexit Party	2,771	6.4
Liberal Democrats	1,922	4.4
Green	1,635	3.8
Others	281	0.6
Turnout	43,249	57.9
Electorate	74,726	

== Election results 1885–1983 ==
=== Elections in the 1880s ===
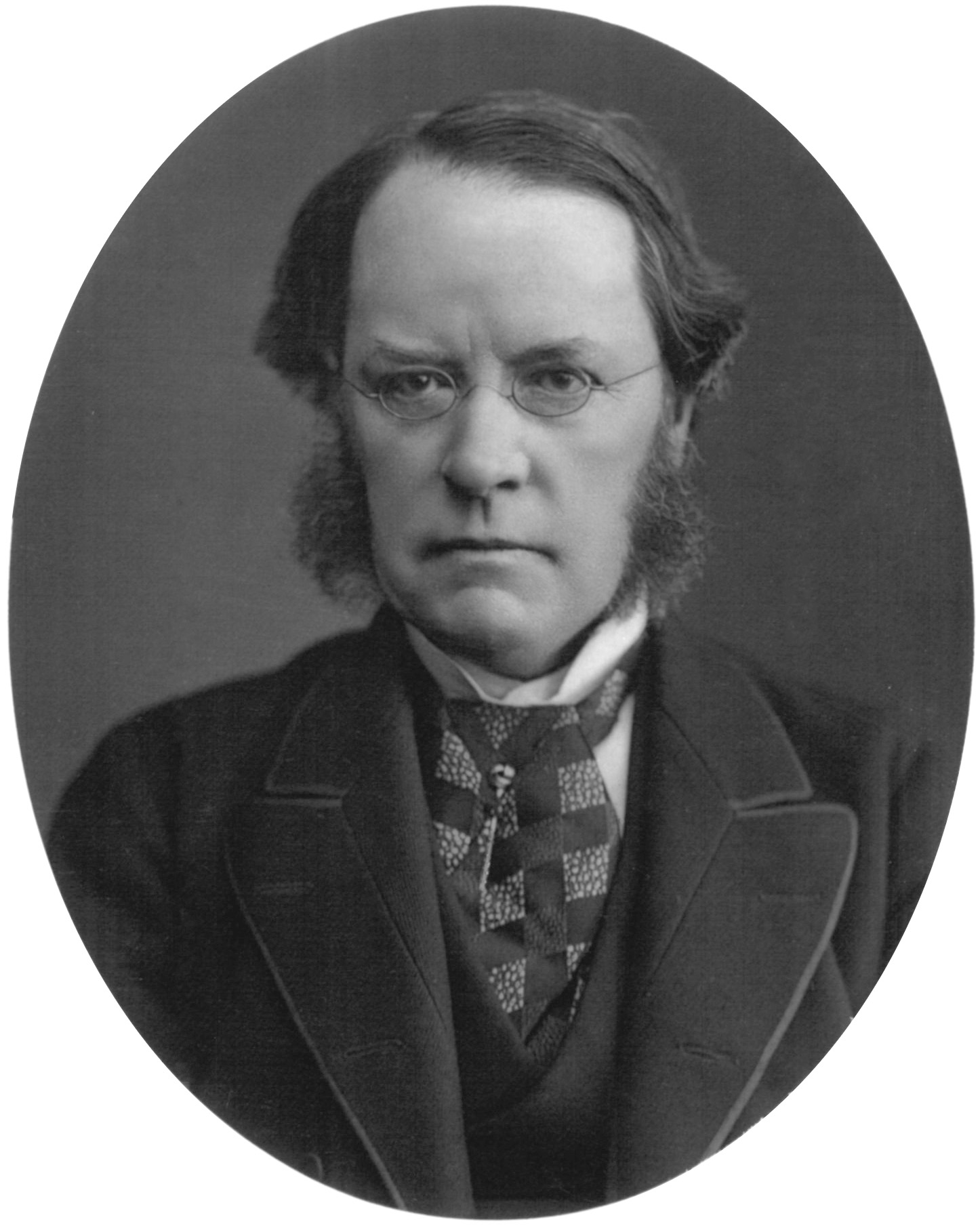
Lyon Playfair

General election 1885: Leeds South
Party	Candidate	Votes	%
Liberal	Lyon Playfair	5,208	64.5
Conservative	Stuart Cunningham Macaskie	2,869	35.5
Majority		2,339	29.0
Turnout		8,077	73.9
Registered electors		10,931	
Liberal win (new seat)			

Playfair was appointed Vice-President of the Committee of the Council on Education, requiring a by-election.

1886 Leeds South by-election
Party	Candidate	Votes	%	±%
Liberal	Lyon Playfair	Unopposed		
Registered electors				
Liberal hold				

General election 1886: Leeds South
Party	Candidate	Votes	%	±%
Liberal	Lyon Playfair	4,665	61.5	−3.0
Conservative	Thomas Hirst Bracken	2,924	38.5	+3.0
Majority		1,741	23.0	−6.0
Turnout		7,589	69.4	−4.5
Registered electors		10,931		
Liberal hold		Swing	−3.0	

=== Elections in the 1890s ===
Walton

General election 1892: Leeds South
Party	Candidate	Votes	%	±%
Liberal	Lyon Playfair	4,829	59.4	−2.1
Conservative	Reginald Neville	3,294	40.6	+2.1
Majority		1,535	18.8	−4.2
Turnout		8,123	71.9	+2.5
Registered electors		11,290		
Liberal hold		Swing	−2.1	

1892 Leeds South by-election
Party	Candidate	Votes	%	±%
Liberal	John Walton	4,414	56.0	−3.4
Conservative	Reginald Neville	3,466	44.0	+3.4
Majority		948	12.0	−6.8
Turnout		7,880	69.8	−2.1
Registered electors		11,290		
Liberal hold		Swing	−3.4	

- Caused by Playfair's elevation to the peerage.

General election 1895: Leeds South
Party	Candidate	Votes	%	±%
Liberal	John Walton	4,608	47.6	−11.8
Conservative	Reginald Neville	4,447	46.0	+5.4
Ind. Labour Party	Alfred Shaw	622	6.4	New
Majority		161	1.6	−17.2
Turnout		9,677	81.2	+9.3
Registered electors		11,921		
Liberal hold		Swing	−8.6	

=== Elections in the 1900s ===
General election 1900: Leeds South
Party	Candidate	Votes	%	±%
Liberal	John Walton	4,952	51.2	+3.6
Conservative	Reginald Neville	4,718	48.8	+2.8
Majority		234	2.4	+0.8
Turnout		9,670	71.9	−9.3
Registered electors		13,442		
Liberal hold		Swing	+0.4	

Walton

General election 1906: Leeds South
Party	Candidate	Votes	%	±%
Liberal	John Walton	6,200	50.2	−1.0
Labour Repr. Cmte.	Albert E. Fox	4,030	32.6	New
Conservative	Henry Cameron-Ramsay-Fairfax-Lucy	2,126	17.2	−31.6
Majority		2,170	17.6	+15.2
Turnout		12,356	81.7	+9.8
Registered electors		15,119		
Liberal hold		Swing	+15.3	

Middlebrook

1908 Leeds South by-election
Party	Candidate	Votes	%	±%
Liberal	William Middlebrook	5,274	41.7	−8.5
Conservative	Reginald Neville	4,915	38.9	+21.7
Labour	Albert E. Fox	2,451	19.4	−13.2
Majority		359	2.8	−14.8
Turnout		12,640	82.5	+0.8
Registered electors		15,321		
Liberal hold		Swing	+2.4	

=== Elections in the 1910s ===
General election January 1910: Leeds South
Party	Candidate	Votes	%	±%
Liberal	William Middlebrook	8,969	67.3	+17.1
Conservative	William Nicholson	4,366	32.7	+15.5
Majority		4,603	34.6	+17.0
Turnout		13,335	84.8	+3.1
Registered electors				
Liberal hold		Swing	+15.9	

General election December 1910: Leeds South
Party	Candidate	Votes	%	±%
Liberal	William Middlebrook	6,064	48.2	−19.1
Conservative	William Nicholson	3,804	30.3	−2.4
Labour	John Badlay	2,706	21.5	New
Majority		2,260	17.9	−16.7
Turnout		12,574	80.0	−4.8
Registered electors				
Liberal hold		Swing		

General Election 1914–15:

Another General Election was required to take place before the end of 1915. The political parties had been making preparations for an election to take place and by July 1914, the following candidates had been selected;

- Liberal: William Middlebrook
- Unionist:
- Labour:

Middlebrook

General election 1918: Leeds South
Party		Candidate	Votes	%
C	National Liberal	William Middlebrook	10,609	60.6
	Labour	Frank Fountain	5,510	31.5
	Independent	James Brook*	1,377	7.9
Majority			5,099	29.1
Turnout			17,496	48.8
Registered electors			35,843	
	National Liberal win (new boundaries)			
C indicates candidate endorsed by the coalition government.

* Brook was supported by the three local branches of National Association of Discharged Sailors and Soldiers, National Federation of Discharged and Demobilized Sailors and Soldiers and Comrades of the Great War.

=== Elections in the 1920s ===
General election 1922: Leeds South
Party	Candidate	Votes	%	±%
Labour	Henry Charleton	13,210	53.7	+22.2
National Liberal (Unionist)	William Middlebrook	11,380	46.3	−14.4
Majority		1,830	7.4	N/A
Turnout		24,590	69.8	+20.9
Registered electors		35,252		–591
Labour gain from National Liberal		Swing	+18.3	

General election 1923: Leeds South
Party	Candidate	Votes	%	±%
Labour	Henry Charleton	11,705	44.2	−9.5
Unionist	Reginald Neville	7,679	29.0	New
Liberal	Granville Gibson	7,083	26.8	−19.5
Majority		4,026	15.2	+7.8
Turnout		26,467	74.1	+4.3
Registered electors		35,719		+467
Labour hold		Swing	–19.3	

General election 1924: Leeds South
Party	Candidate	Votes	%	±%
Labour	Henry Charleton	12,799	46.4	+2.1
Unionist	Graham Ford	11,008	39.9	+10.9
Liberal	Frank Geary	3,801	13.8	−13.0
Majority		1,791	6.4	−8.7
Turnout		27,608	76.5	+2.4
Registered electors		36,085		+366
Labour hold		Swing	−4.4	

General election 1929: Leeds South
Party	Candidate	Votes	%	±%
Labour	Henry Charleton	18,043	52.5	+6.2
Unionist	Graham Ford	9,433	27.5	−12.4
Liberal	Ernest Scott	6,884	20.0	+6.3
Majority		8,610	25.1	+18.6
Turnout		34,360	76.2	−0.3
Registered electors		45,084		+8,999
Labour hold		Swing	+9.3	

=== Elections in the 1930s ===
General election 1931: Leeds South
Party	Candidate	Votes	%	±%
Conservative	Noel Whiteside	14,881	42.1	+14.7
Labour	Henry Charleton	14,156	40.1	–12.4
Liberal	Frederick Boult	6,291	17.8	–2.2
Majority		725	2.1	N/A
Turnout		35,328	77.6	+1.3
Registered electors		45,548		+464
Conservative gain from Labour		Swing	+13.6	

General election 1935: Leeds South
Party	Candidate	Votes	%	±%
Labour	Henry Charleton	15,223	46.0	+6.0
Conservative	Noel Whiteside	14,207	43.0	+0.8
Social Credit	Wilfred Townend	3,642	11.0	New
Majority		1,016	3.1	N/A
Turnout		33,072	73.7	–3.9
Registered electors		44,886		–662
Labour gain from Conservative		Swing	+2.6	

General Election 1939–40:

Another General Election was required to take place before the end of 1940. The political parties had been making preparations for an election to take place and by the Autumn of 1939, the following candidates had been selected;

- Labour: Hugh Gaitskell
- Conservative: Donald Kaberry
- Liberal: J. Alun Williams
- British Union: John Angus Macnab

=== Elections in the 1940s ===
General election 1945: Leeds South
Party	Candidate	Votes	%	±%
Labour	Hugh Gaitskell	17,899	61.0	+15.0
Conservative	Arthur Ramsden	7,497	25.6	–17.4
Liberal	William Barford	3,933	13.4	New
Majority		10,402	35.5	+32.4
Turnout		29,329	75.3	+1.6
Registered electors		38,970		–5,916
Labour hold		Swing	+16.2	

=== Elections in the 1950s ===
General election 1950: Leeds South
Party	Candidate	Votes	%
Labour	Hugh Gaitskell	29,795	61.1
Conservative	Bernard Wood	14,436	29.6
Liberal	Edgar Meeks	4,525	9.3
Majority		15,359	31.5
Turnout		48,756	84.6
Registered electors		57,625	
Labour win (new boundaries)			

General election 1951: Leeds South
Party	Candidate	Votes	%	±%
Labour	Hugh Gaitskell	30,712	65.1	+4.0
Conservative	Winifred Brown	16,493	34.9	+5.3
Majority		14,219	30.1	–1.4
Turnout		47,205	82.2	–2.4
Registered electors		57,436		–189
Labour hold		Swing	–0.7	

General election 1955: Leeds South
Party	Candidate	Votes	%	±%
Labour	Hugh Gaitskell	25,833	65.2	+0.1
Conservative	Winifred Brown	13,817	34.8	–0.1
Majority		12,016	30.3	+0.2
Turnout		39,650	72.9	–9.3
Registered electors		54,424		–3,012
Labour hold		Swing	+0.1	

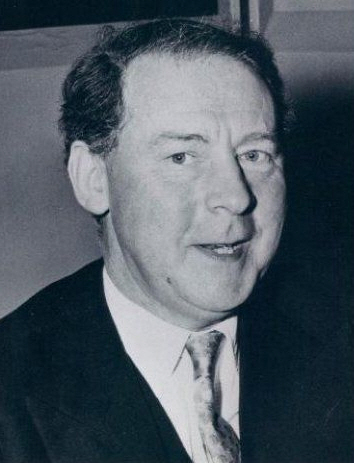
Hugh Gaitskell

General election 1959: Leeds South
Party	Candidate	Votes	%	±%
Labour	Hugh Gaitskell	24,442	58.6	−6.6
Conservative	John Addey	12,956	31.0	−3.8
Liberal	John Meeks	4,340	10.4	New
Majority		11,486	27.6	−2.8
Turnout		41,738	78.9	+6.1
Registered electors		52,882		–1,542
Labour hold		Swing	–1.4	

=== Elections in the 1960s ===
1963 Leeds South by-election
Party	Candidate	Votes	%	±%
Labour	Merlyn Rees	18,785	62.9	+4.4
Conservative	John Udal	5,996	20.1	−11.0
Liberal	Brian Walsh	4,399	14.7	+4.3
Communist	Bert Ramelson	670	2.2	New
Majority		12,789	42.8	+15.3
Turnout		29,850	60.5	–18.4
Registered electors		49,313		–3,569
Labour hold		Swing	+7.7	

General election 1964: Leeds South
Party	Candidate	Votes	%	±%
Labour	Merlyn Rees	22,339	63.1	+4.6
Conservative	Percival Woodward	12,123	34.3	+3.2
Communist	Bert Ramelson	928	2.6	N/A
Majority		10,997	28.9	+1.3
Turnout		35,390	72.0	–6.9
Registered electors		49,151		–3,731
Labour hold		Swing	+0.7	

General election 1966: Leeds South
Party	Candidate	Votes	%	±%
Labour	Merlyn Rees	23,171	68.8	+5.6
Conservative	Percival Woodward	9,813	29.1	–5.1
Communist	Bert Ramelson	714	2.1	–0.5
Majority		13,358	39.6	+10.8
Turnout		33,698	68.1	–3.9
Registered electors		49,474		+323
Labour hold		Swing	+5.4	

=== Elections in the 1970s ===
General election 1970: Leeds South
Party	Candidate	Votes	%	±%
Labour	Merlyn Rees	19,536	59.8	–8.9
Conservative	Gavin Macpherson	9,311	28.5	–0.6
Liberal	Stephen Cooksey	3,810	11.7	New
Majority		10,225	31.3	–8.3
Turnout		32,657	66.0	–2.1
Registered electors		49,490		+16
Labour hold		Swing	–4.2	

1970 notional result
Party	Vote	%
Labour	22,300	61.6
Conservative	9,800	27.1
Liberal	4,100	11.3
Turnout	36,200	65.4
Electorate	55,334	

General election February 1974: Leeds South
Party	Candidate	Votes	%	±%
Labour	Merlyn Rees	21,365	55.2	–6.4
Liberal	Denis Pedder	9,505	24.6	+13.2
Conservative	Peter Harmer	7,810	20.2	–6.9
Majority		11,860	30.7	–3.9
Turnout		38,680	73.9	+8.5
Registered electors		52,326		–3,008
Labour hold		Swing	–9.8	

General election October 1974: Leeds South
Party	Candidate	Votes	%	±%
Labour	Merlyn Rees	21,653	64.4	+9.2
Conservative	Thomas Stow	6,388	19.0	–1.2
Liberal	John Adams	5,563	16.6	–8.0
Majority		15,265	45.4	+14.8
Turnout		33,604	63.8	–10.1
Registered electors		52,689		+363
Labour hold		Swing	+5.2	

General election 1979: Leeds South
Party	Candidate	Votes	%	±%
Labour	Merlyn Rees	22,388	65.0	+0.6
Conservative	R. Ratcliffe	8,058	23.4	+4.4
Liberal	F. Hurst	3,568	10.4	–6.2
National Front	B. Spink	416	1.2	New
Majority		14,330	41.62	–3.8
Turnout		35,430	68.7	+4.9
Registered electors		50,119		–2,570
Labour hold		Swing	–1.9	

== See also ==
- List of parliamentary constituencies in West Yorkshire
- List of parliamentary constituencies in the Yorkshire and the Humber (region)

== Notes ==
Parliament of the United Kingdom
Preceded by Bristol South East	Constituency represented by the chancellor of the Exchequer; 1950–1951	Succeeded by Saffron Walden
Preceded by Lewisham South	Constituency represented by the leader of the opposition 1955–1963	Succeeded by Belper
