= 1963 Leeds South by-election =

UK Parliamentary by-election

← 1959	20 June 1963	1964 →

Constituency of Leeds South
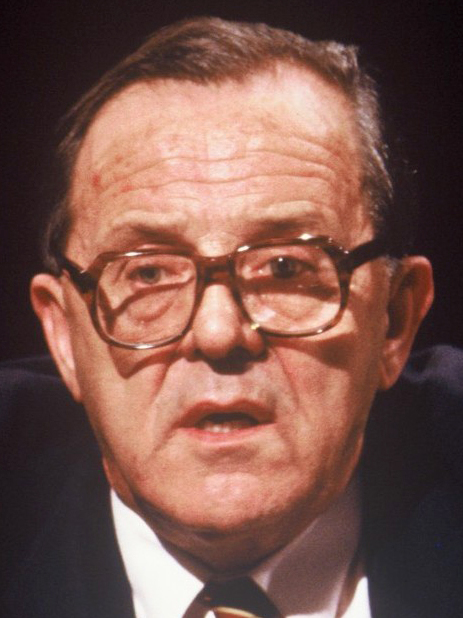
	First party	Second party	Third party
		Con	Lib
Candidate	Merlyn Rees	John Udal	Brian Walsh
Party	Labour	Conservative	Liberal
Popular vote	18,785	5,996	4,399
Percentage	62.93%	20.09%	14.74%
Swing	▲4.37%	▼10.95%	▲4.34%
MP before election
Hugh Gaitskell
Labour
Subsequent MP
Merlyn Rees
Labour

The 1963 Leeds South by-election was held on Thursday 20 June 1963. It was held due to the death of the incumbent MP and Leader of the Labour Party, Hugh Gaitskell. The by-election was won by the Labour candidate, Merlyn Rees who would later become a Cabinet minister.

Leeds South by-election, 1963
Party	Candidate	Votes	%	±%
Labour	Merlyn Rees	18,785	62.93	+4.37
Conservative	John Udal	5,996	20.09	−10.95
Liberal	Brian Walsh	4,399	14.74	+4.34
Communist	Bert Ramelson	670	2.24	New
Majority		12,789	42.84	+15.32
Turnout		29,850		
Labour hold		Swing		
