= Reginald Neville =

British barrister and Member of Parliament

Sir Reginald James Neville Neville, 1st Baronet (22 February 1863 – 28 April 1950), born Reginald Neville White, was a British barrister and Conservative and Unionist Member of Parliament. He was created a baronet in 1927.

== Background and education ==
Reginald James Neville White was the elder son of James Sewell White, a barrister who became a Judge of the High Court of Calcutta, in India and who took the name Neville by Royal Licence in 1885. While the family seat was at Sloley Hall (Note: Stands: see Historic England. "Details from listed building database (1049170)". National Heritage List for England.), Sloley, Norfolk, he was born in Bombay, British India, in 1863. He was later educated at Clifton College, Charterhouse School where he was a Scholar, and at Trinity College, Cambridge, where he won the Winchester Reading Prize.

== Legal and political career ==
Neville was called to the bar, Inner Temple, in 1887, following in his father's footsteps. He was appointed as Recorder, or part-time judge, of Bury St Edmunds in 1905, a position he held until 1943. In 1892 he first stood for parliament, contesting South Leeds, where he continued as the Conservative and Unionist candidate at the general elections of 1895 and 1900, and at a by-election in 1908. At the January 1910 election, he stood unsuccessfully in Wigan, but was finally elected as a Unionist Member of Parliament for Wigan at the second 1910 election, gaining the seat from a Labour member. He lost this seat back to the Labour Party in December 1918 (a so-called "Khaki election"), and in 1923 stood unsuccessfully in South Leeds again, meeting his fifth defeat there. He was then selected as Unionist candidate for East Norfolk, where he was successful at the 1924 election, holding the seat until 1929. In that year he became a liveryman of the Worshipful Company of Bowyers.

In the 1927 Birthday Honours, Neville was created a Baronet (Note: of Sloley in the County of Norfolk - see territorial designation) He was a member of the Carlton Club and the United University Club. He was Master of the Worshipful Company of Bowyers of the City of London 1928 to 1930.

== Personal life ==
Neville died in April 1950, aged 87. He was succeeded in the baronetcy by his elder son, Lieutenant-Colonel Sir James Edmund Henderson Neville, 2nd Baronet MC, author of The War Letters of a Light Infantryman (1931), who also wrote under the pen-name of 'Gaid Sakit'.

== Arms ==
Coat of arms of Reginald Neville
Crest An eagle displayed Sable on the breast and upon each wing an escutcheon Or charged with a lion’s head erased also Sable. Escutcheon Sable a chevron invected Vair between three lions rampant Or holding between the paws an escutcheon Argent charged with an eagle’s head erased Azure.

== Notes and references ==
Notes

Parliament of the United Kingdom
Preceded by Henry Twist	Member of Parliament for Wigan; 1910–1918	Succeeded by John Parkinson
Preceded by Hugh Seely	Member of Parliament for East Norfolk; 1924–1929	Succeeded by Viscount Elmley
Baronetage of the United Kingdom
New creation	Baronet of Sloley; 1927–1950	Succeeded by James Neville
