= United Kingdom general election records =

United Kingdom general elections occur at least every five years. About 650 constituencies return a member of Parliament. Prior to 1945, electoral competition in the United Kingdom exhibited features which make meaningful comparisons with modern results difficult. Hence, unless otherwise stated, records are based on results since the 1945 general election, and earlier exceptional results are listed separately.

== Glossary ==
For comparison purposes the following definitions have been adopted.

- Gain – victory by a party which was not victorious at the immediate previous election.
- Loss – defeat of a party which was victorious at the immediate previous election.
- Hold – victory by a party which was victorious at the immediate previous election.
- Win – victory by a party. Ambiguous term that could mean either a gain or a hold.
- Incumbent – the party which held the seat at the immediate previous election, irrespective of any intervening change of candidate or candidate's change of party.
- Major party – A party that has a realistic chance of leading government. Since 1945, every UK government has been led by the Conservatives or Labour. Parties in electoral pacts whose members take the whip of a major party and have no de facto independence are also counted as part of the major parties. For Labour, this includes the Co-operative Party. For the Conservatives, this includes the Unionist Party and the National Liberal Party. In Northern Ireland the situation is more fluid, but both the UUP and the DUP have been major parties for the unionist bloc and the Nationalist Party, the SDLP and Sinn Féin have been major parties for the nationalist bloc.
- Third party – In England, since 1922, the "third party" has been the Liberal party through its Alliance with the SDP and their successors up to the present day Liberal Democrats. Additionally, in Scotland and Wales the Scottish National Party and Plaid Cymru are also considered to be third parties. Prior to 1922, the third party was the Labour party.
- Minor party – parties smaller than the third party. In Northern Ireland, where the party landscape is unstable and many apparently independent candidates are supported by other parties, "minor party" refers to parties and independents that are not members of the main nationalist or unionist blocs.
- Uncontested – an election where only one candidate is put forward. No votes are actually cast and the candidate is by default the victor.
- Notional – boundary changes occur about every 10–15 years. The political composition of many seats is changed as a result, sometimes decisively. Professors Colin Rallings and Michael Thrasher have compiled notional results for the last few sets of boundary changes, predicting what the result would have been at the previous election under the new boundaries.

== Numerical records ==
For more information about what is meant by the term "swing", see Swing (politics)

=== National swings ===
- 1931 general election – 14.4% swing from Labour to National Government
- 1945 general election – 11.8% swing from Conservative/National Liberal to Labour
- 2024 general election – 10.8% swing from Conservative to Labour
- 1997 general election – 10.2% swing from Conservative to Labour

=== Seat swings ===
Party from	Party to	Constituency	Election	Swing	Result	Notes
Conservative	Reform UK	Clacton	2024	45.1%	Reform UK gain	(Note: Notional swing on new boundaries.)
Labour	Independent	Blyth	Feb 1974	42.3%	Independent gain	
Conservative	Liberal Democrats	North Shropshire	2024	41.3%	Liberal Democrats gain	(Note: The Liberal Democrats had won the seat previously in a by-election.)
Labour	SNP	Glasgow North East	2015	39.3%	SNP gain	
Conservative	Green	North Herefordshire	2024	32.7%	Green gain	
Conservative	Green	Waveney Valley	2024	32.1%	Green gain	
Conservative	Liberal Democrats	Chichester	2024	31.0%	Liberal Democrats gain	
Labour	Liberal Democrats	Brent East	2005	29%	Liberal Democrats gain	
Liberal Democrats	Labour	Brent Central	2015	28.3%	Labour gain	
Labour	Green	Bristol Central	2024	28.2%	Green gain	
SNP	Labour	Alloa and Grangemouth	2024	26.6%	Labour gain	
Conservative	Labour	South West Norfolk	2024	26.2%	Labour gain	
SNP	Conservative	Gordon	2017	20.4%	Conservative gain	
Labour	Conservative	Bassetlaw	2019	18.4%	Conservative gain	
Liberal Democrats	Conservative	North Norfolk	2019	17.5%	Conservative gain	
Liberal Democrats	SNP	Gordon	2015	14.4%	SNP gain	
Conservative	SNP	Perth and East Perthshire	October 1974	11%	SNP gain	

=== Largest fall in percentage share of vote ===
A party's share of the vote at a general election is not always matched at subsequent general elections, but given the five-year maximum term of a Parliament since 1911, reductions of 10% or more (on the national level) or around 30% or more (in individual constituencies) are unusual.

==== National ====
Decrease ▼	Party	Election
19.9	Conservative	2024
15.1	Liberal Democrats	2015
11.9	Liberal	1924
11.6	Conservative	1945
11.3	Conservative	1997
10.8	UKIP	2017
9.3	Labour	1983
7.9	Labour	2019

==== Constituency ====
Decrease ▼	Party	Constituency	Election
65.1	Irish Parliamentary	West Mayo	1918
60.6	Ind. Labour Party	Glasgow Bridgeton	1950
53.1	UUP	North Down	1979
45.8	Labour	Merthyr Tydfil	1970
45.7	Labour	Blyth	1974 Feb (Note: New boundaries were in place for the election.)
44.0	Conservative	Clacton	2024
43.4	Conservative	South West Norfolk	2024
43.0	Conservative	Boston and Skegness	2024
41.5	UUP	North Antrim	1970
41.2	Conservative	Great Yarmouth	2024
40.5	Conservative	South Basildon and East Thurrock	2024
39.8	UUP	Belfast North	2001
39.7	Labour	Blaenau Gwent	2005
39.7	Conservative	North Shropshire	2024
39.3	Labour	Blackburn	2024
38.6	Conservative	Amber Valley	2024
38.4	Conservative	Castle Point	2024
37.9	Conservative	South Holland and the Deepings	2024
37.4	Ind. Labour Party	Merthyr	1935
36.8	UKIP	Clacton	2017
36.2	Labour	Dewsbury and Batley	2024
36.0	Conservative	Basildon and Billericay	2024
35.9	Conservative	Rayleigh and Wickford	2024
35.8	Liberal Democrats	Brent Central	2015
35.0	UUP	Lagan Valley	2005
34.7	Respect	Bradford West	2015
34.7	Labour	Glasgow North East	2015
34.5	Labour	West Dunbartonshire	2015
34.1	Labour	Leicester South	2024
33.9	Labour	Birmingham Perry Barr	2024
33.7	Conservative	Eccles	1922
33.4	Conservative	Maldon	2024
33.0	Ind. Labour Party	Glasgow Shettleston	1950
32.7	Labour	Coatbridge, Chryston and Bellshill	2015
32.4	Conservative	North East Cambridgeshire	2024
31.9	Conservative	Waveney Valley	2024
31.7	Labour	Glenrothes	2015
31.6	Sinn Féin	Fermanagh and South Tyrone	1959
31.5	Conservative	North Herefordshire	2024
31.2	Labour	Kirkcaldy and Cowdenbeath	2015
31.2	Liberal Democrats	Sheffield Central	2015
31.1	Liberal Democrats	Dunfermline and West Fife	2015
31.0	Conservative	Ashfield	2024
30.8	Conservative	Westmorland and Lonsdale	2024
30.5	Conservative	Ashford	2024
30.5	Liberal Democrats	Hereford and South Herefordshire	2015
30.5	Democratic Labour	Lincoln	1979
30.3	Liberal Democrats	Edinburgh South	2015
30.0	UUP	North Down	2010

==== Other parties ====
The Scottish National Party and Democratic Unionist Party have never lost 30% or more of the vote in a single constituency.

Decrease ▼	Party	Constituency	Election
27.0	NI Conservatives	North Down	1997
26.0	SNP	Western Isles	1987
25.3	DUP	Belfast West	1979

=== Largest increase in percentage share of vote ===
These records detail the change in the share of the vote by parties when compared to the same constituency in the previous general election. In some cases, such as Brent East in 2005 for the Liberal Democrats, the figures should be framed by the context of a by-election in that constituency between the two elections.

Increase ▲	Party	Constituency	Election
74.1	Labour	Glasgow Gorbals	1945 (Note: The Labour candidate George Buchanan, had held the seat as an Independent Labour candidate with 75% of the vote at the previous election, while the official Labour candidate had less than 6%.)
43.9	SNP	Glasgow North East	2015
43.8	Liberal	Dundee West	1951
42.9	Liberal Democrats	North Shropshire	2024 (Note: The seat had been won by the Liberal Democrats in a by-election; their vote share increased by 5.7% between the by-election and the 2024 election.)
41.3	DUP	Lagan Valley	2005
41.2	SNP	Glasgow North	2015
40.8	SNP	Glasgow South West	2015
39.8	SNP	Coatbridge, Chryston and Bellshill	2015
39.6	SNP	Dunfermline and West Fife	2015
39.3	SNP	Glasgow North West	2015
38.9	SNP	West Dunbartonshire	2015
38.3	SNP	Motherwell and Wishaw	2015
38.2	SNP	Glenrothes	2015
37.9	SNP	Kirkcaldy and Cowdenbeath	2015
37.6	SNP	Inverclyde	2015
36.9	Liberal Democrats	Brent East	2005
36.5	SNP	Rutherglen and Hamilton West	2015
36.1	SNP	Cumbernauld, Kilsyth and Kirkintilloch East	2015
36.1	Labour	Glasgow Shettleston	1950
35.9	Alliance	North Down	2019
35.9	Liberal Democrats	Honiton and Sidmouth	2024
35.0	SNP	Glasgow Central	2015
34.7	SNP	Glasgow South	2015
34.2	SNP	Aberdeen North	2015
34.1	SNP	Central Ayrshire	2015
33.9	Green	North Herefordshire	2024
33.0	SNP	Dundee West	2015
33.0	SNP	Ross, Skye and Lochaber	2015
32.8	SNP	Paisley and Renfrewshire South	2015
32.6	SNP	East Kilbride, Strathaven and Lesmahagow	2015
32.4	Green	Waveney Valley	2024
32.2	SNP	Glasgow East	2015
31.7	SNP	East Renfrewshire	2015
31.7	SNP	Paisley and Renfrewshire North	2015
31.6	UUP	Fermanagh and South Tyrone	1959
31.4	SNP	Inverness, Nairn, Badenoch and Strathspey	2015
31.3	Labour	East Renfrewshire	2024
31.3	SNP	Edinburgh North and Leith	2015
31.3E	SDLP	Belfast South	2019
31.0	SNP	Livingston	2015
30.9	Labour	Falkirk	2024
30.8	SNP	Ayr, Carrick and Cumnock	2015
30.8	SNP	Edinburgh South West	2015
30.6	SNP	Dundee East	1974 Feb
30.6	Green	Bristol Central	2024
30.4	SNP	Airdrie and Shotts	2015
30.3	Labour	Bristol West	2017
30.0	SNP	Midlothian	2015

==== Other parties ====
Increase ▲	Party	Constituency	Election
29.6	UKIP	Heywood and Middleton	2015
29.0	Conservative	Gordon	2017
24.2	Unity	Fermanagh and South Tyrone	1970
23.7	Republican Labour	Belfast West	1966

=== Largest winning share of the vote ===
The five largest shares of the vote won by any candidate, since 1918, are as follows:

Candidate	Party	Constituency	Election	% Share
George Currie	UUP	North Down	1959	98.0
George Currie	UUP	North Down	1955	96.9
Knox Cunningham	UUP	South Antrim	1959	95.1
Phelim O'Neill	UUP	North Antrim	1959	94.9
Will Thorne	Labour	Plaistow	1918	94.9

==== Largest winning share of the vote by general election ====
Candidate	Party		Constituency	Election	% Share
Dan Carden	Labour	Labour	Liverpool Walton	2024	70.6
Dan Carden	Labour	Labour	Liverpool Walton	2019	84.7
Dan Carden	Labour	Labour	Liverpool Walton	2017	85.7

==== Largest number of votes ====
The largest number of votes cast for a single party nationally in a general election was 14,094,116 for the Conservatives under John Major in 1992, although this resulted in a parliamentary majority of just 21 seats.

The most votes received by a single individual in a general election was Sir Cooper Rawson who polled 75,205 votes when being reelected as MP for Brighton in 1931. Brighton was a two-member constituency with a larger than average electorate. The most votes received by an individual in a single-seat constituency was 69,762 for Reginald Blair in Hendon in 1935.

==== Largest majority ====
The largest majority received by an individual is also Sir Cooper Rawson, re-elected with a majority of 62,253 (35.2% of votes) at Brighton in 1931. The largest majority received by a woman is 38,823 (71.4% of votes) by the Countess of Iveagh elected MP for Southend in 1931.

The largest majorities received by the winning party at a general election are as follows:

Majority	Party	Election	Leader
492	National	1931	Ramsay MacDonald
209	Conservative	1924	Stanley Baldwin
179	Labour	1997	Tony Blair
174	Labour	2024	Keir Starmer
167	Labour	2001	Tony Blair
145	Labour	1945	Clement Attlee
144	Conservative	1983	Margaret Thatcher

=== Lowest winning share of the vote ===
All general election victors receiving less than 30% of the vote since 1945 onwards.

Name	Party	Constituency	Election	% Share
Alasdair McDonnell	SDLP	Belfast South	2015	24.5
Russell Johnston	Liberal Democrats	Inverness, Nairn and Lochaber	1992	26.0
Terry Jermy	Labour	South West Norfolk	2024	26.7
Frank Privett	Conservative	Portsmouth Central	1922	26.8
Adnan Hussain	Independent	Blackburn	2024	27.0
John McQuade	DUP	Belfast North	1979	27.6
Gregory Campbell	DUP	East Londonderry	2024	27.9
Jim Allister	TUV	North Antrim	2024	28.3
David Reed	Conservative	Exmouth and Exeter East	2024	28.7
Sammy Wilson	DUP	East Antrim	2024	28.9
Kevin McKenna	Labour	Sittingbourne and Sheppey	2024	29.1
Ben Lake	Plaid Cymru	Ceredigion	2017	29.2
Simon Wright	Liberal Democrats	Norwich South	2010	29.4
Steve Witherden	Labour	Montgomeryshire and Glyndŵr	2024	29.4
David Chadwick	Liberal Democrats	Brecon, Radnor and Cwm Tawe	2024	29.5
John Cooper	Conservative	Dumfries and Galloway	2024	29.6
C. W. Crook	Conservative	East Ham North	1922	29.7
Annabelle Ewing	SNP	Perth	2001	29.7
Alan Reid	Liberal Democrats	Argyll and Bute	2001	29.9

=== Lowest share of the vote ===
==== Major parties less than 1% of the vote ====
Since 1918:

% share	Candidate	Party	Constituency	Election
0.1	Paul Shea	NI Conservatives	Belfast West	2015
0.1	Hannah Westropp	NI Conservatives	South Down	2024
0.2	Samantha Rayner	NI Conservatives	Newry and Armagh	2024
0.2	Stephen Lynch	NI Conservatives	West Tyrone	2024
0.3	Lucille Nicholson	NI Conservatives	Mid Ulster	2015
0.4	Hamish Badenoch	NI Conservatives	Foyle	2015
0.4	Barry Hetherington	NI Conservatives	Strangford	2024
0.4	Robert Rigby	NI Conservatives	Newry and Armagh	2015
0.4	Amandeep Singh Bhogal	NI Conservatives	Upper Bann	2015
0.4	Claire-Louise Leyland	NI Conservatives	West Tyrone	2015
0.5	Claire Scull	NI Conservatives	East Londonderry	2024
0.6	Clare Salier	NI Conservatives	Belfast South	2017
0.7	Felicity Buchan	NI Conservatives	South Down	2015
0.7	Gary McLelland	Liberal Democrats	Glasgow East	2015
0.8	Eileen Baxendale	Liberal Democrats	Glasgow North East	2015
0.8	Karen Roberts	Liberal Democrats	Rhondda	2017
0.8	Liz St Clair-Legge	NI Conservatives	East Londonderry	2017
0.9	Flo Clucas	Liberal Democrats	West Bromwich West	2017
0.9	Ben France	Liberal Democrats	Dudley North	2017
0.9	Carol Freeman	NI Conservatives	Antrim North	2015
0.9	Brian Price	NI Conservatives	Upper Bann	1997
0.9	Cameron Sullivan	Liberal Democrats	Blaenau Gwent	2017

The Conservatives' worst vote outside Northern Ireland was 1.1% for A. Seaton in Pontypridd in 1918.

Labour's worst vote was 2.2% for Samuel McLaren in Glasgow Bridgeton in 1935 and in 2010 for Jonathan Todd in Westmorland and Lonsdale.

==== Candidates winning fewer than ten votes ====
Candidates in general elections since 1918 who won fewer than ten votes:

Votes	Candidate	Party	Constituency	Election
1	Catherine Taylor-Dawson	Vote For Yourself Rainbow Dream Ticket	Cardiff North	2005
3	Bobby Smith	Give Me Back Elmo	Maidenhead	2017
5	Martin Kyslun	Independent	West Derbyshire	2005
5	William Tobin	Independent	Uxbridge and South Ruislip	2019
7	Dorian Vanbraam	Renaissance Democrat	Putney	1997
7	Andres Mendoza	Communist League	Islington North	2017
8	Bobby Smith	Give Me Back Elmo	Uxbridge and South Ruislip	2019

Both W. M. Somerville and John Magee in Drogheda at the 1852 United Kingdom general election received no votes and George Griffith in Bewdley at the 1874 United Kingdom general election received one vote. However, in the pre-secret ballot era, some candidates stood at the hustings but for various reasons did not contest the poll, and hence could be recorded with no or few votes although in effect they were not standing. Examples include George J. Harney at Tiverton at the 1847 United Kingdom general election (no votes), William Johnston in Downpatrick at the 1857 United Kingdom general election (one vote), Humphrey Brown at the 1859 Tewkesbury by-election (no votes) and Dr Frederick R. Lees at the 1860 Ripon by-election (no votes).

=== Smallest majorities ===
Vote majority	Candidate	Party	Constituency	Election
0	John Edmund Wentworth Addison	Conservative	Ashton-under-Lyne	1886 (Note: At the election, the sitting Conservative Member, John Wentworth Addison, tied with his Liberal opponent, A.B. Rowley, on 3,049 votes each. The returning officer, acting under the law at the time, gave a casting vote to Addison, giving him an effective majority of one.)
1	Henry Duke	Conservative	Exeter	1910 (Note: At the election, the Liberal candidate, Harold St. Maur was declared elected by a majority of 4 votes, but on petition, after a lengthy hearing and several recounts at the High Court, the previous Conservative Member Henry Duke was declared elected by a single vote.)
2	Abraham Flint	National Labour	Ilkeston	1931

==== Since 1945 ====
Vote majority	Candidate	Party	Constituency	Election
2	Stephen Gethins	SNP	North East Fife	2017
2	Mark Oaten	Liberal Democrats	Winchester	1997 (Note: The 1997 general election result was declared void, and at the subsequent by-election the Liberal Democrat majority swelled to over 20,000 votes.)
3	Gwynoro Jones	Labour	Carmarthen	1974 Feb
3	Harmar Nicholls	Conservative	Peterborough	1966
4	Michelle Gildernew	Sinn Féin	Fermanagh and South Tyrone	2010
4	George Ward	Conservative	Worcester	1945
6	Eric Gandar Dower	Unionist	Caithness and Sutherland	1945
7	Derek Spencer	Conservative	Leicester South	1983
7	Dennis Hobden	Labour	Brighton Kemptown	1964
9	Paul Tyler	Liberal	Bodmin	1974 Feb
10	Peter Emery	Conservative	Reading	1964
10	Lester Hutchinson	Labour	Manchester Rusholme	1945
11	Anthony Meyer	Conservative	Eton and Slough	1964
12	Adrian Sanders	Liberal Democrats	Torbay	1997
12	John Jackson	Conservative	South East Derbyshire	1959
13	Ernle Money	Conservative	Ipswich	1970
14	Julian Amery	Conservative	Preston North	1964
15	David Pinto-Duschinsky	Labour	Hendon	2024
15	John Foster	Conservative	Northwich	1945
16	Edward Shackleton	Labour	Preston South	1951
18	Neil Duncan-Jordan	Labour	Poole	2024
19	Walter Sweeney	Conservative	Vale of Glamorgan	1992
20	Emma Dent Coad	Labour	Kensington	2017
20	Richard Holden	Conservative	Basildon and Billericay	2024
21	John Hollingworth	Conservative	Birmingham All Saints	1959
21	Ken Hargreaves	Conservative	Hyndburn	1983
21	Pete Wishart	SNP	Perth and North Perthshire	2017
22	Ian Austin	Labour	Dudley North	2017
22	Harmar Nicholls	Conservative	Peterborough	1974 Feb
22	Margaret Bain	SNP	East Dunbartonshire	1974 Oct (Note: As well as being the smallest majority at this election only 429 votes separated the top three candidates.)
25	Jack Beattie	Labour	Belfast West	1951
27	William Molloy	Labour	Ealing North	1964
27	Byron Davies	Conservative	Gower	2015
28	Walter Robert Dempster Perkins	Conservative	Stroud and Thornbury	1950
29	Robert Atkins	Conservative	Preston North	1979
30	Paul Farrelly	Labour	Newcastle-under-Lyme	2017
30	George Thompson	SNP	Galloway	1974 Oct

=== Most seats won by party (1945–present) ===
The election given is the first time they reached this number. Many of the smaller parties have had the same number of seats in numerous elections. Table is sorted by seats, and then by alphabetical order.

Seats	Party	Election	% of Seats
418	Labour	1997	63.6%
397	Conservative	1983	61.1%
72	Liberal Democrats	2024	11.1%
56	SNP	2015	8.6%
21	National Liberal	1955	3.3%
17	Liberal	1983	2.6%
12	UUP	1959	1.9%
10	DUP	2017	1.54%
8	Independent	1945	1.3%
7	Sinn Féin	2017	1.1%
6	SDP	1983	0.92%
5	Reform	2024	0.77%
4	Green	2024	0.65%
4	Plaid Cymru	1992	0.62%
4	SDLP	1992	0.62%
3	Ind. Labour Party	1945	
3	Vanguard	Feb. 1974	
2	Communist	1945	
2	Ind. Conservative	1945	
2	Independent Labour	1945	
2	Independent Liberal	1945	
2	National	1945	
2	National Independent	1945	
2	Nationalist	1945	
2	Unity	1970	
1	Alliance	2010	
1	Common Wealth	1945	
1	Democratic Labour	Feb. 1974	
1	Independent Health Concern	2001	
1	Ind. Nationalist	1951	
1	Independent Progressive	1945	
1	Ind. Republican	Oct. 1974	
1	Ind. Unionist	1979	
1	Irish Labour	1951	
1	Protestant Unionist	1970	
1	Republican Labour	1966	
1	Respect	2005	
1	TUV	2024	
1	UK Unionist	1997	
1	UKIP	2015	
1	UPUP	1983	
1	UUUP	1979	

=== Most recounts ===
- 7: Peterborough, 1966
- 7: Brighton Kemptown, 1964
- 5: Hyndburn, 1983
- 5: Carmarthen, February 1974
- 5: Ilkeston, 1931

=== Highest turnout ===
Highest turnouts in any general election since 1918:

- Fermanagh and South Tyrone, 1951: 93.4%
- Darwen, 1924: 92.7%

=== Lowest turnout ===
All turnouts below 35% from 1918 onwards:

Constituency	Election	Turnout (%)
Lambeth Kennington	1918	29.7
Birmingham Deritend	1918	30.7
Bethnal Green North East	1918	31.2
Birmingham Duddeston	1918	32.4
Limehouse	1918	33.4
Liverpool Riverside	2001	34.1
Aberdeenshire and East Kincardineshire	1918	34.2

Until 2001, the lowest turnout after 1918 was 37.4% in Orkney and Shetland in 1922.

=== Most candidates ===
Any number of candidates can be nominated for election under current UK electoral law. The only restrictions are that a candidate must be a Commonwealth or Irish citizen, not legally disqualified, with the valid nomination of ten electors from the constituency. Candidates must pay a £500 deposit which is only refunded if the candidate wins 5% or more of the votes cast.

The election with the largest number of candidates was the 2024 general election, with 4,515.

There have been 24 occasions when there were more than ten candidates on a single ballot in a general election. Large numbers of candidates are common in London seats and in the seat of the incumbent Prime Minister (marked in bold in the below list).

Candidates	Constituency	Election	Incumbent
15	Sedgefield	2005	**Tony Blair**
13	Richmond and Northallerton	2024	**Rishi Sunak**
13	Maidenhead	2017	**Theresa May**
13	Uxbridge and South Ruislip	2015	None
12	Ealing Southall	2024	None
12	Holborn and St Pancras	2024	Keir Starmer
12	Oxford East	2024	Anneliese Dodds
12	Uxbridge and South Ruislip	2019	**Boris Johnson**
12	Witney	2015	**David Cameron**
12	Hackney South and Shoreditch	2010	Meg Hillier
12	Luton South	2010	None
11	Finchley	1983	**Margaret Thatcher**
11	Isle of Wight	2010	Andrew Turner
11	Bethnal Green and Bow	2010	None
11	Camberwell and Peckham	2010	Harriet Harman
11	Bethnal Green and Bow	2015	Rushanara Ali
11	Camberwell and Peckham	2015	Harriet Harman
11	Hackney South and Shoreditch	2015	Meg Hillier
11	Thanet South	2015	None
11	Bethnal Green and Stepney	2024	Rushanara Ali
11	Cities of London and Westminster	2024	None
11	Dover and Deal	2024	None
11	Leeds North East	2024	Fabian Hamilton
11	Slough	2024	Tan Dhesi

Before 1983, the consecutive records were 6 candidates in Paddington North in 1918, 7 in Tottenham in February 1974 and 9 in Devon North in 1979.

=== Fewest candidates ===
The general election with the fewest candidates was 1931, where only 1,292 candidates stood – with the National Government, the major parties did not stand against each other in many seats. Since 1945, the election with the fewest candidates is 1951, with 1,376.

The last four seats to be uncontested at a general election were Armagh, Londonderry, North Antrim and South Antrim, at the 1951 general election. The last seats in Great Britain to be uncontested were Liverpool Scotland and Rhondda West, at the 1945 general election.

Three seats were contested only by Labour and Conservative candidates at the 1979 general election: Birmingham Handsworth, Dudley West and Salford East.

Buckingham was the only seat contested by only three candidates at the 2015 general election. Traditionally, the Speaker of the House of Commons is not opposed by major parties, so the only opposition to John Bercow was candidates from the Green Party and from UKIP. However, in the 2017 United Kingdom general election, there were 21 seats with only three candidates and in 2019 there were 20. At the 2024 general election, there were no seats with fewer than five candidates.

=== Seats changing hands ===
==== Largest number of seats changing hands ====
- 2024 general election – 303 (notional)
- 1931 general election – 289
- 1945 general election – 279
- 1922 general election – 210
- 1924 general election – 206
- 1997 general election – 185

==== Smallest number of seats changing hands ====
- 2001 general election – 27
- 1951 general election – 27
- 1955 general election – 28
- October 1974 general election – 28
- 1959 general election – 39

== Candidate records ==
=== Durable general election candidates ===
A selection of politicians who have contested seats in at least thirteen general elections are listed. Additionally, Howling Laud Hope has contested 10 general elections as of 2024, but has never won a seat.

Name	Parties	Contests	Successful	First	Last	Notes
Winston Churchill	Liberal, Conservative	16	14	1900	1959	Stood in five by-elections, first in 1899
Charles Pelham Villiers	Radical, Liberal, Liberal Unionist	15	15	1835	1895	
Kenneth Clarke	Conservative	15	13	1964	2017	
Edward Heath	Conservative	14	14	1950	1997	
T. P. O'Connor	Irish Nationalist	14	14	1885	1929	
Dennis Skinner	Labour	14	13	1970	2019	
Peter Tapsell	Conservative	14	13	1959	2010	Also stood in 1957 by-election
Gerald Kaufman	Labour	14	12	1955	2015	Did not stand 1964 or 1966
Manny Shinwell	Labour	14	12	1918	1966	Also stood in 1928 by-election
Peter Bottomley	Conservative	14	11	1974 Feb	2024	Also stood in 1975 by-election
Michael Foot	Labour	14	11	1935	1987	Also stood in 1960 by-election
David Winnick	Labour	14	10	1964	2017	Did not stand February 1974
David Lloyd George	Liberal	13	13	1892	1935	Also stood in 1890 by-election
Edward Turnour	Conservative	13	13	1906	1950	Also stood in 1904 by-election
Tony Benn	Labour	13	12	1951	1997	Stood in four by-elections, first in 1950
Margaret Beckett	Labour	13	11	1974 Feb	2019	

=== MPs defeated at consecutive general elections ===
On rare occasions, an MP has been defeated at a general election, returned at a by-election, only to be defeated again at the subsequent general election. Shirley Williams is distinguished by achieving this while in two different parties.

- George Galloway, 2010 and 2015^{b}
- William McCrea, 1997 and 2001^{a}
- Shirley Williams, 1979 and 1983
- Christopher Addison, 1931 and 1935
- Arthur Henderson, 1918, 1922 and 1923^{b}

Notes:

- ^{a} returned to Parliament at a subsequent general election
- ^{b} returned to Parliament at a subsequent by-election

=== Former MPs unsuccessful at subsequent general elections ===
==== Attempts ====
It is unusual for a defeated MP to pursue more than a couple of attempts at re-election.

- 9: Robert McIntyre, 1950, 1951, 1955, 1959, 1964, 1966, 1970, Feb 1974 and Oct 1974^{a}
- 6: Dave Nellist, 1997, 2001, 2005, 2010, 2015^{a} and 2024
- 6: George Nicholls, Dec 1910, 1918, 1922, 1923, 1924 and 1929 (and by-elections in 1913 and 1925)^{a}
- 4: Fred Maddison, Dec 1910, 1918, 1922 and 1923^{a}
- 4: Tom Howard, 1935, 1945, 1950 and 1951 (and a by-election in 1947)^{e}
- 3: Naomi Long, 2017, 2019 and 2024^{b}
- 3: Gordon Birtwistle, 2017, 2019 and 2024^{b}
- 3: Alan Reid, 2017, 2019 and 2024^{b}
- 3: Mike Carr, 1997, 2001 and 2005^{a}
- 3: Tom Mitchell, 1959, 1964 and 1966^{b}
- 3: Sydney Walter Robinson, 1929, 1931 and 1945 (and a by-election in 1926)^{a}
- 3: Maurice Alexander, 1923, 1924, 1931^{e}
- 3: Thomas Edward Wing, 1922, 1924 and 1929 (and a by-election in 1920)^{c}
- 3: Alexander Boulton, Dec 1910, 1923 and 1924^{d}

Notes:

- ^{a} in various seats
- ^{b} in the same seat
- ^{c} two previous seats and another
- ^{d} one previous seat and another
- ^{e} one previous seat and others

==== Interval ====
Attempts at a comeback usually occur almost immediately. Those who succeeded after further general elections include:

Years	Candidate	Year of defeat	Year of re-election
17	Paul Tyler	1974 October	1992
14	Dan Norris	2010	2024
13	Walter Ayles	1931	1945
13	George Isaacs	1931	1945
13	Somerville Hastings	1931	1945
13	Jennie Lee	1931	1945
13	Leah Manning	1931	1945
13	Lucy Noel-Buxton	1931	1945
13	Jonathan Evans	1997	2010

=== Future MPs unsuccessful at previous general elections ===
It is unusual for a candidate who has been unsuccessful on more than a couple of occasions to finally win a seat.

- Nigel Farage, elected for Clacton in 2024, after standing in Salisbury in 1997, Bexhill and Battle in 2001, South Thanet in 2005 and 2015, and Buckingham in 2010, as well as two by-elections.
- Alex Easton, elected for North Down in 2024, after standing in 2015, 2017, and 2019.
- Brian Mathew, elected for Melksham and Devizes in 2024, after standing in North Wiltshire in 2015, 2017 and 2019, and North Somerset in 2010.
- Daniel Zeichner, elected for Cambridge in 2015, after standing in 2010, and previously in Mid Norfolk in 2005, 2001 and 1997.
- Roger Mullin, elected for Kirkcaldy and Cowdenbeath in 2015, after standing in South Ayrshire in February 1974 and October 1974, Kirkcaldy in 1987, Paisley North in a by-election in 1990 and in 1992.
- Craig Mackinlay, elected for South Thanet in 2015, after standing in Gillingham in 1992, 1997, and 2005, and Totnes in 2001.
- David Ward, elected for Bradford East in 2010, after standing in Bradford North in 1992, 2001 and 2005 (and a by-election in 1990).
- Alasdair McDonnell, elected for Belfast South in 2005, after standing in 1979, 1983, 1987, 1992, 1997 and 2001 (and a by-election in 1982), and previously in North Antrim in 1970.
- Gregory Campbell, elected for East Londonderry in 2001, after standing in 1997, and previously in Foyle in 1983, 1987 and 1992.
- Martin McGuinness, elected for Mid Ulster in 1997, after standing in Foyle in 1983, 1987 and 1992.
- Michael Ward, elected for Peterborough in October 1974, after standing in February 1974, 1970 and 1966.
- Tommy Lewis, elected for Southampton in 1929, after standing in 1918, 1922, 1923 and 1924.
- A. E. Stubbs, elected for Cambridgeshire in 1945, after standing in 1918, 1922 and 1923, and in another constituency in 1929, 1931 and 1935.
- Frank Smith, elected for Nuneaton in 1929, after standing in 1924, and in various other constituencies in 1923, 1922, 1918, 1910, 1895 and 1892 (and also two by-elections in 1909 and one in 1894).
- Edwin Scrymgeour, elected for Dundee in 1922, after standing in January 1910, December 1910 and 1918 (and also in the 1908 and 1917 by-elections).

Among women, namely:

- Rachel Gilmour, elected for Tiverton and Minehead in 2024, after standing in Taunton Deane in 2015, Totnes in 2001 and Nottingham North in 1997.
- Vikki Slade, elected for Mid Dorset and North Poole in 2024, standing in 2015, 2017 and 2019.
- Claire Young, elected for Thornbury and Yate in 2024, standing in 2017 and 2019.
- Felicity Buchan, elected for Kensington in 2019, after previously standing in South Shields in 2017 and South Down in 2015.
- Theodora Clarke, elected for Stafford in 2019, after previously standing in Bristol East in 2017 and 2015.
- Daisy Cooper, elected for St Albans in 2019, after standing in 2017, and previously in Mid Sussex in 2015 and Suffolk Coastal in 2010.
- Dehenna Davison, elected for Bishop Auckland in 2019, after standing in Sedgefield in 2017 and Kingston upon Hull North in 2015.
- Jane Hunt, elected for Loughbrough in 2019, after standing in Nottingham South in 2017 and 2015, and Leicester East in 2010 (and also a 2011 by-election).
- Wera Hobhouse, elected for Bath in 2017, after standing in North East Somerset in 2015 and Heywood and Middleton in 2010.
- Nicky Morgan, elected for Loughborough in 2010, after standing in 2005, and previously in Islington South and Finsbury in 2001.
- Tessa Munt, elected for Wells in 2010, after standing in 2005, and previously in South Suffolk in 2001 (and also a by-election that year).
- Liz Truss, elected for South West Norfolk in 2010, after standing in Calder Valley in 2005 and Hemsworth in 2001.
- Rosie Cooper, elected for West Lancashire in 2005, after standing in Liverpool Broadgreen in 1992, Knowsley North in 1987 (and also a 1986 by-election) and Liverpool Garston in 1983.
- Ann Keen, elected for Brentford and Isleworth in 1997, after standing in 1992 and 1987.
- Siobhain McDonagh, elected for Mitcham and Morden in 1997, after standing in 1992 and 1987.
- Margaret Thatcher, elected for Finchley in 1959, after previously standing in Dartford as Margaret Roberts in 1951 and 1950.
- Barbara Ayrton-Gould, elected for Hendon North in 1945, after standing in Manchester Hulme in 1935, Northwich in 1929 and 1924, and Lambeth North in 1922.
- Grace Colman, elected for Tynemouth in 1945, after standing in Sheffield Hallam in 1935 and Hythe in 1931 and 1929.
- Jean Mann, elected for Coatbridge in 1945, after standing in West Renfrewshire in 1935 and 1931.
- Ethel Bentham, elected for Islington East in 1929, after standing in 1924, 1923 and 1922.
- Helen Shaw, elected for Bothwell in 1929, after standing in 1924 and 1923.
- Ellie Chowns, elected for North Herefordshire in 2024, after standing in 2017 and 2019.

=== Former MPs making a comeback at a general election ===
- 2024: Douglas Alexander, Heidi Alexander, Mary Creagh, Nick Dakin, James Frith, Andrew George, Stephen Gethins, Tessa Munt, Pamela Nash, Dan Norris, Melanie Onn, Jo Platt, Emma Reynolds, Gareth Snell, Anna Turley
- 2019: Caroline Ansell, James Davies, Flick Drummond, Margaret Ferrier, Richard Fuller, Jason McCartney, Karl McCartney, Anne McLaughlin, John Nicolson, Sarah Olney, Kirsten Oswald, Amanda Solloway, Owen Thompson, Edward Timpson, Craig Williams
- 2017: Vince Cable, Ed Davey, David Drew, Michelle Gildernew, Zac Goldsmith, John Grogan, Stephen Lloyd, Tony Lloyd, Esther McVey, Chris Ruane, Jo Swinson, Chris Williamson
- 2015: Boris Johnson, Joan Ryan, Dawn Butler, Rob Marris, Alex Salmond
- 2010: John Cryer, Geraint Davies, Jonathan Evans, Chris Leslie, Stephen Twigg
- 2005: David Evennett, Christopher Fraser, William McCrea, Malcolm Rifkind
- 2001: Henry Bellingham, Alistair Burt, Derek Conway, Charles Hendry, Greg Knight, Andrew Mitchell, Bob Spink
- 1997: Gerry Adams, Christopher Chope, Alan Clark, Frank Doran, Huw Edwards, Michael Fallon, Ronnie Fearn, Mike Hancock, Sylvia Heal, Gerald Howarth, Ashok Kumar, Richard Livsey, Humfrey Malins, John Maples, Francis Maude, Jonathan Sayeed, John Smith
- 1992: Michael Ancram, Bryan Davies, Warren Hawksley, John Horam, Gerry Malone, Piers Merchant, Richard Ottaway, Nick Raynsford, John Spellar, Derek Spencer, Iain Sproat, Mark Robinson, Paul Tyler
- 1987: Bob Cryer, Margaret Ewing, John Garrett, Bruce Grocott, Joan Lestor, Jim Marshall, Ann Taylor, Andrew Welsh, Audrey Wise
- 1983: Margaret Beckett, Robin Corbett, Bryan Gould, Edward Loyden, Andrew MacKay, Max Madden, Brian Sedgemore
- 1979: Michael Ancram, Sydney Chapman, David Clark, Eric Cockeram, Ednyfed Hudson Davies, Terry Davis, Dick Douglas, Peggy Fenner, Peter Griffiths, John Gummer, Barry Henderson, James Hill, John Wilkinson, David Winnick
- October 1974: Donald Anderson, Jeremy Bray, Gwynfor Evans, Robert Hicks, Evan Luard, John Mackintosh, Fergus Montgomery, Enoch Powell, Nicholas Scott, Keith Speed
- February 1974 Ronald Atkins, Gwyneth Dunwoody, John Ellis, David Ennals, Ioan Evans, Winifred Ewing, Gerald Fowler, Frank Hooley, Sydney Irving, Colin Jackson, John Lee, Eric Moonman, Stanley Newens, Christopher Price, Gwilym Roberts, Arnold Shaw, Frederick Silvester, Richard Wainwright, Alan Lee Williams, Michael Winstanley
- 1970: William Clark, Albert Cooper, Julian Critchley, Charles Curran, Patrick Duffy, Anthony Fell, Edward Gardner, Alan Glyn, Alan Green, Patricia Hornsby-Smith, Geoffrey Howe, James Kilfedder, Martin McLaren, Anthony Meyer, Peter Thomas, Richard Thompson, David Walder, Montague Woodhouse
- 1966: Richard Body, Peter Tapsell

=== Shortest-serving general election victors ===
For a comprehensive list of MPs with total service of less than 365 days see List of United Kingdom MPs with the shortest service

==== Since 1945 ====
Candidate	Party	Constituency	Year	Days
Alfred Dobbs	Labour	Smethwick	1945	1^{1}
John Sunderland	Labour	Preston	1945	122^{1}
John Whittaker	Labour	Heywood and Radcliffe	1945	137^{1}
Philip Clarke	Sinn Féin	Fermanagh and South Tyrone	1955	152^{3x}
Thomas Mitchell	Sinn Féin	Mid-Ulster	1955	152^{3x}
Barry McElduff	Sinn Féin	West Tyrone	2017	222^{4}
Harry West	UUP	Fermanagh and South Tyrone	1974 Feb	224^{2}
James Godfrey MacManaway	UUP	Belfast West	1950	238^{3}
Harry Harpham	Labour	Sheffield Brightside and Hillsborough	2015	273^{1}
Judith Chaplin	Conservative	Newbury	1992	316^{1}
Peter Law	Independent	Blaenau Gwent	2005	355^{1}

==== Pre-1945 ====
Candidate	Party	Constituency	Year	Days
Thomas Higgins	Irish Parliamentary	Galway North	1906	0^{1}
James Annand	Liberal	East Aberdeenshire	1906	16^{1}
Joseph Nicholas Bell	Labour	Newcastle East	1922	32^{1}
Harry Wrightson	Conservative	Leyton West	1918	32^{1}
Hugh Anderson	Irish Unionist	Londonderry North	1918	66^{4}
Pierce McCan	Sinn Féin	East Tipperary	1918	68^{1x}
Alexander Theodore Gordon	Unionist	Aberdeen and Kincardine Central	1918	68^{1}
Charles Mathew	Labour	Whitechapel and St. George's	1922	85^{1}
Robert Climie	Labour	Kilmarnock	1929	126^{1b}
George Henry Williamson	Conservative	Worcester	1906	128^{3}
Harold St. Maur	Liberal	Exeter	1910-11	129^{3}
John Thom	Unionist	Dunbartonshire	1931	142^{4b}
Richard Mathias	Liberal	Cheltenham	1910-11	144^{3}
George Hillman	Conservative	Wakefield	1931	144^{1}
John Barker	Liberal	Maidstone	1900	147^{3a}
Edward Clarke	Conservative	City of London	1906	150^{4b}
Frederick Guest	Liberal	East Dorset	1910	154^{3a}
Eugene O'Sullivan	Irish Parliamentary	East Kerry	1910	170^{3}
David MacDonald	Unionist	Bothwell	1918	176^{1}
Thomas Agar-Robartes	Liberal	Bodmin	1906	183^{3a}
Herbert Sparkes	Conservative	Tiverton	1922	188^{1}
Hilton Philipson	National Liberal	Berwick-on-Tweed	1922	197^{3}
Armine Wodehouse	Conservative	Saffron Walden	1900	200^{1}
Frederick Rutherfoord Harris	Conservative	Monmouth	1900	210^{3a}
Moreton Frewen	All-for-Ireland	Cork North-East	1910-11	220^{4}
Arthur Willey	Conservative	Leeds Central	1922	229^{1}
Ellis Ellis-Griffith	Liberal	Carmarthen	1923	252^{4b}
William Ward	Conservative	Wednesbury	1931	273^{5b}
Alfred Holland	Labour	Clay Cross	1935	290^{1}
Charles Harvey Dixon	Conservative	Rutland and Stamford	1922	311^{1b}
Arthur Henniker-Hughan	Unionist	Galloway	1924	340^{1}
George Spero	Labour	Fulham West	1929	341^{4b}
Martin Morris	Irish Unionist	Galway Borough	1900	342^{5}

Notes

- ^{1} died
- ^{2} defeated at next general election
- ^{3} disqualified
- ^{4} resigned
- ^{5} succeeded to the Peerage
- ^{a} returned to Parliament at a subsequent election
- ^{b} had served previously as an MP
- ^{x} elected on abstentionist tickets, and serving jail sentences at the time, so the calculated length of service is somewhat theoretical.

=== Youngest general election victors ===
- Mhairi Black, Scottish National Party, elected in 2015 aged 20 years 237 days.

==== Babies of the House elected at general elections ====
See Baby of the House of Commons

=== Youngest to leave the House ===
Name	Party	Election of Leave	Age	Notes
Thomas Teevan	UUP	1951	24	^{1}
Edward Stanley	Conservative	1918	24	^{2} (re-elected 1922)
Patrick Joseph Whitty	Irish Parliamentary	1918	24	^{2}
Henry Harrison	Irish Parliamentary	1892	24	^{1}
Stuart Donaldson	SNP	2017	25	^{1}
Arthur Evans	Liberal	1923	25	^{1} (re-elected 1924 as Conservative)
Denis Shipwright	Conservative	1923	25	^{1}
Joseph Sweeney	Sinn Féin	1922	25	^{2x}
John Esmonde	Irish Parliamentary	1918	25	^{3}
Bernadette Devlin McAliskey	Ind. Socialist	1974 Feb	26	^{1}
Jennie Lee	Labour	1931	26	^{1} (re-elected 1945)
Frank Owen	Liberal	1931	26	^{1}
Hugh Lucas-Tooth	Conservative	1929	26	^{1} (re-elected 1945)
Bryan Ricco Cooper	Irish Unionist	1910 Dec	26	^{1}
John Wodehouse	Liberal	1910 Jan	26	^{3}
Christopher Ward	Conservative	1970	27	^{1}
Liam Mellows	Sinn Féin	1922	27	^{2x}
David Reed	Labour	1974 Feb	28	^{2}
Mhairi Black	SNP	2024	29	^{3}
Nicola Richards	Conservative	2024	29	^{3}
Andrew Mackay	Conservative	1979	29	^{1} (re-elected 1983)
Michael Ancram	Conservative	1974 Oct	29	^{1} (re-elected 1979)
Margo MacDonald	SNP	1974 Feb	29	^{1}
Charles Rhys	Conservative	1929	29	^{1} (re-elected 1931)
Dehenna Davison	Conservative	2024	30	^{3}
Kirstene Hair	Conservative	2019	30	^{1}
Pamela Nash	Labour	2015	30	^{1}
Owen Carron	Sinn Féin	1983	30	^{1x}
Helene Hayman	Labour	1979	30	^{1}
John Ryan	Labour	1979	30	^{1}
Graham Tope	Liberal	1974 Feb	30	^{1}
Stanley Henig	Labour	1970	30	^{1}
John Profumo	Conservative	1945	30	^{1}
Noel Lindsay	Conservative	1935	30	^{1}
W. E. D. Allen	New Party	1931	30	^{3}
Arthur Evans	Conservative	1929	30	^{3} (re-elected 1931)
Esmond Harmsworth	Conservative	1929	30	^{3}

Notes:
^{1} Defeated
^{2} Constituency abolished
^{3} Retired
^{x} did not take his seat

=== Oldest to lose their seats ===
Age	Candidate	Party	Constituency	Election
87	Dennis Skinner	Labour	Bolsover	2019
83	David Winnick	Labour	Walsall North	2017
80	Charles William Bowerman	Labour	Deptford	1931
79	Peter Bottomley	Conservative	Worthing West	2024
77	Thomas Dyke Acland	Liberal	Wellington	1886
76	Arthur Shirley Benn	Conservative	Sheffield Park	1935
76	Frank Smith	Labour	Nuneaton	1931
76	Edward Evans	Labour	Lowestoft	1959
76	Cecil Walker	UUP	Belfast North	2001
75	James Sexton	Labour	St Helens	1931
75	Fenner Brockway	Labour	Eton and Slough	1964
75	Syd Bidwell	Independent Labour	Ealing Southall	1992
75	Richard Taylor	Health Concern	Wyre Forest	2010
75	Marion Fellows	SNP	Motherwell, Wishaw and Carluke	2024
74	Henry Blundell-Hollinshead-Blundell	Conservative	Ince	1906
74	George Edwards	Labour	South Norfolk	1924
74	Enoch Powell	UUP	South Down	1987
74	Peggy Fenner	Conservative	Medway	1997
74	Tom Clarke	Labour	Coatbridge, Chryston and Bellshill	2015
74	Michael Fabricant	Conservative	Lichfield	2024
73	James Fergusson	Conservative	Manchester North East	1906
73	Robert Hobart	Liberal	New Forest	1910 Jan
73	James Hindle Hudson	Labour	Ealing North	1955
72	George Edwards	Labour	South Norfolk	1922
72	Robert Aske	National Liberal	Newcastle upon Tyne East	1945
72	Albert Stubbs	Labour	Cambridgeshire	1950
72	Caroline Ganley	Labour	Battersea South	1951
71	John Cobbold	Conservative	Ipswich	1868
71	Sir Mark MacTaggart-Stewart	Conservative	Kirkcudbrightshire	1906
71	Arthur Strauss	Conservative	Paddington North	1918
71	Sir William Middlebrook	Liberal	Leeds South	1922
71	Sir Davison Dalziel	Conservative	Brixton	1923
71	Ben Tillett	Labour	Salford North	1931
71^{1}	David Hardie	Labour	Glasgow Rutherglen	1931
71	Leo Amery	Conservative	Birmingham Sparkbrook	1945
71	Henry Guest	Conservative	Plymouth Drake	1945
71	Harold Gurden	Conservative	Birmingham Selly Oak	1974 Oct
71	Rhodes Boyson	Conservative	Brent North	1997
71	Gordon Birtwistle	Liberal Democrats	Burnley	2015
71	Giles Watling	Conservative	Clacton	2024
71	Vince Cable	Liberal Democrats	Twickenham	2015
70	Marshall Stevens	Conservative	Eccles	1922
70	Thomas Jewell Bennett	Conservative	Sevenoaks	1923
70	Charles Wilson	Conservative	Leeds Central	1929
70	John Potts	Labour	Barnsley	1931
70	Jonah Walker-Smith	Conservative	Barrow in Furness	1945
70	Dryden Brook	Labour	Halifax	1955
70	Charles William Gibson	Labour	Clapham	1959
70	Sir Samuel Storey	Conservative	Stretford	1966
70	Hugh Jenkins	Labour	Putney	1979
70	Dudley Smith	Conservative	Warwick and Leamington	1997
70	James Hill	Conservative	Southampton Test	1997

^{1}Based on Hardie's earliest estimated birth year of "c. 1860", although some biographers cite a date as late as 27 January 1871, making him only 60 years old at time of that election.

=== Oldest general election victors ===
==== At first election ====
Possibly the oldest known first-time seat winner was Bernard Kelly (born 1808) who was aged 77 when he became the first MP for the new seat of South Donegal in Ireland at the 1885 general election. He died aged reportedly 78 on 1 January 1887. Others:

Age	Candidate	Election
75	Caleb Wright	1885
74^{1}	Sir George Harrison	1885
74	Frank Smith	1929
73	William Beadel	1885
73	Ashton Lister	1918
71	Robert Williams	1807
71	Jim Allister	2024
71	Sir John Elley	1835
70–71^{2}	John Fleming	1818
70	James Caulfeild	1852
70	Frank James	1892
70	Samuel Young	1892
70^{3}	Robert Cameron	1895
70^{4}	George Walker	1945
70^{5}	Piara Khabra	1992
69	William Cobbett	1832
69	Robert Brooks	1859
69	Robert Stickney Blaine	1885
69	Sir Robert Hobart	1906
69	Sir William Peter Griggs	1918
69	Sir George Andreas Berry	1922
69	Alfred Smith	1929
68	Sir William Earle Welby	1802
68	Frank Hornby	1931
68	William Nicol	1859
68	William Raeburn	1918
68	Sir Alfred Waldron Smithers	1918
68	Ethel Bentham	1929
68	Marie Rimmer	2015
68	Mick Whitley	2019
67	George Williams	1832
67	Sir George Berkeley	1852
67	William Henry Sykes	1857
67	William John Lysley	1859
67	Spencer Charrington	1885
67	Henry Howe Bemrose	1895
67	Sir Maurice Dockrell	1918
67	Edwin Perkins	1922
67	Andrew Gilzean	1945
67	Albert Stubbs	1945
67	John McQuade	1979
67	Ernest Roberts	1979
67	Roger Mullin	2015
67	Jo Gideon	2019
67	Susan Murray	2024
66-67	John Forster FitzGerald	1852
66	William Beckett	1841
66	Sir Benjamin Guinness	1865
66	Dadabhai Naoroji	1892
66	William Beale	1906
66	George Henry Faber	1906
66	David Sanders Davies	1918
66	Henry Foreman	1918
66	Marshall Stevens	1918
66	Albert Edward Jacob	1924
66	Sir Frederick Mills	1931
66	William Allan Reid	1931
66	Richard Taylor	2001
66	Gordon Birtwistle	2010
66	Glyn Davies	2010
66	Marion Fellows	2015
66	Rupert Lowe	2024
66	Peter Prinsley	2024
66	Seamus Logan	2024
65	Patricia Ferguson	2024
65	William Moffat	1802
65	James Simmons	1806
65	Peter Rainier	1807
65	Thomas Bernard	1874
65	Hugh Law	1874
65	Alfred Lafone	1886
65	Robert Pearce	1906
65	Alfred Jephcott	1918
65	Alexander Sprot	1918
65	Joseph Leckie	1931
65	Caroline Ganley	1945
65	Mervyn Wheatley	1945
65	George Kerevan	2015
65	Maureen Burke	2024

^{1} Exact birth date not known but Harrison was reportedly this age when he died 5 days after the general election closed and before he took his seat.
^{2} Exact birth date not known but Fleming, who was brought up as an adopted orphan, is usually stated to have been born in 1747.
^{3} Exact birthdate not known but Cameron is normally stated to have been born in 1825 and was reportedly this age at election.
^{4} Exact birthdate not known but Walker is normally stated to have been born in 1874 and was reportedly this age at election.
^{5} Khabra's exact age has been the subject of some disagreement. He claimed a birth year of 1924, which would have made him 67 years old at first election, but his marriage certificate gives a birth year of 1921, and it is this figure which has been used above.

==== At last election ====
- Charles Pelham Villiers, Wolverhampton South, 1895: 93
- Samuel Young, East Cavan, 1910(D): 88
- David Logan, Liverpool Scotland, 1959: 87
- Sir Charles Burrell, New Shoreham, 1859: 85
- Isaac Holden, Keighley, 1892: 85
- Robert Cameron, Houghton-le-Spring, 1910(D): 85
- Dennis Skinner, Bolsover, 2017: 85
- Walter Wilkins, Radnorshire, 1826: 84
- William Hodgson Barrow, South Nottinghamshire, 1868: 84
- Winston Churchill, Woodford, 1959: 84
- Gerald Kaufman, Manchester Gorton, 2015: 84
- William Plumer, Higham Ferrers, 1820: 83
- Christopher Rice Mansel Talbot, Mid Glamorganshire, 1886: 83
- S. O. Davies, Merthyr Tydfil, 1970: 83^{1}
- Piara Khabra, Ealing Southall, 2005: 83
- The Earl of Carhampton, Ludgershall, 1820: 82
- William Ewart Gladstone, Midlothian, 1892: 82
- Paul Flynn, Newport West, 2017: 82
- Sir Thomas Miller, Portsmouth, 1812: 81
- Manny Shinwell, Easington, 1966: 81
- John Rankin, Glasgow Govan, 1970: 81
- David Winnick, Walsall North, 2015: 81
- Whitshed Keene, Montgomery Boroughs, 1812: c.80–81^{2}
- Sir John Aubrey, Horsham, 1820: 80
- William Gore-Langton, Somerset East, 1841: 80
- Lord Palmerston, Tiverton, 1865: 80
- Joseph Warner Henley, Oxfordshire, 1874: 80
- Michael Thomas Bass, Derby, 1880: 80
- James Patrick Mahon, Clare, 1880: 80
- Sir Gilbert Greenall, Warrington, 1886: 80
- John Mowbray, Oxford University, 1895: 80
- John Rankin, Glasgow Govan, 1970: 80
- Edward Heath, Old Bexley and Sidcup, 1997: 80
- Peter Tapsell, Louth and Horncastle, 2010: 80
- Ann Clwyd, Cynon Valley, 2017: 80
- Murdoch Macdonald, Inverness, 1945: 79
- Ian Paisley, Antrim North, 2005: 79
- Geoffrey Robinson, Coventry North-West, 2017: 79
- Bill Cash, Stone, 2019: 79
- Barry Sheerman, Huddersfield, 2019: 79
- John Brocklehurst, 1865: 76
- Margaret Beckett, Derby South, 2019: 76
- Alice Cullen, Glasgow Gorbals, 1966: 75
- Irene Ward, Tynemouth, 1970: 75
- Gwyneth Dunwoody, Crewe and Nantwich, 2005: 74
- Eleanor Rathbone, Combined English Universities, 1945: 73
- Glenda Jackson, Hampstead and Kilburn, 2010: 73
- Angela Watkinson, Hornchurch and Upminster, 2015: 73
- Marie Rimmer, St Helens South and Whiston, 2019: 72
- Louise Ellman, Liverpool Riverside, 2017: 71
- Caroline Ganley, Battersea South, 1950: 70
- Ann Coffey, Stockport, 2017: 70
- Kate Hoey, Vauxhall, 2017: 70

^{1} Davies was suspected of being considerably older than he claimed. There is evidence to suggest he was born in 1879, not 1886; if true, this would indicate he was 90 at his last election.
^{2} Keene's birthdate is given as "c. 1731" in reference works though he was reportedly 90 years old on his death in February 1822. On this the figure is based. Unopposed return, his last contested election was in 1802 when aged 70–71.

Note: All men aged 79 or over since 1945 and over 85 since 1900 are listed, as are all women aged 70 or over.

==== Returning to the house after a gap ====
A contender for the longest gap prior to returning at a general election was possibly Henry Drummond (1786–1860), who returned to the House of Commons in the 1847 general election as member for West Surrey, after a near 35-year absence, though aged only 60. He was previously MP for Plympton Erle from 1810 to 1812.

Others, who returned at older ages than Drummond's:

- Sir Gilbert Greenall was 79 when he returned to the house in 1885, after a 5-year absence, as the member for Warrington, for which he previously sat from 1874 to 1880.
- Robert Carden was 78 when he returned to the house in 1880, after a 21-year absence, as the member for Barnstaple. He had sat for Gloucester from 1857 to 1859.
- Sir Harry Verney was 78 when he returned to the house in 1880, after a 6-year absence, as the member for Buckingham, for which he previously sat from 1857 to 1874.
- Sir John Chetwode was 77 when he returned to the house in 1841, after a 22-year absence, as member for Buckingham. He was previously MP for Newcastle-under-Lyme in 1815–18.
- Sir John Baker was 77 when he returned to the house in 1906, after a 5-year absence, as member for Portsmouth, for which he previously sat in 1892–1900.
- Sir Richard Green-Price was 76 when he returned to the house in 1880, after an 11-year absence, as member for Radnorshire. He had previously sat for Radnor Boroughs 1863–69.
- Sir Mark MacTaggart-Stewart was 75 when he returned to the house in January 1910 after a 4-year absence, as member for Kirkcudbrightshire, for which he previously sat in 1885–1906.
- John Courtenay was 74 when he returned to the house in 1812, after a 5-year absence, as member for Appleby, which he had previously sat for until 1807.
- Thomas Perronet Thompson was 74 when he returned to the house in 1857, after a four-year absence, as member of Bradford, for which he previously sat in 1846–52.
- Alfred Lafone was 74 when he returned to the house in 1895, after a three-year absence, as member for Bermondsey, for which he previously sat in 1886–92.
- John Potts was 74 when he returned to the house in 1935, after a four-year absence. He had sat for Barnsley from 1922 to 1931.
- Vince Cable was 74 when he returned to the house in 2017, after a 2-year absence, as member for Twickenham, for which he previously sat in 1997–2015.
- George Edwards was 73 when he returned to the house in 1923, after a year's absence, as member for South Norfolk, for which he previously sat in 1920–22.
- James Barr was 73 when he returned to the house in 1935 as MP for Coatbridge, after four years' absence. He was previously MP for Motherwell 1924–31.
- William Kirk was 72 or 73 when he returned to the house in 1868, after a 9-year absence, as member for Newry, for which he previously sat in 1852–59.
- Sir Nathaniel Dance-Holland was 72 when he returned to the house in 1807 as MP for East Grinstead, after five months' absence. He was previously MP for Great Bedwyn 1802–06, and East Grinstead before then.
- Sir Davison Dalziel was 72 when he returned to the house in 1924 as MP for Brixton, after nearly a year's absence. He previously sat for the same seat in 1910–23.
- Arthur Shirley Benn was 72 when he returned to the house in 1931 as MP for Sheffield Park, after two years' absence. He previously sat for Plymouth Drake in 1918–29.
- Joseph Alpass was 72 when he returned to the house in 1945 as MP for Thornbury, after 13 years absence. He previously sat for Bristol Central in 1929–31.
- Cahir Healy was 72 when he returned to the house in 1950, after a 15-year voluntary absence, as member for Fermanagh and South Tyrone. He had sat for the predecessor constituency between 1922–24 and 1931–35.
- John Arthur Roebuck was 71 when he returned to the house in 1874, after a 6-year absence, as member for Sheffield, for which he previously sat in 1847–68.
- Mathew Wilson was 71 when he returned to the house in 1874, after a 20-year absence, as member for Northern West Riding of Yorkshire. He had previously sat in two periods for Clitheroe between 1841 and 1853.
- Sir Alexander Sprot was 71 when he returned to the house in 1924 after nearly two years' absence, as member for North Lanarkshire. He had previously sat for East Fife in 1918–22.
- Tommy Lewis was 71 when he returned to the house after a 14-year absence in 1945, as member for Southampton, for which he previously sat between 1929 and 1931.
- William Gore-Langton was 70 when he returned to the house after a five-year absence in 1831, as member for Somerset which he previously represented until 1826.
- Edward Greene was 70 when he returned to the house after seven months' absence in 1886 United Kingdom general election, as member for Stowmarket. He had been MP for Bury St Edmunds until 1885.
- William Joseph Corbet was 70 when he returned to the house after a three-year absence in 1895, as member for East Wicklow, for which he previously sat in 1885–92.
- Charles James Monk was 70 when he returned to the house after nearly 10-year absence in 1895, as member for Gloucester. He previously sat for the borough constituency of that name in two periods between 1859 and 1885.
- Edward Reed was 70 when he returned to the house after a 5-year absence in 1900, as member for Cardiff, for which he previously sat in 1880–95.
- Robert Pearce was 70 when he returned to the house after nearly a year's absence in December 1910, as member for Leek, for which he previously sat between 1906 and January 1910.
- John Ashley Warre was 69 when he returned to the house after a 23-year absence in 1857, as member for Ripon. He previously sat for Hastings in 1831–34.
- Henry Eaton was 69 when he returned to the house after a 5-year absence in 1885, as member for Coventry, for which he previously sat in 1865–80.
- Samuel Storey was 69 when he returned to the house after a 14-year absence in January 1910, as member for Sunderland, for which he previously sat in 1881–95.
- Harry Foster was 69 when he returned to the house after 13 years absence in 1924, as member for Portsmouth Central. He was previously MP for Lowestoft in two periods between 1892 and 1910.
- Alan Clark was 69 when he returned to the house after a 5-year absence in 1997, as member for Kensington and Chelsea. He previously sat for Plymouth Sutton between 1974 and 1992.
- William Mitford was 68 when he returned to the house after a 6-year absence in 1812, as member for New Romney. He previously sat for Bere Alston until 1806.
- John Charles Herries was 68 when he returned to the house after a 6-year absence in 1847, as member for Stamford. He previously sat for Harwich between 1823 and 1841.
- Philip Pleydell-Bouverie was 68 when he returned to the house after a 24-year absence in 1857 as member for Berkshire. He was previously MP for Downton 1831–32.
- George Clive was 68 when he returned to the house after a 5-year absence in 1874, as member for Hereford, for which he previously sat in 1857–68.
- John Hubbard was 68 when he returned to the house after a 5-year absence in 1874, as member for the City of London. He was previously MP for Buckingham in 1859–68.
- J. T. Hibbert was 68 when he returned to the house after a 6-year absence in 1892, as member for Oldham, for which he previously sat in 1877–86.
- George Renwick was 68 when he returned to the house after an 8-year absence in 1918, as member for Newcastle upon Tyne Central. He had previously sat for the undivided Newcastle upon Tyne seat in two periods between 1900 and 1910.
- Sir Alfred Law was 68 when he returned to the house after a 7-year absence in 1929, as member for High Peak. He was previously M.P. for Rochdale in 1918–22.
- Nic Dakin was 68 when he returned to the house after an absence of 4 years, in 2024, as member for Scunthorpe, for which he previously sat in 2010–2019.
- Sir Harry Burrard-Neale was 67 when he returned to the house after an absence of 9 years, in 1832, as member for Lymington, for which he previously sat on several occasions, the last ending in 1823.
- Sir Frederick Smith was 67 when he returned to the house after an absence of 4 years, in 1857, as member for Chatham, for which he previously sat in 1852–53.
- Sir Henry Bulwer was 67 when he returned to the house after a voluntary absence of 21 years, in 1868 as member for Tamworth. He was previously MP for Marylebone in 1835–37.
- Somerville Hastings was 67 when he returned after a 14-year absence in 1945, as member for Barking. He had previously been MP for Reading in 1923–24 and 1929–31.
- Tony Lloyd was 67 when he returned after a 5-year absence in 2017 as member for Rochdale. He had previously sat as MP for Manchester Central in 1997–2012.
- Sir George Philips was 66 when he returned after a two years absence in 1832 as member for South Warwickshire. He was previously MP for Wootton Bassett 1820–30.
- Alfred Billson was 66 when he returned after a 5-year absence in 1906 as member for North West Staffordshire. He had previously sat as MP for Halifax in 1897–1900.
- Sir Thomas Bramsdon was 66 when he returned after a year's absence in 1923, as member for Portsmouth Central, for which he previously sat between 1918 and 1922.
- J.R. Clynes was 66 when he returned after 4 years' absence in 1935, as member for Manchester Platting, for which he previously sat 1906–31
- Arthur Hayday was 66 when he returned after 4 years' absence in 1935, as member for Nottingham West, for which he previously sat in 1918–31.
- Jack Kinley was 66 when he returned after 14 years' absence in 1945, as member for Bootle, for which he previously sat in 1929–31.
- Robert Aglionby Slaney was 65 when he returned after near 5-year's absence in 1857, as member for Shrewsbury, for which he had previously sat in three periods between 1826 and 1852.
- Joseph Arch was 65 when he returned after 6 years absence in 1892 as member for North West Norfolk, for which he previously sat in 1885–86.
- Arthur Hayter was 65 when he returned after 5 years absence in 1900, as member for Walsall, for which he had previously sat in 1893–95.
- John Barker was 65 when he returned after nearly 5 years absence in 1906 as member for Penryn and Falmouth. He was previously MP for Maidstone in 1900–01.
- David Marshall Mason was 65 when he returned after 13 years absence in 1931 as member for Edinburgh East. He was previously MP for Coventry 1910–18.
- Sir Herbert Williams was 65 when he returned after 4 years absence in 1950 for Croydon East. He was previously MP for Croydon South 1932–45.
- David Drew was 65 when he returned after 7 years absence in 2017, as member for Stroud, for which he had previously sat between 1997 and 2010.

=== First women general election victors ===
- Constance Markievicz, Dublin St Patrick's, 1918 – but did not take her seat at Westminster.
- Nancy Astor, Plymouth Sutton,^{y} and Margaret Wintringham, Louth,^{z} 1922 – first to take their seats after a general election.

Notes:

^{y} had entered parliament in by-election 1919 ^{z} had entered parliament in by-election 1921

=== First ethnic minority general election victors ===
- Dadabhai Naoroji, Finsbury Central, 1892
- Mancherjee Bhownagree, Bethnal Green, 1895 and 1900
- Shapurji Saklatvala, Battersea North, 1922 and 1924
- Diane Abbott, first ethnic minority woman to win, Hackney North and Stoke Newington, 1987

=== First general election victors from specific religions ===
When the UK Parliament was established in 1801, non-Anglicans were prevented from taking their seats as MPs under the Test Act 1672. However, Methodists took communion at Anglican churches until 1795, and some continued to do so, and many Presbyterians were prepared to accept Anglican communion, thus ensuring that members of these creeds were represented in the Parliament. Some Unitarians were also elected.

The first Roman Catholic general election victors in the UK Parliament were at the 1830 general election. They included Daniel O'Connell and James Patrick Mahon in Clare.

The first Quaker general election victor was Edward Pease at the 1832 general election.

The first Moravian general election victor was Charles Hindley at the 1835 general election.

Lionel de Rothschild was the first Jewish general election victor at the 1847 general election. He was not permitted to take his seat until the passage of the Jews Relief Act 1858.

The first Catholic Apostolic general election victor was Henry Drummond also at the 1847 election.

The first Baptist general election victor was George Goodman at the 1852 general election.

The first Congregationalist general election victor was Samuel Morley at the 1865 general election.

The first declared atheist to win a general election was Charles Bradlaugh at the 1880 general election. He was not permitted to take his seat in that parliament, but was elected again at the 1885 general election and allowed to take the oath.

Dadabhai Naoroji was the first Parsi general election victor at the 1892 general election.

Piara Khabra became the first Sikh general election victor at the 1992 general election.

Terry Rooney became the first Mormon general election victor at the 1992 general election (previously taking his seat at a by-election in 1990).

The first Muslim general election victor was Mohammed Sarwar at the 1997 general election.

The first Hindu general election victor was Shailesh Vara at the 2005 general election.

The first Buddhist general election victor was Suella Braverman as Suella Fernandes at the 2015 general election.

=== General elections losers awarded seats on disqualification of winner ===
Lord Robert Grosvenor: Fermanagh and South Tyrone, 1955

=== Two or more sitting MPs contest general election ===
It is of course common for former (defeated) MPs to seek re-election, often in their old constituencies, especially if they are marginal or bellwether seats. What is quite unusual is for two MPs both sitting in the same parliament to seek re-election in the same seat. This usually occurs by reason of boundary changes or party splits.

- Italics indicates constituency was newly created at that election
- **Bold** indicates the candidate who won that constituency's seat at that election
- An asterisk marks the MP who was incumbent in that seat, where that seat was not newly created.

Election	Constituency	MP	Party	Notes
2024	Alloa and Grangemouth	Kenny MacAskill	Alba	Both candidates were elected in 2019 for the SNP, but MacAskill defected to Alba. Neither won re-election, with the seat being won by Brian Leishman for Labour.
2024	Alloa and Grangemouth	John Nicolson	SNP	Both candidates were elected in 2019 for the SNP, but MacAskill defected to Alba. Neither won re-election, with the seat being won by Brian Leishman for Labour.
2024	Clwyd East	James Davies	Con	Both candidates were elected as Conservatives, but Roberts was suspended and ran as an independent. Neither won re-election, with the seat being won by Labour.
2024	Clwyd East	Rob Roberts	Ind	Both candidates were elected as Conservatives, but Roberts was suspended and ran as an independent. Neither won re-election, with the seat being won by Labour.
2024	Hitchin	Bim Afolami	Con	Strathern was previously elected in a by-election in Mid Bedfordshire in 2023, whilst Afolami was previously elected in for Hitchin and Harpenden. Both of their former constituencies have components in the new Hitchin seat.
2024	Hitchin	**Alistair Strathern**	Lab	Strathern was previously elected in a by-election in Mid Bedfordshire in 2023, whilst Afolami was previously elected in for Hitchin and Harpenden. Both of their former constituencies have components in the new Hitchin seat.
2024	Honiton and Sidmouth	Simon Jupp	Con	Foord was previously elected in a by-election in Tiverton & Honiton in 2022, whilst Jupp was previously elected for East Devon. Both of their former constituencies have components in the new Honiton & Sidmouth seat.
2024	Honiton and Sidmouth	**Richard Foord**	Lib Dem	Foord was previously elected in a by-election in Tiverton & Honiton in 2022, whilst Jupp was previously elected for East Devon. Both of their former constituencies have components in the new Honiton & Sidmouth seat.
2024	North Shropshire	**Helen Morgan***	Lib Dem	Morgan was previously elected in a by-election in 2021, whilst Baynes was previously elected for Clwyd South, which borders North Shropshire. Baynes' former seat was abolished in boundary changes.
2024	North Shropshire	Simon Baynes	Con	Morgan was previously elected in a by-election in 2021, whilst Baynes was previously elected for Clwyd South, which borders North Shropshire. Baynes' former seat was abolished in boundary changes.
2024	Tamworth	**Sarah Edwards***	Lab	Edwards was previously elected in a by-election in 2023, whilst Hughes was previously elected for Walsall North.
2024	Tamworth	Eddie Hughes	Con	Edwards was previously elected in a by-election in 2023, whilst Hughes was previously elected for Walsall North.
2019	Altrincham and Sale West	**Graham Brady***	Con	Smith was elected in 2017 for Labour, but had defected to the Liberal Democrats.
2019	Altrincham and Sale West	Angela Smith	Lib Dem	Smith was elected in 2017 for Labour, but had defected to the Liberal Democrats.
2019	Wokingham	**John Redwood***	Con	Both candidates were elected in 2017 for the Conservatives, but Lee had since defected to the Liberal Democrats.
2019	Wokingham	Phillip Lee	Lib Dem	Both candidates were elected in 2017 for the Conservatives, but Lee had since defected to the Liberal Democrats.
2019	Finchley and Golders Green	**Mike Freer***	Con	Berger was elected in 2017 for Labour, but had since defected to the Liberal Democrats.
2019	Finchley and Golders Green	Luciana Berger	Lib Dem	Berger was elected in 2017 for Labour, but had since defected to the Liberal Democrats.
2019	Kensington	Emma Dent Coad*	Lab	Gyimah was elected for the Conservatives, but then defected to the Liberal Democrats. Neither incumbent won re-election, with the seat being won by the Conservatives.
2019	Kensington	Sam Gyimah	Lib Dem	Gyimah was elected for the Conservatives, but then defected to the Liberal Democrats. Neither incumbent won re-election, with the seat being won by the Conservatives.
2010	Poplar and Limehouse	**Jim Fitzpatrick**	Lab	Galloway had previously served as MP for the neighbouring Bethnal Green & Bow
2010	Poplar and Limehouse	George Galloway	Respect	Galloway had previously served as MP for the neighbouring Bethnal Green & Bow
2010	Brent Central	Dawn Butler	Lab	Both Butler and Teather's seats were merged into the new Brent Central seat as a result of boundary changes.
2010	Brent Central	**Sarah Teather**	Lib Dem	Both Butler and Teather's seats were merged into the new Brent Central seat as a result of boundary changes.
2005	Dumfries and Galloway	**Russell Brown**	Lab	
2005	Dumfries and Galloway	Peter Duncan	Con	
2005	Bethnal Green and Bow	Oona King*	Lab	Both candidates were elected in 2001 for Labour, but Galloway had since been expelled from the party and founded Respect.
2005	Bethnal Green and Bow	**George Galloway**	Respect	Both candidates were elected in 2001 for Labour, but Galloway had since been expelled from the party and founded Respect.
2001	Brentwood and Ongar	**Eric Pickles***	Con	Bell contested the seat over allegations the Conservative branch was infiltrated by a local church, after unseating Neil Hamilton in 1997 over corruption allegations.
2001	Brentwood and Ongar	Martin Bell	Ind	Bell contested the seat over allegations the Conservative branch was infiltrated by a local church, after unseating Neil Hamilton in 1997 over corruption allegations.
1992	Glasgow Garscadden	**Donald Dewar***	Lab	Both candidates were elected in 1987 for Labour, but Douglas defected to the SNP.
1992	Glasgow Garscadden	Dick Douglas	SNP	Both candidates were elected in 1987 for Labour, but Douglas defected to the SNP.
1987	South Hams	Willie Hamilton	Lab	Hamilton was nominated for South Hams while intending to retire from parliament as the MP for Central Fife.
1987	South Hams	**Anthony Steen***	Con	Hamilton was nominated for South Hams while intending to retire from parliament as the MP for Central Fife.
1983	Meriden	**Iain Mills***	Con	
1983	Meriden	John Sever	Lab	
1983	Islington North	Michael O'Halloran*	Independent Labour	Grant and O'Halloran both defected to the SDP from Labour. Grant was selected as the SDP candidate and O'Halloran ran as Independent Labour. The seat was won by Labour.
1983	Islington North	John Grant	SDP	Grant and O'Halloran both defected to the SDP from Labour. Grant was selected as the SDP candidate and O'Halloran ran as Independent Labour. The seat was won by Labour.
1983	Southwark and Bermondsey	**Simon Hughes**	Lib	
1983	Southwark and Bermondsey	John Tilley	Lab	
1983	Crosby	Shirley Williams*	SDP	
1983	Crosby	**Malcolm Thornton**	Con	
1983	Glasgow Hillhead	**Roy Jenkins***	SDP	
1983	Glasgow Hillhead	Neil Carmichael	Lab	
1974 Feb	Bradford West	John Wilkinson*	Con	
1974 Feb	Bradford West	**Edward Lyons**	Lab	
1974 Feb	Blyth	**Eddie Milne***	Independent Labour	Both candidates were elected in 1970 for Labour, but Milne was deselected and ran as an independent.
1974 Feb	Blyth	Ivor Richard	Lab	Both candidates were elected in 1970 for Labour, but Milne was deselected and ran as an independent.
1974 Feb	Plymouth Devonport	Joan Vickers*	Con	
1974 Feb	Plymouth Devonport	**David Owen**	Lab	
1974 Feb	Brentford and Isleworth	Michael Barnes	Lab	
1974 Feb	Brentford and Isleworth	**Barney Hayhoe**	Con	
1974 Feb	Paddington	**Arthur Latham**	Lab	
1974 Feb	Paddington	Nicholas Scott	Con	
1955	Grantham	**Joseph Godber***	Con	
1955	Grantham	Woodrow Wyatt	Lab	
1955	Reading	**Ian Mikardo**	Lab	
1955	Reading	Frederic Bennett	Con	
1955	Bradford North	**William Taylor***	National Liberal	
1955	Bradford North	Maurice Webb	Lab	
1950	Carmarthen	**Rhys Hopkin Morris***	Lib	
1950	Carmarthen	Lynn Ungoed-Thomas	Lab	
1950	Renfrewshire West	Thomas Scollan*	Lab	
1950	Renfrewshire West	**John Maclay**	National Liberal	
1950	Glasgow Kelvingrove	John Lloyd Williams*	Lab	
1950	Glasgow Kelvingrove	**Walter Elliot**	Unionist	
1950	Newport	**Peter Freeman***	Lab	
1950	Newport	Ivor Thomas	Con	
1950	Sudbury and Woodbridge	**John Hare**	Con	
1950	Sudbury and Woodbridge	Roland Hamilton	Lab	
1950	Stafford and Stone	**Hugh Fraser**	Con	
1950	Stafford and Stone	Stephen Swingler	Lab	
1950	Newark	Sidney Shephard*	Con	
1950	Newark	**George Deer**	Lab	
1950	Carlton	**Kenneth Pickthorn**	Con	
1950	Carlton	Florence Paton	Lab	
1950	Thurrock	Leslie Solley*	Independent Labour	Both candidates were elected in 1945 for Labour, but Solley was suspended from the party and ran for the Labour Independent Group.
1950	Thurrock	**Hugh Delargy**	Lab	Both candidates were elected in 1945 for Labour, but Solley was suspended from the party and ran for the Labour Independent Group.
1950	Walthamstow West	**Clement Attlee**	Lab	Hutchinson was suspended from the party and ran for the Labour Independent Group. Neither MP was the incumbent in this seat.
1950	Walthamstow West	Lester Hutchinson	Independent Labour	Hutchinson was suspended from the party and ran for the Labour Independent Group. Neither MP was the incumbent in this seat.
1950	Walsall	**William Wells***	Lab	
1950	Walsall	John Barlow	National Liberal	
1950	Poole	**Mervyn Wheatley**	Con	
1950	Poole	Evelyn King	Lab	
1950	Middlesbrough East	Alfred Edwards*	Con	Both candidates were elected in 1945 for Labour, but Edwards had since defected to the Conservatives.
1950	Middlesbrough East	**Hilary Marquand**	Lab	Both candidates were elected in 1945 for Labour, but Edwards had since defected to the Conservatives.
1950	Liverpool West Derby	**David Maxwell Fyfe**	Con	
1950	Liverpool West Derby	Bertie Kirby	Lab	
1950	Gateshead East	**Arthur Moody**	Lab	Both candidates were elected in 1945 for Labour, but Zilliacus was suspended from the party (and had also left the Labour Independent Group) and ran as an independent.
1950	Gateshead East	Konni Zilliacus	Ind	Both candidates were elected in 1945 for Labour, but Zilliacus was suspended from the party (and had also left the Labour Independent Group) and ran as an independent.
1950	Exeter	**John Maude***	Con	Horabin was elected in 1945 for the Liberals but had defected to Labour. He moved constituency to avoid campaigning against former colleagues.
1950	Exeter	Thomas Horabin	Lab	Horabin was elected in 1945 for the Liberals but had defected to Labour. He moved constituency to avoid campaigning against former colleagues.
1950	Blackburn West	**Ralph Assheton**	Con	
1950	Blackburn West	John Edwards	Lab	
1950	Stepney	**Walter Edwards**	Lab	
1950	Stepney	Philip Piratin	Communist	
1950	Shoreditch and Finsbury	**Ernest Thurtle**	Lab	Both candidates were elected in 1945 for Labour, but Platts-Mills was suspended from the party and ran for the Labour Independent Group.
1950	Shoreditch and Finsbury	John Platts-Mills	Independent Labour	Both candidates were elected in 1945 for Labour, but Platts-Mills was suspended from the party and ran for the Labour Independent Group.
1945	Lewisham East	Assheton Pownall*	Con	
1945	Lewisham East	**Herbert Morrison**	Lab	
1945	St Marylebone	Alec Cunningham-Reid*	Ind. Conservative	Both candidates were elected in 1935 for the Conservatives, but two competing local Conservative Associations nominated different candidates.
1945	St Marylebone	**Wavell Wakefield**	Con	Both candidates were elected in 1935 for the Conservatives, but two competing local Conservative Associations nominated different candidates.
1945	Putney	**Hugh Linstead***	Con	Acland was elected in 1935 for the Liberals, but had since defected to the Common Wealth Party.
1945	Putney	Richard Acland	Common Wealth	Acland was elected in 1935 for the Liberals, but had since defected to the Common Wealth Party.
1945	Harrow West	**Norman Bower**	Con	
1945	Harrow West	Hugh Lawson	Common Wealth	
1945	Stratford West Ham	Thomas Groves*	Ind	Groves was elected in 1935 for Labour but not reselected and ran as an independent. Neither MP won reelection, with the seat being held for Labour by Henry Nicholls.
1945	Stratford West Ham	Redvers Michael Prior	Con	Groves was elected in 1935 for Labour but not reselected and ran as an independent. Neither MP won reelection, with the seat being held for Labour by Henry Nicholls.
1945	Mossley	Austin Hopkinson*	National	
1945	Mossley	**George Woods**	Lab	

== Frequency and duration records ==
=== Longest period without a general election ===
The longest possible duration of a Parliament is currently five years; prior to the Parliament Act 1911, it was seven years. All period of six years or more between general elections are listed:

9 years, 7 months and 21 days: 1935 – 1945
8 years: December 1910 – 1918
6 years: 1820 – 1826
6 years: 1841 – 1847
6 years: 1859 – 1865
6 years: 1874 – 1880
6 years: 1886 – 1892

=== Shortest period between general elections ===
All periods of less than a year between general elections are listed:

7 months: November 1806 – June 1807
7 months: November/December 1885 – July 1886
7 months and 12 days: February – October 1974
8 months: September 1830 – April/May/June 1831
10 months: December 1923 – October 1924
11 months: January – December 1910

=== Longest continuous governments ===
This details the longest continuous government of each of the parties that have been in power.

Party	Appointed	Removed	Duration
Conservative	4 May 1979	2 May 1997	17 years, 11 months and 28 days
Labour	2 May 1997	11 May 2010	13 years and 9 days
Liberal	5 December 1905	25 May 1915	9 years, 5 months and 20 days
Coalition government^{a}	24 August 1931	26 July 1945	13 years, 11 months and 2 days

^{a} The parties making up the National Government changed throughout this period

=== Election days ===
Currently, all British Parliamentary elections are invariably held on a Thursday. The last general election not held on a Thursday was the 1931 election, which was held on Tuesday 27 October. Prior to this, it was common to hold general elections on any day of the week (other than Sunday), and until the 1918 general election, polling (and the declaration of results) was held over a period of several weeks.

==== Suspended elections ====
On rare occasions, polling in an individual constituency may be suspended, usually as a result of the death of a candidate. The last occasion was at Thirsk and Malton in 2010, where polling was delayed for three weeks owing to the death of the UKIP candidate.

Previous examples occurred at:

- South Staffordshire, 2005
- Barnsley, 1951
- Manchester Moss Side, 1950
- Kingston upon Hull Central, 1945
- Rugby, 1929
- West Derbyshire, 1923
- Kennington, 1918

== Causes of general elections ==
=== Loss of a vote of confidence ===
- 1979
- 1924

=== New Prime Minister seeks a mandate ===
- 2019
- 2017
- 1955
- 1935
- 1931 (MacDonald was the existing PM, but the composition of the government had entirely changed)
- 1923

=== Prime Minister without a working majority seeks to gain one ===
- 2019
- October 1974
- 1966
- 1951

=== Prime Minister's choice of date ===
- 2024
- 2017 (approved by a motion of the House of Commons under the provisions of the Fixed-term Parliaments Act 2011, an act which has since been repealed)
- 2005
- 2001
- 1987
- 1983
- February 1974
- 1970
- 1959
- 1950
- 1929

=== Parliament had run its course ===
- 2015 (in this case this was the duration of the parliament under the, now repealed, Fixed Term Parliament Act 2011)
- 2010
- 1997
- 1992
- 1964

=== Collapse of cooperation within Government ===
- 1922

=== End of World War ===
- 1945
- 1918

== Miscellaneous records ==
=== Incumbents fall directly from first place to fourth place ===
Constituency	Election	Losing party	Gaining party
Ashfield	2024^{1}	Conservative	Reform
Walsall and Bloxwich	2024	Conservative	Labour
Norwich South	2015	Liberal Democrats	Labour
Belfast North	2001^{2}	UUP	DUP
Peckham	1931^{3}	Labour	Conservative

^{1} Sitting Conservative MP defected to Reform UK and won re-election.
^{2} UUP had been unopposed by DUP at previous elections.
^{3} Sitting Labour MP stood instead for the Independent Labour Party and took second place.

=== Incumbents fall directly from first place to third place ===
Constituency	Election	Losing party	Gaining party
Amber Valley	2024	Conservative	Labour
Bangor Aberconwy	2024	Conservative	Labour
Blackpool South	2024	Conservative	Labour
Basildon South and East Thurrock	2024	Conservative	Reform
Bridgend	2024	Conservative	Labour
Caerfyrddin	2024	Conservative	Plaid Cymru
Dover and Deal	2024	Conservative	Labour
Great Grimsby and Cleethorpes	2024	Conservative	Labour
Great Yarmouth	2024	Conservative	Reform
Hazel Grove	2024	Conservative	Liberal Democrats
Hull West and Haltemprice	2024	Conservative	Labour
Leigh and Atherton	2024	Conservative	Labour
Montgomeryshire and Glyndŵr	2024	Conservative	Labour
Newton Aycliffe and Spennymoor	2024	Conservative	Labour
Spen Valley	2024	Conservative	Labour
Stoke-on-Trent Central	2024	Conservative	Labour
Telford	2024	Conservative	Labour
Thurrock	2024	Conservative	Labour
Wakefield and Rothwell	2024	Conservative	Labour
Whitehaven and Workington	2024	Conservative	Labour
Ashfield	2019	Labour	Conservative
Clacton	2017	UKIP	Conservative
Southport	2017	Liberal Democrats	Conservative
Bristol West	2015	Liberal Democrats	Labour
Brent Central	2015	Liberal Democrats	Labour
Berwickshire, Roxburgh and Selkirk	2015	Liberal Democrats	SNP
Dumfries and Galloway	2015	Labour	SNP
Aberdeenshire West and Kincardine	2015	Liberal Democrats	SNP
Bristol North West	2010	Labour	Conservative
Colne Valley	2010	Labour	Conservative
Watford	2010	Labour	Conservative
Belfast South	2005	UUP	SDLP
Conwy	1997	Conservative	Labour
Aberdeen South	1997	Conservative	Labour
Inverness East, Nairn and Lochaber	1997	Liberal Democrats	Labour
Stockton South	1983^{1}	Labour	SDP
Plymouth Devonport	1983^{1}	Labour	SDP
Caithness and Sutherland	1983^{1}	Labour	SDP
Erith and Crayford	1983^{1}	Labour	Conservative
Renfrew West and Inverclyde	1983^{1}	Labour	Conservative
Southampton Itchen	1983^{1}	Labour	Conservative
Clwyd South West	1983^{1}	Labour	Conservative
West Hertfordshire	1983	Labour	Conservative
Stevenage	1983	Labour	Conservative
East Dunbartonshire	1979	SNP	Labour
North Down	1979^{2}	UUP	Ind. Unionist
Mid Ulster	1974 Feb	Unity	Vanguard
Bolton West	1964	Liberal	Labour
Glasgow Bridgeton	1950^{3}	Ind. Labour Party	Labour
Rugby	1950	Independent	Labour
Hammersmith North	1950	Independent Labour	Labour
Grantham	1950	Independent	Conservative
Cheltenham	1950	Independent	Conservative
Stepney	1950	Communist	Labour
West Fife	1950	Communist	Labour
Caithness and Sutherland	1945	Liberal	Unionist

^{1} The sitting Labour MP had defected to the SDP in 1981.
^{2} The sitting Ulster Unionist Party MP had defected to sit as an Independent Unionist.
^{3} The sitting Independent Labour Party MP had defected to Labour.

=== Outgoing Government gains seats ===
When there is a decisive change in electoral sentiment, a tiny number of seats will not only buck the trend by not moving as expected, but may actually move in the opposite direction. Only elections that saw a change of government are listed, since it is fairly common for a few seats to move in divergent directions when an incumbent government is re-elected; 2005 was an exception to this case, when the Labour party scored no gains.

Italics indicates seat was regained after having been lost in a previous by-election

Constituency	Election	Gaining Party	Losing Party
Leicester East	2024	Conservative	Labour
Bethnal Green and Bow	2010	Labour	Respect
Blaenau Gwent	2010	Labour	Independent
Chesterfield	2010	Labour	Liberal Democrats
Dunfermline and West Fife	2010	Labour	Liberal Democrats
Glasgow East	2010	Labour	SNP
Christchurch	1997	Conservative	Liberal Democrats
Glasgow Cathcart	1979	Labour	Conservative
Clackmannan and East Stirlingshire	1979	Labour	SNP
East Dunbartonshire	1979	Labour	SNP
Carmarthen	1979	Labour	Plaid Cymru
Ashfield	1979	Labour	Conservative
Birmingham Stechford	1979	Labour	Conservative
Walsall North	1979	Labour	Conservative
Workington	1979	Labour	Conservative
Berwick and East Lothian	1974 Feb	Conservative	Labour
East Dunbartonshire	1974 Feb	Conservative	Labour
Upminster	1974 Feb	Conservative	Labour
Ipswich	1974 Feb	Conservative	Labour
North West Norfolk	1974 Feb	Conservative	Labour
Ripon	1974 Feb	Conservative	Liberal
Sutton and Cheam	1974 Feb	Conservative	Liberal
Bromsgrove and Redditch	1974 Feb	Conservative	Labour
Colne Valley	1970	Labour	Liberal
Birmingham Ladywood	1970	Labour	Liberal
Swindon	1970	Labour	Conservative
Oldham West	1970	Labour	Conservative
Dudley	1970	Labour	Conservative
Acton	1970	Labour	Conservative
Walthamstow West	1970	Labour	Conservative
Glasgow Pollok	1970	Labour	Conservative
Hamilton	1970	Labour	SNP
Carmarthen	1970	Labour	Plaid Cymru
Birmingham Perry Barr	1964	Conservative	Labour
Eton and Slough	1964	Conservative	Labour
Smethwick	1964	Conservative	Labour
South West Norfolk	1964	Conservative	Labour
South Dorset	1964	Conservative	Labour
Anglesey	1951	Labour	Liberal
Merioneth	1951	Labour	Liberal
Caithness and Sutherland	1945	Conservative	Liberal
Berwick upon Tweed	1945	Conservative	Liberal
Caernarvon	1945	Conservative	Liberal
Isle of Ely	1945	Conservative	Liberal
Barnstaple	1945	Conservative	Liberal
Wallasey	1945	Conservative	Independent
Skipton	1945	Conservative	Common Wealth
Birmingham King's Norton	1929	Conservative	Labour
Midlothian and Peebles Northern	1929	Conservative	Labour
Lancaster	1929	Conservative	Liberal

=== Incoming Government loses seats ===
Notes: In 2010 the Conservatives entered government as the largest party in a coalition and in 2015 they went from being part of a coalition to being a majority government in their own right.
In 2017 the Conservatives entered government without an overall majority and in 2019 they went from having a minority government to being a majority government in their own right.

In 2010 the Liberal Democrats entered government as a junior partner in a coalition.

Italics indicates seat was previously lost at a by-election and not regained by the incoming government at a general election

Constituency	Election	Losing Party	Gaining Party
Birmingham Perry Barr	2024	Labour	Independent
Blackburn	2024	Labour	Independent
Bristol Central	2024	Labour	Green
Dewsbury and Batley	2024	Labour	Independent
Islington North	2024	Labour	Independent
Leicester East	2024	Labour	Conservative
Leicester South	2024	Labour	Independent
Enfield North	2015	Conservative	Labour
Ealing Central and Acton	2015	Conservative	Labour
Lancaster and Fleetwood	2015	Conservative	Labour
Dewsbury	2015	Conservative	Labour
Wolverhampton South West	2015	Conservative	Labour
Brentford and Isleworth	2015	Conservative	Labour
City of Chester	2015	Conservative	Labour
Wirral West	2015	Conservative	Labour
Eastbourne	2010	Conservative	Liberal Democrats
Wells	2010	Conservative	Liberal Democrats
Solihull	2010	Conservative	Liberal Democrats
Dunfermline and West Fife	2010	Liberal Democrats	Labour
Chesterfield	2010	Liberal Democrats	Labour
Camborne and Redruth	2010	Liberal Democrats	Conservative
Cornwall South East	2010	Liberal Democrats	Conservative
Harrogate and Knaresborough	2010	Liberal Democrats	Conservative
Hereford and South Herefordshire	2010	Liberal Democrats	Conservative
Montgomeryshire	2010	Liberal Democrats	Conservative
Newton Abbot	2010	Liberal Democrats	Conservative
Oxford West and Abingdon	2010	Liberal Democrats	Conservative
Richmond Park	2010	Liberal Democrats	Conservative
Romsey and Southampton North	2010	Liberal Democrats	Conservative
Truro and Falmouth	2010	Liberal Democrats	Conservative
Winchester	2010	Liberal Democrats	Conservative
Glasgow Cathcart	1979	Conservative	Labour
Berwick and East Lothian	1974 Feb	Labour	Conservative
East Dunbartonshire	1974 Feb	Labour	Conservative
Clackmannan and East Stirlingshire	1974 Feb	Labour	SNP
Dundee East	1974 Feb	Labour	SNP
Blyth	1974 Feb	Labour	Independent Labour
Lincoln	1974 Feb	Labour	Democratic Labour
Cardigan	1974 Feb	Labour	Liberal
Colne Valley	1974 Feb	Labour	Liberal
Rochdale	1974 Feb	Labour	Liberal
North Antrim	1970	UUP	DUP
Fermanagh and South Tyrone	1970	UUP	Unity
Mid Ulster	1970	UUP	Unity
Birmingham Perry Barr	1964	Labour	Conservative
Eton and Slough	1964	Labour	Conservative
Smethwick	1964	Labour	Conservative
South West Norfolk	1964	Labour	Conservative
Belfast West	1951	UUP	Irish Labour
Carmarthen	1945	Labour	Liberal
Mile End	1945	Labour	Communist
Birmingham King's Norton	1929	Labour	Conservative
Bethnal Green North East	1929	Labour	Liberal
Newcastle East	1929	Labour	Liberal
Motherwell	1924	Conservative	Labour
Barrow-in-Furness	1924	Conservative	Labour
Lincoln	1924	Conservative	Labour
Liverpool West Toxteth	1924	Conservative	Labour
Birmingham King's Norton	1924	Conservative	Labour
Bilston	1924	Conservative	Labour
Peckham	1924	Conservative	Labour
London University	1924	Conservative	Independent
Ayr Burghs	1906	Liberal	Conservative
Barkston Ash	1906	Liberal	Conservative
Govan	1906	Liberal	Conservative
Hastings	1906	Liberal	Conservative
Maidstone	1906	Liberal	Conservative
Oswestry	1906	Liberal	Conservative
Rye	1906	Liberal	Conservative
St Albans	1906	Liberal	Conservative
St Andrews Burgh	1906	Liberal	Conservative
Whitby	1906	Liberal	Conservative
North Lonsdale	1906	Liberal	Liberal Unionist

=== Seats gained from fourth place^{*} ===
- Ashfield, 2024 gained by Reform UK (formerly the Brexit Party in 2019) from the Conservatives.
- North Herefordshire, 2024 gained by the Greens from the Conservatives.
- Argyll and Bute, 2015 gained by SNP from the Liberal Democrats
- Edinburgh West, 2015 gained by SNP from the Liberal Democrats
- Inverness East, Nairn and Lochaber, 1997 gained by Labour from the Liberal Democrats
- Ceredigion and Pembroke North, 1992 gained by Plaid Cymru from the Liberals

=== Seats gained from third place^{*} ===
- Alloa and Grangemouth, 2024 gained by Labour from the SNP
- Ayr, Carrick and Cumnock, 2024 gained by Labour from the SNP
- Ayrshire Central, 2024 gained by Labour from the SNP
- Ayrshire North and Arran, 2024 gained by Labour from the SNP
- Bathgate and Linlithgow, 2024 gained by Labour from the SNP
- Edinburgh South West, 2024 gained by Labour from the SNP
- Falkirk, 2024 gained by Labour from the SNP
- Kilmarnock and Loudoun, 2024 gained by Labour from the SNP
- Renfrewshire East, 2024 gained by Labour from the SNP
- Stirling and Strathallan, 2024 gained by Labour from the SNP
- Inverness, Skye and West Ross-shire, 2024 gained by the Liberal Democrats from the SNP
- Waveney Valley, 2024 gained by the Greens from the Conservatives
- Ynys Môn, 2024 gained by Plaid Cymru from the Conservatives
- North Down, 2019 gained by Alliance from an independent
- Aberdeen South, 2017 gained by the Conservatives from the SNP
- Ayr, Carrick and Cumnock, 2017 gained by the Conservatives from the SNP
- East Renfrewshire, 2017 gained by the Conservatives from the SNP
- Gordon, 2017 gained by the Conservatives from the SNP
- Ochil and South Perthshire, 2017 gained by the Conservatives from the SNP
- Portsmouth South, 2017 gained by Labour from the Conservatives
- Stirling, 2017 gained by the Conservatives from the SNP
- Cambridge, 2015 gained by Labour from the Liberal Democrats
- Belfast East, 2010 gained by Alliance from the DUP
- Brighton Pavilion, 2010 gained by the Greens from Labour
- Watford, 2010 gained by the Conservatives from Labour
- Camborne and Redruth, 2010 gained by the Conservatives from the Liberal Democrats
- Falmouth and Camborne, 2005 gained by the Liberal Democrats from Labour
- Leeds North West, 2005 gained by the Liberal Democrats from Labour
- Lagan Valley, 2005 gained by the DUP from the UUP^{1}
- West Tyrone, 2001 gained by Sinn Féin from the UUP
- Sittingbourne and Sheppey, 1997 gained by Labour from the Conservatives
- Shrewsbury and Atcham, 1997 gained by Labour from the Conservatives
- St. Albans, 1997 gained by Labour from the Conservatives
- Oldham East and Saddleworth, 1997 gained by Labour from the Conservatives^{2}
- Leeds North West, 1997 gained by Labour from the Conservatives
- Hastings and Rye, 1997 gained by Labour from the Conservatives
- Falmouth and Camborne, 1997 gained by Labour from the Conservatives
- Conwy, 1997 gained by Labour from the Conservatives
- Bristol West, 1997 gained by Labour from the Conservatives
- Aberdeen South, 1997 gained by Labour from the Conservatives
- Mid Ulster, 1997 gained by Sinn Féin from the DUP
- Cambridge, 1992 gained by Labour from the Conservatives
- Plymouth Devonport, 1992 gained by Labour from the SDP
- Clwyd South West, 1987 gained by Labour from the Conservatives
- Edinburgh South, 1987 gained by Labour from the Conservatives
- Strathkelvin and Bearsden, 1987 gained by Labour from the Conservatives
- Renfrew West and Inverclyde, 1987 gained by Labour from the Conservatives
- Colne Valley, 1983 gained by the Liberals from Labour
- Leeds West, 1983 gained by the Liberals from Labour
- Southwark and Bermondsey, 1983 gained by the Liberals from Labour^{3}
- Liverpool Mossley Hill, 1983 gained by the Liberals from the Conservatives
- Ross, Cromarty and Skye, 1983 gained by the SDP from the Conservatives^{4}
- East Dunbartonshire, 1979 gained by Labour from the SNP
- Lincoln, 1979 gained by the Conservatives from Labour
- East Dunbartonshire, October 1974 gained by the SNP from the Conservatives
- Clackmannan and East Stirlingshire, February 1974 gained by the SNP from Labour
- Isle of Wight, February 1974 gained by the Liberals from the Conservatives
- Ross and Cromarty, 1970 gained by the Conservatives from the Liberals
- Ross and Cromarty, 1964 gained by the Liberals from the National Liberals

Notes:
^{*} only includes examples of genuine three-or-more party competition; does not include seats gained as a result of pacts
^{1} sitting member had defected from UUP to DUP
^{2} Liberal Democrats had won a by-election in predecessor constituency in which Labour finished second
^{3} by-election gain confirmed at general election.
^{4} SDP candidate ran for the Alliance in seat with strong Liberal tradition.

=== General election victors had not contested previous election ===
It is unusual for a party that had not contested the seat at the previous election to win it. Since the major mainland parties now routinely contest all seats, except the Speaker's, such rare victories tend to come from independents or splinter-parties.

- Basildon South and East Thurrock, 2024: Reform UK, James McMurdock
- Boston and Skegness, 2024: Reform UK Richard Tice^{1}
- Clacton, 2024: Reform UK Nigel Farage
- North Antrim, 2024: TUV Jim Allister
- Clacton, 2015^{4}: UK Independence Party, Douglas Carswell
- Fermanagh and South Tyrone, 2015: Ulster Unionist Tom Elliott
- Bethnal Green and Bow, 2005: Respect, George Galloway
- Blaenau Gwent, 2005: Independent Peter Law
- Wyre Forest, 2001: IKHH, Richard Taylor
- North Down, 1997^{4}: UKUP, Robert McCartney
- Tatton, 1997: Independent Martin Bell
- Belfast West, 1983: Sinn Féin, Gerry Adams
- Caithness and Sutherland, 1983: SDP, Robert Maclennan
- Mid Ulster, 1983: Democratic Unionist, William McCrea
- Belfast East, 1979: Democratic Unionist, Peter Robinson
- Belfast South, 1979^{2}: Ulster Unionist, Robert Bradford
- Mid Ulster, 1979^{3}: United Ulster Unionist, John Dunlop
- Belfast East, February 1974: Vanguard, William Craig
- Belfast South, February 1974: Vanguard, Robert Bradford
- Belfast West, February 1974^{6}: SDLP, Gerry Fitt
- Lincoln, February 1974^{4}: Democratic Labour, Dick Taverne
- Mid Ulster, February 1974: Vanguard, John Dunlop
- North Antrim, February 1974^{5}: DUP, Ian Paisley
- Mid Ulster, 1970: Unity, Bernadette Devlin
- North Antrim, 1970: PUP, Ian Paisley
- Western Isles, 1970: SNP, Donald Stewart
- Caithness and Sutherland, 1964: Liberal, George Mackie

Notes:

- ^{1} Richard Tice contested Hartlepool in 2019.
- ^{2} Vanguard broke up in the late 1970s; the sitting MP joined the Ulster Unionists.
- ^{3} Vanguard broke up in the late 1970s; the sitting MP joined the United Ulster Unionists.
- ^{4} By-election gain confirmed at the general election.
- ^{5} The Protestant Unionist Party merged into the Democratic Unionist Party in 1970.
- ^{6} Sitting MP Gerry Fitt had left the Republican Labour Party for the SDLP in 1970; by 1974 Republican Labour had disintegrated.

=== Incumbent party did not contest ===
The rare occasions where the party which won the previous election did not contest the seat. Independent candidates are not included, nor Speakers of the House of Commons. Cases where candidates were suspended from their parties after nominations closed (meaning they still appeared on the ballot under the name of their former party) are also not counted. Also excluded are occasions where the party had merged into an organisation which did contest the election, such as when the Social Democratic Party and Liberal Party formed the Liberal Democrats, or the Vanguard Unionist Progressive Party merged into the Ulster Unionist Party.

Election	Constituency	Incumbent party	Notes
1997	North Down	UPUP	Sole UPUP MP had died and party had subsequently collapsed. The UK Unionist Party had won the 1995 by-election, meaning the UPUP were no longer incumbents in 1997.
1983	Mid Ulster	UUUP	UUUP had dissolved and former MP stood down.
1974 February	Belfast West	Republican Labour	MP had defected to the Social Democratic and Labour Party and RLP had dissolved.
1959	Caithness and Sutherland	Unionist	Stood aside for Independent Unionist David Robertson.
1955	Fermanagh and Tyrone	Nationalist	Stood aside for Sinn Féin candidate.
1950	Chelmsford	Common Wealth	MP had defected to Labour and party decided not to contest any further elections.
1950	Glasgow Camlachie	Ind. Labour Party	MP had defected to Labour, then the ILP had performed badly in the 1948 by-election.

=== Major party did not run ===
Not including instances where major parties did not run in seats contested by the Speaker.

==== Conservative ====
- Rotherham, 2024
- Greenock, 1970
- Huddersfield West, 1959
- Pembrokeshire, 1955
- Carmarthen, 1955
- Huddersfield West, 1955
- Carmarthen, 1951
- Colne Valley, 1951
- Huddersfield West, 1951
- Carmarthen, 1950
- Huddersfield West, 1950

==== Labour ====
- Tatton, 1997
- Chelmsford, 1945
- Woodford, 1945

==== Liberal Democrats ====
- Manchester Rusholme, 2024
- Arfon, 2019^{2P}
- Beaconsfield, 2019^{2I}
- Brighton Pavilion, 2019^{2G}
- Bristol West, 2019^{2G}
- Broxtowe, 2019^{2I}
- Bury St Edmunds, 2019^{2G}
- Caerphilly, 2019^{2P}
- Cannock Chase, 2019^{2G}
- Carmarthen East and Dinefwr, 2019^{2P}
- Dulwich and West Norwood, 2019^{2G}
- Dwyfor Meirionnydd, 2019^{2P}
- Exeter, 2019^{2G}
- Forest of Dean, 2019^{2G}
- Isle of Wight, 2019^{2G}
- Llanelli, 2019^{2P}
- Luton South, 2019^{2I}
- Pontypridd, 2019^{2P}
- Stroud, 2019^{2G}
- Vale of Glamorgan, 2019^{2G}
- Ynys Môn, 2019^{2P}
- Brighton Pavilion, 2017
- Skipton and Ripon, 2017
- Wyre Forest, 2005
- Wyre Forest, 2001
- Tatton, 1997

==== Liberal Party (pre-Liberal Democrats) ====
- Birmingham Handsworth, 1979
- Dudley West, 1979
- Ormskirk, 1979
- Salford East, 1979
- Woodford, 1945

^{2}: As part of the Unite to Remain pact, the Liberal Democrats stood aside in favour of Green (2G), Plaid Cymru (2P) and independent (2I) candidates in some seats.

=== Victories by minor parties ===
Victories by independent and minor party candidates since 1945, not including the Scottish National Party, Plaid Cymru or Northern Ireland parties. For a complete list, see the list of UK minor party and independent MPs elected.

Election	Member	Party	Constituency
2024	Siân Berry	Green	Brighton Pavilion
2024	Ellie Chowns	Green	North Herefordshire
2024	Carla Denyer	Green	Bristol Central
2024	Adrian Ramsay	Green	Waveney Valley
2024	Lee Anderson	Reform UK^{C}	Ashfield
2024	Nigel Farage	Reform UK	Clacton
2024	Rupert Lowe	Reform UK	Great Yarmouth
2024	James McMurdock	Reform UK	Basildon South and East Thurrock
2024	Richard Tice	Reform UK	Boston and Skegness
2024	Shockat Adam	Independent	Leicester South
2024	Jeremy Corbyn	Independent^{L}	Islington North
2024	Adnan Hussain	Independent	Blackburn
2024	Ayoub Khan	Independent	Birmingham Perry Barr
2024	Iqbal Mohamed	Independent	Dewsbury and Batley
2019	Caroline Lucas	Green	Brighton Pavilion
2017	Caroline Lucas	Green	Brighton Pavilion
2015	Caroline Lucas	Green	Brighton Pavilion
2015	Douglas Carswell	UKIP^{C}	Clacton
2010	Caroline Lucas	Green	Brighton Pavilion
2005	Richard Taylor	Kidderminister Health Concern	Wyre Forest
2005	George Galloway	Respect Party^{L}	Bethnal Green and Bow
2005	Peter Law	Independent^{L}	Blaenau Gwent
2001	Richard Taylor	Kidderminister Health Concern	Wyre Forest
1997	Martin Bell	Independent	Tatton
1974 Feb	Dick Taverne	Democratic Labour^{L}	Lincoln
1974 Feb	Eddie Milne	Independent Labour^{L}	Blyth
1970	S. O. Davies	Independent Labour^{L}	Merthyr Tydfil
1959	David Robertson	Independent Conservative^{C}	Caithness and Sutherland
1950	John MacLeod	Independent Liberal and Conservative	Ross and Cromarty
1945	John MacLeod	Independent Liberal	Ross and Cromarty
1945	Ernest Millington	Common Wealth Party	Chelmsford
1945	Willie Gallacher	Communist	West Fife
1945	Phil Piratin	Communist	Mile End

- ^{C}: Formerly elected for Conservatives or an affiliated party.
- ^{L}: Formerly elected for Labour or an affiliated party.

=== Independent candidates winning 10% or more ===
Independent candidates who did not win, but took 10% or more of the vote in their constituency

Constituency	Election	Candidate	Votes	Percentage	Position	Notes
Batley and Spen	2019	Paul Halloran	6,432	12.2	3	
Beaconsfield	2019	Dominic Grieve	16,765	29.0	2	Previously represented the seat for the Conservatives
Bethnal Green and Stepney	2024	Ajmal Masroor	14,207	30.5	2	
Birkenhead	2019	Frank Field	7,285	17.2	2	Previously represented the seat for Labour
Birmingham Hall Green and Moseley	2024	Shakeel Afsar	7,142	17.2	2	
Birmingham Hall Green and Moseley	2024	Mohammad Hafeez	6,159	14.8	3	
Birmingham Ladywood	2024	Akhmed Yakoob	12,137	33.2	2	Endorsed by the Workers Party of Britain
Bradford South	2024	Rehiana Ali	3,345	10.1	5	
Bradford West	2017	Salma Yaqoob	6,345	13.9	3	
Bradford West	2024	Muhammed Islam	11,017	29.7	2	
Buckingham	2017	Scott Raven	5,638	10.7	3	Standing against the Speaker of the House of Commons, John Bercow
Chingford and Woodford Green	2024	Faiza Shaheen	12,445	25.7	3	Candidate for Labour in 2019 and was selected in 2022 to stand but was deselected after the election was announced.
Chorley	2019	Mark Brexit-Smith	9,439	23.7	2	Standing against the Speaker of the House of Commons, Lindsay Hoyle. Selected as a Brexit Party candidate, ran as an independent after the party withdrew
Ealing Southall	2001	Avtar Lit	5,764	12.3	3	
East Devon	2015	Claire Wright	13,140	24.0	2	
East Devon	2017	Claire Wright	21,270	35.2	2	
East Devon	2019	Claire Wright	25,869	40.4	2	
East Ham	2024	Tahir Mirza	6,707	17.7	2	
Fermanagh and South Tyrone	2001	Jim Dixon	6,843	13.2	4	
Fermanagh and South Tyrone	2010	Rodney Connor	21,300	41.5	2	Supported by the DUP and UUP
Fylde	2015	Mike Hill	5,166	11.9	4	
Hereford and South Herefordshire	2017	Jim Kenyon	5,560	11.0	3	
Heywood and Middleton North	2024	Chris Furlong	4,349	11.7	4	Endorsed by the Green Party of England and Wales
Holborn and St Pancras	2024	Andrew Feinstein	7,312	18.9	2	
Ilford North	2024	Leanne Mohamad	15,119	32.2	2	
Leicester East	2024	Claudia Webbe	5,532	11.8	4	Previously represented the seat for Labour. Endorsed by the Workers Party.
Middlesbrough	2019	Antony High	4,548	14.2	3	
Nelson and Colne	1966	Patrick Downey	5,117	13.7	3	The candidate was the uncle of Lesley Anne Downey, a victim in the Moors murders case, who stood against Labour candidate and opponent to capital punishment, Sydney Silverman on a pro-hanging platform.
Preston	2024	Michael Lavalette	8,715	21.8	2	
Sedgefield	2005	Reg Keys	4,252	10.3	4	Standing against the-Prime Minister Tony Blair
South Holland and the Deepings	2024	Mark Le Sage	5,031	10.9	4	
South West Hertfordshire	2019	David Gauke	15,919	26.0	2	Previously represented the seat for the Conservatives
South West Norfolk	2024	James Bagge	6,282	14.2	4	
West Bromwich West	1997	Richard Silvester	8,546	23.3	2	Standing against the Speaker of the House of Commons, Betty Boothroyd
West Tyrone	2005	Kieran Deeny	11,905	27.4	2	

=== Minor parties' other strong performance ===
Minor parties without representation in Parliament which won 10% or more of the votes cast:

Party	Constituency	Election	Candidate	Votes	Percentage	Position	Notes
Alliance	Belfast East	1983	Oliver Napier	9,373	24.1	3	
Alliance	Belfast East	1987	John Alderdice	10,574	32.1	2	
Alliance	Belfast East	1992	John Alderdice	10,650	29.8	2	
Alliance	Belfast East	1997	Jim Hendron	9,288	23.8	3	
Alliance	Belfast East	2001	David Alderdice	5,832	15.8	3	
Alliance	Belfast East	2005	Naomi Long	15,443	36.0	2	The highest vote share ever achieved by a party with no MPs.
Alliance	Belfast East	2017	Naomi Long	3,746	12.2	3	
Alliance	Belfast South	1983	David Cook	8,945	23.9	2	
Alliance	Belfast South	1987	David Cook	6,963	21.3	2	
Alliance	Belfast South	1992	John Montgomery	5,054	15.0	3	
Alliance	Belfast South	1997	Steve McBride	5,112	12.9	4	
Alliance	Belfast South	2017	Paula Bradshaw	7,946	18.2	3	
Alliance	East Antrim	1983	Seán Neeson	7,620	20.0	3	
Alliance	East Antrim	1987	Seán Neeson	8,582	25.6	2	
Alliance	East Antrim	1992	Seán Neeson	9,132	23.3	3	
Alliance	East Antrim	1997	Seán Neeson	6,929	20.2	2	
Alliance	East Antrim	2001	John Matthews	4,483	12.5	3	
Alliance	East Antrim	2005	Seán Neeson	4,869	15.3	3	
Alliance	East Antrim	2017	Stewart Dickson	5,950	15.6	2	
Alliance	Lagan Valley	1983	Seamus Close	4,593	11.3	3	
Alliance	Lagan Valley	1987	Seamus Close	5,728	13.8	2	
Alliance	Lagan Valley	1992	Seamus Close	6,207	12.7	2	
Alliance	Lagan Valley	1997	Seamus Close	7,635	17.2	2	
Alliance	Lagan Valley	2001	Seamus Close	7,624	16.6	2	
Alliance	Lagan Valley	2005	Seamus Close	4,316	10.1	3	
Alliance	Lagan Valley	2017	Aaron McIntyre	4,996	11.1	3	
Alliance	North Antrim	1987	Gareth Williams	5,140	12.4	3	
Alliance	North Down	1983	John Cushnahan	9,015	22.1	2	
Alliance	North Down	1987	John Cushnahan	7,932	19.4	3	
Alliance	North Down	1992	Addie Morrow	6,611	14.7	3	
Alliance	North Down	1997	Oliver Napier	7,554	20.7	3	
Alliance	South Antrim	1983	Gordon Mawhinney	4,612	11.9	3	
Alliance	South Antrim	1987	Gordon Mawhinney	5,808	16.0	2	
Alliance	South Antrim	1992	John Blair	5,244	12.4	3	
Alliance	South Antrim	1997	David Ford	4,668	11.6	3	
Alliance	Strangford	1983	Addie Morrow	6,171	15.8	3	
Alliance	Strangford	1987	Addie Morrow	7,553	20.3	2	
Alliance	Strangford	1992	Kieran McCarthy	7,585	16.9	3	
Alliance	Strangford	1997	Kieran McCarthy	5,467	13.1	3	
Alliance	Strangford	2017	Kellie Armstrong	5,693	14.7	2	
Ashfield Ind.	Ashfield	2019	Jason Zadrozny	13,498	27.6	2	
Ashfield Ind.	Ashfield	2024	Jason Zadrozny	6,276	15.7	3	
Brexit Party	Barnsley Central	2019	Victoria Felton	11,233	30.4	2	
Brexit Party	Barnsley East	2019	Jim Ferguson	11,112	29.2	2	
Brexit Party	Bassetlaw	2019	Debbie Soloman	5,366	10.6	3	
Brexit Party	Blaenau Gwent	2019	Richard Taylor	6,215	20.6	2	
Brexit Party	Blaydon	2019	Michael Robinson	5,833	12.8	3	
Brexit Party	Caerphilly	2019	Nathan Gill	4,490	11.2	4	
Brexit Party	Chesterfield	2019	John Scotting	4,771	10.6	3	
Brexit Party	Cynon Valley	2019	Rebecca Rees-Evans	3,045	10.1	3	
Brexit Party	Doncaster Central	2019	Surjit Duhre	6,842	16.5	3	
Brexit Party	Doncaster North	2019	Andy Stewart	8,294	20.4	3	
Brexit Party	North Durham	2019	Peter Telford	4,693	11.1	3	
Brexit Party	Don Valley	2019	Paul Whitehurst	6,247	13.7	3	
Brexit Party	Easington	2019	Julie Maughan	6,744	19.5	3	
Brexit Party	Hartlepool	2019	Richard Tice	10,603	25.8	3	
Brexit Party	Hemsworth	2019	Waj Ali	5,930	13.5	3	
Brexit Party	Houghton and Sunderland South	2019	Kevin Yuill	6,165	15.5	3	
Brexit Party	Kingston upon Hull East	2019	Marten Hall	5,764	17.8	3	
Brexit Party	Kingston upon Hull North	2019	Derek Abram	4,771	13.9	3	
Brexit Party	Kingston upon Hull West and Hessle	2019	Michelle Dewberry	5,638	18.0	3	
Brexit Party	Islwyn	2019	James Wells	4,834	14.1	3	
Brexit Party	Jarrow	2019	Richard Leslie Monaghan	4,172	10.0	3	
Brexit Party	Makerfield	2019	Ross Wright	5,817	13.1	3	
Brexit Party	Merthyr Tydfil and Rhymney	2019	David Jones	3,604	11.2	3	
Brexit Party	North Durham	2019	Peter Telford	4,693	11.1	3	
Brexit Party	North Tyneside	2019	Andrew Husband	5,254	10.4	3	
Brexit Party	Normanton, Pontefract and Castleford	2019	Deneice Florence-Jukes	8,032	16.6	3	
Brexit Party	Rhondda	2019	John Watkins	3,733	12.6	4	
Brexit Party	Rother Valley	2019	Allen Cowles	6,264	12.9	3	
Brexit Party	Rotherham	2019	Paul Hague	6,125	17.2	3	
Brexit Party	Sheffield South East	2019	Kirk Kus	4,478	10.7	3	
Brexit Party	South Shields	2019	Glenn Michael Thompson	6,446	17.0	3	
Brexit Party	St Helens North	2019	Malcolm Webster	5,396	11.3	3	
Brexit Party	St Helens South and Whiston	2019	Daniel Oxley	5,353	10.6	3	
Brexit Party	Sunderland Central	2019	Viral Parikh	5,047	11.6	3	
Brexit Party	Torfaen	2019	David Thomas	5,742	15.4	3	
Brexit Party	Washington and Sunderland West	2019	Howard Brown	5,439	14.5	3	
Brexit Party	Wentworth and Dearne	2019	Stephen Cavell	7,019	16.9	3	
Brexit Party	Wigan	2019	William Molloy	5,959	13.2	3	
BNP	Barking	2005	Richard Barnbrook	4,916	16.9	3	
BNP	Barking	2010	Nick Griffin	6,620	14.8	3	
BNP	Burnley	2001	Steve Smith	4,151	11.3	4	
BNP	Burnley	2005	Len Starr	4,003	10.1	5	
BNP	Dewsbury	2005	David Exley	5,066	13.1	4	
BNP	Oldham West and Royton	2001	Nick Griffin	6,552	16.4	3	
BNP	Rotherham	2010	Marlene Guest	3,906	10.4	4	
Buckinghamshire Campaign for Democracy	Buckingham	2010	John Stevens	10,331	21.4	2	Standing against the Speaker of the House of Commons, John Bercow
Burnley First	Burnley	2005	Harry Brooks	5,786	14.8	3	
Green	Brighton Pavilion	2005	Keith Taylor	9,571	22.0	3	
Green	Lewisham Deptford	2005	Darren Johnson	3,367	11.4	4	
Green	Norwich South	2010	Adrian Ramsay	7,095	14.9	4	
Ind. Network	Slough	2024	Azhar Chohan	11,019	25.5	2	
Liberal	Liverpool West Derby	2001	Steve Radford	4,601	14.9	2	
Liberal	Liverpool West Derby	2005	Steve Radford	3,606	11.8	3	
National Democrats	West Bromwich West	1997	Steve Edwards	4,181	11.4	3	Standing against the Speaker of the House of Commons, Betty Boothroyd
NHA	Wyre Forest	2015	Richard Taylor	7,221	14.6	4	Taylor had served as MP for the constituency from 2001 to 2010
NHA	South West Surrey	2017	Louise Irvine	12,093	20.0	2	
Newham Independents	West Ham and Beckton	2024	Sophia Naqvi	7,180	19.8	2	
NI Labour	Belfast East	1974 Oct	David Bleakley	8,122	14.1	3	
Orkney and Shetland Movement	Orkney and Shetland	1987	John Goodlad	3,095	14.5	4	
People Before Profit	Belfast West	2015	Gerry Carroll	6,798	19.2	2	Represented in the Dáil
People Before Profit	Belfast West	2017	Gerry Carroll	4,132	10.2	3	Represented in the Northern Ireland Assembly and Dáil
People Before Profit	Belfast West	2019	Gerry Carroll	6,194	16.0	3	Represented in the Northern Ireland Assembly and Dáil
People Before Profit	Belfast West	2024	Gerry Carroll	5,048	12.7	2	Represented in the Northern Ireland Assembly and Dáil
People's Justice	Birmingham Sparkbrook and Small Heath	2001	Shafaq Hussain	4,770	13.0	3	
PUP	Belfast East	2001	David Ervine	3,669	10.0	4	
PUP	Belfast South	1997	David Ervine	5,687	14.4	3	
Protestant Unionist	Belfast North	1987	George Seawright	5,671	15.4	3	
Real Unionist	North Down	1987	Bob McCartney	14,467	35.4	2	
Scottish Militant Labour	Glasgow Pollok	1992	Tommy Sheridan	6,287	19.3	2	
Scottish Socialist	Glasgow Pollok	1997	Tommy Sheridan	3,639	11.1	3	
Socialist Labour	Glasgow North East	2005	Doris Kelly	4,036	14.2	3	Standing against the Speaker of the House of Commons, Michael Martin
Green	Edinburgh East and Musselburgh	2024	Amanda Grimm	4,669	10.2	3	
Green	Edinburgh North and Leith	2024	Kayleigh O'Neill	5,417	10.9	3	
Green	Glasgow North	2024	Iris Duane	4,233	12.2	3	
Green	Glasgow South	2024	Niall Christie	5,554	13.1	3	
TUV	North Antrim	2010	Jim Allister	7,114	16.8	2	
UKIP	Buckingham	2010	Nigel Farage	8,410	17.4	3	Standing against the Speaker of the House of Commons, John Bercow
UKIP	South Staffordshire	2005	Malcolm Hurst	2,675	10.4	4	Polling day delayed following death of Liberal Democrat candidate from original ballot.
Workers Party	Birmingham Hodge Hill and Solihull North	2024	James Giles	9,089	26.6	2	
Workers Party	Birmingham Yardley	2024	Jody McIntyre	10,582	29.3	2	
Workers Party	Blackburn	2024	Craig Murray	7,105	18.3	3	
Workers Party	Bolton South and Walkden	2024	Jack Khan	4,673	12.7	3	
Workers Party	Derby South	2024	Chris Williamson	5,205	13.9	3	
Workers Party	Gorton and Denton	2024	Amir Burney	3,766	10.3	4	
Workers Party	Luton North	2024	Waheed Akbar	3,914	10.1	5	
Workers Party	Manchester Rusholme	2024	Mohhamed Bilal	3,660	12.6	3	
Workers Party	Oldham East and Saddleworth	2024	Shanaz Siddique	4,647	11.1	4	
Workers Party	Peterborough	2024	Amjad Hussain	5,051	12.1	4	
Workers Party	Rochdale	2024	George Galloway	11,587	29.2	2	Galloway had served as MP for the constituency from February to May 2024

=== Miscellaneous notable results ===
==== Party wipeouts ====
Elections at which a party represented in Commons stood candidates but lost all of its seats. Parties that did not run any candidates, or whose MPs had all left and joined other parties prior to the election, are not counted.

- 2024: Alba (2 seats)^{S}, Workers' Party (1 seat)^{B}
- 2019: The Independent Group for Change (5 seats)^{S}
- 2017: SDLP (3 seats), UUP (2 seats), UKIP (1 seat)
- 2015: Alliance (1 seat), Respect (1 seat)^{B}
- 2010: Independent Kidderminster Hospital and Health Concern (1 seat), Respect (1 seat), UUP (1 seat)
- 2001: UK Unionist Party (1 seat)
- 1992: Sinn Féin (1 seat)
- 1979: Scottish Labour Party (2 seats)^{S}
- 1974 Oct: Democratic Labour (1 seat)
- 1974 Feb: Unity (2 seats)
- 1955: Sinn Féin (2 seats), Irish Labour (1 seat)
- 1950: Communist Party of Great Britain (2 seats), Irish Labour (1 seat)^{S}

^{S}: Formed by a party split over the course of that parliament.
^{B}: Seat won at a by-election, not the previous general election.

In 1997, the Conservatives saw a complete wipeout in Scotland and Wales, but won seats in England. The Welsh Liberal Democrats lost all their seats in 2015. The Welsh Conservatives once again saw a wipeout in 2024.

In some cases, party splits have led MPs to run as independents in groups that are not considered full-fledged parties. The Independents (2 MPs in 2019), Independent Social Democrats (3 MPs in 1992) and the Labour Independent Group (4 MPs in 1950) are examples of independent groupings with several members that were wiped out at general election.

==== Party leaders or deputy leaders losing their seats ====
Constituency	Election	MP	Position	Party
Alloa and Grangemouth	2024	Kenny MacAskill	Deputy leader	Alba
North Down	2024	Stephen Farry	Deputy leader	Alliance
Rochdale	2024	George Galloway	Leader	Workers Party
East Dunbartonshire	2019	Jo Swinson	Leader	Liberal Democrats
Broxtowe	2019	Anna Soubry	Leader	Change UK
Belfast North	2019	Nigel Dodds^{1}	Deputy leader	DUP
Moray	2017	Angus Robertson	Deputy leader	SNP
Belfast East	2015	Naomi Long	Deputy leader	Alliance
Bradford West	2015	George Galloway	Leader	Respect
Belfast East	2010	Peter Robinson	Leader	DUP
Upper Bann	2005	David Trimble	Leader	UUP
North Down	2001	Robert McCartney	Leader	UK Unionist
Belfast West	1992	Gerry Adams	Leader	Sinn Féin
Glasgow Govan	1992	Jim Sillars	Deputy Leader	SNP
Dundee East	1987	Gordon Wilson	Leader	SNP
Carmarthen	1979	Gwynfor Evans	Leader	Plaid Cymru
Cornwall North	1979	John Pardoe	Deputy Leader	Liberal
Fermanagh and South Tyrone	1974 October	Harry West	Leader	UUP
Belper	1970	George Brown	Deputy Leader	Labour
Carmarthen	1970	Gwynfor Evans	Leader	Plaid Cymru
Huddersfield West	1964	Donald Wade	Deputy Leader	Liberal
Anglesey	1951	Megan Lloyd George	Deputy Leader	Liberal
Caithness and Sutherland	1945	Archibald Sinclair	Leader	Liberal
Edinburgh Leith	1945	Ernest Brown	Leader	National Liberal
Darwen	1935	Herbert Samuel	Leader	Liberal
Seaham	1935	Ramsay MacDonald	Leader	National Labour
Burnley	1931	Arthur Henderson	Leader	Labour
Manchester Platting	1931	John Robert Clynes	Deputy Leader	Labour
Paisley	1924	H. H. Asquith	Leader	Liberal
East Fife	1918	H. H. Asquith	Leader	Liberal
East Mayo	1918	John Dillon	Leader	Irish Parliamentary
Manchester East	1906	Arthur Balfour	Leader	Conservative
West Ham South	1895	Keir Hardie	Leader	Ind. Labour Party
Londonderry City	1892	Justin McCarthy^{2}	Leader	Irish National Federation
South West Lancashire	1868	William Ewart Gladstone^{3}	Leader	Liberal

^{1}: Dodds was leader of the DUP at Westminster.
^{2}: McCarthy was defeated in Londonderry City, the seat for which he had sat in the previous Parliament. He also stood in North Longford, where he was elected.
^{3}: Gladstone was defeated in South West Lancashire, the seat for which he had sat in the previous Parliament. He also stood in Greenwich, where he was elected.

==== Incumbent Cabinet members losing their seats ====
Constituency	Election	MP	Position	Party
Portsmouth North	2024	Penny Mordaunt	Leader of the House of Commons	Conservative
Chichester	2024	Gillian Keegan	Secretary of State for Education	Conservative
Welwyn Hatfield	2024	Grant Shapps	Secretary of State for Defence	Conservative
Cheltenham	2024	Alex Chalk	Secretary of State for Justice	Conservative
Melksham and Devizes	2024	Michelle Donelan	Secretary of State for Science, Innovation and Technology	Conservative
Ely and East Cambridgeshire	2024	Lucy Frazer	Secretary of State for Culture, Media and Sport	Conservative
Monmouthshire	2024	David TC Davies	Secretary of State for Wales	Conservative
Forest of Dean	2024	Mark Harper	Secretary of State for Transport	Conservative
Banbury	2024	Victoria Prentis	Attorney General for England and Wales	Conservative
Plymouth Moor View	2024	Johnny Mercer	Minister of State for Veterans' Affairs	Conservative
Mid Dorset and North Poole	2024	Michael Tomlinson	Minister of State for Countering Illegal Migration	Conservative
Inverness, Nairn, Badenoch and Strathspey	2015	Danny Alexander	Chief Secretary to the Treasury	Liberal Democrats
Kingston and Surbiton	2015	Ed Davey	Secretary of State for Energy and Climate Change	Liberal Democrats
Twickenham	2015	Vince Cable	Secretary of State for Business and Trade	Liberal Democrats
Galloway and Upper Nithsdale	1997	Ian Lang	Secretary of State for Business and Trade	Conservative
Edinburgh Pentlands	1997	Malcolm Rifkind	Secretary of State for Foreign and Commonwealth Affairs	Conservative
Stirling	1997	Michael Forsyth	Secretary of State for Scotland	Conservative
Enfield Southgate	1997	Michael Portillo	Secretary of State for Defence	Conservative
Kettering	1997	Roger Freeman	Chancellor of the Duchy of Lancaster	Conservative
Braintree	1997	Tony Newton	Leader of the House of Commons	Conservative
Bristol West	1997	William Waldegrave	Chief Secretary to the Treasury	Conservative
Bath	1992	Chris Patten	Chancellor of the Duchy of Lancaster	Conservative
Hertford and Stevenage	1979	Shirley Williams	Secretary of State for Education and Science	Labour
Moray and Nairn	1974 February	Gordon Campbell	Secretary of State for Scotland	Conservative
Gloucester	1970	John Diamond	Chief Secretary to the Treasury	Labour
Doncaster	1964	Anthony Barber	Minister of Health	Conservative
Norwich South	1964	Geoffrey Rippon	Minister of Public Works	Conservative
Shipley	1950	Arthur Creech Jones	Secretary of State for the Colonies	Labour
Bournemouth East and Christchurch	1945	Brendan Bracken	First Lord of the Admiralty	Conservative
Crewe	1945	Donald Somervell	Home Secretary	Conservative
Stockton-on-Tees	1945	Harold Macmillan	Secretary of State for Air	Conservative
Cardiff East	1945	James Grigg	Secretary of State for War	Conservative
Birmingham Sparkbrook	1945	Leo Amery	Secretary of State for India and Burma	Conservative
Bassetlaw	1935	Malcolm MacDonald	Secretary of State for the Colonies	National Labour
Seaham	1935	Ramsay MacDonald	Leader of the House of Commons	National Labour
Birmingham Erdington	1929	Arthur Steel-Maitland	Minister of Labour	Conservative
Bradford East	1924	Fred Jowett	First Commissioner of Works	Labour
Salford South	1923	Anderson Montague-Barlow	Minister of Labour	Conservative
Bridgwater	1923	Robert Sanders	Minister of Agriculture and Fisheries	Conservative
Taunton	1922	Arthur Griffith-Boscawen^{2}	Minister of Health	Conservative

^{1}: Walker was defeated in Smethwick in the 1964 election. He was still appointed as Foreign Secretary and fought the 1965 Leyton by-election which he lost, resigning from Cabinet as a result.

^{2}: Griffith-Boscawen was appointed Minister of Agriculture and subsequently lost the 1921 Dudley by-election. He returned to Parliament in the 1921 Taunton by-election and was promoted to Minister of Health. Subsequently in the 1922 election, he lost his Taunton seat and was unsuccessful in returning to Parliament in the 1923 Mitcham by-election

==== Former Prime Ministers losing their seats ====
Constituency	Election	Prime Minister	Party
South West Norfolk	2024	Liz Truss	Conservative
Seaham	1935	Ramsay MacDonald	National Labour
Paisley	1924	H. H. Asquith	Liberal
East Fife	1918	H. H. Asquith	Liberal
Manchester East	1906	Arthur Balfour	Conservative

== First general elections for a new political party ==
Listed below parties which have returned MPs, either at the listed election or a later one.

- 2019: Reform UK (as "The Brexit Party")*
- 2010: TUV (in Northern Ireland)*
- 2005: Respect Party
- 2001: Independent Community and Health Concern
- 1997: UK Independence Party*
- 1997: UK Unionist Party (in Northern Ireland)
- 1992: Liberal Democrats
- 1992: Green Party of England and Wales*
- 1983: SDP
- 1983: Ulster Popular Unionist Party (in Northern Ireland)
- February 1974: Alliance Party (in Northern Ireland)*
- February 1974: Democratic Labour Party
- February 1974: Democratic Unionist Party (in Northern Ireland)
- February 1974: SDLP (in Northern Ireland)
- February 1974: Vanguard Unionist Progressive Party (in Northern Ireland)
- 1966: Republican Labour Party (in Northern Ireland – dissolved 1973)
- 1945: Common Wealth Party (only time)
- 1935: Scottish National Party*
- 1931: National Labour Party
- 1931: Empire Free Trade Crusade (only time)
- 1931: National Liberal Party (dissolved 1968)
- 1929: Plaid Cymru (in Wales)*
- 1922: Communist Party
- 1922: National Liberal Party (only time – dissolved 1923)
- 1922: Ulster Unionist Party (in Northern Ireland)
- 1918: National Democratic and Labour Party (only time – dissolved 1922)
- 1918: National Party (only time – formed 1917, dissolved 1921)
- 1918: National Socialist Party (only time – became Social Democratic Federation 1919)
- 1918: Sinn Féin (in Ireland)
- 1918: Unionist Party (in Scotland)
- January 1910: All-for-Ireland League
- January 1910: Scottish Prohibition Party*
- 1900: Labour Party (as Labour Representative Committee – renamed 1906)
- 1895: Independent Labour Party
- 1892: Irish National Federation
- 1892: Irish Unionist Alliance
- 1886: Liberal Unionist Party
- 1885: Crofters Party (in Scotland)
- 1885: Irish Parliamentary Party (aka Irish Nationalist)
- 1874: Home Rule League (in Ireland)
- 1859: Liberal Party
- 1852: Independent Irish Party
- 1841: Chartist*
- 1835: Conservative Party

Asterisked – first election where party fielded candidates but MPs elected at later general election. Otherwise all parties listed returned MPs at first contested election.

== Last general elections for defunct political parties ==
Listed below are parties which had returned MPs and which ceased to exist after the listed election:

- 2019: Independent Community & Health Concern
- 2015: Respect Party
- 2001: UK Unionist Party (in Northern Ireland)
- 1992: Ulster Popular Unionist Party (in Northern Ireland)
- 1987: Communist Party
- 1987: Liberal Party*
- 1987: SDP*
- 1983: United Ulster Unionist Party
- 1979: Democratic Labour Party
- October 1974: Vanguard Unionist Progressive Party (in Northern Ireland)
- February 1974: Independent Labour Party
- 1970: Republican Labour Party (Northern Ireland)
- 1966: National Liberal Party (formed 1931 – dissolved 1968)
- 1964: Unionist Party (in Scotland)
- 1945: Common Wealth Party
- 1935: National Labour Party
- 1931: Scottish Prohibition Party
- 1918: Irish Parliamentary Party (aka Irish Nationalist)
- 1918: Irish Unionist Alliance
- December 1910: All-for-Ireland League
- December 1910: Liberal Unionist Party
- 1895: Crofters Party (in Scotland)
- 1895: Irish National Federation
- 1880: Home Rule League (in Ireland)
- 1859: Chartists
- 1857: Independent Irish Party
- 1857: Radicals (before amalgamation into Liberal Party which continued to be nicknamed "Radicals")
- 1857: Whig Party
- 1832: Tory Party (before reorganisation as Conservative Party which continued to be nicknamed "Tories")

* After the Liberal Party and SDP merged to form the Liberal Democrats, some members opposed to the merger formed new parties, the continuation Liberal Party and continuation Social Democratic Party. These parties are legally distinct from their predecessors and have never won a seat in Parliament.

== General elections following electoral developments ==
Participation in, and outcome of, general elections can be influenced by changes in electoral law or practice.

- 2024: first general election following:

- Repeal of the Fixed-term Parliaments Act 2011
- Introduction of voter identification laws in the Elections Act 2022
- Extension of franchise to all registered voters overseas, regardless of length of residence

- 2019: first general election held because an Act of Parliament specifically called for one (the Early Parliamentary General Election Act 2019, enacted to bypass the Fixed-term Parliaments Act 2011)
- 2017: first general election held because MPs voted for an early election under the Fixed-term Parliaments Act 2011
- 2015: first general election scheduled automatically under the Fixed-term Parliaments Act 2011
- 2010: first general election following lowering of age of candidacy to 18
- 2001: first general election in which hereditary peers could vote, and stand as MPs without disclaiming peerage
- 1987: first general election in which British citizens living overseas could vote
- 1970: first general election following reduction of adult voting age to 18
- 1964: first general election hereditary peers were allowed to stand as MPs if peerage disclaimed
- 1955: first general election in which all seats were contested
- 1950: first general election following:

- extension of postal voting to civilian population
- abolition of university constituencies
- abolition of plural voting
- abolition of remaining two-member seat constituencies

- 1929: first general election where all adult women (aged 21 upwards) were enfranchised
- 1922: first general election following secession of Southern Ireland from the UK
- 1918: first general election in which:

- women (aged 21 upwards) were eligible only to stand and (aged 30 upwards) were enfranchised
- all adult males (aged 21 upwards) were enfranchised
- polling was held on single day
- postal voting (for armed forces personnel) was allowed

- 1885: first general election held subject to the Corrupt and Illegal Practices Prevention Act 1883
- 1874: first general election held with secret ballots
- 1868: first general election following enfranchisement of all male heads of household under the Second Reform Act
- 1832: first general election following Great Reform Act which:

- established a unified householder franchise
- comprehensively redistributed parliamentary seats, abolishing many rotten boroughs
- established 21 years as the youngest age of candidacy (reduced to 18 in 2006)

- 1830: first general election in which Roman Catholics could stand as MPs (significant in Ireland)
- 1801: first general election in which Irish voters elected MPs to Westminster, following the Act of Union, on same footing to those in England, Scotland and Wales

== See also ==
- List of United Kingdom MPs with the shortest service
- Records of members of parliament of the United Kingdom
- Swing (politics)
- United Kingdom by-election records
- United Kingdom European Parliament election records
- United Kingdom general elections overview
