= United Kingdom European Parliament election records =

This is an annotated list of notable records from United Kingdom elections to the European Parliament, which were held from 1979 through 2019.

European Parliament elections in Great Britain used two very different electoral systems. From 1979 until 1994, elections were conducted using first past the post (FPTP), with Great Britain divided into numerous single member constituencies. From 1999 through 2019, however, mainland elections used the d'Hondt method of proportional representation (PR), with 11 multi-member constituencies corresponding to Scotland, Wales and the regions of England. Northern Ireland always used the single transferable vote system.

As a result, comparisons between these two types elections are problematic, and the voting system will be noted by each record.

== Numerical records ==
=== Largest swings ===
==== National two-party swings ====
Swing between the largest party at the previous election and the largest party at the next, or the second-largest party if there was no change.

- 2019 election (PR) – 27.0% swing from UKIP to Brexit^{1}
- 1999 election (PR) – 11.5% swing from Labour to Conservative^{2}
- 2014 election (PR) – 7.5% swing from Conservative to UKIP
- 1984 election (FPTP) – 6.4% swing from Conservative to Labour
- 1994 election (FPTP) – 5.3% swing from Conservative to Labour
- 1989 election (FPTP) – 4.5% swing from Conservative to Labour
- 2009 election (PR) – 3.8% swing from Labour to Conservative
- 2004 election (PR) – 1.6% swing from Conservative to Labour

===== National Labour-Conservative (Butler) swings =====
- 1999 election (PR) – 11.5% swing from Labour to Conservative^{2}
- 2014 election (PR) – 6.8% swing from Conservative to Labour^{3}
- 1984 election (FPTP) – 6.4% swing from Conservative to Labour
- 1989 election (FPTP) – 5.3% swing from Conservative to Labour
- 1989 election (FPTP) – 4.5% swing from Conservative to Labour
- 2009 election (PR) – 3.8% swing from Labour to Conservative^{3}
- 2019 election (PR) – 2.2% swing from Conservative to Labour^{3}
- 2004 election (PR) – 1.6% swing from Conservative to Labour

^{1} A majority of UKIP MEPs defected to the Brexit Party over the course of the 2014-2019 Parliament, and both UKIP in 2014 and the Brexit Party in 2019 were led by Nigel Farage.
^{2} The first election held under PR, swing is compared to previous FPTP election.
^{3} At least one major party was not in the top two.

=== Largest fall in percentage share of vote ===
==== National ====
- 2019 election (PR): UKIP, -23.4%
- 1999 election (PR): Labour, -16.4%^{1}
- 2019 election (PR): Conservatives, -15.1%
- 1989 election (FPTP) Liberal Democrats, -12.6%
- 1994 election (FPTP) Green Party of England and Wales, -11.5%^{2}
- 2019 election (PR): Labour, -10.8%

^{1} The first election held under PR, fall is compared to previous FPTP election.
^{2} Compared to the UK Green Party in 1989.

=== Largest increase in percentage share of vote ===
==== National ====
- 2019 election (PR): Brexit, +30.5%
- 1989 election (FPTP): Green Party, +13.4%
- 2019 election (PR): Liberal Democrats, +13.0%
- 2014 election (PR): UKIP, +10.6%
- 1994 election (FPTP): Liberal Democrats, +10.2%

=== Largest numbers of seats ===
After the introduction of PR, the number of seats correlated closely with national vote share, and no party ever won a majority. Under FPTP, the number of seats won can diverge significantly from national vote share. In the following elections, all FPTP, a single party won a majority:

- 1979 election (FPTP): Conservative, 60 of 81 (majority of 20)
- 1994 election (FPTP): Labour, 62 of 87 (majority of 18)
- 1989 election (FPTP): Labour, 45 of 81 (majority of 4)
- 1984 election (FPTP): Conservative, 45 of 81 (majority of 4)

Since 1999, the following elections saw one party take at least a third of the available seats:

- 1999 election (PR): Conservative, 36 of 87
- 2019 election (PR): Brexit, 29 of 73
- 2004 election (PR): Conservative, 27 of 78
- 2009 election (PR): Conservative, 26 of 72
- 2014 election (PR): UKIP, 24 of 73

=== Highest turnout ===
Turnout was historically low in UK EP elections compared to other European countries.

==== National ====
- 2004 election (PR): 38.5%
- 2019 election (PR): 37.0%
- 1989 election (FPTP): 36.4%
- 1994 election (FPTP): 36.4%

=== Lowest turnout ===
==== National ====
- 1999 election (PR): 24.0%
- 1979 election (FPTP): 32.4%
- 1984 election (FPTP): 32.6%

== Party records ==
=== Largest national vote share under PR ===
For parties that returned at least one MEP:

| Party | Election | % Share | Stood in |
|---|---|---|---|
| Conservative | 1999 election | 33.5 | Great Britain |
| Brexit Party | 2019 election | 30.5 | Great Britain |
| UKIP | 2014 election | 26.6 | Great Britain |
| Liberal Democrats | 2019 election | 19.6 | Great Britain |
| Labour | 1999 election | 26.3 | Great Britain |
| Green | 2019 election | 11.8 | England and Wales |
| BNP | 2009 election | 6.0 | Great Britain |
| SNP | 2019 election | 3.6 | Scotland |
| Plaid Cymru | 1999 election | 1.7 | Wales |

The use of multiple preference votes makes comparisons with Northern Irish parties difficult.

=== Smallest national vote share under PR ===
For parties that returned at least one MEP:

| Party | Election | % Share | Stood in |
|---|---|---|---|
| Brexit Party | 2019 election | 30.5 | Great Britain |
| Labour | 2019 election | 13.6 | Great Britain |
| Conservative | 2019 election | 8.8 | Great Britain |
| Liberal Democrats | 2014 election | 6.6 | Great Britain |
| Green | 1999 election | 5.3 | England and Wales |
| UKIP | 2019 election | 3.2^{1} | Great Britain |
| SNP | 2004 election | 1.4 | Scotland |
| BNP | 1999 election | 1.0 | Great Britain |
| Plaid Cymru | 2014 election | 0.7 | Wales |

^{1}: Party failed to return any MEPs

=== Largest national vote share under FPTP ===
For parties that returned at least one MEP:

| Party | Election | % Share | Stood in |
|---|---|---|---|
| Conservative | 1979 election | 48.4 | Great Britain |
| Labour | 1994 election | 42.6 | Great Britain |
| Liberal Democrats | 1994 election | 16.1 | Great Britain |
| SNP | 2014 election | 3.1 | Scotland |

The Green Party won 14.5% of the vote in 1989, still the best Green performance at any nationwide election, but failed to win any seats due to the FPTP system. Similarly, the SDP–Liberal Alliance took 18.5% of the vote in 1984, again without winning a seat.

== See also ==
- United Kingdom general election records
- United Kingdom by-election records
