= 1990 Bradford North by-election =

UK Parliamentary by-election

← 1987	8 November 1990	1992 →

Constituency of Bradford North
- Turnout: 53.4% (▼19.3%)
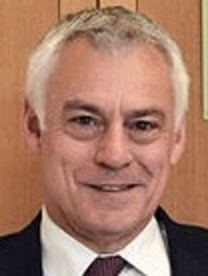
	First party	Second party	Third party
	Lab		Con
Candidate	Terry Rooney	David Ward	Timothy Jones
Party	Labour	Liberal Democrats	Conservative
Popular vote	18,619	9,105	6,048
Percentage	51.7%	25.3%	16.8%
Swing	▲8.8%	▲7.6%	▼22.7%
MP before election
Pat Wall
Labour
Subsequent MP
Terry Rooney
Labour

A 1990 by-election was held for the United Kingdom House of Commons for one Member of Parliament (MP) in the constituency of Bradford North, in West Yorkshire, England, on 8 November 1990 owing to the death of the sitting MP Pat Wall.

Bradford is a city based on heavy engineering and textile industries. The Bradford North seat had been held for one Parliament by the Conservatives from 1983 to 1987, when the Labour candidate Pat Wall (a member of the Militant tendency) saw his vote split by a strong SDP challenge and by the sitting Labour MP Ben Ford standing as an Independent. (The successful Conservative, Geoffrey Lawler, had only 34.3% of the vote.)

The by-election took place when Margaret Thatcher was highly unpopular and in her last month as Prime Minister. Declining support for the Conservative government (which improved after John Major succeeded Thatcher near the end of November 1990) was reflected by the fact that the Conservative candidate in this by-election only attracted just over one in six of the total votes cast.

The successful Labour candidate Terry Rooney became the first Mormon to be elected to the House of Commons.

Bradford North by-election 1990
Party	Candidate	Votes	%	±%
Labour	Terry Rooney	18,619	51.7	+8.9
Liberal Democrats	David Ward	9,105	25.3	+7.6
Conservative	Joy Atkin	6,048	16.8	−22.7
Islamic Party	David Pidcock	800	2.2	New
Green	Michael Knott	447	1.2	New
National Front	Robert Tenney	305	0.8	New
Independent	Joseph Floyd	219	0.6	New
Monster Raving Loony	Wild Willi Beckett	210	0.6	New
Liberal	Noel Nowosielski	187	0.5	N/A
Ind. Conservative	Malcolm Wigglesworth	89	0.2	New
Majority		9,514	26.4	+23.1
Turnout		36,029	53.4	−19.3
Labour hold		Swing		

== See also ==
- List of United Kingdom by-elections
- List of parliamentary constituencies in West Yorkshire
