= Michael Clapham (industrialist) =

British industrialist

Sir Michael Clapham KBE

President of Confederation of British Industry
- In office 1972–1974

Chairman of IMI plc
- In office 1974–1981

Chairman of Council for National Academic Awards
- In office 1971–1977

Personal details
- Born: 17 January 1912
- Died: 11 November 2002 (aged 90) London, England
- Citizenship: British
- Spouse: Elisabeth Rea
- Relations: Sir John Clapham (father); Walter Rea, 1st Baron Rea (father-in-law); Philip Rea, 2nd Baron Rea (brother-in-law); Nicolas Rea, 3rd Baron Rea (nephew)
- Children: Adam, Marcus, Antonia, Giles
- Education: King's College, Cambridge
- Occupation: Industrialist Printer
- Known for: Pharmaceuticals; Printing

Sir Michael John Sinclair Clapham KBE (17 January 1912 – 11 November 2002) was a prominent British Industrialist who served as president of the Confederation of British Industry (CBI) in the mid-1970s during a period of significant economic turmoil and as a senior executive of ICI throughout the 1960s and early 1970s. As CBI president he witnessed the fall of the administration of Edward Heath in the wake of the miners' strike, and the re-emergence of the Labour Party under Harold Wilson. He was directly involved, along with CBI director-general Campbell Adamson, in intense and volatile debate on voluntary pay restraint and price controls with Health and trade union leaders.

Clapham who was a classical scholar and a master printer by trade, also invented an isotope diffusion barrier whilst working on silk screen printing techniques during World War II which led to him being seconded to the Tube Alloys Project pursuing the development of the atom bomb.

== Early life ==
Clapham (born on 17 January 1912), the son of Sir John Clapham, who was Vice-Provost and Professor of Economic History at King's College, Cambridge. Michael was a chorister at King's, and was then educated at Marlborough and at his father's college, where he read Classics. Unusually, given his academic background, after coming down from Cambridge in 1933 he became a printer's apprentice at Cambridge University Press, reportedly earning 10 shillings a week.

== Career ==
Clapham moved from Cambridge to Bradford where he worked for printer Lund Humphries, and then, in 1938, to the Kynoch Press in Birmingham which was part of the huge ICI conglomerate. He was allegedly told, when he commenced his employment that he would struggle to advance in the company as he was neither a chemist nor an engineer and yet he was to remain in the employ of the chemicals giant, in a variety of capacities, until 1974.

During the war he invented an isotope diffusion barrier, and consequently found himself seconded for four years to the Tube Alloys Project which was Britain's first attempt to build an atomic bomb. He had been seconded from Kynoch to become nightwatchman at a munitions factory. There he became friendly with an assistant research manager called SS Smith who expressed an interest in the photo-engraving process used to produce ink for newspapers. Smith asked him if the process could be used to create a very thin membrane with many microscopic holes etched through it. Traditionally the fine mesh required for photo engraving was produced mechanically but Clapham perfected a photo-reduction and electrolytic method to produce membrane-like metal plates with thousands of invisibly small holes. He was then asked if he would be able to produce these plates on a vast scale and when he said it would be possible he found himself whisked off to the Tube Alloys Project. The application of his technique to isotope diffusion separation was realised and Clapham realised the enormous significance of what he was involved in. He had effectively created an efficient way of filtering out enough of the explosive elements of uranium from its non-explosive isotopes to make a bomb, something physicists had been struggling with for some time. It was a leap forward that would eventually make the atom bomb possible. Clapham never regretted his involvement in the project believing the bomb to be a necessary evil required to bring about an end to the human carnage of the war.

After the war he was appointed personnel director of the ICI group's metal division and then became managing director of the division in 1952 at the age of 40. It was at this time he became involved in education serving on both Birmingham city's education committee and on the council of the University of Birmingham. His interest in education also led to a position on the Council for National Academic Awards. He joined in 1964, and was chairman from 1971 to 1977. He was awarded an honorary MA in history by Aston University in 1973.

In 1959 he was appointed chairman of IMI (formerly Imperial Metal Industries) a subsidiary of ICI which became a separate public company. He joined the full ICI board in 1961 and became deputy chairman in 1968 with responsibility for overseas development. He travelled widely, particularly in the Far East and Australasia.

In 1966 he was offered the managing directorship of the newly formed Labour backed Industrial Reorganisation Corporation (IRC) by chairman Sir Frank Kearton. ICI's chairman Sir Paul Chambers however saw IRC as a competitor and did not let Clapham go. He did however, become a non-executive director. He was also a member of the National Economic Development Council for five years from 1971.

Clapham had a reputation as a liberal-minded reformer and problem solver. He was in the running for the chairmanship of ICI in 1971 but the board instead opted for Sir Jack Callard, an engineer who had made his name as with ICI's Dulux paint brand. In the same year Clapham became deputy president of the CBI, becoming president a year later.

Almost immediately he was involved in talks with Heath and the union leaders along with Campbell Adamson to try to prevent industrial action. The CBI team's impression was that Heath showed a good deal more consideration and deference to the unions and to TUC leader Vic Feather. However, neither Heath nor Feather could exert much influence over hard line union men Jack Jones and Hugh Scanlon, and little progress was made. When the miners converted their overtime ban into a strike, Heath called a general election. Two days before polling day Adamson addressed a conference organised by the Industrial Society at which he was asked what the Conservatives should do, if re-elected, about the controversial Industrial Relations Act. Adamson replied "if I were them I would try to get close to the unions and hammer out something better", going on to say that amendment of the Act was not possible because "it is so surrounded by hatred that we must have a more honest try at another Act".

Adamson did not realise that his words were being recorded by the BBC. Clapham dissociated the organisation from Adamson's view, and other industrialists were heavily critical. Late on Wednesday 27 February, Adamson offered his resignation to Clapham (the news did not become public until the following day); Clapham refused to accept it, writing back that Adamson was "perhaps uniquely qualified to organize" the CBI and deal with government. However Adamson insisted and Clapham undertook to consult with members. In the meantime the election resulted in the surprise defeat of Edward Heath; the incoming government swiftly abolished the Industrial Relations Act. In his memoirs Heath disputed that Adamson could have been unaware he was being recorded, and wrote that "If Campbell Adamson had wanted Labour to win, he could not have worked more effectively on their behalf".

Clapham was courteous and witty in face-to-face dealings and an effective and strident public speaker. He spoke of the CBI "straining every sinew" to find a middle way in the tripartite anti-inflation talks. As the situation deteriorated in 1973, and the Government struggled to win union support for its Price and Pay Code, Clapham dismissed profit restraints on industry as "strangling the goose that used to lay the golden eggs", pointing out that profits were already substantially lower than they had been a decade earlier.

After retiring from the ICI board in 1974, he was chairman of BPM Holdings; deputy chairman of Lloyds Bank; and a director of Grindlay's Bank, and of Associated Communications Corp, the Australian media group. He was also a member of General Motors' European advisory council. He was also president of the Institute of Printing, and wrote scholarly articles on the history of the trade.

In the Queen's Birthday Honours 1972 Clapham was appointed as a Knight Commander of the Most Excellent Order of the British Empire

== Personal life ==
Clapham married The Hon. Elisabeth Russell Rea (2 May 1911 – 1994) who he met at Cambridge, on 18 May 1935. She was the daughter of Walter Rea, 1st Baron Rea and Evelyn Muirhead. Her brother was Philip Rea, 2nd Baron Rea. The Claphams had three sons; Adam a television producer, Marcus and Giles and a daughter, Antonia. Their nephew is Nicolas Rea, 3rd Baron Rea. Clapham spent much of his life including his later years living in Hill Street just off Berkeley Square in Mayfair where he became president of the Resident's Association. He enjoyed sailing and had a ketch in the Mediterranean and a narrow boat on the Grand Union Canal.

== Works ==
- "Printing" in A History of Technology, Vol 2. From the Renaissance to the Industrial Revolution, edd. Charles Singer et al. (Oxford 1957)
- Multinational enterprises and nation states – Stamp Memorial Lecture (Athlone Press, 1975)
