= Betty Rea =

English sculptor and educationalist

- Born: Elizabeth Marion Bevan; 6 August 1904; London, England
- Died: 2 April 1965 (aged 60)
- Education: Downe House School; Regent Street Polytechnic; Royal College of Art
- Known for: Sculpture
- Spouse: James Rea (m. 1926; div. 1942)

Elizabeth Marion Rea (née Bevan; 6 August 1904 – 2 April 1965) was an English sculptor and educationalist.

== Early life and education ==
Betty Rea was born in London in 1904. Her father was Dr. Arthur Bevan and her mother's maiden name was Barnardo; Dr.Thomas John Barnardo was her great-uncle.

She was educated at Downe House School (in Kent at that time) and began to study painting at the Regent Street Polytechnic in 1922, almost at once changing to sculpture and transferring her studies to the Royal College of Art in 1924. Her teacher there was Ernest A. Cole. Henry Moore was a student teacher at the RCA at that time, and became a friend.

In 1926 she married law student James Russell Rea (1902–1954), whose father became Baron Rea, a Liberal peer. Together they had two sons, Nicolas and Julian, who were born in 1928 and 1931. The couple divorced in 1942.

== Life and work ==
During the 1930s, partly influenced by her friendship with Professor John Desmond Bernal, Betty Rea was greatly involved in anti-fascist, leftwing politics. She was a founding member of Artists' International Association (AIA), and served as secretary from 1934 to 1936. Founded in 1933, the AIA sought to oppose imperialism, fascism and colonialism through art.

Rea was also an active member of the Communist Party Artists group, the Artists’ Refugee Committee, as well as Chair of the Arts Peace Campaign.

Communal care for children and their education was one of Rea's socialist interests. In 1934, following a trip to the Soviet Union, she published an article, 'Children and Art in Soviet Russia', which praised the educational advances being made in Russia.

In 1937 she worked upon a mural in the Unofficial Peace Pavilion at the Paris World Fair.

At the outset of the Second World War, Rea's personal life eclipsed her role as an exhibiting artist. For most of the war, Rea taught painting and model-making in evacuated children's homes in Huntingdon and other villages in the surrounding Cambridgeshire countryside. She set up home with her colleague, Nan Youngman, first in a caravan in the grounds of Hinchingbrooke House, then in Godmanchester, and in 1946 at 'Papermills' in Cambridge. The children's paintings from this time were included in several British Council exhibitions sent abroad and some are illustrated in Herbert Read's "Education Through Art".

It was not until 1942 that Rea would return to creating sculpture, when the members of the AIA, encouraged by the British government, staged the exhibition For Liberty to increase wartime propaganda and raise the public's spirits. Rea's sculpture New World was displayed in a section of the exhibition under the thematic title of 'this is how we are fighting'; the other two sections of the exhibition investigated the themes 'this is what will happen if we lose the war' and 'this is what we are fighting for'.

From 1949 Rea taught sculpture at Homerton College, continuing this part-time until 1964, she also worked for some years as craft examiner for the Cambridge Local Examinations Syndicate.

Betty Rea died in April 1965. At the time of her death she was working on a clay sculpture commissioned for Hockerill College, to be cast in bronze.

== Works ==
Betty Rea's 1959 Stretching Figure (bronze resin), was described by Gillian Whiteley as "expressing the diverse emotions, activities, and grace of youth". It is held by the Herbert Art Gallery and Museum, Coventry.

Her last work, Swimmers, completed posthumously by John W Mills, stands in the grounds of Cambridge Parkside swimming pool.

Rea's work is held in many collections, including Leeds Museums and Galleries; various education authority collections; Cambridge Institute of Education; University of Warwick; Hockerill College, Bishop's Stortford; Harlow Art Trust; Herbert Museum and Art Gallery, Coventry.

== Exhibitions ==
=== Solo exhibitions ===
- Betty Rea, 14 June – 9 July, Zwemmer Gallery, London.
- Betty Rea 1904–1965, – 3 June July 1965, Zwemmer Gallery, London.
- Memorial Exhibition, 1966, Cambridge Society of Painters and Sculptors, Arts Council Gallery, Cambridge.
- Betty Rea 1904–1965, May 1985, Royston Museum.

=== Group exhibitions ===
- Artists for Peace, Woburn Place, London 1952.
- Co-organised Looking at People, Whitworth Art Gallery, Manchester 1955 and expanded version at South London Gallery, which then travelled to Moscow in 1957.
- Artists of Fame and Promise, Leicester Galleries, London 1956, 57.
- Women's International Art Club exhibition 1957.
- Three Humanist Sculptors, Zwemmer Gallery, London 1960.

Betty Rea exhibited annually with Cambridge Society of Painters and Sculptors from 1955. Posthumously, her work was included in the AIA exhibition, curated by Lynda Morris, held at the Museum of Modern Art in Oxford in 1983.

More recently, Betty Rea's sculpture was the subject of research at the Henry Moore Institute, Leeds in 2003, resulting in the exhibition A Fine Tomorrow: Sculpture and Socialism in mid-century Britain (29 May – 29 August 2003), with a companion publication of the same name by Matthew Withey.
