= Baron Rea =

Barony in the Peerage of the United Kingdom

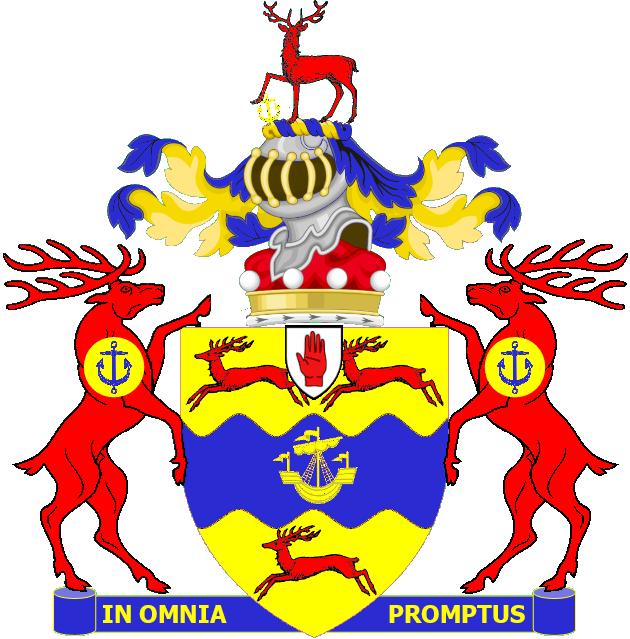
Rea's Armorial Achievement Escutcheon: Or on a fess wavy Azure between three stags courant Gules a lymphad sails furled of the field. Crest: A stag at gaze Gules resting the dexter fore-leg on an anchor Or. Supporters: On either side a stag Gules each charged on the shoulder with a bezant thereon an anchor Azure. Motto: In Omnia Promptus

Baron Rea, of Eskdale in the County of Cumberland, is a title in the Peerage of the United Kingdom. It was created in 1937 for the businessman and Liberal politician Sir Walter Rea, 1st Baronet, who had earlier represented Scarborough, Bradford North and Dewsbury in the House of Commons. He had already been created a Baronet, of Eskdale in the County of Cumberland, in 1935. He was succeeded by his eldest son, the second Baron. During the Second World War he served as personal staff officer to Brigadier Colin Gubbins, the Head of SOE, a key British intelligence and guerrilla operations agency. Lord Rea served as Leader of the Liberal Party in the House of Lords from 1955 to 1967. His daughter, the Right Hon. Ann Felicity Rea, married SOE veteran Malcolm Munthe in 1945. His nephew, the third Baron, who succeeded in 1981, was a physician. He was one of the ninety elected hereditary peers elected to remain in the House of Lords after the passing of the House of Lords Act 1999, and sat on the Labour benches. As of 2020 the titles are held by his son, the fourth Baron, who succeeded his father in that year.

Russell Rea, father of the first Baron, was also a Member of Parliament and had been admitted to the Privy Council in 1909. The sculptor Betty Rea was the wife of the Hon. James Rea, younger son of the first Baron. They were the parents of the third Baron.

The family surname and the title of the barony, Rea, is pronounced "Ree".

== Barons Rea (1937) ==
- Walter Russell Rea, 1st Baron Rea (1873–1948)
- Philip Russell Rea, 2nd Baron Rea (1900–1981)
- (John) Nicolas Rea, 3rd Baron Rea (1928–2020)
- Matthew James Rea, 4th Baron Rea (b. 1956)

The heir presumptive is the present holder's brother Hon. Daniel William Rea (b. 1958), whose heir is his eldest son William Alexander Rea (b. 1991)
