= Robert Pennington =

Robert Pennington may refer to:

- Robert Pennington, 17th century British aristocrat affiliated with Charles II of England; owner of Southside House
- Robert B. Pennington, US Marine charged in 2006 with crimes relating to the abduction and murder of an Iraqi civilian
