= Wallhead =

Wallhead is a surname. Notable people with the surname include:

- Jim Wallhead (born 1984), British mixed martial artist
- Muriel Nichol (née Wallhead, 1893–1983), English politician, daughter of R. C.
- R. C. Wallhead (1869–1934), British politician
