= Patrick Wall (disambiguation) =

Patrick Wall or Pat Wall may refer to:

- Pat Wall (1933–1990), British Marxist politician and Labour MP
- Patrick D. Wall (1925–2001), British neuroscientist
- Patrick Wall (1916–1998), British Conservative politician and Yorkshire MP, 1954–1987
