= Malcolm Munthe =

British soldier, writer and curator

Major Malcolm Grane Ludovic Martin Munthe MC (30 January 1910 – 24 November 1995) was a British soldier, writer, and curator, and son of the Swedish doctor and writer Axel Munthe and his English second wife Hilda Pennington-Mellor.

== Early life and Second World War ==
Brought up between the Swedish court, Italy, and Britain, where his mother owned two houses, Hellens in Herefordshire and Southside House in Wimbledon, Malcolm Munthe became a British citizen at the outbreak of World War II in order to fight, since Sweden would be neutral throughout the war. He was educated at King's College School, Wimbledon, and abroad.

He was assigned to the Gordon Highlanders for no other reason than his first name's Scottish roots. Later recruited to the Special Operations Executive, he worked in Scandinavia - both behind enemy lines in occupied Norway and in neutral Sweden - as a spy and saboteur; after the war, he claimed he had been responsible for the explosion in a German munitions train, though the veracity is suspect at best. After a harrowing escape, recounted in his wartime memoir Sweet is War, he was put in charge of SOE's activities in Southern Italy, where he participated in the Anzio landings.

In Scandinavia, Munthe had established a network of 'Friends' which he called the "Red Horse", in imitation of the Baroness Orczy's Scarlet Pimpernel. In Southern Italy, he took the mimicry further, dressing as a (large) old lady to smuggle a radio transmitter past German lines and coordinate SOE activity in the occupied zone. Munthe was also instrumental in the rescue of liberal philosopher Benedetto Croce and his family, held captive in Sorrento, and their flight to Capri where his father Axel Munthe's house Villa San Michele provided shelter. Munthe was decorated with the Military Cross for bravery.

== Postwar life ==
After the war, Munthe continued to work in the military, and became active in social projects (described in his book The Bunty Boys). In 1945, he married the Hon. Ann Felicity Rea (born 15 January 1923), whom he met through her father Philip Russell Rea, 2nd Baron Rea, who was personal staff officer to Brigadier Colin Gubbins (the Head of SOE), and later leader of the Liberal party in the British House of Lords. They had three children, Adam John Munthe (1946–2026), Guy Sebastian Munthe (1948–1992) and Katriona Periwinkle Philippa Pennington Munthe-Lindgren (b.1955).

After an abortive attempt at a political career with the Conservative Party, Munthe re-directed his work towards maintaining the family homes in England, Sweden and Italy. He sold his father's remaining properties on Capri (the Villa Materita, inter alia), and bought the Castello di Lunghezza, a 108-room castle outside Rome. He opened Hildasholm, the property Axel Munthe had built for his wife Hilda in central Sweden, to the public, and did the same for Hellens and Southside House in England under the auspices of the Pennington-Mellor-Munthe Charity Trust, chaired until his death in 2026 by his eldest son Adam Munthe.

Munthe dedicated his later years to running those properties, and writing, including a history of Hellens, Hellen's, Much Marcle, Herefordshire and Special Forces Club.

Described by Sir Angus Ogilvy as 'the last true English eccentric', he died at Southside House in November 1995.
