= Eugene Ramsden, 1st Baron Ramsden =

British politician (1883-1955)

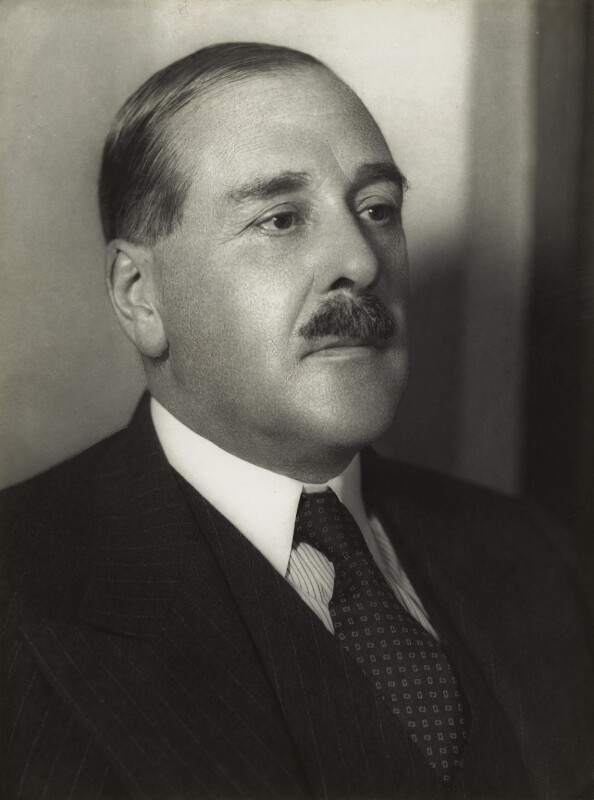
Ramsden in 1938

Eugene Joseph Squire Hargreaves Ramsden, 1st Baron Ramsden OBE (2 February 1883 – 9 August 1955), known as Sir Eugene Ramsden, Bt between 1938 and 1945, was a Conservative Party politician in the United Kingdom.

== Background ==
Ramsden was the son of James Ramsden, of The Wheatleys in Gomersal, Yorkshire, and Mary Jane (née Hargreaves). He was head of James Ramsden Ltd. He also fought in the First World War and was appointed an OBE in 1919.

== Political career ==
Ramsden stood unsuccessfully for the Spen Valley constituency in West Yorkshire at the 1923 general election, held by the senior Liberal John Simon. He came third, with 22% of the votes, behind Labour. He did not stand again in Spen Valley, and at the 1924 general election he contested the marginal seat of Bradford North, where the Liberal Walter Rea had been elected in 1923 with a majority of only 173. Ramsden won the seat with a majority of 2,017, but was defeated at the 1929 general election by Labour's Norman Angell.

The Labour vote collapsed at the 1931 general election after Prime Minister Ramsay MacDonald split his party and formed a National Government. Ramsden stood again in Bradford North, ousting Angell with a majority of over 18,000 votes. He held the seat comfortably at the 1935 election, and represented Bradford North until he retired from the House of Commons at the 1945 general election. Ramsden was knighted in 1933 and made a Baronet, of Birkenshaw in the West Riding of the County of York, in 1938. After leaving the House of Commons in 1945, he was elevated to the peerage as Baron Ramsden, of Birkenshaw in the West Riding of the County of York.

Ramsden was a council member of the British Council, and is named in the council's charter, granted in 1940. He was described in 1927 as a "whole-hearted and keen Imperialist".

== Personal life ==
Lord Ramsden married Margaret Enid, daughter of Frank Eugene Withey and widow of Major George Wells Farwell, in 1919. He died in August 1955, aged 72, after which the baronetcy and barony became extinct.

== Arms ==
Coat of arms of Eugene Ramsden, 1st Baron Ramsden
Crest A ram’s head caboshed the horns enchained Or. Escutcheon Gules in chief two roses Argent barbed and seeded Proper and in base a ram’s head caboshed Or. Supporters On the dexter side a grey parrot and on the sinister side a Cairn terrier both Proper. Motto Fortiter In Re

Parliament of the United Kingdom
Preceded by Walter Rea	Member of Parliament for Bradford North; 1924–1929	Succeeded by Norman Angell
Preceded by Norman Angell	Member of Parliament for Bradford North; 1931–1945	Succeeded by Muriel Nichol
Peerage of the United Kingdom
New creation	Baron Ramsden; 1945–1955	Extinct
Baronetage of the United Kingdom
New creation	Baronet (of Birkenshaw); 1938–1955	Extinct
