= Castello di Lunghezza =

Building in Rome, Italy

- Lunghezza, Italy
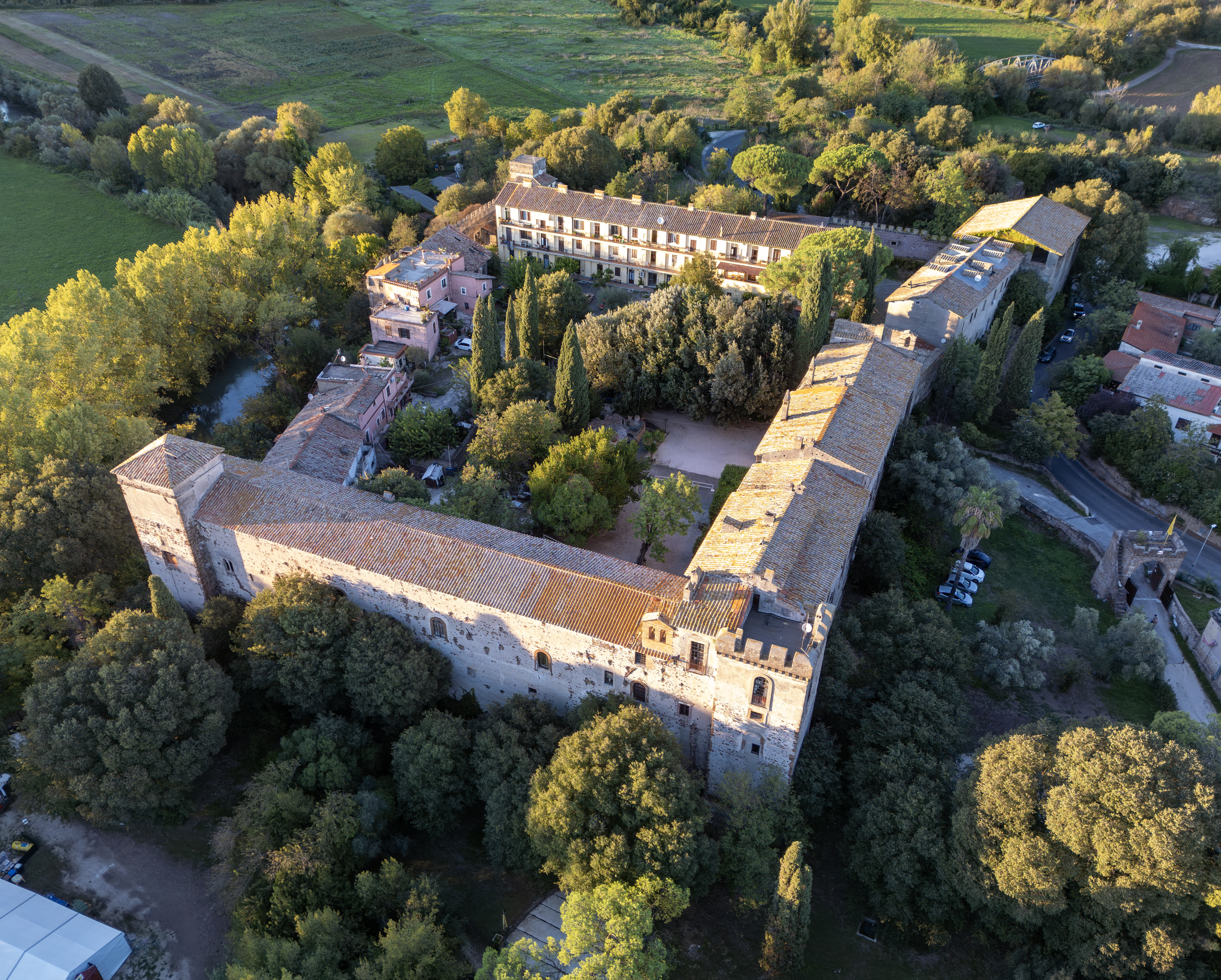

Site information
- Owner: Private
- Open to the public: See Schedule

Location
- Coordinates: 41°55′30″N 12°40′1″E

Site history
- Built: before 752
- Built by: Monastery of S. Salvatore

The Castello di Lunghezza ("Lunghezza Castle") is a medieval fortification situated roughly 20 kilometers (12 mi) east of Rome, Italy. It lies in Municipio VIII of Rome, and sits on the site of the ancient town of Collatia.

== History ==
It was constructed in the year 761 AD and was ruled over by the Poli Family for several generations. In the 13th century, the Polis fell out of favor with Pope Boniface VIII when they gave all the lands around the castle to a local monastery. After some dispute, the papacy gained control of the land and it was bestowed upon the Orsinis, a family of Roman nobles. Throughout the early 20th century, it changed hands in various English families a number of times.

In the 1950s, the castle was purchased by British curator Malcolm Munthe, who sought to restore it and open it to the public.
