= Sir William Taylor, 1st Baronet =

British politician (1902-1972)

Sir William Johnson Taylor, 1st Baronet CBE (23 October 1902 – 26 July 1972) was a Conservative and National Liberal Party politician in the United Kingdom.

At the 1945 general election he stood unsuccessfully in the Bradford East constituency in West Yorkshire, losing in that year's landslide by a wide margin to the Labour Party candidate Frank McLeavy. After boundary changes, he stood at the 1950 general election in the neighbouring Bradford North, where he unseated the Labour MP Muriel Nichol.

Taylor served under Harold Macmillan as Parliamentary Secretary to the Ministry of Supply between 1957 and 1959, when the post was abolished, and as Under-Secretary of State for Air between 1959 and 1962. He held Bradford North until his defeat at 1964 general election by Labour's Ben Ford. He was created a Baronet, of Cawthorne in the West Riding of the County of York, in 1963. He died in July 1972, aged 69, when the baronetcy became extinct.

Parliament of the United Kingdom
Preceded by Muriel Nichol	Member of Parliament for Bradford North; 1950–1964	Succeeded by Ben Ford
Political offices
Preceded by Ian Harvey	Parliamentary Secretary to the Ministry of Supply; 1957–1959	Office abolished
Preceded by Airey Neave	Under-Secretary of State for Air; 1959–1962	Succeeded by Julian Ridsdale
Baronetage of the United Kingdom
New creation	Baronet (of Cawthorne); 1963–1972	Extinct
