= Terry Rooney (politician) =

British politician

Chair of the Work and Pensions Select Committee
- In office 18 July 2005 – 6 May 2010
- Preceded by: The Lord Kirkwood of Kirkhope
- Succeeded by: Anne Begg

Member of Parliament for Bradford North
- In office 8 November 1990 – 12 April 2010
- Preceded by: Pat Wall
- Succeeded by: David Ward (Bradford East)

Member of Bradford Council for University
- In office 5 May 1983 – 2 May 1991
- Preceded by: Gary Armitage
- Succeeded by: A. Ahmed

Personal details
- Born: Terence Henry Rooney; 11 November 1950 (age 75) Bradford, West Riding of Yorkshire, England
- Party: Labour
- Spouse: Susanne Rooney
- Children: 3
- Education: Bradford College; Buttershaw Comprehensive School
- Occupation: Welfare Rights Adviser

Terence Henry Rooney (born 11 November 1950) is a British Labour Party politician who served as the Member of Parliament (MP) for Bradford North from 1990 to 2010.

He chaired the Work and Pensions Select Committee from 2005 to 2010, and was the first member of the Church of Jesus Christ of Latter-day Saints elected to the UK Parliament. Rooney's constituency was replaced by Bradford East in boundary changes for the 2010 general election, and he was defeated in the new seat by the Liberal Democrat candidate David Ward.

== Early life and career ==
Rooney was born in Bradford in 1950, attending Buttershaw Comprehensive School and Bradford College, and receiving a Diploma in Higher Education at the latter.

Prior to his election as the MP for Bradford North in a by-election in November 1990, he was a welfare rights adviser at the Bierley Community Centre and a member of Bradford City Council for the University ward. He served as a councillor from 1983 to 1991, a high-profile figure known for his opposition to Militant, chairing the Labour Group from 1988 to 1991, and becoming Deputy Leader of the council from 1990 to 1991.

In 2013, Rooney was criticised for saying that the 1996 IRA bombing in Manchester was "the best thing to happen to the city".

== Member of Parliament ==
In Parliament, Rooney was elected as Chair of the Work and Pensions Select Committee from 2005 to 2010. Other posts he held included:

- Secretary of the Yorkshire Group of Labour MPs (1991–2001).
- Chair of the Parliamentary Labour Party Work and Pensions Committee (1990–2006).
- Member of the Broadcasting Committee (1991–1997).
- Parliamentary Private Secretary to the Minister for the Environment, Michael Meacher (1997–2001).
- Parliamentary Private Secretary to the Minister for Housing and Planning, Keith Hill (2003–05).
- Member of the Joint Committee on House of Lords Reform (2003–05).
- Member of the Liaison Committee (2005–10).

=== Political interests ===
Rooney's main political interests are the welfare state, public sector housing, poverty and industrial relations. He is an active trade unionist and a member of UNISON and formerly Amicus, for which he was the chair of the Amicus Parliamentary Group. Rooney is a firm supporter of the retention of first-past-the-post for Westminster elections, and has also supported more directly redistributive tax and spend policies.

== Personal life ==
Rooney is married to Susanne, a former Bradford councillor, with whom he has three children and nine grandchildren.

He is an active member of the Church of Jesus Christ of Latter-day Saints, and became the first, and only, member of the church elected to the UK Parliament during his tenure.

Parliament of the United Kingdom
Preceded by Pat Wall	Member of Parliament for Bradford North; 1990 – 2010	Constituency abolished see Bradford East
