= Norman Angell =

British politician and Nobel Laureate

Sir Ralph Angell
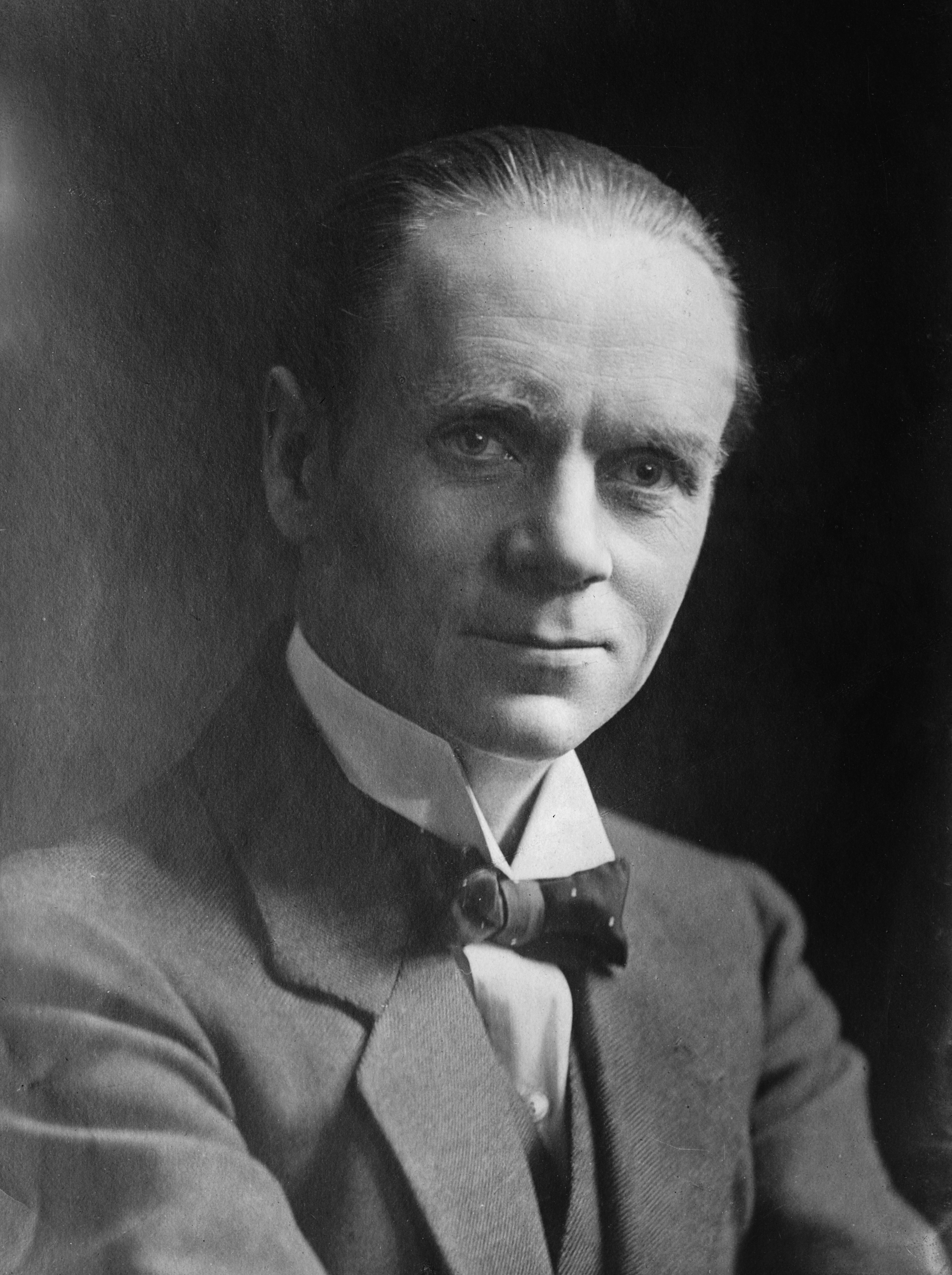

Member of Parliament for Bradford North
- In office 30 May 1929 – 7 October 1931
- Preceded by: Eugene Ramsden
- Succeeded by: Eugene Ramsden

Personal details
- Born: Ralph Norman Angell Lane; 26 December 1872 Holbeach, Lincolnshire, England
- Died: 7 October 1967 (aged 94) Croydon, Surrey, England
- Occupation: lecturer, journalist, author, politician
- Known for: Nobel Peace Prize (1933)

Sir Ralph Norman Angell (26 December 1872 – 7 October 1967) was a lecturer, journalist, author and Member of Parliament for the Labour Party. He was awarded the Nobel Peace Prize for his efforts to promote peace, particularly through writings that argued that modern economic interdependence made war irrational and self-defeating.

Angell was one of the principal founders of the Union of Democratic Control. He served on the Council of the Royal Institute of International Affairs, was an executive for the World Committee against War and Fascism, a member of the executive committee of the League of Nations Union, and the president of the Abyssinia Association. He was knighted in 1931 and awarded the Nobel Peace Prize in 1933.

Angell is most remembered for his 1910 book The Great Illusion, the thesis of which is that the economic integration of the European countries had grown to such a degree that war between them would be entirely futile, making militarism obsolete. Angell was frequently misunderstood at the time, and afterward, as claiming that a general European war was impossible. Because of this widespread misunderstanding, the advent of World War I exposed Angell to scholarly and popular derision.

== Life and career ==
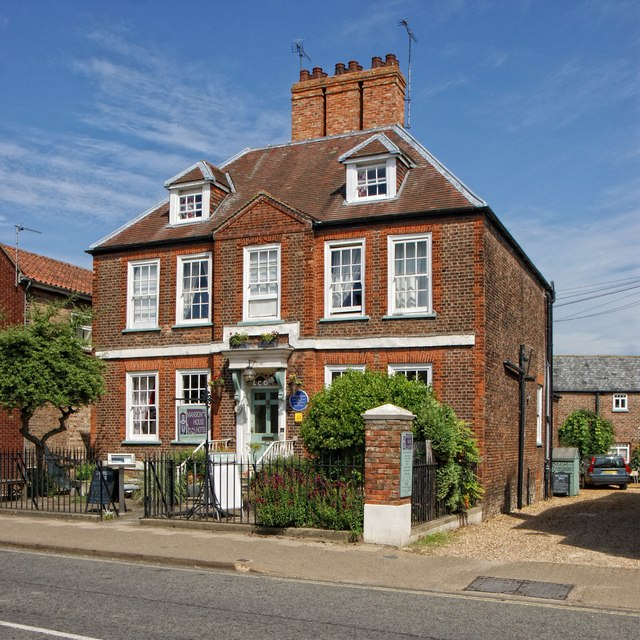
Angell's birthplace on High Street, Holbeach, marked by a blue plaque

Angell was the sixth child born to Thomas Angell Lane and Mary (née Brittain) Lane in Holbeach, Lincolnshire, England. He was born Ralph Norman Angell Lane, but later adopted Angell as his sole surname. He attended several schools in England, the Lycée Alexandre Ribot at Saint-Omer in France, and the University of Geneva, while editing an English-language newspaper published in Geneva.

In Geneva, Angell felt that Europe was "hopelessly entangled in insoluble problems". Then, still only 17, he emigrated to the West Coast of the United States, where for several years he worked as a vine planter, an irrigation-ditch digger, a cowboy, a California homesteader (after filing for American citizenship), a mail carrier, a prospector, and then, closer to his natural skills, as a reporter for the St. Louis Globe-Democrat and later the San Francisco Chronicle.

Due to family matters he returned to England briefly in 1898, then moved to Paris to work as a sub-editor of the English-language Daily Messenger and then as a staff contributor to the newspaper Éclair. Also during this period he acted as French correspondent for some American newspapers, to which he sent dispatches on the progress of the Dreyfus affair. During 1905–12, he became the Paris editor for the Daily Mail.

He returned to England and, in 1914, co-founded the Union of Democratic Control. He joined the Labour Party in 1920 and was parliamentary candidate for Rushcliffe in the general election of 1922 and for Rossendale in 1923. He was MP for Bradford North from 1929 to 1931; after the formation of the National Government, he announced his decision not to seek reelection on 24 September 1931. In the 1931 New Year Honours he was made a Knight Bachelor for public and political services, and in 1933 he received the Nobel Peace Prize. He stood unsuccessfully for the London University seat in 1935.

From the mid-1930s, Angell actively campaigned for collective international opposition to the aggressive policies of Germany, Italy, and Japan. He went to the United States in 1940 to lecture in favour of American support for Britain in World War II, and remained there until after the publication of his autobiography in 1951. He later returned to Britain and died at the age of 94 in Croydon, Surrey.

He married Beatrice Cuvellier in 1899, but they separated and he lived his last 55 years alone. He purchased Northey Island, Essex, which is attached to the mainland only at low tide, and lived in the island's sole dwelling.

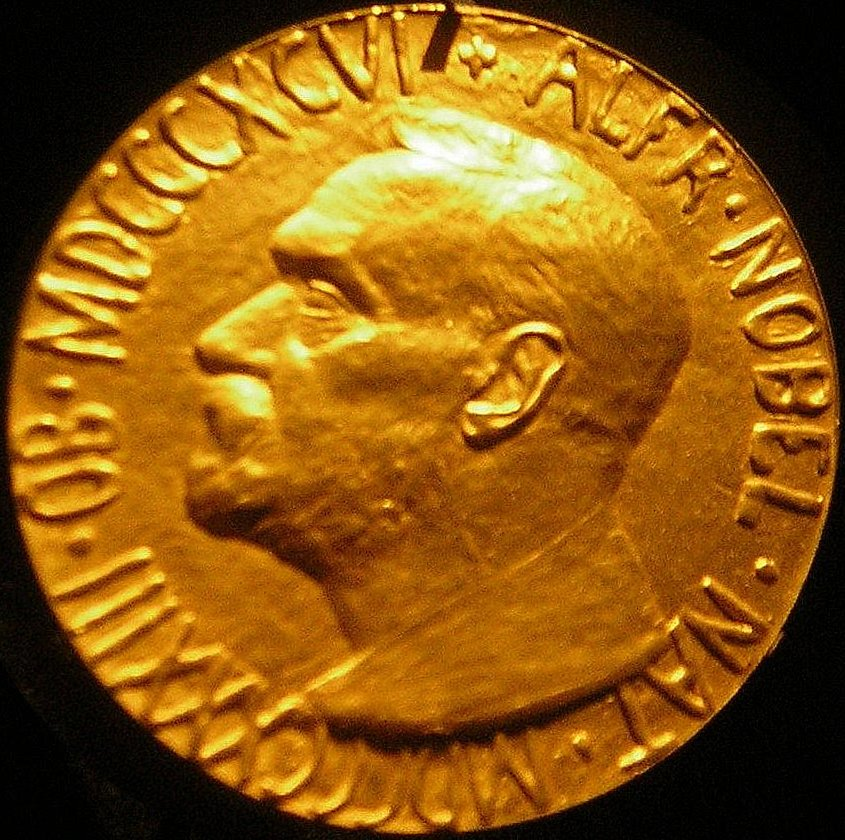
1933 Nobel Peace Prize medal awarded to Angell

Angell's Nobel Prize medal was sold at auction at Sotheby's, London, in 1983 for £8,000 (equivalent to £27,200 in 2025), being bought by his nephew, Eric Angell Lane. The medal, with its accompanying scroll, is now in the collection of the Imperial War Museum.

== The Great Illusion ==
Angell is most remembered for his 1909 pamphlet Europe's Optical Illusion, which was published the next year (and many years thereafter) as the book The Great Illusion. (The anti-war film La Grande Illusion took its title from his pamphlet.) The book's thesis is that the economic integration of the European countries had grown to such a degree that war between them would be entirely futile, making militarism obsolete. This quotation from the "Synopsis" to the popular 1913 edition summarizes his basic argument.

He establishes this apparent paradox, in so far as the economic problem is concerned, by showing that wealth in the economically civilized world is founded upon credit and commercial contract (these being the outgrowth of an economic interdependence due to the increasing division of labour and greatly developed communication). If credit and commercial contract are tampered with in an attempt at confiscation, the credit-dependent wealth is undermined, and its collapse involves that of the conqueror; so that if conquest is not to be self-injurious it must respect the enemy’s property, in which case it becomes economically futile. Thus the wealth of conquered territory remains in the hands of the population of such territory. When Germany annexed Alsace, no individual German secured a single mark’s worth of Alsatian property as the spoils of war. Conquest in the modern world is a process of multiplying by x, and then obtaining the original figure by dividing by x. For a modern nation to add to its territory no more adds to the wealth of the people of such nation than it would add to the wealth of Londoners if the City of London were to annex the county of Hertford.

During World War I, British historian and polemicist G. G. Coulton authored a purported refutation of Angell's pamphlet.

== The Money Game ==
Angell was also the designer of The Money Game, a visual method of teaching schoolchildren the fundamentals of finance and banking. First published in 1928 by J. M. Dent & Sons, The Money Game, How to Play It: A New Instrument of Economic Education was both a book and a game. The bulk of the book was an essay on money and a discussion of economic theory. It also contained a summary of the game's story and an explanation of the rules.

== Influence ==
Angell's book The Press and the Organisation of Society is cited as a source in F. R. Leavis' pamphlet Mass Civilisation and Minority Culture (1930). Vera Brittain quoted Angell's statement on "the moral obligation to be intelligent" several times in her work.

== Works ==
- (As Ralph Lane) Patriotism under Three Flags: A Plea for Rationalism in Politics (1903)
- Europe's Optical Illusion (First ed.), London, UK: Simpkin, Marshall, Hamilton, Kent & Co., 1909
- The Great Illusion: A Study of the Relation of Military Power in Nations to their Economic and Social Advantage (First ed.), New York: G.P. Putnam's & Sons, 1910
- The Great Illusion: A study of the relation of military power to national advantage (1913)
- War and the Workers (1913)
- Peace Theories and the Balkan War (First ed.), London, UK: Horace Marshall & Son, 1912
- Open Letter from Norman Angell (1913)
- The Foundations of International Polity (First ed.), London, UK: William Heinemann, 1914, p. 235
- America and the New World-State. A Plea for American Leadership in International Organization (First ed.), New York & London, UK: G.P. Putnam's & Sons, 1915
- Prussianism And Its Destruction (1914)
- Arms And Industry A Study Of The Foundations Of International Polity (1914)
- The Problems of the War – & the Peace: A Handbook for Students (First ed.), London, UK: William Heinemann, 1915, p. 99
- America And The European War (1915)
- America and the New World-state. A Plea for American Leadership in International Organization (1915)
- The World's Highway (1916)
- The Dangers of Half Preparedness. A Plea for a Declaration of American Policy (1916, in U.S.)
- War Aims: The Need for a Parliament of the Allies (1917)
- Why Freedom Matters (1917)
- The Political Conditions of Allied Success. A plea for the Protective Union of the Democracies (1918, in U.S.)
- The Treaties and the Economic Chaos (1919)
- The British Revolution and the American Democracy (1919)
- The Peace Treaty and the Economic Chaos of Europe (1920). The Swathmore Press.
- The Fruits of Victory: A Sequel to "The Great Illusion" (First ed.), London, UK: W. Collins Sons & Co., 1921, p. 338
- The Press and the Organization of Society (1922)
- If Britain is to Live (1923)
- Foreign Policy and Human Nature (1925)
- Must Britain Travel the Moscow Road? (1926)
- The Public Mind: Its Disorders: Its Exploitation (1927)
- The Money Game: Card Games Illustrating Currency (1928)
- The Story of Money (First ed.), Garden City, NY: Garden City Pub. Co., 1929
- Can Governments Cure Unemployment? (1931, with Harold Wright)
- From Chaos to Control (1932)
- The Unseen Assassins (1932)
- The Great Illusion—1933 (1933)
- The Press And The Organisation Of Society (1933)
- The Intelligent Man’s Way To Prevent War (1934)
- The Menace to Our National Defence (1934)
- Preface to Peace: A Guide for the Plain Man (1935)
- The Mystery of Money: An Explanation for Beginners (1936)
- This Have and Have Not Business: Political Fantasy and Economic Fact (1936)
- Raw Materials, Population Pressure and War (1936, in U.S.)
- The Defence of the Empire (1937)
- Peace with the Dictators? A symposium and some conclusions (1938)
- Must it be War? (1938)
- The Great Illusion—Now (1939)
- For What do We Fight? (1939)
- You and the Refugee (1939)
- Why Freedom Matters (1940)
- America's Dilemma (1941, in U.S.)
- Let the People Know (1943, in U.S.)
- America and the New World (1945)
- The Steep Places (1947)
- After All: The Autobiography of Norman Angell (London: Hamish Hamilton, 1951; rpt. New York: Farrar, Straus and Young, 1952). [Out of print.]

== See also ==
- History of money

Parliament of the United Kingdom
Preceded by Eugene Ramsden	Member of Parliament for Bradford North; 1929–1931	Succeeded by Eugene Ramsden
