= Adam Clapham =

British television director (1940–2022)

Adam Clapham (8 April 1940 – 14 October 2022) was a British television director and producer. He worked at BBC Television for nearly twenty years as a director, becoming the senior executive producer in its documentaries department. He produced a number of television programmes and films, including Doomsday Gun (1994) starring Frank Langella and Alan Arkin.

Clapham was born on 8 April 1940 to Sir Michael Clapham and Elisabeth Rea. His father was an industrialist who served as president of the Confederation of British Industry. For his research in Sri Lanka, Clapham was awarded an Imperial Relations Trust bursary to study media in India and a Leverhulme scholarship for research in Sri Lanka. He wrote As Nature Intended (with Robin Constable), an illustrated history of the nudists, and Beware Falling Coconuts.

Clapham, an indophile along the lines of Mark Tully, lived in a beach house near Mangalore, India. He died on 14 October 2022, at the age of 82.
