= David Ward (British politician) =

British Independent politician

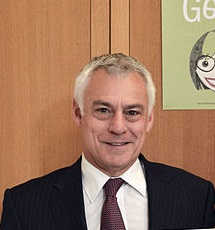

Member of Bradford Council for Bolton and Undercliffe
- In office 2 May 2024 – 7 May 2026
- Preceded by: Simon Cunningham
- Succeeded by: Md Zafar Niaz
- In office 5 May 2016 – 6 May 2021
- Preceded by: Tracey Leeming
- Succeeded by: Simon Cunningham

Member of Parliament for Bradford East
- In office 6 May 2010 – 30 March 2015
- Preceded by: Terry Rooney (Bradford North)
- Succeeded by: Imran Hussain

Member of Bradford Council for Idle and Thackley Idle (1984–2004)
- In office 3 May 1984 – 6 May 2010
- Preceded by: Alan Bagshaw
- Succeeded by: Chris Reid

Personal details
- Born: 24 June 1953 (age 73) Lincoln, Lincolnshire, England
- Party: Independent (since 2017)
- Other political affiliations: Liberal Democrats (1988–2017); Liberal (until 1988)

David Ward (born 24 June 1953) is a British politician who was elected as the Liberal Democrat Member of Parliament (MP) for Bradford East at the 2010 general election. He lost his seat in 2015 when the Labour Party candidate Imran Hussain defeated him by 7,000 votes. Before his election to parliament, he was a councillor in Bradford for 26 years, and returned to local politics as a councillor from 2016 until his defeat in 2021 and returned again in 2024.

In July 2013, he was suspended from the Liberal Democrats Parliamentary party until September 2013, after questioning the continuing existence of the state of Israel and refusing to apologise for his remarks. He was expelled from the party in 2017.

== Early life and career ==
=== Early life: lecturer and Bradford City F.C. ===
David Ward was born in Lincoln; his father was a plumber, and his mother worked on farms, in a canning factory and then in a care home. He attended Boston Grammar School in Boston, Lincolnshire, and then qualified as a member of the Chartered Institute of Public Finance and Accountancy (CIPFA) in 1976. He attended the University of Bradford Management Centre to complete an MBA and an MPhil by research.

He began working at Leeds Polytechnic (later Leeds Metropolitan University) in 1985, remaining there for the next 18 years as a Principal Lecturer in finance and strategic management, and as a Business Development Manager in charge of External Income Generation. In 1996, he obtained an MSc from the University of Leicester.

In July 2004, he was seconded from Leeds Metropolitan University to work at Bradford City Football Club on a full-time basis to help the club to build links with the local community and to engage with the predominantly Pakistani-Bangladeshi community that surrounds the club in Manningham. It is now host to a positive lifestyle centre, which has run programmes for more than 11,000 school children in the past seven years. There is also the football club in the community scheme, which works with 130 of Bradford's schools. On 5 May 2012, the bantamspast museum of Bradford City football club was closed down. Work began to turn the museum into a free school to be run by the One in a Million charity, but a week before the start of the school term in September the funding was pulled for the school. Ward called the move to pull the funding for the school as being "callous, cruel and quite stupid...and incredibly unfair on the parents and children and One in a Million."

=== Bradford public career ===
Ward was first elected to Bradford Metropolitan District Councillor in 1984, and served for 26 years until he was elected to Parliament in 2010. His specialist area was education; he was a governor for 30 years at several special, primary and secondary schools and held the Education Portfolio on the council for four years. Whilst holding this post he visited Kashmir with a Primary school and Secondary school headteacher to try to forge links with local schools.

In 2006, he worked with others to organise the first-ever community day for the Manningham area, and his work at the club was acknowledged later that year when Leeds Metropolitan University won the Times Higher Education Supplement Award for "Outstanding contribution to the local community".

The charity set up by Ward focused mainly on anti-racist interventions and community cohesion events, and he continues to support organisations such as the Sports Campaign Against Racism (SCAR).

He was the Liberal Democrat candidate at the Bradford North by-election in 1990, and after his defeat he stood again in Bradford North at the general elections in 1992, 2001 and 2005.

In 2005, he came second, 3,500 votes behind the incumbent Labour Party MP Terry Rooney. Bradford North was abolished in boundary changes for the general election in May 2010; Ward was elected for the new Bradford East seat, with a majority of 365 votes over Rooney.

== Parliamentary career ==
He was a member of the Business, Innovation and Skills Select Committee from June 2010 to June 2012, when he became a member of the Education Select Committee.

=== Controversies ===
==== Comments on the Holocaust ====
On 25 January 2013, the Liberal Democrats reprimanded Ward for his "use of language" in a statement on his website about Israel's treatment of Palestinians, which he put on his blog the same day that he signed a memorial book in the House of Commons marking Holocaust Memorial Day. He wrote there that he honoured "those who were persecuted and killed during the Holocaust" but also commented: "Having visited Auschwitz twice – once with my family and once with local schools – I am saddened that the Jews, who suffered unbelievable levels of persecution during the Holocaust, could within a few years of liberation from the death camps be inflicting atrocities on Palestinians in the new State of Israel and continue to do so on a daily basis in the West Bank and Gaza". "It appears that the suffering by the Jews has not transformed their views on how others should be treated", he said in a later statement.

Karen Pollock, chief executive of the Holocaust Educational Trust, said: "Mr Ward has deliberately abused the memory of the Holocaust, causing deep pain and offence – these comments are sickening and unacceptable and have no place in British politics". Jon Benjamin, chief executive of the Board of Deputies of British Jews, said: "We are outraged and shocked at these offensive comments about Jewish victims of the Holocaust and the suggestion that Jews should have learned a lesson from the experience."

In an updated blog entry on 26 January he stated he had "never for a moment intended to criticise or offend the Jewish people as a whole, either as a race or as a people of faith, and apologise sincerely for the unintended offence which my words caused" and stated that while his "criticisms of actions since 1948 in the Palestinian territories in the name of the State of Israel remain as strong as ever" he was "trying to make clear that everybody needs to learn the lessons of the Holocaust".

In a meeting with Alistair Carmichael, the Liberal Democrats chief whip, Ward was told he would face disciplinary action if he repeated these words. A meeting Ward was to attend with the Liberal Democrat Friends of Israel in February 2013 over his use of language did not occur because he had not removed contentious phrasing from his website.

In an interview with Aida Edemariam of The Guardian in February 2013, Ward said: "There is a huge operation out there, a machine almost, which is designed to protect the state of Israel from criticism. And that comes into play very, very quickly" with the result "I end up looking at" the vocabulary "I should use" which "is winning, for them. Because what I want to talk about is the fundamental question of how can they do this, and how can they be allowed to do this".

==== Comments on Israel ====
Ward tweeted on 13 July 2013: "Am I wrong or are am I right? At long last the Zionists are losing the battle – how long can the apartheid State of Israel last?" He refused to apologise for questioning Israel's right to exist, and was suspended from the Liberal Democrats parliamentary party for three months.

The Liberal Democrats' chief whip Alistair Carmichael reminded him of his failure to keep a previous promise to use "proportionate and precise" language when commenting on Israel, writing: "These interventions cause considerable offence rather than addressing questions of political substance about the plight of the Palestinian people and the right of Israel's citizens to live a life free of violence". Jonathan Arkush, vice-president of the Board of Deputies of British Jews, described the decision to take away Ward's party whip as "too little, too late" and "an empty gesture" because of the parliamentary recess. Parliament was due to sit for only two weeks in September 2013 before the end of his suspension. Ward objected to his suspension believing his views are widely shared. The Respect MP for Bradford West, George Galloway, defended Ward against his suspension, as did several Muslim activists in his constituency. Within the Liberal Democrats, he was defended by former-MP Michael Meadowcroft, who described his treatment by the party as "shameful".

==== Comments on the Board of Deputies ====
In November 2013, after Ward had said that it is "a shame there isn’t a powerful, well-funded Board of Deputies for Roma", an editorial in The Jewish Chronicle described his comments as "a clear restatement of the most basic antisemitic theme of all — that wealthy Jews buy up power" and said that the Liberal Democrats' had given a "contemptible response" with their inaction.

==== Comments on Hamas rockets ====
Ward tweeted in July 2014 about the ongoing Israeli conflict in Gaza suggesting that if he lived in Gaza, he would fire rockets at Israel: "The big question is – if I lived in #Gaza would I fire a rocket? – probably yes". Interviewed on BBC Radio 5 Live, he initially refused to apologise.

Ward was condemned by other politicians. Grant Shapps, the Chairman of the Conservative Party, called the tweet "essentially [an] incitement to violence" and "completely irresponsible". Shapps urged him to delete the comment. A Liberal Democrat spokesperson called the tweet "vile and crass"; the party leader Nick Clegg had called for peace in Israel and Gaza. Gavin Stollar, chair of the Liberal Democrats Friends of Israel, said Ward was "an ignorant political opportunist" who "is neither a Liberal nor a Democrat".

An apology was issued under his name by his party in late July. "I utterly condemn the violence on both sides in Israel and Gaza" he said, and "while I defend the right of Israel to exist and defend itself, I will continue to speak out for the rights of the Palestinian people". In a response, the Board of Deputies said: "This morning's 'spin' in no way negates the fact that David Ward has deliberately placed himself outside the party’s core beliefs and values. We have seen Ward apologise and receive rebuke before, to no avail".

The following month, it emerged Ward would not face any disciplinary action. The party's chief whip, by now Don Foster, said the comment had not brought the party into disrepute, nor was it antisemitic. Ward had assured Foster "he would do all he could to ensure comments he made would be in a form that would be difficult to misinterpret".

==== Comments following Charlie Hebdo attack ====
During the republican marches in January 2015, following the Charlie Hebdo shooting and Porte de Vincennes hostage crisis during which four French Jews were murdered at a kosher supermarket, he tweeted "Je suis #Palestinian" (a play on the Je suis Charlie slogan) and that Israeli Prime Minister Benjamin Netanyahu's presence in Paris "makes [him] feel sick". The tweet was criticised by the Israeli ambassador. A Liberal Democrat spokesman said "David Ward does not speak for the Liberal Democrats on this issue. He has well known and strongly held views on this issue but this tweet was clearly in bad taste". The comments were also condemned by party leader Nick Clegg. Not long afterwards at an event, Maajid Nawaz, a former Islamist and former Liberal Democrat candidate, said the Paris victims had been "murdered for being Jewish and no other reason" and asked his audience to acknowledge, if such a situation was reversed for Muslims in someone's tweet, "how hurtful such a sentiment at such a time can be".

== Post-Parliament ==
Ward lost his Bradford East seat at the 2015 general election to Labour's Imran Hussain who gained the seat with a majority of 7,084. Ward returned to local politics as a member of Bradford's Metropolitan District Council in the May 2016 elections, and was reported to be studying at the time for a Middle East Politics and Security Studies MA at Bradford University.

The Liberal Democrats reminded Ward of "its opposition to antisemitism" in May 2016 after he tweeted his support for Naz Shah, the MP for Bradford West whom Labour suspended after she was revealed to have shared a Norman Finkelstein tweet showing a map with Israel re-located to the United States.

Tim Farron, leader of the Liberal Democrats, told a hearing of the Commons Home Affairs Committee's inquiry into antisemitism in October 2016 when asked about Ward's 2013 suspension that after "a disciplinary process has been gone through" and "they have served their time, then it’s appropriate" for the individual to return to active involvement in a "free organisation as they would do otherwise". Farron said he didn't agree with Ward's comments "some of which I would deem to be anti-semitic".

Ward was selected to contest his former seat of Bradford East at the 2017 general election for the Liberal Democrats. Polling suggested he might defeat the Labour incumbent. Shortly afterwards, Theresa May mentioned his "questionable record on antisemitism" on 26 April in the last prime minister's questions before the election. Ward was removed as the party's candidate and suspended from party membership before an intended independent investigation. Tim Farron said "Ward is unfit to represent the party" and the Liberal Democrats have "zero tolerance" for "anti-Semitic remarks". Ward told BBC News: "I would defy anybody to find one single derogatory comment I've made against a Jew which was not related to something being done in Israel". Ward stood as an independent, but Hussain was returned as the constituency MP with a larger majority; Ward came a distant third, but ahead of the Liberal Democrat candidate.

In May 2016 Ward successfully stood in the electoral ward of Bolton and Undercliffe to become a Liberal Democrat councillor for Bradford Council. However, after being expelled from the party, he sat as an independent. Standing for re-election as an independent at the 2021 local elections, Ward lost his seat to Labour despite the Liberal Democrats not fielding a candidate.

Parliament of the United Kingdom
New constituency	Member of Parliament for Bradford East; 2010–2015	Succeeded by Imran Hussain
