= The Great Illusion =

Book by Norman Angell

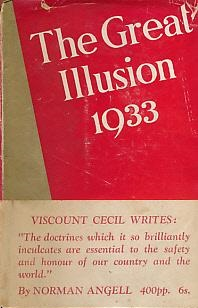
- New 1933 edition
- Authors: Norman Angell
- Original title: Europe's Optical Illusion
- Language: English
- Publication date: 1909; 1933

The Great Illusion is a book by Norman Angell, first published in the United Kingdom in 1909 under the title Europe's Optical Illusion and republished in 1910 and subsequently in various enlarged and revised editions under the title The Great Illusion. It is an influential book in the field of international relations.

== Content ==
In The Great Illusion, Angell's primary thesis was, in the words of historian James Joll, that "the economic cost of war was so great that no one could possibly hope to gain by starting a war the consequences of which would be so disastrous." For that reason, a general European war was very unlikely to start, and if it did, it would not last long. He argued that war was economically and socially irrational and that war between industrial countries was futile because conquest did not pay. J. D. B. Miller writes: "The 'Great Illusion' was that nations gained by armed confrontation, militarism, war, or conquest."

According to Angell, the economic interdependence between industrial countries would be "the real guarantor of the good behavior of one state to another", as it meant that war would be economically harmful to all the countries involved. Moreover, if a conquering power confiscated property in the territory it seized, "the incentive [of the local population] to produce would be sapped and the conquered area be rendered worthless. Thus, the conquering power had to leave property in the hands of the local population while incurring the costs of conquest and occupation."

Further, the nature of modern capitalism was such that nationalist sentiment did not motivate capitalists, because "the capitalist has no country, and he knows, if he be of the modern type, that arms and conquests and jugglery with frontiers serve no ends of his, and may very well defeat them."

Angell said that arms build-ups, for example the naval race between the UK and Germany that was happening, as he wrote the book in the 1900s, was not going to secure peace. Instead, it would lead to increased insecurity and thus ratchet up the likelihood of war. The only viable route to peace would be respect for international law, implemented in a world court, in which issues would be dealt with rationally and peacefully.

== Critical reception ==
The Great Illusion was a best-selling popular success and was quickly translated into eleven languages, becoming something of a "cult", spawning study groups at British universities "devoted to propagating its dogma." The book was taken up by Viscount Esher, a courtier who was charged with remodeling the British Army after the Boer War. Also enamored of the book was Admiral John Fisher, the First Sea Lord, who called it "heavenly manna". Historian Niall Ferguson uses the receptiveness to the book of these paragons of the British military and naval establishments as evidence that it was not the pacifist work it superficially seemed to be, but instead a "Liberal imperialist tract directed at German opinion", with the aim of discouraging Germany from continuing its bid to become a great naval power, a program which had begun the fierce, and expensive, naval arms race between the United Kingdom and Germany. The fact that Angell was employed, as editor of the Continental Daily Mail by Lord Northcliffe, a press baron whom Ferguson refers to as an "arch-scaremonger", is to Ferguson further evidence of a deeper, non-pacifist purpose to the book.

The eruption of World War I mere years after the book's publication (coupled with another statement by Angell, made mere months before the war began, that any war that did occur would be far less ferocious than those in the past) led the book to be ignored for many years and, to the extent that it attracted attention, caused Angell to be criticized as an idealist, especially by advocates of realism. Later scholars, however, would view it as a key work in the development of Liberal internationalism and the modern understanding of international relations.

== Interwar edition ==
A new edition of The Great Illusion was published in 1933; it added "the theme of collective defence." Angell was awarded the Nobel Peace Prize in 1933.

== In popular culture ==
- The Great Illusion is mentioned in the 1929 novel Death of a Hero by Richard Aldington. It was used as evidence by the main character that the coming world war would not happen.
- One of the characters in the D. K. Broster story "The Window" (1929), set in pre-World War I France, mentions having read Angell's book, and uses it to argue that "it is impossible that there should be a great war nowadays".
- The book is the subject of a discussion in the officers' mess between the lead characters in the Andre Maurois novel of World War I, The Silence Of Colonel Bramble.
- The book lent its name to Jean Renoir's 1937 anti-war film La Grande Illusion.
- Though not specifically naming where the idea comes from, Mr Birling in An Inspector Calls written in 1945 but set in 1912, sets out his belief war will be impossible for similar reasons along with other incorrect prophesies like the Titanic being absolutely unsinkable.

== See also ==
- Jan Gotlib Bloch, Is War Now Impossible? (Paris, 1898)
