= Southside House =

Historical home in England

Coordinates: 51.420939°N 0.226920°W

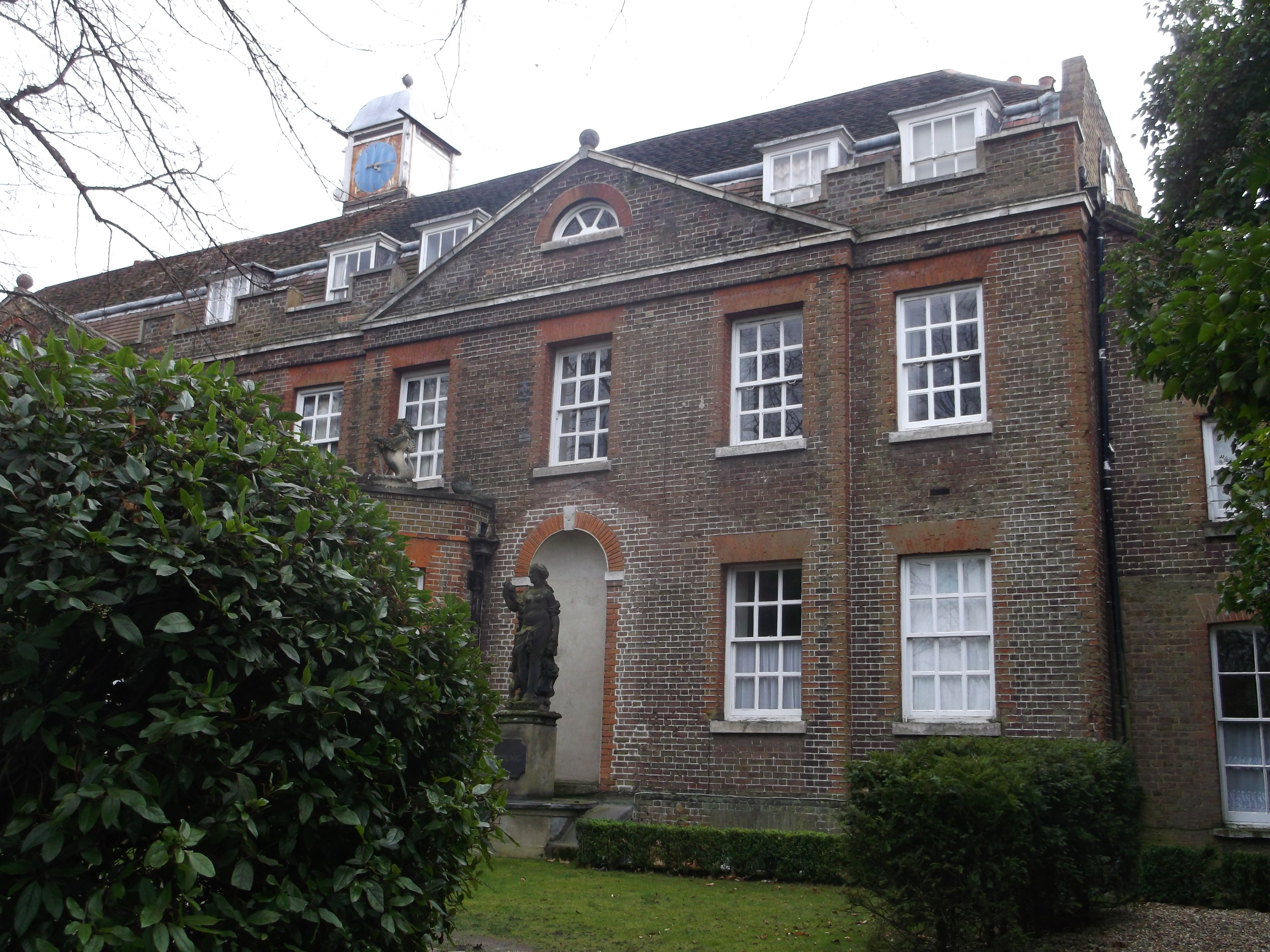
Southside House

Southside House is a historical 15,650 sq ft (1,454 m^{2}) home located on the south side of Wimbledon Common. It is Grade II* listed.

Dating back to Jacobean times, Southside House was originally a farm at either end of which were built two cottages. These cottages were knocked down, rebuilt and refurbished and, by the mid-1700s, they had become two townhouses joined by a wall. In the Georgian era, the two structures were double towards the South and the facade was united.

In 1931, the house known originally as Southside House was bought by Hilda Pennington Mellor, who populated it with paintings, furniture and chattels brought from Villa Françon, a previous family residence in France. In the following decades, Malcolm Munthe, Hilda's son, would work renovating and restoring both Southside and Carefrae House, the adjacent property, purchased by the family in the early 1950s.

Over time, Southside would be associated with a variety of historical characters and episodes in Major Munthe's brilliant storytelling. As the only historical home in Merton, it fulfils an active role in fostering culture and education in the borough through concerts, literary evenings, school visits and other activities. It is run by the Pennington-Mellor-Munthe Charity Trust together with Hellens Manor, the Trust's country house in Herefordshire.

The house was sold to new owners in May 2022.
