= Stephen Benn, 3rd Viscount Stansgate =

British scientist (born 1951)

The Right Honourable The Viscount Stansgate
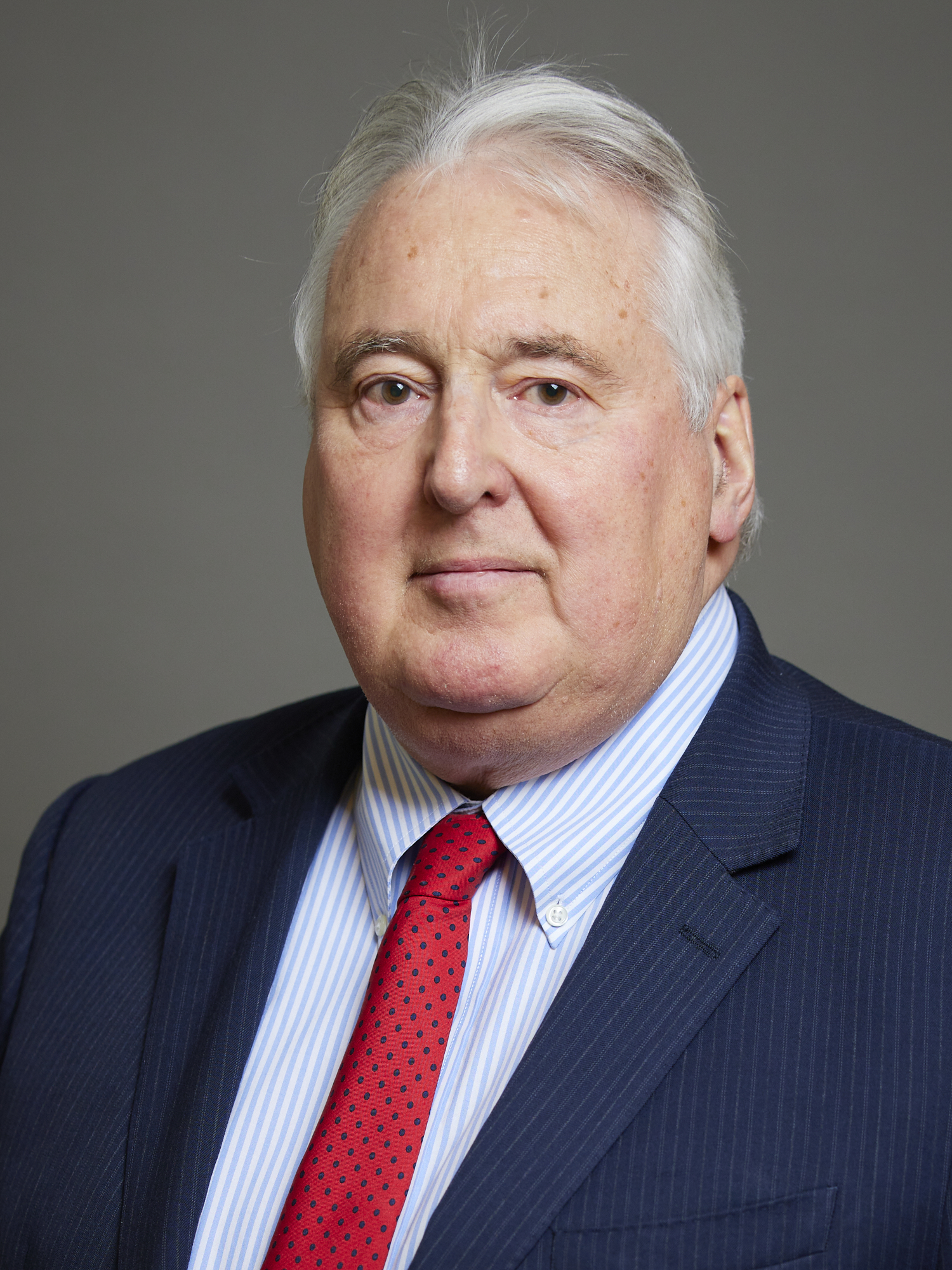
- Official portrait, 2022

Member of the House of Lords
- Lord Temporal
- Life peerage 3 June 2026
- Elected Hereditary Peer; 15 July 2021 – 29 April 2026
- By-election: 2021
- Preceded by: The 3rd Baron Rea
- Succeeded by: Seat abolished

Personal details
- Born: Stephen Michael Wedgwood Benn; 21 August 1951 (age 75)
- Party: Labour
- Spouse: Nita Clarke
- Children: 2, including Emily
- Parents: Tony Benn (father); Caroline DeCamp (mother)
- Relatives: Hilary Benn (brother); Melissa Benn (sister)
- Education: Keele University

Stephen Michael Wedgwood Benn, 3rd Viscount Stansgate, Baron Stansgate of Holland Park (born 21 August 1951), is a British life peer and Labour member of the House of Lords.

In May 2026, it was announced that he was to be given one of 26 new life peerages, keeping him in the House of Lords following the coming into force of the House of Lords (Hereditary Peers) Act 2026.

== Early life and education ==
Stansgate's father, Tony Benn, and his younger brother, Hilary Benn, have both been senior Labour politicians. His mother was Caroline Benn, an educationalist and writer, and his sister is Melissa Benn, a feminist writer.

He was educated at Holland Park School from 1962 to 1968 and at Keele University, where he was awarded a doctorate (PhD) in 1984 for a thesis entitled "The White House Staff".

== Career ==
Stansgate was an elected member of the Inner London Education Authority from 1986 to 1990.

In 2011, he was appointed director of parliamentary affairs for the Royal Society of Biology after spending two decades in a similar role for the Royal Society of Chemistry. He is also a vice-president of the Parliamentary and Scientific Committee.

== House of Lords ==
Benn succeeded to the title Viscount Stansgate on the death of his father in March 2014. His acceptance of the title was recorded on 10 November 2014 with a note in the minutes of Proceedings from the House of Lords, stating:

"The Lord Chancellor reported that Stephen Michael Wedgwood Benn had established his claim to the Viscountcy of Stansgate in the Peerage of the United Kingdom. The Clerk of the Parliaments was accordingly directed to enter Viscount Stansgate on the register of hereditary peers maintained under Standing Order 10(5)."

He stood for election as a Labour hereditary peer in the House of Lords and was elected unopposed on 10 July 2021, replacing Lord Rea who died in 2020. He took the oath on 6 September that year and made his maiden speech on 14 October 2021 in a Regional Strategy debate, with his brother Hilary Benn looking on.

== Personal life ==
Stansgate married Ashika Nita Bowes in 1988. They have two children:

- Hon Emily Benn (born 4 October 1989)
- Hon Daniel Benn (born 10 December 1991), heir apparent to the viscountcy.

Emily, an investment banker by occupation, pursued a political career and sat on the Croydon London Borough Council as a Labour member until she resigned in 2016 on moving to New York. In 2022 she was elected to the City of London Common Council.

== Arms ==
Coat of arms of Viscount Stansgate
Crest On a rock a spear erect proper, flowing therefrom a pennon azure, charged with the word “Onward”, letters or. Escutcheon Argent, two barrulets indented gules, between in chief as many dragons’ heads erased and in base a pencil and a pen in saltire proper, tied with a lace azure, pendent therefrom a torteau, charged with a figure “1914” or. Motto Deo Favente (By God's favour).

== Sources ==
- Father's obituary

Peerage of the United Kingdom
Disclaimed Title last held by Tony Benn	Viscount Stansgate; 2014–present	Incumbent; Heir: Daniel Benn (b. 1991)
Parliament of the United Kingdom
Preceded by The Lord Rea	Elected hereditary peer to the House of Lords under the House of Lords Act 1999; 2021–2026	Position abolished under the House of Lords (Hereditary Peers) Act 2026
