= Walter Rea, 1st Baron Rea =

British merchant banker and Liberal politician

The Right Honourable The Lord Rea

Comptroller of the Household
- In office 12 November 1931 – 30 September 1932
- Monarch: George V
- Prime Minister: Ramsay MacDonald
- Preceded by: Goronwy Owen
- Succeeded by: George Penny

Chief Whip of the Liberal Party
- In office 12 November 1931 – 25 October 1935
- Leader: Herbert Samuel
- Preceded by: Goronwy Owen
- Succeeded by: Percy Harris

Lord Commissioner of the Treasury
- In office 3 February 1915 – 5 December 1916
- Monarch: George V
- Prime Minister: H. H. Asquith
- Preceded by: new appointment
- Succeeded by: John Pratt
Parliamentary offices
Member of the House of Lords Lord Temporal
In office 29 January 1937 – 26 May 1948; Hereditary peerage
Preceded by	Peerage created
Succeeded by	The 2nd Lord Rea
Member of Parliament for Dewsbury
In office 27 October 1931 – 25 October 1935
Preceded by	Benjamin Riley
Succeeded by	Benjamin Riley
Member of Parliament for Bradford North
In office 6 December 1923 – 9 October 1924
Preceded by	Archibald Boyd-Carpenter
Succeeded by	Eugene Ramsden
Member of Parliament for Scarborough
In office 8 February 1906 – 25 November 1918
Preceded by	Joseph Compton-Rickett
Succeeded by	constituency abolished

Personal details
- Born: 18 May 1873
- Died: 26 May 1948 (aged 75)
- Party: Liberal
- Spouse(s): Evelyn Muirhead; Jemima Ewing
- Relations: Philip (Son)
- Parent: Russell Rea (father)
- Education: University College School

Walter Russell Rea, 1st Baron Rea (18 May 1873 – 26 May 1948), was a British merchant banker and Liberal politician.

== Early life and career ==
Rea was the son of Russell Rea, and was educated at University College School in Hampstead and "abroad".

== Political career ==
He was elected to the House of Commons for Scarborough in 1906, a seat he held until 1918, and served under H. H. Asquith as a Junior Lord of the Treasury from 1915 to 1916. In 1918, he stood for election in Oldham, coming fourth behind the Unionist and Coalition Liberal candidates:

He later represented Bradford North between 1923 and 1924 and Dewsbury between 1931 and 1935. From 1931 to 1932 he held office in the National Government of Ramsay MacDonald as Comptroller of the Household. Rea was created a Baronet, of Eskdale in the County of Cumberland, in 1935 and in 1937 he was raised to the peerage as Baron Rea, of Eskdale in the County of Cumberland.

=== Elections contested ===
==== UK Parliament elections ====
Date of election	Constituency	Party	Votes	%	Result
1906	Scarborough	Liberal	3,128	54.4	Elected
1910 (Jan)	Scarborough	Liberal	3,011	52.5	Elected
1910 (Dec)	Scarborough	Liberal	2,763	50.5	Elected
1918	Oldham	Liberal	9,323	12.1*	Not Elected (4th)*
1920	Nelson and Colne	Liberal	5,805	20.4	Not Elected (3rd)
1922	Bradford North	Liberal	9,008	32.0	Not Elected (2nd)
1923	Bradford North	Liberal	9,365	34.0	Elected
1924	Bradford North	Liberal	8,007	27.7	Not Elected (3rd)
1929	Taunton	Liberal	11,121	33.9	Not Elected (2nd)
1931	Dewsbury	Liberal	19,463	63.7	Elected
1935	Dewsbury	Liberal	6,933	23.3	Not Elected (3rd)

== Personal life ==
Lord Rea married, firstly, Evelyn, daughter of J. J. Muirhead, in 1896. After her death in 1930 he married, secondly, Jemima, daughter of Reverend Alexander Ewing, in 1931. He died in May 1948, aged 75, and was succeeded in his titles by his eldest son from his first marriage, Philip, who became Liberal leader in the House of Lords. His daughter Elisabeth, also from his first marriage, was married to the industrialist Sir Michael Clapham. Lady Rea died in 1964.

In later life he was chairman of Rea Brothers, merchant bankers.

Coat of arms of Walter Rea, 1st Baron Rea
Crest A stag at gaze Gules resting the dexter fore-leg on an anchor Or. Escutcheon Or on a fess wavy Azure between three stags courant Gules a lymphad sails furled of the field. Supporters On either side a stag Gules each charged on the shoulder with a bezant thereon an anchor Azure. Motto In Omnia Promptus

Parliament of the United Kingdom
Preceded by Joseph Rickett	Member of Parliament for Scarborough; 1906–1918	Constituency abolished
Preceded by Archibald Boyd-Carpenter	Member of Parliament for Bradford North; 1923–1924	Succeeded by Eugene Ramsden
Preceded by Ben Riley	Member of Parliament for Dewsbury; 1931–1935	Succeeded by Ben Riley
Political offices
Preceded by Goronwy Owen	Comptroller of the Household; 1931–1932	Succeeded by Sir Frederick Penny
Party political offices
Preceded by Goronwy Owen	Liberal Chief Whip; 1931–1935	Succeeded by Percy Harris
Preceded by Percy Heffer	Treasurer of the Liberal Party; 1941–1947; With: Herbert Worsley (1942–1947)	Succeeded by Patrick Moynihan
Peerage of the United Kingdom
New creation	Baron Rea; 1937–1948	Succeeded by Philip Rea
Baronetage of the United Kingdom
New creation	Baronet (of Eskdale); 1935–1948	Succeeded by Philip Rea
