= Doomsday Gun =

1994 television film

- Written by: Walter Bernstein; Lionel Chetwynd
- Directed by: Robert Young
- Starring: Frank Langella; Alan Arkin; Kevin Spacey
- Theme music composer: Richard Harvey
- Countries of origin: United Kingdom; United States
- Original language: English

Production
- Producer: Adam Clapham
- Editor: Tariq Anwar
- Running time: 106 minutes
- Production company: HBO Showcase

Original release
- Network: HBO
- Release: July 23, 1994

Doomsday Gun is a 1994 television film produced by HBO, dramatizing the life of Canadian supergun designer Dr. Gerald Bull and his involvement in Project Babylon, Saddam Hussein's plan to build a supergun with a range of over 500 miles (800 km).

== Synopsis ==
The younger Catholic Gerald Bull is fascinated with large-bore guns, inspired by Jules Verne's novel From The Earth To The Moon. The older Dr. Gerald Bull's career as a successful large-bore gun designer takes a turn as he is defunded by the U.S. Army; he then produces weapons for China, Israel, and ultimately South Africa which results in his arrest and conviction for illegal arms dealing.

After his release, Bull promotes his supergun idea to Iraqi dictator Saddam Hussein, and, with funding through BCCI, begins design work on the top secret project, "Babylon". Bull solves several manufacturing challenges by forging and assembling it in sections which are bolted together by flanges, and lining the relatively soft barrel material with an alloy sleeve to reduce wear on the barrel. British and U.S. government agencies are shown to be aware of Bull's activities, but do nothing to stop him. The Israeli Mossad tries to dissuade Bull, and goes so far as to threaten his life, with no effect.

As the "Baby Babylon" version of the gun is assembled and tested successfully horizontally in Iraq, Bull's second in command, Cowley, quits after a roadside run-in with Mossad agent Dov, who also shadowed Bull. The Iraqis demand an additional, 45-degree, test of the prototype gun, using threats to coerce Bull into compliance. That completed test firing results in a direct hit on a target 100 miles (160 km) away, and Bull brags that the full size "Babylon" gun can fire "ten times as far."

As production of the full-size sections of the gun continues in England and elsewhere, falsely documented as oil pipeline parts in order to evade export restrictions, the film depicts increasing threats to Bull's life from Saddam, and the Mossad agent/handler Col Yossi tells Dov that assassination of Bull will happen one way or another as he has too many enemies and not many friends. A threat to Iran, the Iraqis due to his knowing too much, Syrians, some African nations, and the Saudis. An embarrassment and liability to the UK and there is also the US who consider him a possible liability too. As the gun nears completion, Bull, while returning home, is gunned down at his apartment, where his body is discovered by his wife.

The end text crawl states that Dr. Bull's murder remains unsolved, and that the U.S. contributed over $3 billion to Iraq in the years preceding the Gulf War.

== Cast ==
- Frank Langella as Dr. Gerald Bull
- Alan Arkin as Col. Yossi
- Kevin Spacey as Jim Price
- Michael Kitchen as Chris Cowley
- Francesca Annis as Sophie
- Alexandra Vandernoot as Marie
- Aharon Ipalé as Maurouf
- Zia Mohyeddin as Hashim
- Tony Goldwyn as Donald Duvall
- James Fox as Sir James Whittington
- Rupert Graves as Jones
- Clive Owen as Dov
- Marianne Denicourt as Monique
- Mark Ryan as SAS Man

== Production ==
The film was shot on location in England, Belgium, and Spain, with post production at Twickenham Studios. It premiered Saturday, July 23, 1994 on HBO.

== Reception ==
Reviews were mixed, noting good performances, with several faulting the script and direction. Variety reviewer Ray Loynd described the film as "politically biting", Langella's performance as "absorbing", and "fascinating, buoyant, ebullient", but described the story as appealing to "your brain, not your heart or your gut" and lacking major empathetic characters. TV Guide noted that though the film's direction was "competent without being eye-openingly fresh, it cannot override flaws in the script which make the film a dull experience", and gave the film two out of four stars. Its ratings notice indicates "extreme profanity, violence, tough situations." The New York Times' review found the film's conceit of a "daunting but lovable" protagonist as a weapons designer to be "loopy", contrasting Bull in real-life as "a difficult man, prickly and quick to take offense" with Langella's portrayal as "endlessly charming." The film's writing was criticized for "quips and zingers that aren't worth the effort" and for "thoroughly defusing what might have been a tense drama with genuinely high stakes." The Los Angeles Times review noted no flaws with the film, describing it as an "intricately woven thriller that demands the viewer's undivided attention" and praising Langella's portrayal of Bull.

The film was nominated for a 1995 cable Ace Award for best original soundtrack.
