= Ben Ford (politician) =

British politician (1925–2022)

Ben Ford DL

Member of Parliament for Bradford North
- In office 15 October 1964 – 13 May 1983
- Preceded by: William Taylor
- Succeeded by: Geoffrey Lawler

Member of Essex County Council
- In office 1959–1965

Member of Clacton Urban District Council
- In office 1959–1962

Personal details
- Born: Benjamin Thomas Ford; 1 April 1925 London, England
- Died: 17 April 2022 (aged 97)
- Party: Labour (until 1983); Independent Labour (1983); SDP (1984–88); Liberal Democrats (from 1988)
- Spouse: Vera Fawcett-Fancet (m. 1950)
- Children: 3

Benjamin Thomas Ford DL (1 April 1925 – 17 April 2022) was a British Labour politician, who was the Member of Parliament for Bradford North from 1964 to 1983.

== Early years ==
Born to parents Benjamin Charles Ford and May Ethel (née Moorton), Ford's address at the time of his birth was 67 Haberdasher Street, Shoreditch, County of London. He moved to Streatham, SW16, in 1927. Ford attended Rowan Road Central School in Surrey. From 1951 to 1964, he worked as an electronic fitter-wireman.

== Political career ==
Ford was councillor on Clacton Urban District Council from 1959 to 1962, and an alderman of Essex County Council from 1959 to 1965. Ford was election agent for Harwich in 1959, and president of that Constituency Labour Party from 1955 to 1963.

Ford was elected the Labour Party Member of Parliament for Bradford North at the 1964 general election. Whilst an MP, he served as chairman of the All-Party Wool and Textile Group of MPs, and was a founder member of The Manifesto Group (an alliance of Labour parliamentarians opposed to the party's perceived move to the left). In 1982, he was deselected as the Labour candidate in favour of Pat Wall, and subsequently stood at the 1983 general election as an Independent Labour candidate. Ford polled 9% of the vote, which arguably split Labour support and helped the Conservative candidate, Geoffrey Lawler, to win.

Ford joined the Social Democratic Party (SDP) in late 1984. When that party merged with the Liberal Party to form the Liberal Democrats in 1988, he became chair of the party's constituency association in Leeds North West. In 1991, he was appointed president of the Leeds Federation of Liberal Democrats, remaining in situ for the next six years.

== Honours ==
In 1979, Ford was made a Freeman of the City of London. From 1978 to 1999, he was a Liveryman of the Gunmakers' Company. In 1982, he became a deputy lieutenant of West Yorkshire. He became an Honorary Fellow of the Association of International Accountants in 1983. In 1976, he was made a Grand Officer of the Order of the Southern Cross in Brazil.

== Personal life ==
Ford married Vera Ada (née Fawcett-Fancet) in 1950, with whom he had three children: Anthony, Paula and Ivan. Outside of politics, he listed his recreations as music, shooting, family and reading. He lived in Bramhope, Leeds, and was a member of East Ward Labour Club in Bradford. Ben Ford died on 17 April 2022, at the age of 97.

== Publications ==
- Piecework, 1960

Parliament of the United Kingdom
Preceded by William Taylor	Member of Parliament for Bradford North; 1964–1983	Succeeded by Geoffrey Lawler
