= Nicolas Rea, 3rd Baron Rea =

British hereditary peer, doctor, and politician (1928–2020)

The Right Honourable The Lord Rea
- Rea's last parliamentary speech, 2020

Member of the House of Lords
- Lord Temporal
- Hereditary peerage 21 April 1982 – 11 November 1999
- Preceded by: The 2nd Baron Rea
- Succeeded by: Seat abolished
- Elected Hereditary Peer; 11 November 1999 – 1 June 2020
- Election: 1999
- Preceded by: Seat established
- Succeeded by: The 3rd Viscount Stansgate

Personal details
- Born: John Nicolas Rea; 6 June 1928
- Died: 1 June 2020 (aged 91)
- Party: Labour
- Spouses: Elizabeth Robinson (m. 1951; div. 1991); Judith Mary Powell (m. 1991)
- Children: 6
- Parent(s): James Russell Rea; Betty Marion Bevan
- Education: MA (Cantab), MB BChir, MD, DObst RCOG,
- Alma mater: Dartington Hall School; Belmont Hill School; Dauntsey's School; Christ's College, Cambridge; University College Hospital
- Occupation: Doctor
- Learned societies: Fellow of the Royal College of General Practitioners; Member of the Royal Society of Medicine

Military service
- Allegiance: United Kingdom
- Branch/service: British Army
- Rank: Acting Sergeant
- Unit: Suffolk Regiment

John Nicolas Rea, 3rd Baron Rea (6 June 1928 – 1 June 2020), commonly known as Nicolas Rea, was a British hereditary peer, doctor and politician.

== Early life ==
Rea was born in 1928 to James Russell Rea and Betty Rea (née Bevan), and attended Dartington Hall School in Devon, Belmont Hill School in Massachusetts and Dauntsey's School in Wiltshire. He was further educated at Christ's College, Cambridge, where he graduated with a Master of Arts in natural sciences, a Bachelor of Medicine, a Bachelor of Surgery in 1951, and became a Doctor of Medicine (MD) in 1969. At University College Hospital, London, he achieved a Diploma in Obstetrics (DObst RCOG), Diploma in Child Health and a Diploma in Public Health in the time from 1956 to 1965. In 1981, he succeeded to the barony of Rea.

== Career ==
Rea served as acting sergeant in the Suffolk Regiment between 1946 and 1948, and held various Junior hospital posts between 1954 and 1957. He was research fellow in paediatrics in Ibadan and Lagos in Nigeria from 1962 to 1965, and lecturer in social medicine at St Thomas's Hospital Medical School in London from 1966 to 1968. From 1957 to 1962, and from 1968 to 1993, he also worked as general practitioner in North London.

== Politics ==
Rea was a member of Amicus, Healthlink Worldwide and the Mary Ward Centre. He supported the Mother and Child Foundation, the Caroline Walker Trust and was honourable secretary of the National Heart Forum. He was a fellow of the Royal Society of Medicine and one of the ninety elected hereditary peers to remain in the House of Lords after the House of Lords Act 1999.

== Personal life ==
In 1951, Rea married Elizabeth Robinson, with whom he had four sons, Matthew James, Daniel William, Quentin Thomas and John Silas Nathaniel. With other partners he had daughters Bess Connif and Ella ‘Rosy' Amy Benjamin. He married Judith Mary Powell in 1991, the same year he divorced his first wife.

He died on 1 June 2020 at the age of 91.

Coat of arms of Nicolas Rea, 3rd Baron Rea
Crest A stag at gaze Gules resting the dexter fore-leg on an anchor Or. Escutcheon Or on a fess wavy Azure between three stags courant Gules a lymphad sails furled of the field. Supporters On either side a stag Gules each charged on the shoulder with a bezant thereon an anchor Azure. Motto In Omnia Promptus

Peerage of the United Kingdom
Preceded by Philip Rea	Baron Rea; 1981–2020; Member of the House of Lords (1982–1999)	Succeeded by Matthew Rea
Parliament of the United Kingdom
New office created by the House of Lords Act 1999	Elected hereditary peer to the House of Lords under the House of Lords Act 1999; 1999–2020	Succeeded by The Viscount Stansgate
