= Philip Rea, 2nd Baron Rea =

British hereditary peer, Liberal politician and merchant banker

The Right Honourable The Lord Rea PC
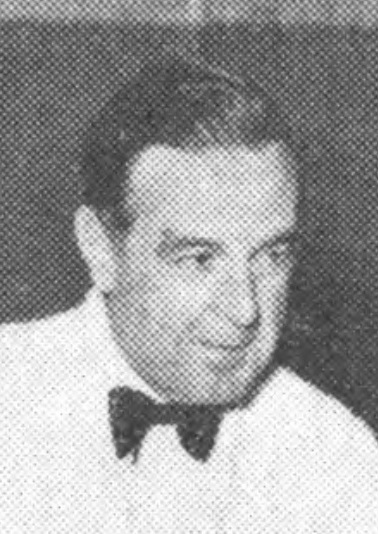
- Philip Rea

Leader of the Liberal Party in the House of Lords
- In office 1955–1967
- Preceded by: The Viscount Samuel
- Succeeded by: The Lord Byers

Member of the House of Lords Lord Temporal
- In office 26 May 1948 – 22 April 1981; Hereditary Peerage
- Preceded by: The 1st Lord Rea
- Succeeded by: The 3rd Lord Rea

Personal details
- Born: Philip Russell Rea; 7 February 1900
- Died: 22 April 1981 (aged 81)
- Party: Liberal
- Spouse: Lorna Smith (m. 1922; died 1978)
- Children: 2
- Education: Westminster School
- Alma mater: Oxford University; University of Grenoble

Coat of arms of Philip Rea, 2nd Baron Rea
| Crest A stag at gaze Gules resting the dexter fore-leg on an anchor Or. Escutcheon Or on a fess wavy Azure between three stags courant Gules a lymphad sails furled of the field. Supporters On either side a stag Gules each charged on the shoulder with a bezant thereon an anchor Azure. Motto In Omnia Promptus |

Philip Russell Rea, 2nd Baron Rea, PC (7 February 1900 – 22 April 1981) was a British hereditary peer, Liberal politician and merchant banker.

The eldest son of Walter Rea, a Liberal politician, and his first wife, Evelyn, Rea was educated at Westminster School, and then at Christ Church, Oxford University, where he graduated BA and later MA, and lastly at the University of Grenoble.

In 1918, during the closing stages of the First World War, he served as a second lieutenant in the Grenadier Guards. During the Second World War he returned to the British Army and served as personal staff officer to Brigadier Colin Gubbins, Head of the Special Operations Executive, a key British intelligence and guerrilla operations agency. He was an officer of the King's Royal Rifle Corps.

Lord Rea served as Leader of the Liberal Party in the House of Lords from 1955 to 1967. In the Lords he had been Chief Liberal Whip from 1950 to 1955, a Deputy Speaker from 1954, and Deputy Chairman of Committees 1950 to 1955. He was president of the Liberal Party between 1955 and 1956, and a party vice-president from 1970. He was made a Privy Councillor in 1962.

Rea married Lorna Smith (died 11 December 1978) on 7 April 1922. They had a son and daughter, but as his son Piers Russell Rea (1925–1934) died young, he was succeeded by Nicolas Rea, the son of his younger brother James Russell Rea (1902–1954).

His daughter, the Hon. Ann Felicity Rea (born 1923) served in the WRNS in the Second World War and married SOE veteran Malcolm Munthe in 1945.

Party political offices
| Preceded by The Lord Moynihan | Chairman of the Liberal Party; 1950–1952 | Succeeded by Philip Fothergill |
| Preceded by Graham White | President of the Liberal Party; 1955 | Succeeded by Leonard Behrens |
| Preceded by The Viscount Samuel | Leader of the Liberals in the House of Lords; 1955–1967 | Succeeded by The Lord Byers |
Peerage of the United Kingdom
| Preceded by Walter Rea | Baron Rea; 1948–1981 | Succeeded by Nicolas Rea |
