= Bradford North =

Parliamentary constituency in the United Kingdom, 1918–2010

Coordinates: 53°49′N 1°45′W

- Former borough constituency for the House of Commons
- Boundary of Bradford North in West Yorkshire for the 2005 general election

- Location of West Yorkshire within England
- County: 1918–1974: West Riding of Yorkshire; 1974–2010: West Yorkshire
- Major settlements: Bradford

1918–2010
- Seats: One
- Created from: Bradford East
- Replaced by: Bradford East

Bradford North was a borough constituency represented in the House of Commons of the Parliament of the United Kingdom. Until it was abolished for the 2010 general election, it elected one Member of Parliament (MP) by the first past the post system of election.

== Constituency profile ==
In 1981, 15% of the constituency were non-White.

== Boundaries ==
1918–1950: The County Borough of Bradford wards of Allerton, Bolton, Eccleshill, Heaton, Idle, and Thornton.

1950–1955: The County Borough of Bradford wards of Allerton, Bolton, Eccleshill, Heaton, and Idle.

1955–1974: The County Borough of Bradford wards of Bolton, Bradford Moor, Eccleshill, Idle, and North East.

1974–1983: The County Borough of Bradford wards of Bolton, Bowling, Bradford Moor, Eccleshill, Idle, Laisterdyke, and Undercliffe.

1983–2010: The City of Bradford wards of Bolton, Bowling, Bradford Moor, Eccleshill, Idle, and Undercliffe.

The constituency covered the northern part of Bradford.

Following the review of parliamentary representation in West Yorkshire by the Boundary Commission for England, Bradford was significantly altered, and the resulting constituency was renamed as Bradford East, with effect from the 2010 general election.

== Members of Parliament ==
Election	Member	Party
1918	Archibald Boyd-Carpenter	Unionist
1923	Walter Rea	Liberal
1924	Eugene Ramsden	Unionist
1929	Norman Angell	Labour
1931	Eugene Ramsden	Conservative
1945	Muriel Nichol	Labour
1950	William Taylor	Conservative
1964	Ben Ford	Labour
1983	Geoffrey Lawler	Conservative
1987	Pat Wall	Labour
1990 by-election	Terry Rooney	Labour
2010	constituency abolished	

== Elections ==
This constituency was replaced by Bradford East for the 2010 general election.

=== Elections in the 1910s ===
General election 1918: Bradford North
Party		Candidate	Votes	%	±%
C	Unionist	Archibald Boyd-Carpenter	11,042	49.7	
	Labour	John Palin	6,499	29.2	
	Liberal	Everett Binns	4,688	21.1	
Majority			4,543	20.5	
Turnout			22,229	67.3	
	Unionist win (new seat)				
C indicates candidate endorsed by the coalition government.

=== Elections in the 1920s ===
General election 1922: Bradford North
Party	Candidate	Votes	%	±%
Unionist	Archibald Boyd-Carpenter	10,260	36.5	−13.2
Liberal	Walter Rea	9,008	32.0	+10.9
Labour	John Palin	8,869	31.5	+2.3
Majority		1,252	4.5	−16.0
Turnout		28,137	84.0	+12.7
Unionist hold		Swing		

General election 1923: Bradford North
Party	Candidate	Votes	%	±%
Liberal	Walter Rea	9,365	34.0	+2.0
Unionist	Archibald Boyd-Carpenter	9,192	33.3	−3.2
Labour	Thomas Blythe	9,036	32.7	+1.2
Majority		173	0.7	N/A
Turnout		27,593	81.7	−2.3
Liberal gain from Unionist		Swing	+2.6	

General election 1924: Bradford North
Party	Candidate	Votes	%	±%
Unionist	Eugene Ramsden	11,459	39.6	+6.3
Labour	Frank Wise	9,442	32.7	0.0
Liberal	Walter Rea	8,007	27.7	−6.3
Majority		2,017	6.9	N/A
Turnout		28,908	84.7	+3.0
Unionist gain from Liberal		Swing		

General election 1929: Bradford North
Party	Candidate	Votes	%	±%
Labour	Norman Angell	17,873	41.0	+8.3
Unionist	Eugene Ramsden	15,413	35.4	−4.2
Liberal	Joseph Burton Hobman	10,290	23.6	−4.1
Majority		2,460	5.6	N/A
Turnout		43,576	84.5	−0.2
Labour gain from Unionist		Swing	+6.2	

=== Elections in the 1930s ===
General election 1931: Bradford North
Party	Candidate	Votes	%	±%
Conservative	Eugene Ramsden	31,537	71.8	+36.4
Labour	Philip Butler	12,401	28.2	−12.8
Majority		19,136	43.6	N/A
Turnout		43,938	83.1	−1.4
Conservative gain from Labour		Swing		

General election 1935: Bradford North
Party	Candidate	Votes	%	±%
Conservative	Eugene Ramsden	21,150	53.0	−18.8
Labour	Muriel Nichol	14,047	35.2	+7.0
National Dividend	Reginald Kenney	4,684	11.7	New
Majority		7,103	17.8	−25.8
Turnout		39,881	72.3	−8.8
Conservative hold		Swing		

General Election 1939–40:

Another General Election was required to take place before the end of 1940. The political parties had been making preparations for an election to take place from 1939 and by the end of this year, the following candidates had been selected;

- National Labour: George R Carter
- Labour: Muriel Nichol

=== Elections in the 1940s ===
General election 1945: Bradford North
Party	Candidate	Votes	%	±%
Labour	Muriel Nichol	20,268	43.6	+8.4
Conservative	John Andrews Benn	16,824	36.2	−16.8
Liberal	Basil Robert Wilson Town	9,337	20.1	New
Majority		3,444	7.4	N/A
Turnout		46,429	79.6	+7.3
Labour gain from Conservative		Swing	+12.7	

=== Elections in the 1950s ===
General election 1950: Bradford North
Party	Candidate	Votes	%	±%
National Liberal	William Taylor	20,628	45.71	
Labour	Muriel Nichol	18,517	41.03	
Liberal	Jack Kitching	5,985	13.26	
Majority		2,111	4.68	N/A
Turnout		45,130	87.70	
National Liberal gain from Labour		Swing		

General election 1951: Bradford North
Party	Candidate	Votes	%	±%
National Liberal	William Taylor	24,524	54.29	
Labour	Edward J Parris	20,647	45.71	
Majority		3,877	8.58	
Turnout		45,171	87.14	
National Liberal hold		Swing		

General election 1955: Bradford North
Party	Candidate	Votes	%	±%
National Liberal	William Taylor	21,084	50.08	
Labour	Maurice Webb	21,015	49.92	
Majority		69	0.16	
Turnout		42,099	81.79	
National Liberal hold		Swing		

General election 1959: Bradford North
Party	Candidate	Votes	%	±%
National Liberal	William Taylor	22,850	53.10	
Labour	John Marshall	20,179	46.90	
Majority		2,671	6.20	
Turnout		43,029	82.82	
National Liberal hold		Swing		

=== Elections in the 1960s ===
General election 1964: Bradford North
Party	Candidate	Votes	%	±%
Labour	Ben Ford	17,905	43.61	
National Liberal	William Taylor	16,507	40.21	
Liberal	Edgar Robinson	6,642	16.18	N/A
Majority		1,398	3.40	
Turnout		41,054	80.40	
Labour gain from National Liberal		Swing		

General election 1966: Bradford North
Party	Candidate	Votes	%	±%
Labour	Ben Ford	21,727	55.35	
Conservative	WH Peter Laycock	17,528	44.65	
Majority		4,199	10.70	
Turnout		39,255	77.71	
Labour hold		Swing		

=== Elections in the 1970s ===
General election 1970: Bradford North
Party	Candidate	Votes	%	±%
Labour	Ben Ford	20,141	52.11	
Conservative	WH Peter Laycock	18,511	47.89	
Majority		1,630	4.22	
Turnout		38,652	73.84	
Labour hold		Swing		

General election February 1974: Bradford North
Party	Candidate	Votes	%	±%
Labour	Ben Ford	22,381	43.34	
Conservative	Patrick Thompson	15,764	30.52	
Liberal	Gordon Lishman	13,115	25.39	New
Independent	A Marriott	386	0.75	New
Majority		6,617	12.82	
Turnout		51,646	78.84	
Labour hold		Swing		

General election October 1974: Bradford North
Party	Candidate	Votes	%	±%
Labour	Ben Ford	22,841	49.05	
Conservative	Patrick Thompson	14,252	30.60	
Liberal	Gordon Lishman	9,475	20.35	
Majority		8,589	18.45	
Turnout		46,568	70.41	
Labour hold		Swing		

General election 1979: Bradford North
Party	Candidate	Votes	%	±%
Labour	Ben Ford	25,069	50.94	
Conservative	Neil Hamilton	17,548	35.66	
Liberal	A Bagshawe	5,819	11.83	
National Front	Andrew Brons	614	1.25	
Workers Revolutionary	CE Smith	158	0.32	
Majority		7,521	15.28	
Turnout		49,208	71.81	
Labour hold		Swing		

=== Elections in the 1980s ===
General election 1983: Bradford North
Party	Candidate	Votes	%	±%
Conservative	Geoffrey Lawler	16,094	34.3	
Labour	Pat Wall	14,492	30.9	
SDP	Peter Birkby	11,962	25.5	
Independent Labour	Ben Ford	4,018	8.6	New
Monster Raving Loony	Arthur Howarth	194	0.4	New
BNP	Michael Easter	193	0.4	New
Majority		1,602	3.4	N/A
Turnout		46,953	70.8	−1.0
Conservative gain from Labour		Swing		

General election 1987: Bradford North
Party	Candidate	Votes	%	±%
Labour	Pat Wall	21,009	42.8	+11.9
Conservative	Geoffrey Lawler	19,376	39.5	+5.2
SDP	Adrian Berkley	8,656	17.7	−7.8
Majority		1,633	3.3	N/A
Turnout		49041	72.7	+1.9
Labour gain from Conservative		Swing	+6.7	

=== Elections in the 1990s ===
1990 Bradford North by-election
Party	Candidate	Votes	%	±%
Labour	Terry Rooney	18,619	51.7	+8.9
Liberal Democrats	David Ward	9,105	25.3	+7.6
Conservative	Joy Atkin	6,048	16.8	−22.7
Islamic Party	David Pidcock	800	2.2	New
Green	Michael Knott	447	1.2	New
National Front	Robert Tenney	305	0.8	New
Independent	Joseph Floyd	219	0.6	New
Monster Raving Loony	Wild Willi Beckett	210	0.6	New
Liberal	Noel Nowosielski	187	0.5	New
Ind. Conservative	Malcolm Wigglesworth	89	0.2	New
Majority		9,514	26.4	+23.1
Turnout		36,029	53.4	−19.3
Labour hold		Swing		

General election 1992: Bradford North
Party	Candidate	Votes	%	±%
Labour	Terry Rooney	23,420	47.8	+5.0
Conservative	Mohammed Riaz	15,756	32.2	−7.3
Liberal Democrats	David Ward	9,133	18.7	+1.0
Monster Raving Loony	Wild Willi Beckett	350	0.9	N/A
Islamic Party	Mohamed H. Nasr	304	0.6	N/A
Majority		7,664	15.6	+12.3
Turnout		48,963	73.4	+0.7
Labour hold		Swing	+10.8	

General election 1997: Bradford North
Party	Candidate	Votes	%	±%
Labour	Terry Rooney	23,493	56.1	+8.3
Conservative	Rasjid Skinner	10,723	25.6	−6.6
Liberal Democrats	Terry Browne	6,083	14.5	−4.2
Referendum	Harry Wheatley	1,227	2.9	New
Monster Raving Loony	Wild Willi Beckett	369	0.9	0.0
Majority		12,770	30.5	+14.9
Turnout		41,895	63.3	−10.1
Labour hold		Swing	+7.4	

=== Elections in the 2000s ===
General election 2001: Bradford North
Party	Candidate	Votes	%	±%
Labour	Terry Rooney	17,419	49.7	−6.4
Conservative	Zahid Iqbal	8,450	24.1	−1.5
Liberal Democrats	David Ward	6,924	19.8	+5.3
BNP	John Brayshaw	1,613	4.6	New
Green	Steven Schofield	611	1.7	New
Majority		8,969	25.6	−4.9
Turnout		35,017	52.7	−10.6
Labour hold		Swing	−10.6	

General election 2005: Bradford North
Party	Candidate	Votes	%	±%
Labour	Terry Rooney	14,622	42.5	―7.2
Liberal Democrats	David Ward	11,111	32.3	+12.5
Conservative	Teck Khong	5,569	16.2	―7.9
BNP	Lynda Cromie	2,061	6.0	+1.4
Green	Steven Schofield	560	1.6	―0.1
Respect	Umit Yildiz	474	1.4	New
Majority		3,511	10.2	―15.4
Turnout		34,397	53.3	+0.6
Labour hold		Swing	―9.8	

== See also ==
- List of parliamentary constituencies in West Yorkshire

== Notes and references ==
Craig, F. W. S. (1983). British parliamentary election results 1918-1949 (3 ed.). Chichester: Parliamentary Research Services. ISBN 0-900178-06-X.
