= Geoffrey Lawler =

Geoffrey John Lawler (born 30 October 1954) is a British public affairs consultant. He was a Conservative Party Member of Parliament, representing Bradford North from 1983 to 1987.

== Early life ==
Lawler was born in Nairobi, Kenya, where his father Major Ernest Lawler was serving. He went to primary schools in West Germany, and then to Colchester Royal Grammar School and to Richmond School in North Yorkshire. Lawler studied Economics and Accountancy at the University of Hull, where he was President of the Students' Union in 1976-77 (the first Conservative to hold the post).

== Political activity ==
Already active in Conservative politics, Lawler was an unsuccessful candidate for Humberside County Council in the 1977 elections. On graduating from university he briefly worked for Peat Marwick Mitchell before joining the Yorkshire Area of Conservative Central Office; he worked as a researcher in the Community Affairs department from 1978, moving in 1980 to the Research Department. In 1982, he became a public relations executive with Bulldog Publicity Services in Bradford. In January 1983 he was adopted as Conservative candidate for the Bradford North constituency; after boundary changes it was estimated that Labour had a 16% lead over the Conservatives in the seat.

== 1983 election ==
The election in Bradford North was one of the more high profile as the local Constituency Labour Party had deselected the sitting MP Ben Ford; Ford then stood as an Independent Labour candidate to try to keep his seat. His replacement as Labour candidate, Pat Wall, was a founder of the Militant tendency, and when Labour Party leader Michael Foot visited to support him, full-page newspaper adverts placed by the Conservative Party reprinted part of a speech in which Wall had declared that a Marxist Labour government, on coming to office "will face bloodshed. We will face the possibility of civil war and the terrible death and destruction and bloodshed that would mean". In addition, the SDP candidate Peter Birkby was a well known former Labour agent.

At the end of the campaign, Michael Foot was challenged by Robin Day in a televised interview to say whether he would back Pat Wall or Ben Ford. Foot replied "I'm not going to answer in that way". When the votes were counted, Lawler was declared elected with a majority of 1,602 over Pat Wall; he had won with only 34.3% of the vote but with the twelfth biggest swing to the Conservatives in Britain. Lawler became the first Conservative to win a Parliamentary seat in Bradford since 1970. He later declared that he had not expected to win.

== Parliament ==
Lawler made his maiden speech on 22 July in a debate on regional industrial policy; he complained that Yorkshire had suffered from an inequality of treatment, but that the regional assistance in the manner provided since the Second World War was inappropriate to contemporary needs. He did not support massive public intervention. After demanding an inquiry into under-employment, in late 1983 he called on the Government to abolish or privatise the Crown Agents. Lawler voted to reintroduce the death penalty for murderers of police or prison officers only, and against its reintroduction generally, in July 1983. In January 1985 he was one of 70 Conservative MPs to break the whip and vote to reject a planning inspectors' report supporting expansion of Stansted Airport.

In November 1984, his name was drawn as sixteenth in the annual ballot for twenty MPs to introduce a Private member's bill; he introduced the Fabric Origin Marking Bill which would require the country of origin to be indicated; his Bill made no progress. After the Bradford City stadium fire, he noted that the death toll would have been much worse had there been a fence in front of the stand to stop pitch invasions. He asked for money to be made available to build a new stand as quickly as possible.

Lawler spoke strongly in favour of televising the House of Commons in November 1985, arguing that if the public did not like what they saw, then Parliament should look to itself to change. In July 1986 he owned up to leading a plot among backbench MPs to make sure there were enough present at 1 AM to vote to increase the allowances used to pay for secretaries and researchers by 50%. The Government had proposed an increase of only 6% and Mrs Thatcher complained the following day about the increase in the cost of Parliament. As vice-chairman of the Conservative backbench employment committee, he protested against comments by Lord Chief Justice Lord Lane who had called for lower sentences for people found to have committed benefit fraud; Lawler described Lane's comments as "an affront to all law-abiding people who declare their incomes and pay all their taxes, and equally to those who are honest claimants of social security and depend on it for their income".

== Leaving Parliament ==
Due to the circumstances of his 1983 win, Lawler's chances of retaining the seat at any subsequent election were not rated highly; Lawler himself knew that his seat was "highly risky". He made strenuous efforts to attract the votes of Asian residents of the constituency, who did not traditionally vote Conservative. Although the Conservative vote in Bradford North increased by more than 3,000, Lawler was defeated in the 1987 election by Pat Wall, who was standing again, by 1,633 votes. He noted that being an MP "doesn't give you many additional recognisable skills other than being a good communicator", but since he had previously worked in public relations before his election, he returned to the same field.

Lawler subsequently submitted his name for selection in several constituencies for the 1992 general election (among them Finchley, following Margaret Thatcher's announcement of her retirement) but after several narrow defeats was not selected anywhere. In 1991 he set up on his own as managing director of The Public Affairs Company, a political consultancy based in Leeds. A few days after the 2005 general election, Lawler wrote to The Times to remark that the Conservative Party's strategy was "misconceived" and that the negative tone "repelled many people and buried the positive reasons that would attract them to support the Conservatives"; he appeared to blame Lynton Crosby by calling for no more immigration by "election experts from Australia".

In 2010 Lawler joined Keene Public Affairs, and was promoted to its board of directors in July 2011.

Parliament of the United Kingdom
Preceded by Ben Ford	Member of Parliament for Bradford North; 1983–1987	Succeeded by Pat Wall
