= Muriel Nichol =

British politician

Muriel Nichol JP
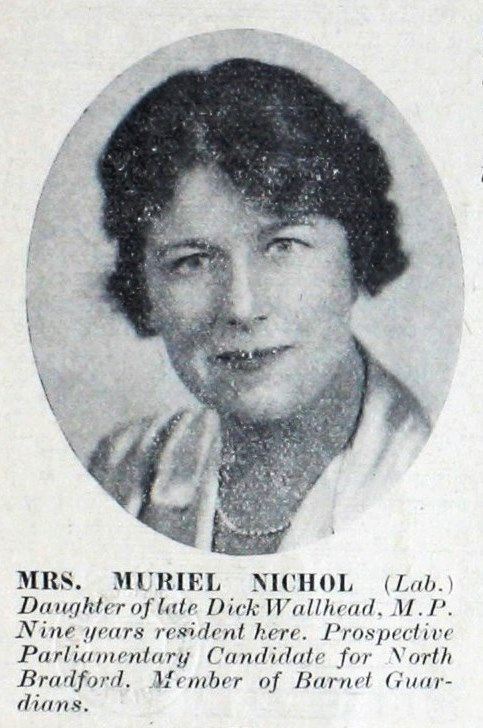
- Nichol in 1938

Member of Parliament for Bradford North
- In office 5 July 1945 – 3 February 1950
- Prime Minister: Clement Attlee
- Preceded by: Eugene Ramsden
- Succeeded by: William Taylor

Personal details
- Born: Muriel Edith Wallhead; 2 February 1893 Wilmslow, Cheshire
- Died: 28 May 1983 (aged 90) Welwyn Garden City, Hertfordshire
- Party: Labour

Muriel Edith Nichol JP (2 February 1893 Wilmslow, Cheshire – 28 May 1983 Welwyn Garden City, Hertfordshire), née Wallhead, was a Labour Party politician in England.

== Early life ==
The daughter of Richard Wallhead (Independent Labour Party chairman 1920–1922 and MP for Merthyr 1922–1934) was married with one son, and worked as a teacher before entering parliament. She served as Chair of Welwyn Garden City Urban District Council from 1937 to 1945.

== Political career ==
At the 1935 general election, she stood unsuccessfully in the Bradford North constituency in West Yorkshire, losing by a wide margin to the sitting Conservative Party member of parliament (MP) Eugene Ramsden. In the Labour landslide at the 1945 general election, she unseated Ramsden, winning the seat with a majority of 3,444 (a swing of 12.7%).

After boundary changes for the 1950 general election, she lost her seat to the Conservative and National Liberal Party candidate, William Taylor. She was unsuccessful in seeking to return to Parliament for Stockport North in the 1955 general election.

Parliament of the United Kingdom
Preceded by Eugene Ramsden	Member of Parliament for Bradford North; 1945–1950	Succeeded by William Taylor
