= Ernest A. Cole =

British sculptor

Ernest Alfred Cole
- Born: 1890; Greenwich
- Died: 1979 (aged 88–89)
- Known for: Sculpture, printmaking

Ernest Alfred Cole (1890–1979) was a British sculptor and printmaker born in Greenwich, London. He studied at Goldsmiths' College School of Art and the Royal College of Art and in Italy and Paris. While at the RCA his work came to the attention of Selwyn Image and Charles Ricketts, the latter becoming a great supporter of Cole's work which he compared to that of Alfred Stevens. In 1913 a life size figure of John the Baptist by Cole was erected at Holland Park.

He was commissioned in 1914 by Ralph Knott to contribute twelve figure groups for the London County Hall, of which he completed five and a half before enlisting for military service in the Artists Rifles in 1916. He then served in France in 1917 as a second lieutenant in the 4th Reserve York and Lancaster Regiment before being transferred to military intelligence. After World War I Cole resumed his work, but Knott was dissatisfied with the work, and terminated his contract in 1921 with only six groups completed. Additional sculptures for County Hall were provided by Alfred Frank Hardiman in the late 1920s. Cole's work aroused some controversy at its unveiling, although he was still supported by Ricketts, Image and Laurence Binyon.

While in the United States on military intelligence during 1917–18, Cole met his wife, Laurie Manly (d.1957).

From 1921 to 1924, Cole continued his studies in New York, Italy and Germany before settling in Kingston, Kent. In 1924 he briefly succeeded Francis Derwent Wood as Professor of Sculpture at the Royal College of Art, but left after a few months. Afterwards, he and his wife lived reclusively in Kingston in a house which Cole had commissioned, claiming it was the first steel-frame bungalow to have been built. At the outbreak of World War II the Coles were briefly imprisoned under suspicion of being Fascist sympathists, due to Cole's subscription to Il Popolo d'Italia, and his wife apparently an admirer of and correspondent with Benito Mussolini.

Cole was reported as having destroyed much of his work soon after completion.
