= Pat Wall =

English Trotskyist political activist

Member of Parliament for Bradford North
- In office 11 June 1987 – 6 August 1990
- Preceded by: Geoffrey Lawler
- Succeeded by: Terry Rooney
- Majority: 1,633 (3.3%)

President of the Bradford Trades Council
- In office 1973–1990
- Preceded by: Ludwig Baruch
- Succeeded by: Ronnie Fieldhouse

Personal details
- Born: Charles Patrick Wall; 6 May 1933 Liverpool, England
- Died: 6 August 1990 (aged 57) Bradford, England
- Party: Labour
- Occupation: Trade unionist; activist

Charles Patrick Wall (6 May 1933 – 6 August 1990) was an English Trotskyist political activist who was the Labour Party Member of Parliament (MP) for Bradford North from 1987 until his death. Wall was a long-standing member of the Militant group.

== Early years ==
Born into a working class family on 6 May 1933, he began political activity when he was picked up on a canvass by a local activist in 1950. Wall adopted a Trotskyist outlook and joined the Deane-Grant group, the remnant of the Revolutionary Communist Party, which later became the Militant group. Wall became Garston Constituency Labour Party Secretary in 1952.

Wall played a role in moving the Liverpool Labour Party to the left in the late 1950s as a member of the (then) joint Liverpool Trades Council and Labour Party Executive. He was also one of the youngest Liverpool councillors in the 1950s.

== Involvement with revolutionary journals ==
Wall was associated with a series of journals aimed at leading and widening the influence of Trotskyism, and popularising it without compromising or diluting it. After National Service in the Army he returned to Liverpool and helped to produce the youth journal Rally, organ of the Walton Labour Youth League. Terry Harrison has described how when he joined the Labour Party Young Socialists in 1958, it was Wall and Rally that "invited me to make a real commitment to the ideas of Marxism, and made me realise what this meant". Wall was then on the editorial board of Socialist Fight (1958-1963), and played a leading role in launching and editing the newspaper Militant.

Wall's job as a mail-order company buyer eventually took him away from Liverpool to Market Harborough, and then to Bingley in Bradford, where he worked for the local council. It also took him abroad, and he established political contacts on his foreign travels in Sri Lanka, Hong Kong, South Korea and the United States. His assistance to Trotskyists in Sri Lanka in 1979 was still remembered in tributes sent in memoriam.

== Labour Party ==
Wall was a delegate from Shipley constituency to the Labour Party's annual conference in 1972. With Ray Apps, a fellow member of the Militant tendency, he proposed a composite motion calling for "an enabling Bill to secure the public ownership of major monopolies," which was passed by 3,501,000 votes to 2,497,000.

Wall stood for the Labour Party National Executive seven years in a row, from 1977 to 1983, achieving 103,000 votes in 1982, his highest vote and also the highest vote for someone who was neither an MP nor a former MP.

=== Bradford North ===
Wall became President of Bradford Trades Council in 1973, and in 1981 he won a reselection battle against the sitting MP for Bradford North, Ben Ford, by 35 votes to 28. Ford alleged irregularities in the selection procedure and it was re-run, but Wall won again, this time by 49 votes to 12, and replaced Ford as the Labour candidate.

During the general election in 1983 Wall faced press criticism for his Trotskyist views, particularly in The Sunday Times, which portrayed Wall as wanting "civil war" and "bloodshed"; in response a Militant editorial statement asserted that "Militant was in favour of a peaceful transformation of society. No supporter of Militant would ever advocate or encourage 'bloodshed' or 'civil war'. ... Pat was explaining that if there was any threat to a peaceful transformation of society, that threat would come from the capitalist class itself." Labour Party leader Michael Foot publicly denounced his candidacy during the 1983 campaign.

Wall lost the 1983 election, coming in second place with 14,492 votes (30.3 per cent), less than 2,000 votes behind the winning Conservative candidate Geoffrey Lawler, and ahead of the former Labour agent, Peter Birkby, standing for the SDP, and Ben Ford, the deselected incumbent Labour MP, standing as "Independent Labour".

Wall stood again in the same constituency in 1987 and was featured in the Conservative election broadcast of 27 May 1987, which attacked his candidacy because he was a Marxist. He was quoted as saying: "A Marxist Labour government would mean the abolition of the monarchy, the House of Lords, the sacking of the generals, the admirals, the air marshals, the senior civil servants, the police chiefs and in particular the judges." The Sun also featured a demand that Wall be defeated on the day of the election. Wall held public meetings and 17 workplace meetings in the constituency and won the seat, recording a 9.9 per cent swing from the SDP.

== Death ==
Following a long illness, Wall died in the intensive care unit at Bradford Royal Infirmary on 6 August 1990, aged 57. More than 700 people attended a memorial meeting held after his funeral, the speakers including Arthur Scargill, Max Madden MP, Dennis Skinner MP, Dave Nellist MP, Bob Cryer MP and Terry Fields MP.

Parliament of the United Kingdom
Preceded by Geoffrey Lawler	Member of Parliament for Bradford North; 1987–1990	Succeeded by Terry Rooney
Trade union offices
Preceded by Ludwig Baruch	President of Bradford Trades Council; 1973–1990	Succeeded by Ronnie Fieldhouse
