= Hellens =

Historic house in Herefordshire, England

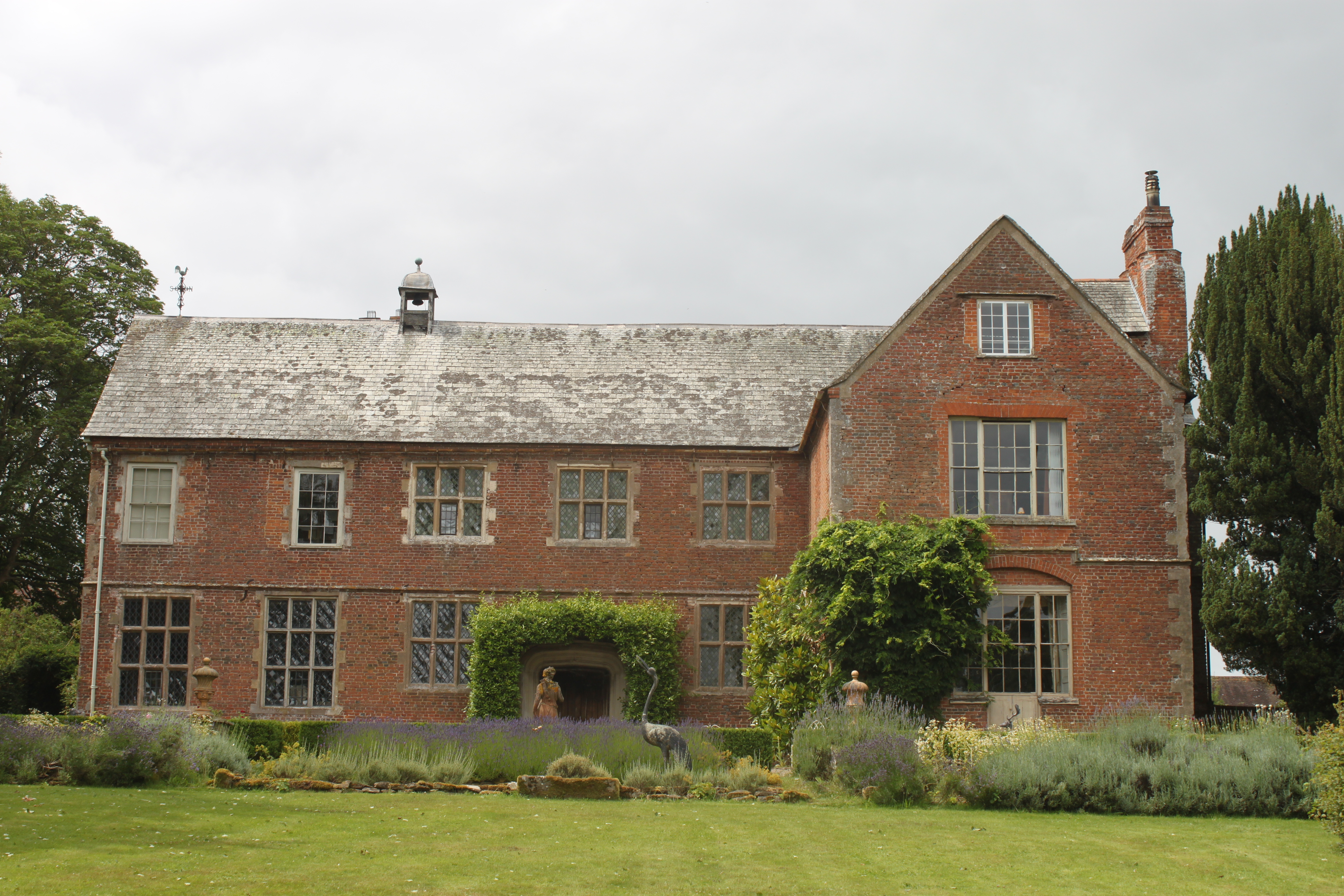
- The house viewed from the east
- Interactive map of the Hellens area

General information
- Location: Much Marcle, England
- Coordinates: 51.996294°N 2.495558°W

Website
- hellensmanor.com

Hellens Manor (also known as Hellens House or simply Hellens) is a historic house located in the village of Much Marcle in Herefordshire, England. It is one of the oldest dwellings in England, being composed primarily of Tudor, Jacobean and Georgian architecture but with foundations dating from the 12th century.

== History ==
Earl Harold Godwinson was Lord of Merkelan (Much Marcle), which included Hellens, from 1057 until his death as King at the Battle of Hastings in 1066. Thereafter William the Conqueror gave the manor to his standard bearer Walter de Lacy. He awarded the tythes to the monastic houses of Cormeilles Abbey and to Lyre Abbey in France. The whole was worth £30, an impressive sum for a Domesday Book village. By 1096 the manor had been granted to the de Balun family. The de Baluns were later to witness the signing of Magna Carta.

Hellens, or Helyons, as it was then called, is first specifically mentioned in 1180, by which time the de Baluns had been created Lords of the manor. In 1275 Sir Walter de Balun married Lord Roger Mortimer's sister Yseult (Isolde), and when Walter died she married Sir Hugh Audley. Their effigies can be seen in the parish church. Both of them, with Yseult's brother Roger, his mistress, Isabella of France, and the future Edward III of England, her son, are reputed to have waited in the great hall at Hellens for the Great Seal of England, delivered to them by William le Blount, on 26 November 1326. The Seal had been reclaimed from King Edward II, then imprisoned in Monmouth Castle. Mortimer and the queen are considered to have arranged for the brutal murder of the king in Berkeley Castle.

In 1337 Hugh Audley was created Earl of Gloucester, by virtue of his marriage to Margaret de Clare, granddaughter of Edward I, and widow of Piers Gaveston, Edward the Second's favourite. Hugh Audley died in 1347, and ownership of the Manor passed to his nephew, Sir James Audley, hero of the Froissart Chronicles, warrior at Crecy and Poitiers, boon companion to Edward the Black Prince, and a founding Knight of the Garter.

Sir James, living and fighting in France, leased the manor to Walter de Helyon, who passed it on to his daughter Joanna when she married Richard Walwyn. Their son bought the lordship of the manor in about 1403, and the property remained named after his grandfather. A wooden effigy of Walter de Helyon lies in Much Marcle's parish church, St Bartholomew's.

The house continued in the Walwyn family, and when William Noble, High Sheriff of Herefordshire, married into the family he added their name to his own. The house passed to a great-nephew Edward Walwyn, and his descendant Ely married into the Cooke family. Charles Cooke, MP for Hereford between 1893 and 1900, was born at Hellens. Between 1909 and 1922 the house was rented by Alec and Ursula Whalley. Ursula was the sister of Lascelles Abercrombie, the poet, and Patrick Abercrombie, the town planner. In 1930 Blanche Walwyn Cooke sold the house to Lady Helena Gleichen, Queen Victoria's great-niece and friend of Axel Munthe. When Helena Gleichen left Hellens, the house was sold to Hilda Munthe.

Hellens still serves as a family home, but also as a centre for many cultural activities, owned and administered by the Pennington-Mellor-Munthe Charity Trust. The Trust supports the distinguished Ledbury Poetry Festival, and its chairman is a long-serving Patron of the festival. In addition the Trust created the Hellensmusic festival occurring yearly in May, and a concert programme throughout the year, where musicians of international reputation come to play, relax, and teach talented young students. The Trust supports Back to the Wild CIC, a Forest Schools initiative based on the Hellens estate.

== Features ==
Hellens is a living monument to much of England's history. Its collections contain numerous artefacts, including books, furniture, paintings and objets d'art. There are items associated with Anne Boleyn, Mary I, Elizabeth I, Charles I, Charles II, Philip Wharton, 1st Duke of Wharton, and of the house's inhabitants over the centuries. Among other items, a pardon for Richard Walwyn from Elizabeth I is displayed.

Cider mill (still used each autumn)

On one of the window panes of 'Hetty Walwyn's Room', named for Mehitabel, an 18th-century occupant confined there by her mother until her death after a failed elopement, is an inscription attributed to her which reads "It is a part of virtue to abstain from what we love if it will prove our bane".

The gardens follow Tudor style architecture and Jacobean patterns, and include a walled knot garden, a yew labyrinth, a Physic Garden, and a 17th-century octagonal dovecote. There is also a woodland and pond walk and an old cider mill, used every autumn at Big Apple weekend to make perry and cider. The stables contain a Derby coach.

There are also restored 16th century Tythe and Wain Barns, used for concerts, school visits, local community projects, and events of all kind, and Georgian Stables now remodelled for residential use.

== See also ==
- Media related to Hellens at Wikimedia Commons
