= List of Liberal Party (UK) MPs =

This is a list of Liberal Party MPs. It includes all members of Parliament elected to the British House of Commons representing the Liberal Party from 1922. This includes all those elected as National Liberals supporting David Lloyd George in 1922. Members of the Northern Ireland House of Commons or the European Parliament are not listed.

== List of MPs ==
=== A ===
- Thomas Raven Ackroyd, Manchester Moss Side, 1923–24
- Francis Dyke Acland, Richmond, 1906–10; North West Cornwall, 1910–22; Tiverton, 1923–24; North Cornwall, 1932–39
- William Ryland Dent Adkins, Middleton, 1906–1918; Middleton and Prestwich, 1918–1923
- Maurice Alexander, Southwark South East, 1922–1923
- Ronald Wilberforce Allen, Leicester South, 1923–24
- Robert Alstead, Altrincham, 1923–24
- David Alton, Liverpool Mossley Hill, 1979–88
- Paddy Ashdown, Yeovil, 1983–88
- Sir Robert Aske, Newcastle upon Tyne East, 1923–1924, 1929–31
- H. H. Asquith, East Fife 1886–1918, Paisley, 1920–24
- David Austick, Ripon, 1973–74

=== B ===
- Robert Noton Barclay, Manchester Exchange, 1923–24
- Charles Barrie, Banffshire, 1918–24
- Alan Beith, Berwick-upon-Tweed, 1973–88
- Hilaire Belloc, Salford South, 1906–1910
- William Wedgwood Benn, Tower Hamlets, St George, 1906–18; Edinburgh Leith, 1918–27
- Albert Bennett, Mansfield, 1922–1923
- Donald Bennett, Middlesbrough West, 1945
- Reginald Berkeley, Nottingham Central, 1923–24
- Robert Bernays, Bristol North, 1931–45
- Peter Bessell, Bodmin, 1964–70
- William Beveridge, Berwick-upon-Tweed, 1944–45
- Norman Birkett, Nottingham East, 1923–24, 29–31
- John Wycliffe Black, Harborough, 1923–24
- James Blindell, Holland with Boston, 1929–31
- Mark Bonham Carter, Torrington, 1958–59
- Alfred Bonwick, Chippenham, 1923–24
- William Bowdler, Holderness, 1922–1923
- Roderic Bowen, Cardiganshire, 1945–66
- Thomas Bramsdon, Portsmouth, 1900 & 1906–1910; Portsmouth Central, 1918–22 & 1923–24
- Frank Briant, Lambeth North, 1918–29; 31–34
- Ernest Brown, Rugby, 1923–24; Edinburgh Leith, 1927–31
- Malcolm Bruce, Gordon, 1983–88
- John Fowler Leece Brunner, Leigh, 1906–1910; Northwich, 1910–18; Southport, 1923–24
- Leslie Burgin, Luton, 1929–31
- James Burnie, Bootle, 1923–24
- James Ramsay Montagu Butler, Cambridge University, 1922–1923
- Frank Byers, North Dorset, 1945–50

=== C ===
- Menzies Campbell, North East Fife, 1987–88
- Henry Campbell-Bannerman, Stirling Burghs, 1868–1908
- Alex Carlile, Montgomeryshire, 1983–88
- William Chapple, Stirlingshire, 1910–18; Dumfriesshire, 1922–24
- Edgar Chatfeild-Clarke, Isle of Wight, 1922–1923
- Winston Churchill, Oldham, 1904–06; Manchester North West 1906–08; Dundee 1908–22
- Clifford Cory, St Ives, 1906–24
- Godfrey Collins, Greenock, 1910–31
- Pat Collins, Walsall, 1922–24
- Levi Collison, Penrith and Cockermouth, 1922–1923
- Arthur Comyns Carr, Islington East, 1923–24
- Leonard Costello, Huntingdonshire, 1923–24
- William Dingwall Mitchell Cotts, Western Isles, 1922–1923
- Dugald McCoig Cowan, Combined Scottish Universities, 1918–33
- Horace Crawfurd, Walthamstow West, 1924–29
- Aaron Curry, Bishop Auckland 1931–1935

=== D ===
- Charles Darbishire, Westbury, 1922–24
- James Davidson, West Aberdeenshire, 1966–70
- Clement Davies, Montgomeryshire, 1929–31; 42–62
- David Davies, Montgomeryshire, 1906–29
- John Cledwyn Davies, Denbigh 1922–1923
- Seaborne Davies, Caernarvon Boroughs, 1945
- Ellis William Davies, Denbigh, 1923–29
- John Purcell Dickie, Gateshead, 1923–24; Consett, 1931–35
- Stephen Roxby Dodds, Wirral, 1923–24
- John Duckworth, Blackburn, 1923–29
- Cecil Dudgeon, Galloway, 1922–24, 29–31
- John Freeman Dunn, Hemel Hempstead, 1923–24
- Sir William Dunn, 1st Baronet, of Lakenheath, Paisley, 1891–1906

=== E ===
- William Edge, Bolton, 1916–23; Bosworth, 1927–31
- Garnham Edmonds, Bethnal Green North East, 1922–1923
- John Hugh Edwards, Mid Glamorgan, 1910–18; Neath, 1918–22; Accrington, 1924–29
- Sir Ellis Ellis-Griffith, 1st Baronet, Anglesey, 1895–1918; Carmarthen, 1923–24
- John Emlyn Emlyn-Jones, North Dorset, 1922–24
- Abraham England, Heywood and Radcliffe, 1922–24; 24–31
- Cyril Entwistle, Kingston upon Hull South West, 1918–24
- Arthur Evans, Leicester East, 1922–1923
- Ernest Evans, Cardiganshire, 1921–1923; University of Wales, 1924–43
- Owen Evans, Cardiganshire, 1932–45
- Richard Thomas Evans, Carmarthen, 1931–35

=== F ===
- Richard Robert Fairbairn, Worcester, 1922–1923
- James Falconer, Forfarshire, 1909–18 & 1922–24
- Ronald Fearn, Southport, 1987–88
- Thomas Fenby, Bradford East, 1924–29
- Henry Fildes, Stockport, 1920–1923; Dumfriesshire
- Victor Harold Finney, Hexham, 1923–24
- Herbert Fisher, Sheffield Hallam, 1916–18; Combined English Universities, 1918–26
- Reginald Fletcher, Basingstoke, 1923–24
- Dingle Foot, Dundee, 1931–45
- Isaac Foot, Bodmin, 1922–24; 29–35
- Walter Forrest, Batley and Morley, 1924–29
- Leonard Benjamin Franklin, Hackney Central, 1923–24
- Clement Freud, Isle of Ely, 1973–83; North East Cambridgeshire, 1983–87

=== G ===
- James Gardiner, Kinross and Western Perthshire, 1918–1923
- George Morgan Garro-Jones, Hackney South, 1924–29
- James Daniel Gilbert, West Newington, 1916–1918; Southwark Central, 1923–1924
- Charles Gilpin (politician), Northampton constituency, 1857–1874
- Alec Ewart Glassey, East Dorset, 1929–31
- Edgar Granville, Eye, 1929–31; 1945–51,
- William Gorman, Royton, 1923–24
- Frank Gray, Oxford, 1922–24
- Milner Gray, Mid Bedfordshire, 1929–31
- George Charles Grey, Berwick-upon-Tweed, 1941–44
- Edward Grigg, Oldham, 1922–25
- Frank Kingsley Griffith, Middlesbrough West, 1928–40
- Jo Grimond, Orkney and Shetland, 1950–83
- William John Gruffydd, University of Wales, 1943–50
- Frederick Guest, Dorset East, 1910–1922; Stroud, 1923–24; Bristol North, 1924–1929
- Henry Guest, East Dorset, June–December 1910, Pembroke and Haverfordwest, December 1910 – 1918, Bristol North, 1922–1923.
- Thomas Maule Guthrie, Moray and Nairn, 1922–1923

=== H ===
- John Hancock, Mid Derbyshire, 1909–1918; Belper, 1918–1923
- Arthur Harbord, Great Yarmouth, 1922–24; 29–31
- Edward Harney, South Shields, 1922–29
- Thomas Edmund Harvey, Leeds West, 1910–18; Dewsbury, 1923–24; Combined English Universities, 1937–45
- Robert William Hamilton, Orkney and Shetland, 1922–35
- John Hobbis Harris, Hackney North, 1923–24
- Percy Alfred Harris, Harborough, 1916–18; Bethnal Green South West, 1922–45
- Thomas Henderson, Roxburgh and Selkirk, 1922–1923
- Albert Ernest Hillary, Harwich, 1922–24
- Frederick Hindle, Darwen, 1923–24
- John Hinds, West Carmarthenshire, December 1910 – 1918; Carmarthen, 1918–1923
- Arthur Hobhouse, Wells, 1923–24
- James Philip Hodge, Preston, 1922–1924
- Henry Cairn Hogbin, Battersea North, 1923–24
- James Myles Hogge, Edinburgh East, 1912–24
- Herbert Holdsworth, Bradford South, 1931–45
- Arthur Holt, Bolton West, 1951–64
- Emlyn Hooson, Montgomeryshire, 1962–79
- Rhys Hopkin Morris, Cardiganshire, 1923–32; Carmarthen, 1945–56
- Tom Horabin, North Cornwall, 1939–47
- Leslie Hore-Belisha, Plymouth Devonport, 1923–31
- Geoffrey Howard, Eskdale, 1906–10; Westbury, 1911–18; Luton, 1923–24
- Geraint Howells, Cardigan, 1974–83; Ceredigion and Pembrokeshire North, 1983–88
- Simon Hughes, Bermondsey, 1983; Southwark and Bermondsey, 1983–88
- Joseph Hunter, Dumfriesshire, 1931–34
- Robert Hutchison, Kirkcaldy Burghs, 1922–1923; Montrose Burghs, 1924–32

=== J ===
- Barnett Janner, Whitechapel and St Georges, 1931–35
- William Albert Jenkins, Brecon and Radnor, 1922–24
- Russell Johnston, Inverness, 1964–83; Inverness, Nairn and Lochaber, 1983–88
- Harcourt Johnstone, Willesden East, 1923–24; South Shields, 1931–35; Middlesbrough West, 1940–45
- Charles Sydney Jones, Liverpool West Derby, 1923–24
- Henry Haydn Jones, Merioneth, 1910–45
- (John) Henry Morris-Jones, Denbigh, 1929–31
- Leif Jones, Camborne, 1923–24; 29–31
- William Nathaniel Jones, Carmarthen, 1928–29
- William Allen Jowitt, The Hartlepools, 1922–24; Preston, 1929

=== K ===
- Robert Newbald Kay, Elland, 1923–24
- Roderick Morris Kedward, Bermondsey West, 1923–24; Ashford, 1929–31
- Thomas Keens, Aylesbury, 1923–24
- Sir George Kemp, Heywood, 1895–1906, Manchester North West, 1910–12
- Joseph Kenworthy, Kingston upon Hull Central, 1919–26
- Barnet Kenyon, Chesterfield, 1913–1929
- Archy Kirkwood, Roxburgh and Berwickshire, 1983–88

=== L ===
- George Lambert, North Devon, 1891–1918; South Molton, 1918–24; 29–31
- Wallace Lawler, Birmingham Ladywood, 1969–70
- Frederick Joseph Laverack, Brixton, 1923–24
- Joseph Leckie, Walsall, 1931–38
- Edward Lessing, Abingdon, 1923–24
- Arthur Lever, Harwich, 1906–January 1910; Hackney Central, 1922–1923
- Thomas Arthur Lewis, Pontypridd, 1918–1922; University of Wales, 1922–1923
- Frederick Caesar Linfield, Mid Bedfordshire, 1922–24
- Alexander Livingstone, Western Isles, 1923–29
- Richard Livsey, Brecon and Radnorshire, 1985–88
- Frederick Llewellyn-Jones, Flintshire, 1929–31
- David Lloyd George, Caernarfon Boroughs, 1890–31; 35–45
- Gwilym Lloyd George, Pembrokeshire, 1922–24; 29–31; 35–50
- Megan Lloyd George, Anglesey, 1929–31; 1935–51
- John Frederick Loverseed, Sudbury, 1923–1924
- Eric Lubbock, Orpington, 1962–70
- William Lygon, East Norfolk, 1929–31
- Alexander Lyle-Samuel, Eye, 1918–1923

=== M ===
- William Mabane, Huddersfield, 1931–c35
- George Mackie, Caithness and Sutherland, 1964–66
- Charles McCurdy, Northampton, January 1910 – 1923
- Archie Macdonald, Roxburgh and Selkirk, 1950–51
- Murdo Macdonald, Inverness-shire, 1922–50
- Eric Macfadyen, Devizes, 1923–24
- William McKeag, City of Durham, 1931–35
- Alasdair Mackenzie, Ross and Cromarty, 1964–70
- Joseph Payton Maclay, Paisley, 1931–45
- Thomas James Macnamara, Camberwell North, 1900–1918; Camberwell North West, 1918–1924
- Ian Macpherson, 1st Baron Strathcarron, Ross and Cromarty, 1911–31
- Donald Maclean, Bath, 1906–10; Peebles and Selkirk, 1910–18; Peebles and South Midlothian, 1918–22; North Cornwall, 1929–31
- Sir George McCrae, Edinburgh East, 1899–1909; Stirling and Falkirk, 1923–24
- Henry Maden, Lonsdale, 1923–24
- Edward Lancelot Mallalieu, Colne Valley, 1931–35
- Geoffrey Mander, Wolverhampton East, 1929–35
- Courtenay Mansel, Penryn and Falmouth, 1923–24
- Croydon Marks, North Cornwall, 1918–24
- Arthur Harold Marshall, Wakefield, 1910–1918; Huddersfield, 1922–1923
- Albert Edward Martin, Romford, 1922–1923
- Frederick Martin, Aberdeen and Kincardine East, 1922–24
- David Marshall Mason, Edinburgh East, 1931–35
- C F G Masterman, West Ham North, 1906–11; Bethnal Green South West, 1911–14; Manchester Rusholme, 1923–24
- Christopher Mayhew, Woolwich East, 1974
- Michael Meadowcroft, Leeds West, 1983–87
- Hugh Meyler, Blackpool, 1923–24
- Ray Michie, Argyll and Bute, 1987–88
- James Duncan Millar, East Fife, 1922–24; 29–31
- Robert MacGregor Mitchell, Perth, 1923–24
- Alfred Mond, Chester, 1906–10; Swansea, 1910–18; Swansea West, 1918–23; Carmarthen, 1924–28
- Henry Mond, Isle of Ely, 1923–24
- Algernon Moreing, Buckrose, 1918–1922, Camborne, 1922–1923.
- Harold Morris, Bristol East, 1922–1923
- Rhys Hopkin Morris, Cardiganshire, 1923–1932; Carmarthen, 1945–1956
- George Alexander Morrison, Combined Scottish Universities, 1934–35
- William Ewart Morse, Bridgwater, 1923–24
- Hugh Moulton, Salisbury, 1923–24
- Ramsay Bryce Muir, Rochdale, 1923–24
- Arthur Murray, Kincardineshire, 1908–1918; Kincardine and Western Aberdeenshire, 19181–1923
- John Murray, Leeds West, 1918–1923
- Frank Murrell, Weston-super-Mare, 1923–24

=== N ===
- Harry Nathan, Bethnal Green North East, 1929–35
- Sir Henry Norman, Wolverhampton South, 1900–January 1910, Blackburn, December 1910 – 1923

=== O ===
- Philip Milner Oliver, Manchester Blackley, 1923–24; 29–31
- John Joseph O'Neill, Lancaster, 1923–24
- Frank Owen, Hereford, 1929–31
- Goronwy Owen, Caernarvonshire, 1923–31; 35–45

=== P ===
- John Pardoe, North Cornwall, 1966–79
- Thomas Henry Parry, Flint Boroughs, 1913–18; Flintshire, 1918–24
- Robert Pattinson, Grantham, 1922–1923
- Samuel Pattinson, Horncastle, 1922–24
- David Penhaligon, Truro, 1974–86
- Sidney John Peters, Huntingdonshire, 1929–31
- Hilton Philipson, Berwick-upon-Tweed, 1922–1923
- Vivian Phillipps, Edinburgh West, 1922–24
- Ernest Harold Pickering, Leicester West, 1931–35
- Robert Pilkington, Keighley, 1923–24
- Bill Pitt, Croydon North West, 1981–83
- Ernest Griffith Price, Shoreditch, 1922–1923
- William Pringle, North West Lanarkshire, 1910–18; Penistone, 1922–24
- Percy John Pybus, Harwich, 1929–31

=== R ===
- Henry Norman Rae, Shipley, 1918–1923
- Peter Wilson Raffan, Leigh, 1910–22; Edinburgh North, 1923–24
- Frank Raffety, Bath, 1923–24
- Cecil Beresford Ramage, Newcastle upon Tyne West, 1923–24
- T. B. Wilson Ramsay, Western Isles, 1929–31
- Hugh Reynolds Rathbone, Liverpool Wavertree, 1923–24
- Walter Russell Rea, Scarborough, 1906–1918; Bradford North, 1923–24; Dewsbury, 1931–35
- Tudor Rees, Barnstaple, 1918–22 & 1923–24
- Beddoe Rees, Bristol South, 1922–29
- Athelstan Rendall, Thornbury, 1906–22 & 1923–24
- Aled Owen Roberts, Wrexham, 1931–35
- Charles Henry Roberts, Lincoln, 1906–1918; Derby, 1922–1923
- Emrys Roberts, Merionethshire, 1945–51
- George Henry Roberts, Norwich, 1906–1923
- Wilfrid Roberts, North Cumberland, 1935–50
- Thomas Atholl Robertson, Finchley, 1923–24
- Sydney Walter Robinson, Chelmsford, 1923–24
- Thomas Robinson (Stretford politician), Stretford, 1918 -1929,
- William Edward Robinson, Stoke-on-Trent, Burslem, 1923–24
- Stephen Ross, Isle of Wight, 1974–87
- James A. de Rothschild, Isle of Ely, 1929–45
- Charles Royle, Stockport, 1923–24
- Charles Rudkin, Chichester, 1923–24
- Hilda Runciman, St Ives, 1928–29
- Walter Runciman Sr, The Hartlepools 1914–1918
- Walter Runciman, Oldham, 1899–1900; Dewsbury, 1902–18; Swansea West, 1924–29; St Ives, 1929–31
- Richard John Russell, Eddisbury, 1929–31

=== S ===
- Herbert Samuel, Cleveland, 1902–18; Darwen, 1929–35
- James Scott, Kincardine and West Aberdeenshire, 1929–31
- Hugh Seely, East Norfolk, 1923–24; Berwick-upon-Tweed, 1935–41
- J E B Seely, Isle of Wight, 1904– 06 & 1923–24; Liverpool Abercromby, 1906–10; Ilkeston, 1910–1922
- Geoffrey Hithersay Shakespeare, Norwich, 1929–31
- Alexander Shaw, Kilmarnock Burghs, 1915–1918; Kilmarnock, 1918–1923
- Elizabeth Shields, Ryedale, 1986–87
- Ernest Darwin Simon, Manchester Withington, 1923–24; 29–31
- John Simon, Walthamstow, 1906 – 18; Spen Valley, 1922 – 31
- John Hope Simpson, Taunton, 1922 – 24
- Archibald Sinclair, Caithness and Sutherland, 1922 – 45
- Cyril Smith, Rochdale, 1972 – 88
- Louis Spears, Loughborough, 1922 – 24
- Ernest Spero, Stoke Newington, 1923 – 24
- Herbert Harvey Spencer, Bradford South, 1922 – 24
- Charles Walter Starmer, Cleveland, 1923 – 24
- David Steel, Roxburgh, Selkirk and Peebles, 1965 – 83; Tweeddale, Ettrick and Lauderdale, 1983 – 88
- Henry Kenyon Stephenson, Sheffield Park, 1918 – 1923
- Sydney Stern, 1st Baron Wandsworth 1891- 95
- Innes Harold Stranger, Newbury, 1923 – 24
- Robert Strother Stewart, Stockton-on-Tees, 1923 – 24
- Edward Anthony Strauss, Southwark North, 1927 – 29
- John Leng Sturrock, Montrose Burghs, 1918 – 24
- Charles Summersby, Shoreditch, 1931 – 35
- Joseph Sunlight, Shrewsbury, 1923 – 24
- William Sutherland, Argyllshire, 1918 – 24

=== T ===
- John Lincoln Tattersall, Stalybridge and Hyde, 1923 – 24
- Matthew Taylor, Truro, 1987 – 88
- Lady Terrington, Wycombe, 1923 – 24
- Robert John Thomas, Wrexham, 1918 – 22; Anglesey, 1923 – 29
- Piers Gilchrist Thompson, Torquay, 1923 – 24
- Trevelyan Thomson, Middlesbrough West, 1918 – 28
- George Rennie Thorne, Wolverhampton East, 1908 – 29
- Maxwell Ruthven Thornton, Tavistock, 1922 – 24
- Jeremy Thorpe, North Devon, 1959 – 79
- Robert Parkinson Tomlinson, Lancaster, 1928 – 29
- Graham Tope, Sutton and Cheam, 1972 – 74
- Paul Tyler, Bodmin, 1974

=== V ===
- Henry Harvey Vivian, Birkenhead, 1906 – 10; Totnes, 1923 – 24

=== W ===
- Donald William Wade, Huddersfield West, 1950 – 64
- George Wadsworth, Buckrose, 1945 – 50
- Richard Wainwright, Colne Valley, 1966 – 70, 1974 – 87
- James Robert Wallace, Orkney and Shetland, 1983 – 88
- George Ward (Liberal MP), Bosworth, 1923 – 24
- John Ward, Stoke-on-Trent 1918 – 29
- Walter Waring, Banffshire, 1907 – 1918, Blaydon, 1918 – 1922, Berwick and Haddington, 1922 – 1923
- Courtenay Warner, North Somerset, 1892 – 1895; Lichfield, 1896 – 1923
- John Bertrand Watson, Stockton-on-Tees, 1917 – 1923
- Sir Henry "Harry" Webb, Forest of Dean, 1911 – 1918; Cardiff East, 1923 -1924
- Charles Frederick White, Derbyshire West, 1918 – 1923
- Henry Graham White, Birkenhead East, 1922 – 24; 1929 – 45
- Sir Luke White, Buckrose 1900 – 18
- John Henry Whitley, Halifax, 1900 – 28
- William Wiggins, Oldham, 1925 – 29
- Arnold Williams (Liberal MP), Sowerby, 1923 – 24
- Christmas Price Williams, Wrexham, 1924 – 29
- Penry Williams, Middlesbrough, 1910 – 18; Middlesbrough East, 1918 – 22 & 1923 – 24
- Ronald Samuel Ainslie Williams, Sevenoaks, 1923 – 24
- Herbert Willison, Nuneaton; 1923 – 24
- Sir Richard Winfrey, South West Norfolk, 1906 – 23; Gainsborough, 1923 – 24
- Michael Winstanley, Cheadle, 1966 – 70; Hazel Grove, 1974
- Margaret Wintringham, Louth, 1921 – 24
- Thomas Wintringham, Louth, 1920 – 21
- Murdoch McKenzie Wood, Central Aberdeenshire 1919 – 24, Banff, 1929 – 35
- George Woodwark, King's Lynn, 1923 – 24

=== Y ===
- Edward Hilton Young, Norwich, 1915 – 23; 24 – 26
- Ernest Young, Middlesbrough East, 1931 – 35

== Graphical representation (1945-1988) ==
Constituency	1945	47	1950	1951	55	57	58	1959	62	1964	65	1966	69	1970	72	73	Feb 74	74	Oct 74	79	1979	81	83	1983	85	86	87	1987
Montgomeryshire	Davies								Hooson															Carlile				
Cardiganshire / Ceredigion & Pembroke N (83)	Bowen																Howells											
Carmarthen	Morris																											
Anglesey	Lloyd George																											
Merionethshire	Roberts																											
Eye	Granville																											
Cumberland North	Roberts																											
Dorset North	Byers																											
Pembrokeshire	Lloyd-George																											
Buckrose	Wadsworth																											
University of Wales	Gruffydd																											
Cornwall North	Horabin											Pardoe																
Orkney and Shetland			Grimond																					Wallace				
Huddersfield West			Wade																									
Roxburgh & Selkirk / & Peebles (1955) / Tweeddale, Ettrick and Lauderdale (83)			Macdonald								Steel																	
Bolton West				Holt																								
Torrington							Bm-Carter																					
Devon North								Thorpe																				
Orpington									Lubbock																			
Inverness / Inv, Nairn & Lochaber (83)										Johnston																		
Bodmin										Bessell							Tyler											
Ross and Cromarty										Mackenzie																		
Caithness and Sutherland										Mackie																		
Aberdeenshire W / Gordon (1983)												Davidson												Bruce				
Cheadle												Winstanley																
Colne Valley												Wainwright					Wainwright											
Birmingham Ladywood													Lawler															
Rochdale															Smith													
Sutton and Cheam															Tope													
Berwick-upon-Tweed																Beith												
Isle of Ely / NE Cambridgeshire (83)																Freud												
Ripon																Austick												
Isle of Wight																	Ross											
Hazel Grove																	Winstanley											
Woolwich East																		Mayhew										
Truro																			Penhaligon								Taylor	
Liverpool Edge Hill / L Mossley Hill (83)																				Alton								
Croydon North West																						Pitt						
Bermondsey / Southwark & B'sey (83)																							Hughes					
Roxburgh and Berwickshire																								Kirkwood				
Yeovil																								Ashdown				
Leeds West																								Meadowcroft				
Brecon and Radnorshire																									Livsey			
Ryedale																										Shields		
North East Fife																												Campbell
Argyll and Bute																												Michie
Southport																												Fearn
	1945	47	1950	1951	55	57	58	1959	62	1964	65	1966	69	1970	72	73	Feb 74	74	Oct 74	79	1979	81	83	1983	85	86	87	1987
No. of Liberal MPs	12	11	9	6	6	5	6	6	7	9	10	12	13	6	8	11	14	15	13	14	11	12	13	17	18	19	19	17

== See also ==
- Category:Liberal MPs (UK)
