= Joseph Hepworth =

Joseph Hepworth may refer to:

- Joseph Hepworth (politician) (c. 1876–1945), British Conservative Party politician
- Joseph Hepworth (tailor) (1834–1911), clothing manufacturer who founded the United Kingdom's largest clothing company

== See also ==
- Joseph Hepworth & Son, clothing retailer founded by the tailor, now Next plc
