= Joseph Stanley Snowden =

Joseph Stanley Snowden (16 October 1901 – 22 January 1980), was a British Liberal Party politician and barrister.

== Background ==
He was the eldest son of Joseph Snowden and Fanny Ruth Snowden of Morecambe and Heysham, Lancashire. He was educated at Sedbergh School and St John's College, Cambridge. Law Tripos (Cantab) 1923 (BA, LLB). He married, in 1938, Agnes Enid Mitchell. They had no children.

== Professional career ==
He was Called to the Bar, Inner Temple, 1925. He joined the North-Eastern Circuit in 1925. He was Deputy Chairman, West Riding of Yorkshire Quarterly Sessions from 1960–71. He was Recorder of Scarborough from 1951–71. He was a Recorder and honorary Recorder of Scarborough from 1972–73. He was Chairman of the Yorkshire and Lancashire Agricultural Land Tribunal from 1963–71.

== Political career ==
He was active in Bradford and Yorkshire Liberal federations. He was Liberal candidate for the Bradford East Division of Yorkshire at the 1945 General Election.

General Election 1945: Bradford East Electorate 44,305
Party	Candidate	Votes	%	±%
Labour	Frank McLeavy	15,743	45.0	
Conservative	William Taylor	9,109	26.1	
Ind. Labour Party	William Ballantine	5,105	14.6	
Liberal	Joseph Snowden	5,010	14.3	
Majority		6,634	19.0	
Turnout			78.9	
Labour gain from Conservative		Swing		

He was Liberal candidate for the Bradford East Division of Yorkshire at the 1950 General Election.

General Election 1950: Bradford East Electorate 54,730
Party	Candidate	Votes	%	±%
Labour	Frank McLeavy	27,694	59.8	
National Liberal	Geoffrey F Greenbank	12,527	27.0	
Liberal	Joseph Snowden	5,565	12.0	
Communist	H Green	543	1.2	
Majority		15,167	32.7	
Turnout			84.6	
Labour hold		Swing		

He was Liberal candidate for the Dewsbury Division of Yorkshire at the 1951 General Election.

General Election 1951: Dewsbury Electorate 62,680
Party	Candidate	Votes	%	±%
Labour	William Paling	28,650	53.3	−0.4
Conservative	JE Ramsden	19,562	36.4	+3.4
Liberal	Joseph Snowden	5,584	10.4	−3.0
Majority		9,088	16.9	−3.7
Turnout		53,796	85.8	−2.1
Labour hold		Swing	-1.9	

He was Liberal candidate for the Dewsbury Division of Yorkshire at the 1955 General Election.

General Election 1955: Dewsbury Electorate 55,257
Party	Candidate	Votes	%	±%
Labour	William Paling	23,286	52.1	−1.1
Conservative	Michael Shaw	15,869	35.5	−0.9
Liberal	Joseph Snowden	5,516	12.4	+2.0
Majority		7,417	16.6	−0.2
Turnout		44,671	80.8	−5.0
Labour hold		Swing	-0.1	

He was Liberal candidate for the Pudsey Division of Yorkshire at the 1959 General Election.

General Election 1959: Pudsey Electorate 52,285
Party	Candidate	Votes	%	±%
Conservative	Joseph Hiley	22,752	50.1	2.4
Labour	Vincent P Richardson	16,241	35.8	−1.3
Liberal	Joseph Snowden	6,429	14.2	−1.1
Majority		6,511	14.3	3.7
Turnout		52,285	86.8	1.5
Conservative hold		Swing	1.8	
