= Angus Holden, 1st Baron Holden =

British politician (1833-1912)

Angus Holden 1st Baron Holden
- Angus Holden

Member of Parliament for Bradford East
- In office 1885–1886
- Preceded by: New constituency
- Succeeded by: Henry Byron Reed

Member of Parliament for Buckrose
- In office 1892–1900
- Preceded by: Christopher Sykes
- Succeeded by: Luke White

Personal details
- Born: 16 March 1833
- Died: 25 March 1912 (aged 79)
- Party: Liberal Party
- Parents: Isaac Holden (father); Marion Love (mother)
- Education: Wesley College, Sheffield

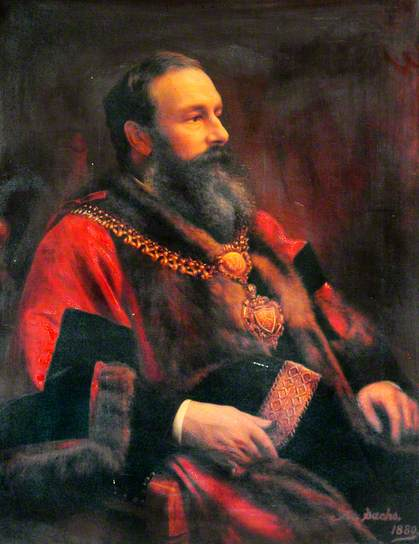
Angus Holden, painted in 1880 by Albert Sachs.

Angus Holden, 1st Baron Holden (16 March 1833 – 25 March 1912), was a British Liberal Party politician who was active in local government and sat in the House of Commons in two periods between 1885 and 1900. He was raised to the peerage as Baron Holden in 1908.

== Early life and education ==
Holden was the eldest son of Sir Isaac Holden, 1st Bt, M.P., of Oakworth House in Oakworth, near Keighley, and his wife Marion Love, daughter of Angus Love of Paisley, Scotland. He was educated at Edinburgh and at Wesley College, Sheffield. He was a partner in the firm of Isaac Holden & Sons, Wool Combers, of Alston Works, Bradford.

== Political career ==
Holden was mayor of Bradford in 1878, 1879, 1880 and 1886. In 1884 he stood unsuccessfully for parliament at a by-election at Knaresborough. At the 1885 general election, he was elected as the first MP for the Eastern Division of Bradford as a Liberal, but he lost the seat in the 1886 general election. He was mayor of Bradford again in 1886. At the 1892 general election he was returned as a Gladstonian Liberal for the Buckrose Division of the East Riding which he continued to represent until he retired from the House of Commons at the 1900 general election.

On the death of his father in 1897 he succeeded to the baronetcy, becoming Sir Angus Holden, 2nd Baronet. On 4 July 1908 he was raised to the peerage as Baron Holden, of Alston in the county of Cumberland.

== Personal life and death ==
After his death, he was succeeded in his titles by his son the Hon Ernest Illingworth Holden (born in 1867), who became the 3rd Baronet and the 2nd Baron Holden.

Parliament of the United Kingdom
New constituency	Member of Parliament for Bradford East; 1885–1886	Succeeded by Henry Byron Reed
Preceded by Christopher Sykes	Member of Parliament for Buckrose; 1892–1900	Succeeded by Luke White
Baronetage of the United Kingdom
Preceded by Sir Isaac Holden	Baronet (of Oakworth House); 1897–1912	Succeeded by Ernest Illingworth Holden
Peerage of the United Kingdom
New creation	Baron Holden; 1908–1912	Succeeded by Ernest Illingworth Holden
