= William Priestley (Liberal politician) =

British Liberal politician

William Priestley

Sir William Edwin Briggs Priestley (1859–1932) was a British Liberal politician from the West Riding of Yorkshire. He was Member of Parliament (MP) for Bradford East.

== Birth and early life ==
Born on 12 April 1859, he was the second son of Briggs Priestley, a Thornton-born millhand who became a major mill-owner in Bradford, was Mayor of Bradford for 1877–78, and sat as MP for neighbouring Pudsey from 1906 to 1919. His younger brother Arthur was MP for Grantham.

He was educated privately and at Harrogate College and, aged 16, received the Literate in Arts diploma awarded by Durham University. He displayed early promise as an artist and was the only candidate in his year to gain a certificate for watercolour painting in the Durham examination. His father and elder brother urged him to concentrate on developing his artistic skills, but he preferred to enter the family firm. His father's retirement and brother's early death left him, at the age of thirty-three, in control of the firm (Priestleys Limited) which then claimed to be "the largest manufacturer of All Wool Dress Goods in the world". Priestleys employed 1,200 hands in mills at Laisterdyke, Thornton and Idle, and had sales offices in London, Glasgow, New York and Montreal.

== Civic work ==
Priestley followed his father into the radical wing of the Liberal party, but regarded Alfred Illingworth as his "political father". Elected a Councillor for Bradford's premier ward in 1895, he was prominent in the initiative to municipalise the city's technical college in 1898 and afterwards played a major role in reorganising it on "a thoroughly practical basis". He served as Chairman of Bradford Council's Technical Instruction Committee and of the more comprehensive Education Committee which replaced it under the Education Act 1902. Described as "intensely in earnest regarding uplifting of people through the medium of better opportunities of education", he made several tours of continental Europe and the United States to study different instruction systems at his own expense. (Note: He argued in favour of raising the school leaving-age to fourteen and adopting day-release schemes to facilitate continued technical education. His most particular concern was the advancement of technical instruction to a standard comparable with that in Germany, and in 1902 he visited colleges in Cologne, Berlin, Leipzig, Dresden, Vienna, Budapest, Munich, Nuremberg, Stuttgart and Frankfurt, on return setting out a full account of his observations and recommendations. He wanted to see technical education reach beyond promoting mechanical improvement and "go to the secrets of nature by fundamental research". In the latter respect he admired the work being undertaken at Leeds University, where he was a Member of the University's Court from 1904 and a Life Member by 1920.)

Having unsuccessfully contested the Bradford East Parliamentary seat at the 1900 General Election, he was elected an Alderman of Bradford in 1903 and its Mayor for 1904–5. Local economic depression had resulted in increased demands on Bradford's Cinderella Club, a charitable organisation with which Priestley had been associated since the 1890s and which provided free food, clothing and amusement for the city's poor children. In the winter of 1903-4 the club served more than 110,000 free meals and, by the time of Priestley's accession as mayor, its funds were approaching exhaustion.

At a heated meeting chaired by Priestley in November 1904, it was agreed that Bradford Council would assume responsibility for funding the club's provision of meals. The means by which this responsibility was to be discharged were ill-defined, but the commitment was the first of its kind by an English local authority. Alderman Fred Jowett argued that the cost should be a charge on the rates and in the first instance, to overcome legal difficulties, be paid from a salary to be voted to Priestley as mayor. Unhappy with this approach, Priestley launched an appeal for voluntary funding that raised more than £3,000 in donations. Between November 1904 and October 1905, 350,000 free meals were served to Bradford children.

During his mayoralty, Priestley laid the foundation stone of Bradford's Town Hall extension, and his term of office was considered so successful that in November 1905 the Liberal and Conservative groups on the council united in asking him to serve for a further year. He declined the invitation and two months later was returned as MP for Bradford East at the election which swept the Liberal Party to power. He held the seat until his defeat at the 1918 general election.

Legislation introduced by the new government included the Education (Provision of Meals) Act 1906, establishing the national system of free school meals. The Act was strongly influenced by the Bradford experience and, when supporting it in Parliamentary debate, Fred Jowett (newly returned as Independent Labour MP for Bradford West) emphasised the need for secure funding of the meals system, dismissing the £3,000 raised by Priestley's appeal as "not voluntarily subscribed for its own sake" but payment by the well-to-do to fend off the "bogey" of municipal welfare.

== Parliamentary career ==
Priestley's 1906 majority in his Bradford constituency was 1,108. He increased it to 2,695 in January 1910 and to 3,044 in December 1910 but, following the national split in the Liberal Party, he lost heavily to the Coalition candidate in the coupon election of 1918.

His contributions from the floor of the House of Commons were slight, but he was active in lobbying ministers on trade issues and deserves credit for the Registration of Business Names Act 1916, which required registration of the ownership of each business operating under a name other than that of its proprietor(s). The measure was introduced by him as a private member's bill in 1914, and he successfully persuaded the Board of Trade to allow it a sympathetic passage.

He was ready to speak forcefully on a topic when the occasion required. Thus, in 1917, after the War Office commandeered the nation's entire wool supply, it was reported that “in terse and telling phrases he arraigned the official ‘amateurs’ on the score of their ignorance and bungling”, (Note: Hansard (House of Commons Debate, 15 February 1917 ) records him speaking in more temperate terms, but he was certainly a powerful public speaker and could turn a good phrase. Denouncing the House of Lords’ rejection of Lloyd George's 1909 budget, he declared, “If the people of this country permit their liberties to be filched from them by six hundred irresponsible Peers, their children will rise up and curse them.” In opposition to the hereditary principle he observed that, when granting independence to her former colonies, Britain had never once contemplated a constitutional settlement that included an unelected Second Chamber.) and he was shortly afterwards co-opted to the Central Wool Advisory Committee.

He sat on the House of Commons Local Legislation Committee and in 1917 was appointed to the Committee on Commercial and Industrial Policy, then considering adoption of the metric system.

He was outspoken in his opposition to women's suffrage, and both he and his wife were members of the deputation, led by Lord Curzon on behalf of the National League for Opposing Woman Suffrage, which sought assurances from Prime Minister Asquith that no women's suffrage measure would be introduced except after a clear expression of support from the nation. (Note: In 1910 he indicated a readiness to review such opposition if proposals for universal adult suffrage were brought forward, but in 1918 he was one of the small minority voting against the Representation of the People Bill.)

He was a member of the Executive of the National Liberal Federation, 1901–03, and of the committee of the Reform Club, was elected President of the national Museums Association in 1902, and was created a knight bachelor in the Birthday Honours of 1909.

== Wartime initiatives ==
In 1914 Priestley led the delegation to obtain Field Marshal Kitchener's authorisation for forming the Bradford Citizens’ Army League that raised the ill-fated Bradford Pals’ battalions of the West Yorkshire Regiment. (Note: On 1 July 1916, in the first hour of the Battle of the Somme, some 1,400 Bradford Pals advanced into No Man's Land to attack the German front line at Serre-lès-Puisieux. Well over a thousand of them were killed or injured in the fruitless assault.) He gave £1,000 to the League on formation and, pending issue of military uniforms, provided volunteers with handsome enamel badges to signify their enlistment. He chaired the committee supporting the Bradford War Fund, paid a weekly allowance to the families of Priestleys’ employees who enlisted and, for ten years following the war, continued the allowance to dependants of those of them killed on active service.

== Commercial endeavour ==
It was as a champion of free trade that Priestley stood for national political office, reflecting the dependency of both his constituency and his business on unhindered access to export markets. (Note: He calculated that of every five pieces of cloth produced in Bradford, four were directly or indirectly exported. In support of his firm's Canadian business, twenty-two travelling salesmen were based there in 1906 and, when the Duke of Kent called at the Laisterdyke warehouse in 1931, he was shown materials exported to each of the countries visited on his recent tour of South America and assured that Priestleys’ salesmen there were fluent in Spanish and Portuguese. Priestley himself was “for many years an indefatigable traveller for his business and on behalf of the trade organisations connected with the industry”.) In trade he recognised the importance of responding promptly to changes in customer taste and of ensuring that advances in product and process compensated for what he saw as inevitable increases in British labour rates. The scale of economic demand in the 20th century presented, he said, challenges which individualism struggled to meet and which required effective combinations of resource and ideas and of capital and labour. (Note: In the 1890s and early 1900s his firm combined with Courtaulds in marketing and distribution arrangements for their complementary products. In 1928 he was still speaking publicly in support of business cooperation, praising the Conservative government's collective marketing proposals for agricultural products, and his dictum on the need for customer focus (“Today we have to make what the world wants and not what we care to give them”) was widely quoted in the British press.)

His personal knowledge of textile manufacturing technique and markets was comprehensive: he was the inventor of several improvements in production processes, involved himself in all departments of his business, travelled extensively in pursuit of export opportunities and better supply arrangements (the firm's wool was largely sourced from Australia) and was an accomplished promoter of Priestleys’ products. (Note: Priestleys provided the dress material worn by the Princess of Wales when she opened the Bradford Exhibition of 1904. The firm was a principal exhibitor in the Exhibition's textile section, organised by the Bradford Textile Society of which William Priestley was then President, and was one of the few Bradford manufacturers still making its own looms. Its chief mechanic produced a nickel-plated model loom that was presented to the Princess during the Exhibition and subsequently installed at Marlborough House for the instruction of the royal children. When, as Queen, the Princess returned to Bradford and visited Priestleys’ mills in 1918, Priestley was able to show her the same cloth from which her dress has been made fourteen years earlier.) He believed the long-term success of a business involved “building up a strong and wealthy community”, and was reported to have good rapport with and respect among his workforce.

He was a key figure in the formation of the Textile Institute in 1910, contributed substantially to its Foundation Fund, succeeded Lord Rotherham as its President in 1913, and was made a Fellow of the Institute in 1927. He was senior Vice-President of the Bradford Chamber of Commerce and, in 1916, was elected an Honorary Secretary of the Association of Chambers of Commerce of Great Britain.

== The Priestley Cup ==
In 1904, the year following its formation, the Bradford Cricket League introduced a series of limited-overs matches in which member clubs competed annually for a silver trophy donated by Priestley, who was the League's President. The competition, intended to raise income for local charities from gate-money, quickly became popular: 5,000 attended its final in 1904, 10,000 in 1913, and 13,300 in 1918 (when the Leeds Mercury described it as “the chief event of the wartime cricket season in Yorkshire” and suggested the competition had become “perhaps the most popular in the country”). In 1913 the League introduced a parallel competition in which the clubs’ second teams played for a silver shield, again donated by Priestley. The expense of organising matches consumed an increasing proportion of gate-receipts, but by 1929 more than £8,000 had been donated to charity. The Priestley Cup and Priestley Shield continue to be played for, and competition matches have produced many memorable moments including notable performances by nationally famous players. (Note: Among such events were the celebrated bowler Sydney Barnes's unexpected innings of 168 for Saltaire in the Priestley semi-final of 1918 and his more predictable tally of 9 wickets for 8 runs against Low Moor in 1922. Priestley's association with the Bradford Cricket League continued until his death, when the League lamented the loss of “one of its best allies and most loyal supporters” who had contributed “sagacity, business ability and generosity” to its affairs.)

Priestley also donated silver trophies for local association football, rugby and golf competitions and for award at athletics events, produce and livestock shows. All were known as Priestley Cups or Shields.

== Other charitable interests ==
He was a Trustee of Bradford Royal Infirmary (he gave £5,000 to its building fund), of the Bradford Tradesmen's Home (a complex of almshouses in Manningham), and of other local benevolent institutions. He subscribed the funds enabling the Cinderella Club to provide day-excursions for poor widows and entertainments for large numbers of disadvantaged children and, together with his wife, took a particular interest in the children's holiday home established by the Club at Hest Bank, Morecambe, which he opened in 1905. (Note: Both Priestley and his wife had previously been associated with the management of Bradford Children's Hospital. In Morecambe he was remembered as “one of the most generous gentlemen Bradford ever had”. By his will he left £1,000 for the further development of Hest Bank, where children selected from Bradford's poor were given two weeks’ summer holiday and from which, it was said, every child returned to Bradford four pounds heavier.) He was President of the Club from 1918 until his death.

He was Patron of the Morecambe branch of the Royal National Lifeboat Institution, Chairman of the Institution's Bradford Branch (Note: He was Chairman of the branch for more than twenty years, during which period Bradford annually raised more funds for the RNLI per head of population than any other place in the north of England. In 1929 Priestley accepted on behalf of the Institution City of Bradford II, the new Humber-based lifeboat which had largely been paid for by Bradford fund-raising. He believed there was “no nobler work in England than that of the Lifeboat Institution”.) and a national Vice-President of the Institution. In 1933, to commemorate what would have been their silver wedding anniversary, his widow had a lifeboat designed and built for the Morecambe and Heysham Fishermen's Association; watched by a crowd of 20,000, she launched the vessel in the following year, naming it the Sir William Priestley. (Note: The vessel, built with a shallow draught to the specification of local trawlermen, was retired from service in 1987. Several glass-fibre replicas were made from moulds of the hull.)

== Family, personal life and death ==
In 1883 Priestley married Ruth Craven, fourth of the six daughters of Joseph Craven of Thornton, MP for Shipley. Described as her husband's “alter ego”, she came “from a thoroughbred race of hard-headed people” and was “an ardent Liberal of great intelligence”.

Regularly sharing the political platform with her husband, Ruth Priestley was a confident public speaker and held office in several Bradford societies. (Note: She was variously described as “silver-tongued” and as speaking “gracefully, effectively and above all things naturally”. She could, however, be blunt: on Priestley informing her that he was to be knighted, she remarked “What nonsense”. She regretted his entry into politics at the national level, later observing that “he had been doing splendid work in Bradford and in politics he was a mere unit”.) The couple, who had two daughters, lived principally at Rosemount House, in Manningham, where during the war years Lady Priestley and a team of helpers ran a hospital supply depot that produced over 250,000 articles (dressing-gowns, pyjamas, surgical bandages, swabs and operation stockings) from fabric donated by Priestley.

In 1905 Priestley bought the 1,900-acre Littledale Hall estate, in the Forest of Bowland, on 200 acres of which he ran an experimental farm. He was described as a superior shot, a brilliant billiards player and a very moderate golfer, and was said, like Gladstone, to enjoy chopping down a tree.

He was a Council member and Vice-President of the Bronte Society - to which he lent his collection of Charlotte's pencil drawings and watercolours, together with letters written by her and her father, all exhibited at the opening of the Society's first museum at Haworth in 1895. (Note: The Society had not yet acquired the Parsonage, the contents of which now include a portrait of Lady Priestley's uncle, Henry Foster of Denholme, reputedly the work of Branwell Bronte.) William Scruton's Thornton and the Brontes was dedicated to Priestley, who sent copies of the volume to every member of the Society as a Christmas gift in 1898. His library at Rosemount included several volumes inscribed by Patrick Bronte, as well as important first editions. (Note: Four hundred volumes from the library were auctioned by Sotheby's in 1932, including nearly thirty Dickens firsts, among them The Battle of Life (1846) for which Maggs Bros Ltd paid £260.)

He died at Rosemount on 25 March 1932. Following cremation his ashes were scattered on his Littledale estate. His coat of arms is displayed in the oriel window of the Banqueting Hall of Bradford City Hall. His widow lived at Rosemount until her death, aged 98, in 1954. (Note: After her death, Rosemount House was bought by Bradford Corporation to be used for further educational purposes. The property was demolished and the site redeveloped in 2015.)

== Notes ==
Parliament of the United Kingdom
Preceded by Ronald Henry Fulke Greville	Member of Parliament for Bradford East; 1906 – 1918	Succeeded by Charles Edgar Loseby
