= Albert Braithwaite =

British politician

Albert Braithwaite DSO MC MP

Member of Parliament for Harrow West
- In office 21 April 1951 – 20 October 1959
- Preceded by: Guy Gaunt
- Succeeded by: George Wadsworth

Member of Parliament for Buckrose
- In office 5 May 1926 – 15 June 1945
- Preceded by: Norman Bower
- Succeeded by: John Page

Personal details
- Born: 2 September 1893 Horsforth, Yorkshire, United Kingdom
- Died: 20 October 1959 (aged 66)
- Party: Conservative
- Education: University of Leeds

Military service
- Allegiance: United Kingdom
- Branch/service: Army
- Battles/wars: World War I

Sir Albert Newby Braithwaite DSO MC MP (2 September 1893 – 20 October 1959) was a British Conservative Party politician. He was the son of Albert Braithwaite, one time Lord Mayor of Leeds, and Patti Braithwaite.

He was born in Horsforth, Yorkshire, and educated at Woodhouse Grove School, Leeds Grammar School and the University of Leeds. He served in the Yorkshire Hussars during World War I and was appointed a member of the British Military Commission to the United States. He was awarded a DSO in 1918.

He was elected as Member of Parliament for the Buckrose constituency in the East Riding of Yorkshire at a by-election in 1926, following the resignation of the Conservative MP Guy Gaunt. He held the seat until the 1945 general election, when the Labour Party did not contest the seat and he was defeated by the Liberal Party candidate George Wadsworth. He was knighted in that year and was director of a number of companies.

Braithwaite returned to the House of Commons at a by-election in 1951, as MP for Harrow West, succeeding the Conservative Norman Bower, who had resigned. He held the seat until his death by suicide in 1959, weeks after retaining the seat in that year's general election.

Parliament of the United Kingdom
Preceded by Sir Guy Gaunt	Member of Parliament for Buckrose; 1926 – 1945	Succeeded by George Wadsworth
Preceded by Norman Bower	Member of Parliament for Harrow West; 1951 – 1959	Succeeded by John Page
