= Guy Gaunt =

Australian-British navy officer and politician

Admiral Sir Guy Gaunt KCMG CB
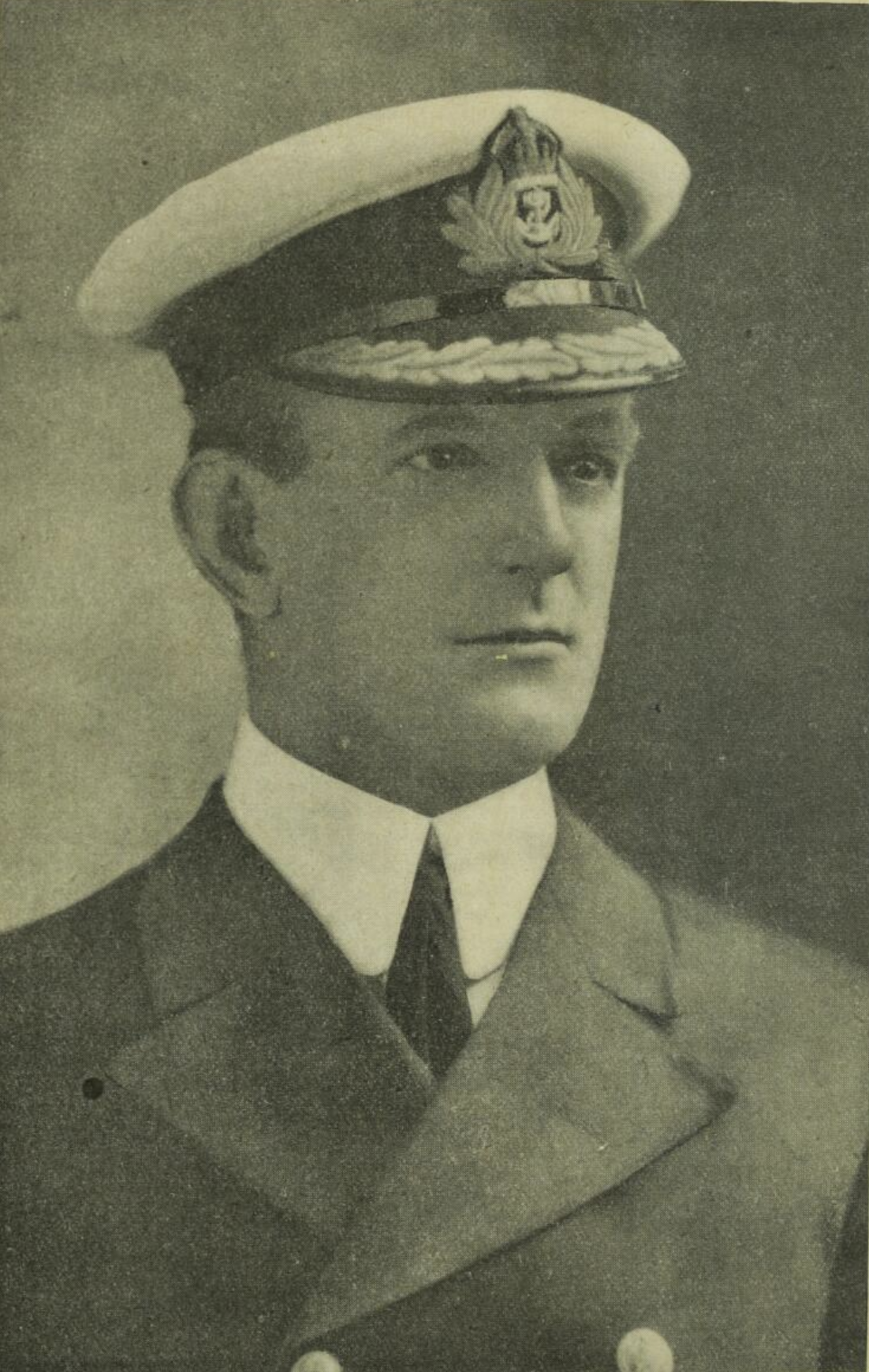
- Gaunt in 1912
- Born: 25 May 1869; Ballarat, Australia
- Died: 18 May 1953 (aged 83); Woking, Surrey, England
- Known for: Admiral
- Political party: Conservative
- Spouses: Margaret Elizabeth Worthington (m. 1904; div. 1927) Sybil Victoria Joseph (m. 1935)
- Children: 2 daughters from second marriage
- Parent(s): William Henry Gaunt and his wife Elizabeth Mary
- Relatives: Ernest Gaunt; Mary Elizabeth Bakewell Gaunt
- Awards: KCMG CB

Admiral Sir Guy Reginald Archer Gaunt, KCMG, CB (25 May 1869 – 18 May 1953) was an Australian-born officer of the Royal Navy, counter-intelligence officer and a British Conservative Party politician.

Gaunt was born in Ballarat, Australia, to William Henry Gaunt and his wife Elizabeth Mary Palmer. Gaunt's brother-in-law was Alexander Stenson Palmer (banker and M.P. for Victoria). Gaunt's brother Ernest Gaunt was also an admiral. Their sister, Mary Gaunt, was a well-known author in Australia and wrote several travel books. Guy was educated at Melbourne Grammar School from 1881 to 1883.

== Naval career ==
Gaunt's parents wanted him to become a lawyer, but he chose to go to sea. He began training for the merchant navy, but transferred to the Royal Navy in 1885, one of the "hungry hundred" merchant navy officers who were commissioned via the supplementary list.

Gaunt served as a lieutenant on several vessels in the Pacific Ocean and saw action in the Philippines in 1897 and Samoa in 1901. He was promoted to the rank of Commander in 1901, and was posted to the protected cruiser HMS Spartiate on her commission in March 1903. He became a captain on 30 June 1907, commanding a series of cruisers and the battleships HMS Majestic and HMS Thunderer.

In 1914 Gaunt was appointed naval attaché to the United States, and was instrumental in infiltrating the Hindu–German Conspiracy during the First World War. Gaunt headed the intelligence network operated by Courtenay Bennett's intelligence and liaised with the Czech intelligence network operated by E. V. Voska. On learning of the plot from the Czech European network at the outbreak of the war, Voska passed on the information to Gaunt and to Tomáš Masaryk who further passed on the information the American authorities. Voska's American network was a counter-espionage network of nearly 80 members who, as Habsburg subjects, were presumed to be German supporters but were involved in spying on German and Austrian diplomats.

When the U.S. entered the war in 1917, Gaunt was appointed as liaison officer. In 1918 he served on convoys across the Atlantic and in June was appointed to the naval intelligence staff at the Admiralty.

Gaunt was promoted on the retired list to rear admiral in October 1918, vice admiral in July 1924 and admiral in February 1928. He was knighted as KCMG in 1918.

== Political career ==
Gaunt first stood as a candidate for parliament at the 1918 general election. He was the Liberal candidate for Leek and despite receiving the Coalition Coupon, he was unable to hold the seat. Gaunt was elected as Unionist Member of Parliament (MP) for the Buckrose constituency in the East Riding of Yorkshire at the 1922 general election, replacing the Liberal Algernon Moreing.

Gaunt resigned from the House of Commons in 1926, when he was cited as co-respondent in the divorce case between Sir Richard Cruise and his wife.

== Family ==
Gaunt married a widow, Mrs Margaret Elizabeth Worthington (daughter of Sir Thomas Wardle) at Hong Kong in 1904. She divorced him in 1927 following the scandal with Lady Cruise, and he retired to Tangier. He later remarried on 1 December 1932 a 35-year-old widow, Sybil Victoria Joseph, née Grant White and had two daughters. He returned to live in Cobham, Surrey and died at Woking Hospital on 18 May 1953 and was cremated.

Gaunt's autobiography, The Yield of the Years, was published in 1940. His brother Ernest Gaunt was also an admiral in the Royal Navy; his sister, Mary Gaunt, was a novelist.

== Bibliography ==
- Bose, A. C. (1971), Indian Revolutionaries Abroad, 1905-1927, Patna:Bharati Bhawan., ISBN 81-7211-123-1.
- Masaryk, T. (1970), Making of a State, Howard Fertig, ISBN 0-685-09575-4.
- Popplewell, Richard J. (1995), Intelligence and Imperial Defence: British Intelligence and the Defence of the Indian Empire 1904-1924., Routledge, ISBN 0-7146-4580-X, archived from the original on 26 March 2009.
- Voska, E. V.; Irwin, W. (1940), Spy and Counterspy, New York. Doubleday, Doran & Co.

Parliament of the United Kingdom
Preceded by Algernon Moreing	Member of Parliament for Buckrose; 1922–1926	Succeeded by Albert Braithwaite
