= 1926 Buckrose by-election =

UK parliamentary by-election

← 1924	5 May 1926	1929 →

Candidate	Albert Braithwaite	Sir Harry Verney	H.C. Laycock
Party	Unionist	Liberal	Labour
Popular vote	12,098	10,537	2,191
Percentage	48.7%	42.5%	8.8%
MP before election
Sir Guy Gaunt
Unionist
Subsequent MP
Albert Braithwaite
Unionist

The 1926 Buckrose by-election was a parliamentary by-election for the British House of Commons constituency of Buckrose, Yorkshire on 5 May 1926. This was the first by-election to take place during the General Strike.

== Vacancy ==
The by-election was caused by the resignation of the sitting Unionist MP, Sir Guy Gaunt on 20 February 1926. He was cited as co-respondent in the divorce case between Sir Richard Cruise and his wife. He had been MP here since winning the seat in 1922.

== Election history ==
The constituency was created in 1885 and had been in the hands of the Liberal Party for most of the time before the Unionists won in 1922. A Labour candidate had only ever stood here once before, in 1918. The result at the last General Election was:

General election 1924: Buckrose
Party	Candidate	Votes	%	±%
Unionist	Guy Gaunt	13,966	56.0	+5.6
Liberal	Harry Briggs	10,962	44.0	−5.6
Majority		3,004	12.0	+11.2
Turnout		24,958	82.9	−1.2
Unionist hold		Swing	+5.6	

== Candidates ==
- On 12 April, the Buckrose Unionist Association chose 33-year-old Albert Braithwaite DSO, MC as their candidate to defend the seat. He was the son of Albert Braithwaite, one time Lord Mayor of Leeds and Patti Braithwaite. He was educated at Woodhouse Grove School, Leeds Grammar School and the University of Leeds. He served in the Yorkshire Hussars during World War I and was appointed a member of the British Military Commission to the USA. He was awarded a DSO in 1918.
- The Buckrose Liberal Association adopted 45-year-old Sir Harry Verney as their candidate to challenge for the seat. Verney succeeded in the baronetcy in May 1910. In the December general election of the same year he was returned to Parliament for Buckingham, a seat he held until 1918. He served under H. H. Asquith as Parliamentary Secretary to the Board of Agriculture and Fisheries from 1914 to 1915. Verney married Rachel Gwenyfyr Catherine, daughter of Victor Alexander Bruce, 13th Earl of Kincardine, in 1911. After his defeat at Buckingham in 1918, Verney had made a number of attempts to re-enter parliament. He stood as Liberal candidate in the 1920 Basingstoke by-election, he stood as Liberal candidate for Skipton at the 1922 and 1923 general elections and Banbury at the last election in 1924.
- The Buckrose Constituency Labour Party had selected Lt. Herbert Cecil Laycock MC as their prospective candidate back in February 1926. He came from Burnley and lived in Leeds. He was standing for parliament for the first time.

== Campaign ==
Nominations closed on 27 April. Polling Day was set for 5 May 1926.

== Result ==
The Unionists hung onto the seat by a reduced margin;

1926 Buckrose by-election
Party	Candidate	Votes	%	±%
Unionist	Albert Braithwaite	12,098	48.7	−7.3
Liberal	Harry Verney	10,537	42.5	−1.5
Labour	Herbert Cecil Laycock	2,191	8.8	New
Majority		1,552	6.2	−5.8
Turnout		24,826	81.7	−1.2
Unionist hold		Swing	-2.9	

== Aftermath ==
Braithwaite retained the seat at the following General Election;

General election 1929: Buckrose
Party	Candidate	Votes	%	±%
Unionist	Albert Braithwaite	15,625	50.0	+1.3
Liberal	Sidney Streatfield Leigh Lamert	13,825	44.4	+1.9
Labour	Harold H Vickers	1,766	5.6	−3.2
Majority		1,800	5.6	−0.6
Turnout		31,216	80.4	−1.3
Unionist hold		Swing	-0.3	

Neither Verney not Laycock stood for parliament again.

== See also ==
- Lists of United Kingdom by-elections
- United Kingdom by-election records
