= Charles Edgar Loseby =

British politician

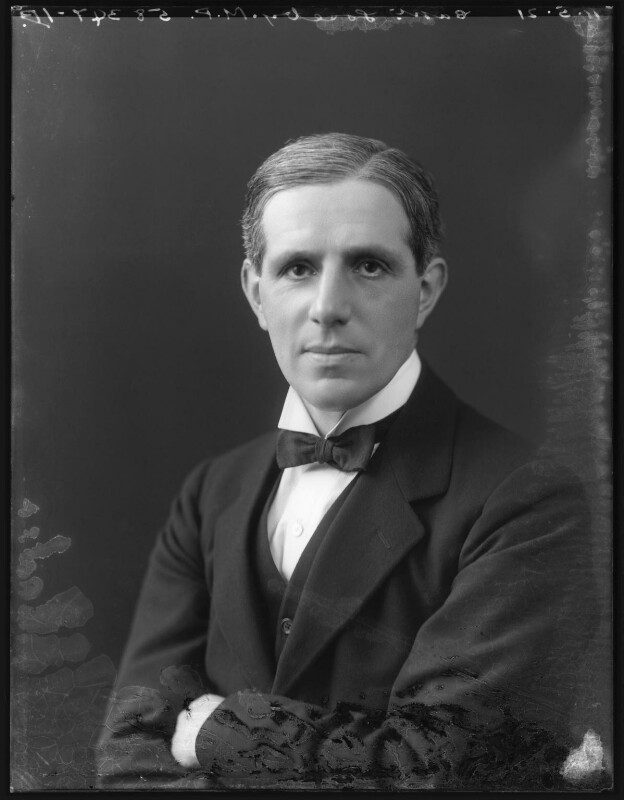
Charles Loseby

Charles Edgar Loseby MC (1 May 1881 – 7 January 1970) was a British schoolmaster, lawyer, and politician, serving as Member of Parliament for Bradford East.

Before the First World War, he was a teacher at St Cyprian's School, Eastbourne, and in 1912 he taught at Winchester House School in Deal, Kent. He joined the army in September 1914 and went to serve in France. He was gassed at Ypres in May 1915.

In 1917, he won the Military Cross for actions at the Battle of Cambrai.

At the 1918 general election, he was elected as Coalition National Democratic and Labour Party member for Bradford East and served in the House of Commons until the 1922 general election, which he fought unsuccessfully for David Lloyd George's new National Liberal Party.

After the Coalition government ended, Loseby remained an advocate of close co-operation between the Liberal and Conservative parties; He was a supporter of Winston Churchill and like Churchill contested the 1924 General election as a Constitutionalist at Nottingham West. He was unsuccessful at the election and before the 1929 General election had joined the Conservatives, standing as a candidate for them in 1929.

Loseby later lived in Hong Kong, where in 1949 he was the first chairman of the Reform Club of Hong Kong, which was founded to campaign for direct elections to the Legislative Council of Hong Kong, and also became chairman of the Hong Kong Bar Association.

In 1921, at St George's, Hanover Square, Loseby married Dulcibella Jeanette Herne (1895–1971). Their daughter Diana was born in Kensington in 1922.

By the time of his death in 1970, Loseby had retired to Saint Martin, Guernsey, where he was buried in the St Martin's New Cemetery.

Parliament of the United Kingdom
Preceded by William Priestley	Member of Parliament for Bradford East; 1918–1922	Succeeded by Fred Jowett
