= Holden baronets =

Set index for Holden baronets

There have been three baronetcies created for persons with the surname Holden, all in the Baronetage of the United Kingdom. As of 2026 two of the creations are extant..

- Holden baronets of Oakworth House (1893)
- Holden baronets of the Grange (1909)
- Holden baronets of The Firs (1919)
