= Luke White (English politician) =

British politician

Luke White MP, circa 1900s

Sir Luke White (1845 – 17 August 1920) was an English Liberal Party politician.

== Early life ==
White was born at Deighton, Yorkshire. He was a solicitor by profession, served as justice of the peace and was from 1897 Coroner for the East Riding of Yorkshire.

== Liberal agent ==
In the 1886 general election he was agent to the Liberal candidate for the Buckrose constituency in the east of Yorkshire, William Alexander McArthur. At that election, McArthur was declared the victor over his Conservative opponent Christopher Sykes by a single vote, 3,742 to 3,741. McArthur and took his seat, but "on scrutiny" the seat was eventually awarded to Sykes.

== Liberal MP ==
In 1899, the sitting member of parliament (MP) for Buckrose Sir Angus Holden announced he was standing down from politics at the next election and White was adopted by the Buckrose Liberal Council to succeed him. At the time of his adoption White was Chairman of Driffield Urban Council and had previously been an Alderman of the East Riding County Council. He was elected as MP for Buckrose at the General Election of 1900, albeit by the modest margin of 90 votes. At the 1906 general election he increased his majority to 1,602 votes. Political times had become tougher by 1910 however and at the January 1910 general election White's majority dropped to 218. He held on in December 1910 too. During 1918 White's health began to worsen and as a result in July of that year he announced he would not be seeking re-election at the 1918 general election. White was knighted in November 1908.

== Bankruptcy ==
White's standing down because of ill-health may however have been a touch diplomatic for after the general election it emerged that White was in serious financial difficulty with debts of more than £21,000 much of which had apparently been run up in election expenses. White was called to appear before the Scarborough Bankruptcy Court but failed to attend citing his poor health. A warrant for his arrest on fraud charges, jointly with a local solicitor, Herbert Brown described in the press as White's clerk, was later issued but the court was told that White's physical and mental health would not allow him to be moved and the warrant was suspended. After a six-day hearing Brown was acquitted of the charges in June 1919. White died in 1920.

Parliament of the United Kingdom
Preceded by Sir Angus Holden	Member of Parliament for Buckrose; 1900 – 1918	Succeeded by Algernon Moreing
