= Holden baronets of The Firs (1919) =

Escutcheon of the Holden baronets of The Firs

The Holden baronetcy, of The Firs in Leigh, in the County of Lancaster, was created in the Baronetage of the United Kingdom in 1919 for John Holden, a cotton spinner, twice Mayor of Leigh. The 2nd Baronet was also an industrialist and Mayor of Leigh, from 1920 to 1922.

== Holden baronets, of The Firs (1919) ==
- Sir John Henry Holden, 1st Baronet (1862–1926)
- Sir George Holden, 2nd Baronet (1890–1937)
- Sir George Holden, 3rd Baronet (1914–1976) Burke in 1949 gave his residence as Togher House, Monasterevin in Ireland; later he was in Dorking.
- Sir John David Holden, 4th Baronet (born 1967)

The heir presumptive is the present holder's uncle Brian Peter John Holden (born 1944).

== Extended family ==
The writer Anthony Holden (1947–2023) was a grandson of the 2nd Baronet. He wrote of his uncle the 3rd Baronet that he was "a commercial traveller, reduced to living in a caravan on a farmyard in Yorkshire."
