= Bradford East =

UK Parliament constituency (1885–1974, 2010 onwards)

Coordinates: 53.82°N 1.73°W

- Borough constituency for the House of Commons
- Boundaries since 2024
- Boundary of Bradford East in Yorkshire and the Humber
- County: West Yorkshire
- Population: 113,820 (2011 census)
- Electorate: 74,205 (December 2019)
- Major settlements: Bradford

Current constituency
- Created: 2010
- Member of Parliament: Imran Hussain (Labour)
- Seats: One
- Created from: Bradford North

1885–1974
- Seats: One
- Type of constituency: Borough constituency
- Created from: Bradford
- Replaced by: Bradford North

Bradford East is a constituency in West Yorkshire represented in the House of Commons of the UK Parliament since 2015 by Imran Hussain of the Labour Party.

== Constituency profile ==
The Bradford East constituency is located in the City of Bradford metropolitan borough in the county of West Yorkshire. It is almost entirely urban or suburban and covers areas to the east and north-east of Bradford city centre. It includes the neighbourhoods of Bolton and Undercliffe, Little Horton, Barkerend and Idle. The area has an industrial heritage; Bradford was once a global centre for textile manufacturing, particularly in the wool trade. Like much of post-industrial Northern England, Bradford has experienced economic decline with the decrease in importance of the textile industry. The parts of the constituency near the city centre are in the 10% most deprived areas of the country, whilst the suburbs to the north around Idle are wealthier.

In 1966, 11.9% of the constituency was born in the New Commonwealth.

Compared to national averages, residents of the constituency are young and have high levels of deprivation. House prices and levels of education and professional employment are very low. Like the rest of Bradford, the constituency has a large Pakistani community, who make up 36% of the population. Overall, White and Asian people each make up 46% of residents, although the constituency is divided; Asians make up around 80% of the population in Barkerend but there are very few Asian residents in Idle and Thackley. Local politics at the district council are mixed; the areas close to the city centre are represented by Labour Party and independent councillors whilst Liberal Democrats represent the wealthier northern suburbs. An estimated 55% of voters in the constituency supported leaving the European Union in the 2016 referendum, slightly higher than the national figure of 52%.

== History ==
The constituency had existed from 1885 to 1974. Following a 2007–2009 review of parliamentary boundaries in West Yorkshire by the Boundary Commission for England, the Bradford North constituency was abolished and Bradford East created for the 2010 general election.

== Boundaries ==
=== Municipal boundaries of Bradford ===
Bradford was incorporated as a municipal borough in 1847, covering the parishes of Bradford, Horton and Manningham. It became a county borough with the passing of the Local Government Act 1888. The county borough was granted city status by Letters Patent in 1897. Bradford was expanded in 1882 to include Allerton, Bolton and Undercliffe, Bowling, Heaton, Thornbury and Tyersal. In 1899 it was further expanded by adding North Bierley, Eccleshill, Idle, Thornton, Tong and Wyke. Clayton was added in 1930.

From 1974, the county borough was merged with the Borough of Keighley, the Urban Districts of Baildon, Bingley, Denholme, Cullingworth, Ilkley, Shipley and Silsden, along with part of Queensbury and Shelf Urban District and part of Skipton Rural District to create the Metropolitan Borough of Bradford.

=== Parliamentary boundaries ===
1885–1918: The Municipal Borough of Bradford, in the West Riding of Yorkshire, was divided into three single-member constituencies from the 1885 general election. Bradford East was the eastern third of Bradford and was approximately rectangular in shape. It consisted of the wards of Bradford Moor, East, East Bowling, South, and West Bowling. It bordered Pudsey to the east, Elland in the south, Bradford Central to the west and Shipley in the north.

1918–1950: The Municipal Borough of Bradford wards of Bradford Moor, East Bowling, Tong, and West Bowling. It was located in the south-east corner of the city of Bradford.

1950–1955: The constituency was expanded to the south-west, to include territory formerly in the Bradford South seat. The Bradford Moor area, in the north of the old East division, was transferred to Bradford Central. The wards allocated to the East division from 1950 were East Bowling, Little Horton, North Bierley East, Tong, and West Bowling.

1955–1974: The 1955 redistribution removed the western part of the old East division and expanded the seat north. North Bierley East and West Bowling wards were transferred to Bradford South. The East seat from 1955 comprised the wards of East Bowling, Exchange, Listerhills, Little Horton, South, and Tong.

In 1974 the Bradford East seat was abolished. The Bowling area became part of Bradford North; Tong joined Bradford South; and Little Horton became part of Bradford West.

2010-2024: Bradford East was recreated as the successor seat to Bradford North, which was created for the 1918 general election. The report into the boundary review says;

"5. The Assistant Commissioner reported that he was also called upon to consider alternative names submitted for Bradford East. He rejected a number of alternatives... as he considered they did not have any merit.... He also rejected the submissions that proposed that the name Bradford North should be retained...."

The wards in this new constituency were entirely within the Bradford city boundaries:

- Bolton and Undercliffe, Bowling and Barkerend, Bradford Moor, Eccleshill, Idle and Thackley and Little Horton

2024–present: As above, apart from the loss of a small part of the Bowling and Barkerend ward (polling district 5F) to Bradford South.

== Members of Parliament ==
=== MPs 1885–1974 ===
Election	Member	Party
1885	Sir Angus Holden, later Baron Holden	Liberal
1886	Henry Byron Reed	Conservative
1892	William Sproston Caine	Liberal
1895	Henry Byron Reed	Conservative
1896 by-election	Ronald Greville	Conservative
1906	William Priestley	Liberal
1918	Charles Edgar Loseby	Coalition National Democratic
1922	Fred Jowett	Labour
1924	Thomas Fenby	Liberal
1929	Fred Jowett	Labour
1931	Joseph Hepworth	Conservative
1945	Frank McLeavy	Labour
1966	Edward Lyons	Labour
Feb 1974	constituency abolished	

=== MPs since 2010 ===
Election	Member	Party
2010	David Ward	Liberal Democrats
Jul 2013	David Ward	Independent
Oct 2013	David Ward	Liberal Democrats
2015	Imran Hussain	Labour
2024	Imran Hussain	Independent
2025	Imran Hussain	Labour

== Elections ==
The original constituency had its first contest at the 1885 general election and its last at the 1970 general election.

=== Elections in the 2020s ===
General election 2024: Bradford East
Party	Candidate	Votes	%	±%
Labour	Imran Hussain	14,098	37.9	−25.1
Independent	Talat Sajawal	7,909	21.3	N/A
Reform	Jacob Anstey	4,952	13.3	+7.1
Conservative	Aubrey Holt	3,450	9.3	−12.4
Green	Celia Hickson	2,571	6.9	+5.4
Liberal Democrats	Robert St John O'Carroll	1,910	5.1	−2.6
Independent	Mohammed Rahman	817	2.2	N/A
Yorkshire	Lara Barras	761	2.0	N/A
Independent	Amer Rehman	683	1.8	N/A
SDP	Richard Riley	65	0.2	N/A
Majority		6,189	16.6	–24.7
Turnout		37,216	49.5	–10.1
Registered electors		75,167		
Labour hold				

=== Elections in the 2010s ===
2019 notional result
Party	Vote	%
Labour	27,105	63.0
Conservative	9,344	21.7
Liberal Democrats	3,302	7.7
Brexit Party	2,647	6.2
Green	638	1.5
Turnout	43,036	59.6
Electorate	72,150	

General election 2019: Bradford East
Party	Candidate	Votes	%	±%
Labour	Imran Hussain	27,825	63.0	−2.4
Conservative	Linden Kemkaran	9,681	21.9	+1.5
Liberal Democrats	Jeanette Sunderland	3,316	7.5	+5.7
Brexit Party	Jonathan Barras	2,700	6.1	New
Green	Andy Stanford	662	1.5	+0.9
Majority		18,144	41.1	−3.9
Turnout		44,184	60.4	−4.6
Labour hold		Swing		

General election 2017: Bradford East
Party	Candidate	Votes	%	±%
Labour	Imran Hussain	29,831	65.4	+18.8
Conservative	Mark Trafford	9,291	20.4	+9.1
Independent	David Ward	3,576	7.8	New
UKIP	Jonathan Barras	1,372	3.0	−6.9
Liberal Democrats	Mark Jewell	843	1.8	−27.7
Better for Bradford	Paul Parkins	420	0.9	New
Green	Andy Stanford	289	0.6	−1.5
Majority		20,540	45.0	+27.9
Turnout		45,622	64.8	+2.2
Labour hold		Swing	+4.8	

General election 2015: Bradford East
Party	Candidate	Votes	%	±%
Labour	Imran Hussain	19,312	46.6	+13.8
Liberal Democrats	David Ward	12,228	29.5	−4.2
Conservative	Iftikhar Ahmed	4,682	11.3	−15.5
UKIP	Owais Rajput	4,103	9.9	New
Green	David Stevens	871	2.1	New
British Democrats	James Lewthwaite	210	0.5	New
Majority		7,084	17.1	N/A
Turnout		41,406	62.6	+0.5
Labour gain from Liberal Democrats		Swing	+9.0	

General election 2010: Bradford East
Party	Candidate	Votes	%	±%
Liberal Democrats	David Ward	13,637	33.7	+3.9
Labour	Terry Rooney	13,272	32.8	−11.3
Conservative	Mohammed Riaz	10,860	26.8	+9.4
BNP	Neville Poynton	1,854	4.6	−1.0
Independent	Raja Hussain	375	0.9	New
Independent	Peter Shields	237	0.6	New
National Front	Gerry Robinson	222	0.5	New
Majority		365	0.9	N/A
Turnout		40,457	62.1	+8.0
Liberal Democrats gain from Labour		Swing	+7.6 (Note: Based on notional 2005 results by ward)	

=== Election in the 1970s ===
General election 1970: Bradford East
Party	Candidate	Votes	%	±%
Labour	Edward Lyons	17,346	66.17	
Conservative	Christopher J Barr	8,208	31.31	
Liberal	Ghulam Musa	660	2.52	New
Majority		9,138	34.86	
Turnout		26,214	64.75	
Labour hold		Swing		

=== Elections in the 1960s ===
General election 1966: Bradford East
Party	Candidate	Votes	%	±%
Labour	Edward Lyons	18,435	69.50	
National Liberal	Henry Sissling	8,091	30.50	
Majority		10,344	39.00	
Turnout		26,526	65.12	
Labour hold		Swing		

General election 1964: Bradford East
Party	Candidate	Votes	%	±%
Labour	Frank McLeavy	17,945	61.84	
National Liberal	D Trevor Lewis	11,075	38.16	
Majority		6,870	23.68	
Turnout		29,020	66.84	
Labour hold		Swing		

=== Elections in the 1950s ===
General election 1959: Bradford East
Party	Candidate	Votes	%	±%
Labour	Frank McLeavy	20,056	57.99	
National Liberal	Desmond A Dagleish	14,529	42.01	
Majority		5,527	15.98	
Turnout		34,585	72.79	
Labour hold		Swing		

General election 1955: Bradford East
Party	Candidate	Votes	%	±%
Labour	Frank McLeavy	23,588	61.59	
National Liberal	George C Barber	14,713	38.41	
Majority		8,875	23.18	
Turnout		38,301	74.44	
Labour hold		Swing		

General election 1951: Bradford East
Party	Candidate	Votes	%	±%
Labour	Frank McLeavy	28,796	62.88	
National Liberal	Frederick William Howard Cook	16,999	37.12	
Majority		11,797	25.76	
Turnout		45,795	84.28	
Labour hold		Swing		

General election 1950: Bradford East
Party	Candidate	Votes	%	±%
Labour	Frank McLeavy	27,694	59.8	+14.8
National Liberal	Geoffrey Francis Greenbank	12,527	27.0	+0.9
Liberal	Joseph Stanley Snowden	5,565	12.0	−2.3
Communist	H Green	543	1.2	New
Majority		15,167	32.8	+13.8
Turnout		46,329	84.6	+5.7
Labour hold		Swing		

=== Election in the 1940s ===
General election 1945: Bradford East Electorate 44,305
Party	Candidate	Votes	%	±%
Labour	Frank McLeavy	15,743	45.0	+23.3
Conservative	William Taylor	9,109	26.1	−6.9
Ind. Labour Party	Will Ballantine	5,195	14.6	−12.0
Liberal	Joseph Stanley Snowden	5,010	14.3	−4.4
Majority		6,634	19.0	N/A
Turnout		34,967	78.9	+5.9
Labour gain from Conservative		Swing		

=== Elections in the 1930s ===
General election 1935: Bradford East
Party	Candidate	Votes	%	±%
Conservative	Joseph Hepworth	11,131	32.98	
Ind. Labour Party	Fred Jowett	8,983	26.61	New
Labour	Wilfred Heywood	7,329	21.71	New
Liberal	Thomas Fenby	6,312	18.70	New
Majority		2,148	6.37	
Turnout		33,755	73.04	
Conservative hold		Swing		

General election 1931: Bradford East
Party	Candidate	Votes	%	±%
Conservative	Joseph Hepworth	22,532	58.81	
Ind. Labour Party	Fred Jowett	15,779	41.19	
Majority		6,753	17.62	N/A
Turnout		38,311	82.40	
Conservative gain from Labour		Swing		

=== Election in the 1920s ===
Fenby

General election 1929: Bradford East
Party	Candidate	Votes	%	±%
Labour	Fred Jowett	21,398	54.7	+4.8
Liberal	Thomas Fenby	17,701	45.3	−4.8
Majority		3,697	9.4	N/A
Turnout		39,099	83.4	+2.6
Registered electors		46,856		
Labour gain from Liberal		Swing	+4.8	

General election 1924: Bradford East
Party	Candidate	Votes	%	±%
Liberal	Thomas Fenby	15,240	50.1	+21.7
Labour	Fred Jowett	15,174	49.9	+1.8
Majority		66	0.2	N/A
Turnout		30,414	80.8	+5.2
Registered electors		37,658		
Liberal gain from Labour		Swing	+10.0	

General election 6 December 1923: Bradford East
Party	Candidate	Votes	%	±%
Labour	Fred Jowett	13,579	48.1	+2.7
Liberal	Eckersley Mitchell	8,017	28.4	+7.0
Unionist	James Clare	6,622	23.5	New
Majority		5,562	19.7	+7.5
Turnout		28,218	75.6	−5.8
Registered electors		37,323		
Labour hold		Swing	−2.2	

General election 6 December 1922: Bradford East
Party	Candidate	Votes	%	±%
Labour	Fred Jowett	13,573	45.4	+7.5
National Liberal	Charles Edgar Loseby	9,926	33.2	−7.9
Liberal	Harry Medforth Dawson	6,411	21.4	+0.4
Majority		3,647	12.2	N/A
Turnout		29,910	81.4	+19.0
Registered electors		36,758		
Labour gain from National Democratic		Swing	+7.7	

=== Elections in the 1910s ===
General election 1918: Bradford East
Party		Candidate	Votes	%	±%
C	National Democratic	Charles Edgar Loseby	9,390	41.1	New
	Labour	Fred Jowett	8,637	37.9	New
	Liberal	William Priestley	4,782	21.0	−41.2
Majority			753	3.2	N/A
Turnout			22,809	62.4	−16.4
Registered electors			36,580		
	National Democratic gain from Liberal		Swing		
C indicates candidate endorsed by the coalition government.

A General Election was due to take place by the end of 1915. By the summer of 1914, the following candidates had been adopted to contest that election. Due to the outbreak of war, the election never took place.

- British Socialist Party: John Stokes

General election December 1910: Bradford East
Party	Candidate	Votes	%	±%
Liberal	William Priestley	7,778	62.2	+8.9
Conservative	R.M.H.J. Mortimer	4,734	37.8	+3.1
Majority		3,044	24.4	+5.8
Turnout		12,512	78.8	−2.3
Registered electors		15,884		
Liberal hold		Swing	+2.9	

General election January 1910: Bradford East
Party	Candidate	Votes	%	±%
Liberal	William Priestley	7,709	53.3	+7.7
Conservative	J.H. Balfour-Browne	5,014	34.7	+3.1
Social Democratic Federation	Edward Hartley	1,740	12.0	−10.8
Majority		2,695	18.6	+4.6
Turnout		14,463	91.1	+1.6
Registered electors		15,884		
Liberal hold		Swing	+2.3	

=== Elections in the 1900s ===
William Priestley

General election 1906: Bradford East
Party	Candidate	Votes	%	±%
Liberal	William Priestley	6,185	45.6	−1.3
Conservative	Vincent Caillard	4,277	31.6	−20.6
Social Democratic Federation	Edward Hartley	3,090	22.8	New
Majority		1,908	14.0	N/A
Turnout		13,552	89.5	+6.7
Registered electors		15,136		
Liberal gain from Conservative		Swing	+9.7	

General election 1900: Bradford East
Party	Candidate	Votes	%	±%
Conservative	Ronald Greville	6,121	52.2	−1.0
Liberal	William Priestley	5,514	46.9	+0.1
Independent	J. Sheldon	111	0.9	New
Majority		607	5.3	−1.1
Turnout		11,746	82.8	−1.7
Registered electors		14,189		
Conservative hold		Swing	−0.6	

=== Elections in the 1890s ===
By-election, 1896: Bradford East
Party	Candidate	Votes	%	±%
Conservative	Ronald Greville	4,921	43.2	−10.0
Liberal	Alfred Billson	4,526	39.7	−7.1
Ind. Labour Party	Keir Hardie	1,953	17.1	New
Majority		395	3.5	−2.9
Turnout		11,400	86.6	+2.1
Registered electors		13,159		
Conservative hold		Swing	−1.5	

General election 1895: Bradford East
Party	Candidate	Votes	%	±%
Conservative	Henry Byron Reed	5,843	53.2	+4.1
Liberal	William Sproston Caine	5,139	46.8	−4.1
Majority		704	6.4	N/A
Turnout		10,982	84.5	−2.7
Registered electors		12,997		
Conservative gain from Liberal		Swing	+4.1	

General election 1892: Bradford East
Party	Candidate	Votes	%	±%
Liberal	William Sproston Caine	5,575	50.9	+2.6
Conservative	Henry Byron Reed	5,373	49.1	−2.6
Majority		202	1.8	N/A
Turnout		10,948	87.2	+6.9
Registered electors		12,556		
Liberal gain from Conservative		Swing	+2.6	

=== Elections in the 1880s ===
General election 1886: Bradford East
Party	Candidate	Votes	%	±%
Conservative	Henry Byron Reed	4,519	51.7	+3.6
Liberal	Angus Holden	4,223	48.3	−3.6
Majority		296	3.4	N/A
Turnout		8,742	80.3	−3.1
Registered electors		10,887		
Conservative gain from Liberal		Swing	+3.6	

Holden

General election 1885: Bradford East
Party	Candidate	Votes	%	±%
Liberal	Angus Holden	4,713	51.9	
Conservative	John Taylor	4,367	48.1	
Majority		346	3.8	
Turnout		9,080	83.4	
Registered electors		10,887		
Liberal win (new seat)				

== See also ==
- List of parliamentary constituencies in West Yorkshire
- List of parliamentary constituencies in the Yorkshire and the Humber (region)

== Sources ==
- Boundaries of Parliamentary Constituencies 1885–1972, compiled and edited by F.W.S. Craig (Parliamentary Reference Publications 1972)
- British Parliamentary Election Results 1885–1918, compiled and edited by F.W.S. Craig (The Macmillan Press 1974)
- Leigh Rayment's Historical List of MPs – Constituencies beginning with "B" (part 4)
