= Frank McLeavy, Baron McLeavy =

British politician (1899-1976)

Frank McLeavy, Baron McLeavy (1 January 1899 – 1 October 1976) was a British Labour Party politician.

McLeavy became a road passenger transport officer. He joined the Labour Party, serving on Cheshire County Council from 1938 until 1950, and as Mayor of Bebington from 1939 to 1941.

At the 1945 general election, he was elected as Member of Parliament for Bradford East, holding his seat until he retired from the House of Commons at the 1966 general election.

On 11 September 1967, he was made a life peer as Baron McLeavy, of the City of Bradford. He died in 1976, aged 77.

Parliament of the United Kingdom
Preceded by Joseph Hepworth	Member of Parliament for Bradford East; 1945–1966	Succeeded by Edward Lyons
