= Fred Jowett =

British politician (1864–1944)

The Right Honourable F. W. Jowett
- Portrait by Walter Stoneman, 1924

First Commissioner of Works
- In office 22 January 1924 – 3 November 1924
- Monarch: George V
- Prime Minister: Ramsay MacDonald
- Preceded by: Sir John Baird, Bt
- Succeeded by: The Viscount Peel

Member of Parliament for Bradford West
- In office 12 January 1906 – 14 December 1918
- Preceded by: Sir Ernest Flower
- Succeeded by: Constituency abolished

Member of Parliament for Bradford East
- In office 15 November 1922 – 29 October 1924
- Preceded by: Charles Edgar Loseby
- Succeeded by: Thomas Fenby
- In office 30 May 1929 – 27 October 1931
- Preceded by: Thomas Fenby
- Succeeded by: Joseph Hepworth

Personal details
- Born: 31 January 1864 Bradford, West Yorkshire, England
- Died: 1 February 1944 (aged 80) Bradford, West Yorkshire, England
- Party: Labour
- Spouse: Emily Foster (m. 1884; died 1931)
- Children: 3
- Education: Bradford Technical College

Frederick William Jowett (31 January 1864 – 1 February 1944) was a British Labour politician and prominent left-wing figure, who was associated with the Independent Labour Party (ILP), twice serving as its Chair between 1909 and 1917. He was later appointed to serve in Ramsay MacDonald’s first ever Labour government as First Commissioner of Works.

== Early life ==
Frederick William Jowett was born on 31 January 1864 in Bradford. He was the son of Nathan Jowett, a cotton warp dresser, and Emma née Gerry. Jowett had seven siblings; receiving a limited, working class, education, he began work when he was eight years old. Remaining in Bradford, Jowett worked part-time in textiles until he was thirteen and went full-time. He supplemented his education through personal reading and attendance at Bradford Mechanics' Institute Library and Bradford Technical College.

== Trade unionism ==
By the time of his marriage in 1884, Jowett had become involved in the trade union and labour movements. His influences in doing so included the writings of Thomas Carlyle and John Ruskin. Two years later Jowett joined the Socialist League. When his local branch of that closed in 1889, he instead became a founding member, and secretary, of the Labour Electoral Association. The goal of the new organisation was to promote the election of working-class men to parliament. With the textile industry declining in Bradford, between December 1890 and April 1891 there was a strike at Manningham Mills. This brought emphasis to the trade union and labour movement locally, which quickly grew. Jowett became the president of the new Bradford Labour Church.

The Bradford Independent Labour Party (ILP) had been formed in the wake of the Manningham Mills Strike, in 1891. In November 1892 Jowett, representing the party, contested and won a seat on the town council. In this position he pushed for municipal socialism, at times chairing the sanitary committee and health committee. Focusing on the issue of housing, he wrote about this work in The Socialist and the City, published in 1907.

== Parliamentary office ==
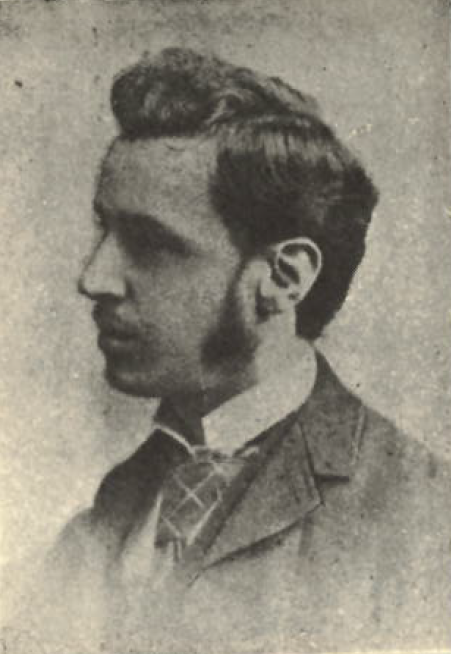
Jowett c. 1900

Jowett continued throughout this period with the Independent Labour Party, and soon became a parliamentary candidate for the party. His first contested election was the 1900 United Kingdom general election, where he was narrowly defeated for the Bradford West seat by the Conservative Ernest Flower. Jowett remained on Bradford City Council, as it now was, until he again fought the contest for Bradford West at the 1906 United Kingdom general election. This time he successfully unseated Flower, becoming the constituency's member of parliament.

In his new role Jowett was a staunch supporter of the working class, highlighting issues such as the lack of available school meals. He also campaigned for the democratisation of parliament, advocating for an increased use of oversight committees, and against the continued use of secret diplomacy in international relations. Opposed to war, which he believed secret diplomacy caused, he spoke out again the Second Boer War which had begun in 1899. Jowett wrote about the need to further democratise parliament in the 1909 What's the Use of Parliament?, and between 1909 and 1910 served as chairman of the ILP. Throughout this period Jowett was an opponent of Ramsay MacDonald, the leader of the Labour Party, leaning further to the left side of the party than McDonald did. He split from the majority opinion of the Parliamentary Labour Party in 1911 when he refused to vote in favour of the National Insurance Bill because of the requirement for financial contributions.

Jowett was a member of the select committee which investigated the Putumayo genocide in 1913. He was elected again as ILP chairman in the following year. Jowett continued in parliament through the First World War, and as with the Boer War was consistently against the manner in which it was fought. He became a member of the Union of Democratic Control, advocating for more defined war aims and the prioritising of peace negotiations. At the 1918 United Kingdom general election Jowett's seat of Bradford West was abolished, and he instead ran for Bradford East, losing to the National Democratic Charles Loseby.

== Labour Party governance ==
Without an elected seat for the first time since 1892, Jowett focused his efforts towards the central governance of the Labour Party. He served as the ILP representative to the executive of the party, and then from 1921 to 1922 was chairman of the Labour Party. He frequently joined foreign delegations in this role, including travelling to Hungary to investigate the White Terror, Geneva for the International Socialist Conference, and Ireland for enquiries into political actions relating to the Irish War of Independence. In this latter position, Jowett campaigned for the withdrawal of British troops in the conflict, and for Britain to allow Ireland the right to self-determination.

== First return to parliament ==
Jowett fought Bradford East again at the 1922 United Kingdom general election, this time beating out Loseby and returning to parliament. There he became chairman of the Public Accounts Committee. Retaining his seat at the 1923 United Kingdom general election, in January the following year Jowett was appointed the First Commissioner of Works, making him a member of the Cabinet of the First MacDonald ministry. Serving alongside fellow left-winger John Wheatley, both refused to wear morning dress during their official appointment meeting with George V.

As First Commissioner of Works, Jowett authorised projects including the Rima statue by Jacob Epstein for the William Henry Hudson memorial in Hyde Park, London. He continued to advocate for socialist policies, and was an opponent of working with the Liberal Party which supported the Labour minority government. At the 1924 United Kingdom general election Jowett lost Bradford East to the Liberal Thomas Fenby.

== Further ILP involvement ==
Jowett subsequently returned to his close connection with the ILP, working to move it further to the left alongside politicians such as Wheatley and James Maxton. He returned to the chairmanship of the ILP between 1925 and 1926. Through this period Jowett continued his advocacy for the democratisation of both parliament and political parties, writing the pamphlet Parliament or Palaver? on the subject in the latter year. He brought his arguments for the further reliance on committees in parliament to the ILP conference that year, but was not supported by McDonald and the wider leadership who felt that his ideas would lead to parliament being permanently in coalition. A supporter of the 1926 United Kingdom general strike, Jowett was elected as treasurer of the ILP in the following year, holding that position for the rest of his life.

== Second return to parliament ==
Jowett fought and won Bradford East at the 1929 United Kingdom general election, defeating the incumbent Fenby. In this parliament, the Second MacDonald ministry, Jowett moved to become a more concrete opponent of the mainstream Labour Party. Advocating for the continued autonomy of the ILP within the Labour Party, he refused to sign a declaration that all parliamentary candidates would follow the ideology of the Parliamentary Labour Party, and proposed a socialist amendment to the speech from the throne.

Jowett was defeated by Joseph Hepworth at the 1931 United Kingdom general election, and in July the following year the ILP disassociated itself from the Labour Party. Jowett was supportive of this despite the political marginalisation it would cause the party, because it allowed them to stick to their principles, but was not one of the members who looked to the ILP as an alternative form of revolution in the country. He was against those who attempted to work with the Communist Party of Great Britain, and did not want the party to move any further left. He stood as an ILP candidate, separate to Labour, for Bradford East at the 1935 United Kingdom general election, but was again defeated by Hepworth.

== Post-parliament career ==
Now fully out of parliament but retaining his socialist interests, Jowett remained working in Bradford, discussing his political actions and continuing to advocate for reform, a living wage, and against war. Writing a weekly article for the ILP News, he was not a supporter of Red Clydeside and populism. When the Second World War began in 1939 Jowett continued his policies of the first war. Opposing the conflict as a whole, he again campaigned for war aims and peace negotiations.

Jowett died at his home in Bradford on 1 February 1944 and was cremated at Scholemoor cemetery. His memorial service at Horton Lane Congregational Chapel was highlighted by a speech by Maxton who described Jowett as "one of the giants of the labour movement".

== Personal life ==
Jowett married Emily Foster, the daughter of a Bradford wool-waste dealer, on 19 July 1884. They had three children. According to Labour Heritage, Emily shared Jowett's socialist convictions and supported him throughout his political career. She died in September 1931.

== Works ==
- What Made Me a Socialist. Glasgow, Scotland: Strickland Press, 1941.

== Citations ==
Parliament of the United Kingdom
Preceded by Sir Ernest Flower	Member of Parliament for Bradford West; 1906–1918	Constituency abolished
Preceded by Charles Edgar Loseby	Member of Parliament for Bradford East; 1922–1924	Succeeded by Thomas Fenby
Preceded by Thomas Fenby	Member of Parliament for Bradford East; 1929–1931	Succeeded by Joseph Hepworth
Party political offices
Preceded by Ramsay MacDonald	Chairman of the Independent Labour Party; 1909–1911	Succeeded by William Anderson
Preceded by Keir Hardie	Chairman of the Independent Labour Party; 1914–1917	Succeeded by Philip Snowden
Preceded by Alexander Gordon Cameron	Chair of the Labour Party; 1921–1922	Succeeded by Sidney Webb
Preceded by Charles Roden Buxton	Treasurer of the Independent Labour Party; 1927–1944	Succeeded by Percy Williams
Political offices
Preceded by Sir John Baird	First Commissioner of Works; 1924	Succeeded by Viscount Peel
