= George Wadsworth (politician) =

British politician (1902–1979)

Member of Parliament for Buckrose
- In office 26 July 1945 – 3 February 1950
- Preceded by: Albert Braithwaite
- Succeeded by: Constituency abolished
- Majority: 949

Personal details
- Born: 10 December 1902
- Died: 18 April 1979 (aged 76)
- Party: Liberal
- Other political affiliations: National Liberal
- Education: Heath Grammar School, Halifax; Willaston College, Nantwich
- Occupation: Businessman

George Wadsworth (10 December 1902 – 18 April 1979) was a businessman and Liberal Party politician in the United Kingdom. He owned his own companies and sat for an East Yorkshire constituency.

== Background ==
Wadsworth was a son of Arnold Holroyd Wadsworth, of Halifax. He was educated at Heath Grammar School, Halifax and Willaston College, Nantwich. In 1930 he married Guinevere Shepherd and together they had two daughters, Rosemary and Shirley. Shirley the eldest daughter, at age 13, was drowned in a tragic accident off the coast of North Wales in 1944.

== Business career ==
Wadsworth was managing director of G Wadsworth & Sons Ltd, Wadsworth White Lead Co., Ltd and of G. Wadsworth and Son, Ltd. He was the founder Chairman of Halifax Round Table.

== Political career ==
Wadsworth was a Liberal member of Halifax Town Council. He served from 1938 to 1945. He was Vice-Chairman of Halifax Watch, Safety First, Lighting Committee.

At the 1945 general election, Wadsworth was elected Member of Parliament (MP) for the East Riding of Yorkshire constituency of Buckrose. He gained the seat from the Conservatives by a majority of 949 votes, benefiting from the absence of a Labour candidate.

In the House of Commons, he served on the Public Accounts Select Committee from 1945 to 1949. He was a member of parliamentary delegations to Hungary, Switzerland and Italy. In 1949 he attended the European military exercises in Germany as a Parliamentary observer.

At the 1950 election, following boundary changes, Wadsworth contested the re-drawn seat of Bridlington. This time he had a Labour opponent as well as a Conservative. The Conservative comfortably won the seat.

Wadsworth contested the Sheffield Hillsborough constituency in the 1951 general election as a National Liberal candidate but failed to take the seat from Labour.

=== Election results ===
General election 1945: Buckrose
| Party | Candidate | Votes | % | ±% |
|---|---|---|---|---|
| Liberal | George Wadsworth | 15,934 | 51.5 | +6.6 |
| Conservative | Albert Braithwaite | 14,985 | 48.5 | −6.6 |
| Majority | | 949 | 3.1 | 13.2 |
| Turnout | | | 71.9 | −6.5 |
| Liberal gain from Conservative | | Swing | +6.6 | |

General election 1950: Bridlington
| Party | Candidate | Votes | % | ±% |
|---|---|---|---|---|
| Conservative | Richard Wood | 26,124 | 50.9 | n/a |
| Liberal | George Wadsworth | 16,158 | 31.5 | n/a |
| Labour | Wilfrid Pashby | 9,013 | 17.6 | n/a |
| Majority | | 9,966 | 19.4 | n/a |
| Turnout | | | 81.9 | n/a |
| Conservative hold | | Swing | n/a | |

General election 1951: Sheffield Hillsborough
| Party | Candidate | Votes | % | ±% |
|---|---|---|---|---|
| Labour Co-op | George Darling | 28,274 | 59.0 | +0.3 |
| National Liberal | George Wadsworth | 19,617 | 41.0 | +1.2 |
| Majority | | 8,657 | 18.0 | −0.9 |
| Turnout | | | 84.9 | −2.2 |
| Labour Co-op hold | | Swing | -0.5 | |

Parliament of the United Kingdom
| Preceded by Albert Braithwaite | Member of Parliament for Buckrose; 1945–1950 | Constituency abolished |
