= Joseph Hepworth (politician) =

British politician

Joseph Hepworth (c. 1876 – 11 May 1945) was a British Conservative Party politician.

At the 1931 general election, he was elected as Member of Parliament (MP) for Bradford East, defeating the sitting Labour Party MP Fred Jowett. He was re-elected at the 1935 general election, and served in the House of Commons until his death shortly before the 1945 general election.

He served as Bradford Northern R.F.C. Chairman for four years.

Parliament of the United Kingdom
Preceded by Fred Jowett	Member of Parliament for Bradford East; 1931–1945	Succeeded by Frank McLeavy
