= Buckrose (constituency) =

Parliamentary constituency in the United Kingdom, 1885–1950

Yorkshire, East Riding, Buckrose Division
- Former county constituency for the House of Commons
- County: East Riding of Yorkshire

1885–1950
- Created from: East Riding of Yorkshire
- Replaced by: Bridlington and Beverley

Buckrose was a county constituency of the House of Commons of the Parliament of the United Kingdom, comprising the northern part of the East Riding of Yorkshire, represented by one Member of Parliament, and was created for the 1885 general election.

Buckrose was abolished for the 1950 general election, when boundary changes reduced the East Riding's number of county constituencies from three to two, the eastern part of the constituency and most of the voters being included in the new Bridlington constituency and the remainder in the Beverley constituency.

== Boundaries ==
1885–1918: The Sessional Divisions of Bainton Beacon, Buckrose, and Dickering.

1918–1950: The Borough of Bridlington, the Urban Districts of Filey, Great Driffield, and Norton, and the Rural Districts of Bridlington, Driffield, Norton, and Sherburn.

The constituency consisted of the northern third of the East Riding of Yorkshire. The largest town in the seat was Bridlington, but it also included Filey, Driffield, and Norton, as well as numerous villages, and the rural element was predominant. At the time of the 1921 census, almost two-fifths (38%) of the occupied male population were engaged in agriculture.

== Name ==
Buckrose took its name from the wapentake of Buckrose, one of the medieval sub-divisions of the East Riding which, however, had long ceased to have much administrative significance by 1885, and had covered only part of the area of the constituency and a minority of its population. (The constituency also included the whole of the former wapentake of Dickering, which included Bridlington and Filey, and part of the wapentake of Harthill which included Driffield.) The name seems to have been chosen primarily to avoid offending any local sensibilities, and with little regard for comprehensibility (a criticism also levelled at many of the other new constituency names created under the 1885 Reform Act).

== Members of Parliament ==
Election	Member	Party
1885	Christopher Sykes	Conservative
1886	William Alexander McArthur	Liberal
1886	Christopher Sykes	Conservative
1892	Sir Angus Holden	Liberal
1900	Sir Luke White	Liberal
1918	Algernon Moreing	Coalition Liberal
1922	Guy Gaunt	Conservative
1926 by-election	Sir Albert Braithwaite	Conservative
1945	George Wadsworth	Liberal
1950	constituency abolished: see Bridlington and Beverley	

== Elections ==
=== Elections in the 1880s ===
General election 1885: Buckrose
Party	Candidate	Votes	%	±%
Conservative	Christopher Sykes	4,081	51.9	
Liberal	John James Cousins	3,785	48.1	
Majority		296	3.8	
Turnout		7,866	86.3	
Registered electors		9,113		
Conservative win (new seat)				

General election 1886: Buckrose
Party	Candidate	Votes	%	±%
Conservative	Christopher Sykes	3,735	50.1	−1.8
Liberal	William Alexander McArthur	3,724	49.9	+1.8
Majority		11	0.2	−3.6
Turnout		7,459	81.9	−4.4
Registered electors		9,113		
Conservative hold		Swing	-1.8	

- At the General Election of 1886, McArthur was declared the victor over Sykes by a single vote, 3,742 to 3,741, and took his seat, but "on scrutiny" the seat was eventually awarded to his opponent, Sykes, by a majority of 11 votes.

=== Elections in the 1890s ===
Fison

General election 1892: Buckrose
Party	Candidate	Votes	%	±%
Liberal	Angus Holden	4,294	54.1	+4.2
Conservative	Frederick Fison	3,642	45.9	−4.2
Majority		652	8.2	N/A
Turnout		7,936	87.8	+5.9
Registered electors		9,035		
Liberal gain from Conservative		Swing	+4.2	

Holden

General election 1895: Buckrose
Party	Candidate	Votes	%	±%
Liberal	Angus Holden	4,076	50.6	−3.5
Conservative	Thomas Goff	3,986	49.4	+3.5
Majority		90	1.2	−7.0
Turnout		8,062	86.8	−1.0
Registered electors		9,284		
Liberal hold		Swing	-3.5	

=== Elections in the 1900s ===
White

General election 1900: Buckrose
Party	Candidate	Votes	%	±%
Liberal	Luke White	4,083	50.6	+0.0
Liberal Unionist	Ernest Meysey-Thompson	3,992	49.4	−0.0
Majority		91	1.2	+0.0
Turnout		8,075	83.7	−3.1
Registered electors		9,652		
Liberal hold		Swing	+0.0	

General election 1906: Buckrose
Party	Candidate	Votes	%	±%
Liberal	Luke White	5,236	59.0	+8.4
Conservative	Reginald Bethune	3,634	41.0	−8.4
Majority		1,602	18.0	+16.8
Turnout		8,870	87.4	+3.7
Registered electors		10,151		
Liberal hold		Swing	+8.4	

=== Elections in the 1910s ===
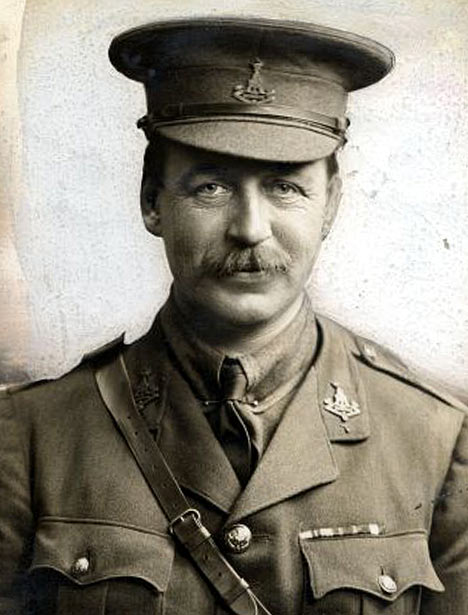
Sykes

General election January 1910: Buckrose
Party	Candidate	Votes	%	±%
Liberal	Luke White	4,957	51.1	−7.9
Conservative	Mark Sykes	4,739	48.9	+7.9
Majority		218	2.2	−15.8
Turnout		9,696	91.0	+3.6
Liberal hold		Swing	-7.9	

General election December 1910: Buckrose
Party	Candidate	Votes	%	±%
Liberal	Luke White	4,867	51.2	+0.1
Conservative	Mark Sykes	4,635	48.8	−0.1
Majority		232	2.4	+0.2
Turnout		9,502	89.2	−1.8
Liberal hold		Swing	+0.1	

General Election 1914–15: Another General Election was required to take place before the end of 1915. The political parties had been making preparations for an election to take place from 1914 and by the end of this year, the following candidates had been selected;

- Liberal: Luke White

General election 1918: Buckrose
Party		Candidate	Votes	%	±%
C	National Liberal	Algernon Moreing	9,310	60.9	N/A
	Independent Labour	George Henry Dawson	3,176	20.8	New
	Liberal	Austin Taylor	2,792	18.3	−32.9
Majority			6,134	40.1	N/A
Turnout			15,278	56.0	−33.2
	National Liberal gain from Liberal		Swing		
C indicates candidate endorsed by the coalition government.

=== Elections in the 1920s ===
Fenby

General election 1922: Buckrose
Party	Candidate	Votes	%	±%
Unionist	Guy Gaunt	12,012	51.3	New
Liberal	Thomas Fenby	11,411	48.7	+30.4
Majority		601	2.6	N/A
Turnout		23,423	82.5	+26.5
Unionist gain from National Liberal		Swing		

General election 1923: Buckrose
Party	Candidate	Votes	%	±%
Unionist	Guy Gaunt	12,336	50.4	−0.9
Liberal	Thomas Fenby	12,122	49.6	+0.9
Majority		214	0.8	−1.8
Turnout		24,458	84.1	+1.6
Unionist hold		Swing	-0.9	

General election 1924: Buckrose
Party	Candidate	Votes	%	±%
Unionist	Guy Gaunt	13,966	56.0	+5.6
Liberal	Harry Briggs	10,962	44.0	−5.6
Majority		3,004	12.0	+11.2
Turnout		24,928	82.9	−1.2
Unionist hold		Swing	+5.6	

1926 Buckrose by-election
Party	Candidate	Votes	%	±%
Unionist	Albert Braithwaite	12,098	48.7	−7.3
Liberal	Harry Verney	10,537	42.5	−1.5
Labour	Herbert Cecil Laycock	2,191	8.8	New
Majority		1,552	6.2	−5.8
Turnout		24,826	81.7	−1.2
Unionist hold		Swing	-2.9	

General election 1929: Buckrose
Party	Candidate	Votes	%	±%
Unionist	Albert Braithwaite	15,625	50.0	+1.3
Liberal	Sidney Streatfield Leigh Lamert	13,885	44.4	+1.9
Labour	Harold H Vickers	1,766	5.6	−3.2
Majority		1.740	5.6	−0.6
Turnout		31,216	80.4	−1.3
Unionist hold		Swing	-0.3	

=== Elections in the 1930s ===
General election 1931: Buckrose
Party	Candidate	Votes	%	±%
Conservative	Albert Braithwaite	Unopposed		
Conservative hold				

General election 1935: Buckrose
Party	Candidate	Votes	%	±%
Conservative	Albert Braithwaite	18,090	55.1	N/A
Liberal	Thomas Macleod	14,763	44.9	New
Majority		3,327	10.2	N/A
Turnout		32,853	78.4	N/A
Conservative hold		Swing		

=== Elections in the 1940s ===
General Election 1939–40:

Another General Election was required to take place before the end of 1940. The political parties had been making preparations for an election to take place from 1939 and by the end of this year, the following candidates had been selected;

- Conservative: Albert Braithwaite
- Liberal: Thomas Macleod

General election 1945: Buckrose
Party	Candidate	Votes	%	±%
Liberal	George Wadsworth	15,934	51.5	+6.6
Conservative	Albert Braithwaite	14,985	48.5	−6.6
Majority		949	3.0	N/A
Turnout		30,919	71.9	−6.5
Liberal gain from Conservative		Swing	+6.6	
