= Algernon Moreing =

British politician (1889-1974)

Algernon Henry Moreing
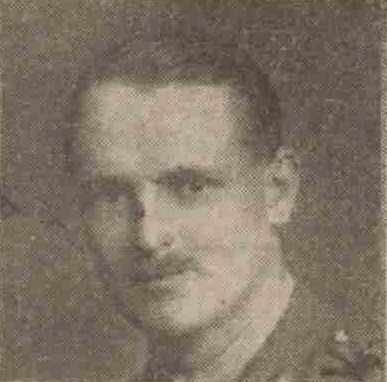

Member of Parliament for Buckrose
- In office 1918–1922
- Preceded by: Sir Luke White
- Succeeded by: Guy Gaunt

Member of Parliament for Camborne
- In office 1922–1923
- Preceded by: Francis Acland
- Succeeded by: Leif Jones

Member of Parliament for Camborne
- In office 1924–1929
- Preceded by: Leif Jones
- Succeeded by: Leif Jones

Personal details
- Born: 30 September 1889 London, England
- Died: 22 October 1974 (aged 85) Suffolk, England
- Party: Conservative party National Liberal party
- Parent: Charles Algernon Moreing (father)
- Relatives: Adrian Moreing (brother)
- Education: Winchester College
- Alma mater: Trinity College, Cambridge
- Military career
- Allegiance: United Kingdom
- Branch: British Army
- Service years: 1914–1918
- Rank: Captain
- Units: 283rd (London) Brigade, Royal Field Artillery
- Conflicts: World War I

Algernon Henry Moreing (30 September 1889 – 22 October 1974) was a British politician who served as a member of parliament for Buckrose 1918–22, and Camborne 1922–23 and 1924–29.

== Early life ==
Moreing was born in September 1889, in London, England, to Helena (born in the North West Province of India) and Charles Algernon Moreing, a civil and mining engineer originally from New South Wales, Australia (1911 Census, England). He was educated at Winchester School and Trinity College, Cambridge. He became a partner, as did his brother Adrian Charles Moreing (also an MP), in his father's mining engineers firm, Messrs Berwick, Moreing & Co.

== World War I ==
Early in the war he was commissioned into the 283rd (London) Brigade, Royal Field Artillery (RFA), Territorial Force, and saw active service with the British Expeditionary Force in France with its Ammunition Column; on 20 June 1916 he was appointed Officer Commanding of No.3 Section, 56th (London) Divisional Ammunition Column. He was discharged from the RFA at the end of his military career with the rank of captain. (Medal Index Card, & 56th Div. Ammo Col War Diary WO/95/2941 at The National Archive, Kew, Surrey).

== Political career ==
Moreing was first elected to Parliament in 1918 as the MP for Buckrose in Yorkshire, switching to contest Camborne in Cornwall in 1922. He was a Liberal who supported the Coalition government led by Lloyd George. At the 1923 general election, following Liberal unification, he stood as the official Liberal candidate. However, he lost his seat to an Independent Liberal candidate, Leif Jones. After that election concluded, he supported Winston Churchill's efforts to revive the Conservative/Liberal coalition. He fought the 1924 general election as a Constitutionalist and regained his seat from Leif Jones. After the 1924 election, he took the Conservative whip. In 1929, standing as a Conservative, he lost the Camborne seat again to Jones.

== Death ==
He died in Suffolk, England, in October 1974 aged 85.

Parliament of the United Kingdom
| Preceded by Sir Luke White | Member of Parliament for Buckrose; 1918 – 1922 | Succeeded by Guy Gaunt |
| Preceded by Francis Acland | Member of Parliament for Camborne; 1922 – 1923 | Succeeded by Leif Jones |
| Preceded by Leif Jones | Member of Parliament for Camborne; 1924–1929 | Succeeded by Leif Jones |
