= Thomas Fenby =

British politician (1875–1956)

Thomas Fenby

Thomas Davis Fenby (1875 – 4 August 1956) was a British Liberal politician and blacksmith.

== Early life ==
Fenby was born in Bridlington in the East Riding of Yorkshire, the son of a master of a local blacksmith's forge. He was educated at Bridlington School. He learned his father's trade and later headed the family business, often working at the forge himself until only a few years before his death. In 1900 he married Elizabeth Ann Adamson; they had two daughters.

== Yorkshire public life ==
Fenby was important in local public life. Appointed a magistrate in 1910, he was for many years the Chairman of the Pickering magistrates and he succeeded the Earl of Halifax as chairman of quarter sessions. He was also Chairman of the East Riding Summary Jurisdiction Appeals Committee and vice-Chairman of the Rating Appeals Committee, the rates being a question he later addressed in Parliament. He was granted an extension to serve as a magistrate by the Lord Chancellor and only finally retired from the Bench in 1951. In the 1940s he was a member of the Management Committee of Bridlington Hospital. He died at his home in Bridlington aged 81.

== Politics ==
Fenby first entered local politics and was Mayor of Bridlington and a County Councillor, eventually becoming vice-Chairman of East Riding County Council and an Alderman. At the 1918 general election he unsuccessfully contested the Howdenshire Division of Yorkshire and in the general elections of 1922 and 1923 he fought the Buckrose division of Yorkshire. He was successful however at the 1924 general election when he was elected Liberal Member of Parliament for East Bradford, defeating the sitting Labour MP and First Commissioner of Works, Frederick William Jowett in a straight fight by just 66 votes. However he lost the seat back to Jowett in the 1929 general election, although again the Conservatives decided not to put up a candidate. Fenby apparently gained a reputation at Westminster for being unconventional and independent minded and was a good platform speaker. He was well regarded for his knowledge of local government and agricultural and associated issues, which he often championed with the Ministry of Agriculture (e.g. The Times, 24 June 1926). He was sometime chairman of the Association of North of England Smallholders and urged the government to provide local authorities with the funds to provide additional smallholdings to keep agricultural labourers on the land and often spoke in favour of smallholders in Parliament. He was made a Whip of the English Liberal MPs in 1926.

== The Radical Group ==
Inevitably, Fenby was caught up in the turmoil within the Liberal Party arising from the rivalries of David Lloyd George and H H Asquith. With Asquith out of the House of Commons after 1924, Lloyd George was elected chairman of the Parliamentary Liberal Party. However, there remained a number of Liberals who remained loyal to Asquith, but more importantly, became anti-Lloyd George. Led by Walter Runciman this group of 'conservative' Asquithians formed the 'Radical Group' in December 1924. Fenby was a founder member of this Radical Group which in 1927 became the Liberal Council, a formal organisation within the party, opposed to the social policies being developed under the leadership of Lloyd George. Fenby's distrust of Lloyd George lasted at least until 1926 when he was one of ten Liberal MPs who voted against his continuing leadership of the Parliamentary party.

Two radical causes Fenby espoused were birth control and the abolition of capital punishment. In April 1926 he was a signatory to a letter to the Manchester Guardian, along with Bertrand Russell, H N Brailsford and Violet Bonham Carter – amongst others – urging support for a bill not to withhold birth control information given to married women. In December 1924 he was part of delegation to then Home Secretary, Sir William Joynson-Hicks unsuccessfully seeking a reprieve from execution for a convicted murderer from Hull, William Smith.

Parliament of the United Kingdom
Preceded by Fred Jowett	Member of Parliament for Bradford East; 1924–1929	Succeeded by Fred Jowett
