= Salma Yaqoob =

British politician (born 1971)

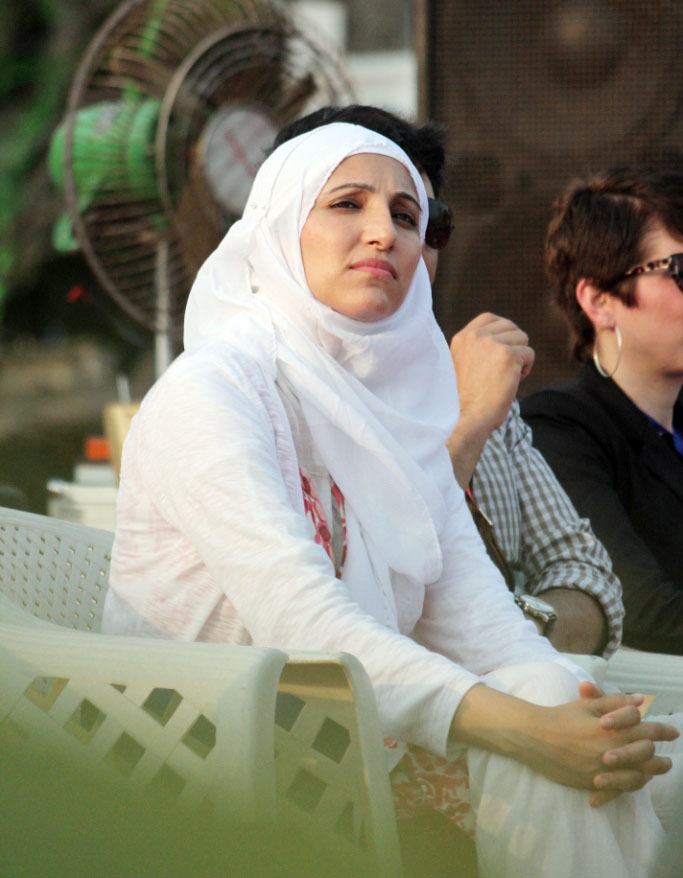
- Yaqoob in May 2013

Leader of the Respect Party
- In office 8 August 2005 – 11 September 2012
- Preceded by: Linda Smith
- Succeeded by: Arshad Ali

Personal details
- Born: Salma Sultana Yaqoob; 15 August 1971 (age 55) Bradford, West Riding of Yorkshire, England
- Party: Green (2026 - present)
- Other political affiliations: Your Party (2025); Labour (2019–2025); Respect (2004–2012)
- Spouse: Waqar Azmi
- Education: Aston University
- Occupation: Political activist; psychotherapist

Salma Yaqoob (born 15 August 1971) is a British political activist and psychotherapist who served as the Leader of the Respect Party from 2005 until 2012, representing the party on Birmingham City Council.

She led the Birmingham Stop the War Coalition and is a patron of Stop the War Coalition UK. She unsuccessfully stood to be the Labour Party candidate for Mayor of the West Midlands in the 2021 mayoral election, finishing third out of three candidates.

She has been a spokesperson for Birmingham Central Mosque.

Yaqoob has also contributed to news outlets, including HuffPost, The Guardian and the New Statesman.

== Early life ==
Yaqoob's father, Mohammed, emigrated to the UK as a headmaster from Gujar Khan in Pakistan and worked in the Lister Mills in Bradford before joining the Royal Mail. He married Yaqoob's mother, Gulzarda, also from Pakistan, in the 1960s. Yaqoob was born in Bradford on 15 August 1971. When she was one, the family moved from St Albans to the East Midlands, and later to Birmingham, where she was raised. She describes herself as having been a "tomboyish girl" who played football on the streets of Alum Rock.

She studied biochemistry, then human and applied psychology at Aston University, before completing a postgraduate diploma in integrative psychotherapy and counselling at Birmingham City University.

== Professional career ==
Yaqoob runs a part-time psychotherapy practice.

She is employed as a Community Engagement Senior Manager at the Birmingham and Solihull Mental Health NHS Foundation Trust.

In April 2014, she was appointed Independent Chair of the Stakeholder Council of Birmingham South Central Clinical Commissioning Group.

== Political career ==
=== Stop the War Coalition ===
Yaqoob was inspired to become politically active following the September 11 attacks, claiming to have been spat at on the streets of Birmingham in the days following. She began to attend meetings of Stop the War Coalition and was elected its chair before September 2002, when she addressed a meeting alongside George Galloway. She founded the group's Birmingham branch.

=== Respect ===
In January 2004, she co-founded Respect – the Unity Coalition (later Respect Party) with George Monbiot.

==== 2005 general election ====
At the 2005 general election, she stood as the Respect candidate for the Birmingham Sparkbrook and Small Heath constituency against Labour MP Roger Godsiff, with the backing of the Muslim Association of Britain. She finished in second place, ahead of the Liberal Democrat and Conservative candidates, and with 27.5% of the total vote.

==== 2006: elected as Respect councillor ====
Yaqoob was elected with 49.4% of the vote in the Sparkbrook ward of Birmingham City Council in the 2006 local elections. She was re-elected to the post in May 2010.

==== 2010 general election ====
Yaqoob stood in the 2010 general election for the Respect Party in the Birmingham Hall Green constituency, and came second to Roger Godsiff of the Labour Party, trailing by 3,799 votes.

Yaqoob attained 13.9% of the vote, chiefly from the Labour incumbent – the Labour candidate lost 11.7% of the total vote, election-to-election. The Green Party, after a members' vote, had stood down its candidate in favour of Yaqoob. She was endorsed by then-Green Party leader Caroline Lucas and the retiring Labour MP for Birmingham Selly Oak, Lynne Jones.

In 2011 Yaqoob claimed to have been offered a choice of two 'safe seats' by the Labour Party, one in Birmingham and one in the Black Country, in the lead-up to the 2010 general election. She stated she had declined the offer.

Yaqoob became the leader of the Respect Party, making her the only Muslim female leader of a Parliamentary political party in British history.

==== Council ceremony in 2011 ====
At a Birmingham City Council meeting in early February 2011, Yaqoob and another Respect Party councillor, Mohammed Ishtiaq, sat with their arms folded and refused to participate in a standing ovation at a meeting at which Britain's most highly decorated serving marine and Afghanistan veteran Lance Corporal Matthew Croucher, GC, RMR was a guest. This led to widespread criticism from other councillors, including allegations that it was a disrespectful act. The two councillors argued they were protesting against "false patriotism" by politicians, while defending their own history of support of individual troops.

Martin Mullaney, a Liberal Democrat councillor, alleged afterwards that Yaqoob would have applauded were the 21 July failed bombers being honoured. He later apologised for this claim.

==== Media appearances for Respect ====
Yaqoob has made six appearances on the panel of BBC One's Question Time programme. Her first appearance was in Skegness, 19 January 2006, shortly before her election as a councillor. She returned in Preston (October 2006), followed by her home town of Birmingham on 8 February 2007 and Bath on 12 February 2009.

On 10 December 2009, Question Time was held in Wootton Bassett, a town where the bodies of UK troops killed in Afghanistan pass through and are informally mourned. Salma Yaqoob stated that she "would be proud to have my sons defend this country" and argued for better support for UK troops and their withdrawal from Afghanistan.

She made her sixth appearance on the show on Thursday 10 June 2010, when it was broadcast from Plymouth. She was joined on the panel by Ben Bradshaw, Jeremy Hunt, Katie Hopkins and Toby Young.

Yaqoob has also made appearances on The Politics Show, This Week, Daily Politics, 10 O'Clock Live, and Frost Over the World.

=== Independent ===
==== Resignation as councillor and leaving Respect ====
On 7 July 2011, Yaqoob announced her intention to stand down as a Birmingham City councillor, citing health reasons.

On 11 September 2012, Yaqoob announced her resignation from the Respect Party after what she described as a difficult few weeks and a breakdown in relations. Yaqoob had distanced herself from comments made by George Galloway about rape and the allegations made against Julian Assange. In an interview with Aida Edemariam of The Guardian, Yaqoob said that she was being forced into making a "false choice" between Galloway's "anti-imperialist stances" and defending women's rights. Green Party MP Caroline Lucas and Labour MP Richard Burden publicly offered their support to Yaqoob.

In December 2015, it was reported that Yaqoob had applied to become a Labour Party member in Hall Green. The local constituency executive committee refused her membership, because she had previously stood against Labour candidates and previously opposed the Iraq War.

==== Hands off Birmingham schools ====
Yaqoob co-led the "Hands off Birmingham schools" group, which was set up in 2014 in response to Trojan Horse scandal.

==== Iain Duncan Smith "scrounger" comment ====
In 2014 episode of Question Time which went viral online, Yaqoob called the then-Secretary of State for Work and Pensions Iain Duncan Smith "patronising" for his views on poverty. She also said that Duncan Smith "labels poor people as scroungers when [he] claim[s] £39 for a breakfast" and "live[s] on [his] wife's estate and [has] taken a million pounds of taxpayers' money, that's what I call scrounging". Duncan Smith denied claiming the money for his breakfast or labelling poor people as "scroungers".

==== 2017 general election ====
Yaqoob stood in the 2017 general election as an independent candidate in the Bradford West constituency. She came third with 13.9% of the votes, 2.7% behind the second-placed Conservative Party candidate. Her standing was mired in controversy, after complaints by Labour HQ about her use of photographs of her with Labour leader Jeremy Corbyn and her claims that she was a pro-Corbyn candidate. Responding to the complaint, Yaqoob stated that "at no point in the leaflet do I make the claim of an endorsement from Jeremy Corbyn or the Labour Party." A spokesperson for the party later clarified that "there is only one Labour Party candidate in Bradford West and that is Naz Shah." In response, Yaqoob claimed that the statements made by Labour constituted "malicious accusations" and said that Shah was playing a "petty political game".

=== Labour Party ===
==== 2020 West Midlands mayoral candidacy ====
In September 2019, Yaqoob announced that she had applied for the Labour Party candidacy for mayor of the West Midlands in the 2021 West Midlands mayoral election, an executive position responsible for the metropolitan county of the West Midlands despite her previous opposition to the Iraq war. The position was held by Conservative Andy Street. Her campaign for the candidacy was framed around progressivism, anti-austeritism and the Green New Deal.

Yaqoob's application was criticised in a leaked email written by Labour MP Naz Shah published in October 2019. In this Shah criticised Yaqoob, calling her "despicable", following the 2017 campaign in which Yaqoob stood against her, concluding: "I believe she endorsed misogyny, patriarchy and biradri politics". In a Guardian article, Yaqoob denied running such a campaign, but issued a statement stating that "I did not run or endorse a campaign of misogyny, patriarchy and clan politics. Even as a political opponent I showed her respect as a woman and a public figure". She also said: "As shadow equalities and women minister, I would hope Naz Shah would welcome the principle of women coming forward for political office – even those she disagrees with. I am saddened that she is lobbying nationally to limit the right of local Labour members to make their own choice by seeking to remove me from even a potential shortlist." Yaqoob retained the support of Momentum head Jon Lansman, and was eventually endorsed by Momentum. In the first round she received 26% of the vote, less than the two other candidates.

=== Involvement in Collective and Your Party ===
During the private meetings of the Collective party in the autumn of 2024, Yaqoob emerged alongside Jeremy Corbyn, Andrew Feinstein and Lutfur Rahman as one of the proposed leaders of a new left-wing political formation, later known by the interim name of Your Party. She is thought to have joined Feinstein's and Jamie Driscoll's faction, united by its opposition to Corbyn's ex-chief of staff Karie Murphy and the former Unite the Union head Len McCluskey, and advocacy of a grassroots localist federation-type movement rooted in citizens' assemblies.

Yaqoob chaired the decisive online meeting of Collective's informal organising committee on 3 July 2025, at which Feinstein submitted a motion proposing to invite Zarah Sultana to leave Labour and join the new party as an "interim co-leader" with Corbyn. Yaqoob called the vote and supported Feinstein's motion, whose adoption led to Sultana's public announcement of Your Party and claim to joint leadership on the same evening.

=== Green Party ===
As of October 2026, Yaqoob was a member of the Green Party. At that time she supported a conference motion that declared zionism should be treated as a form of racism.

== Death threats ==
Yaqoob has received death threats from Islamist and far right extremists.

In 2005, she faced harassment and death threats from al Ghurabaa, an extremist Islamist group later banned under the Terrorism Act 2006. Al-Ghurabaa claimed that it is apostasy for Muslims to participate in Western elections, and its members defaced her election posters with the word "Kafir". Yaqoob believed she was being targeted for being a Muslim woman in the public eye and for working with churches and synagogues.

In August 2009, Birmingham man Stuart Collins appeared in court charged with threatening to kill Yaqoob and with racially and religiously aggravated harassment.

In 2013, she was threatened with having her throat cut in an online article which talked about "smashing Pakistani people, taking a nail bomb into a Mosque and rioting in Birmingham" and said: "If that Salma Yaqeubs [sic] there, cut her f*****g throat. [sic]"

== Personal life ==
Yaqoob married Aqil Chaudary, a GP, in 1995; they have three sons. Her second husband since 2016 is Waqar Azmi, chairman of the Remembering Srebrenica charity. Her family are supporters of Arsenal F.C.

== Recognition ==
In 2006, Yaqoob received the Lloyds TSB Asian Jewel Award for Public Service Excellence, while Harper's Bazaar magazine named her in the top thirty list of British women, alongside Kate Winslet, all of whom they considered to be 'women shaping Britain'.

In 2008, she was voted to eleventh place in the Birmingham Post's Power 50 list of the most influential people in the city. She was included in the newspaper's list again in 2009. It called her "a doughty fighter for inner city areas". During this year, she was also included in The Daily Telegraph's annual list of 'Top 100 left wingers'.

In 2009, Yaqoob was included in the Muslim Women Power List run by the Equality and Human Rights Commission in association with The Times and Emel magazine.

In 2010, The Guardian newspaper said Yaqoob was "the most prominent Muslim woman in British public life".

In January 2015, she was awarded an Honorary Doctorate from Birmingham City University.

== See also ==
- List of British Pakistanis

== Sources ==
- Solidarity in Practice, Salma Yaqoob (p. 60, Stop the War: The story of Britain's biggest mass movement, Andrew Murray and Lindsey German, ISBN 1-905192-00-2)

Party political offices
Preceded by Linda Smith	Leader of the Respect Party; 2005–2012	Succeeded by Arshad Ali
