= Bradford West =

Parliamentary constituency in the United Kingdom, 1885–1918 & 1955 onwards

Coordinates: 53.8°N 1.79°W

- Borough constituency for the House of Commons
- Boundaries since 2010
- Boundary of Bradford West in Yorkshire and the Humber
- County: West Yorkshire
- Population: 114,761 (2011 census)
- Electorate: 71,585 (December 2019)
- Major settlements: Bradford

Current constituency
- Created: 1955
- Member of Parliament: Naz Shah (Labour Party)
- Created from: Bradford Central; Bradford North; Bradford South

1885–1918
- Seats: One
- Type of constituency: Borough constituency
- Created from: Bradford
- Replaced by: Bradford Central; Bradford North; Bradford South

Bradford West is a constituency (Note: A borough constituency (for the purposes of election expenses and type of returning officer)) in West Yorkshire represented in the House of Commons of the UK Parliament since 2015 by Naz Shah of the Labour Party. (Note: As with all constituencies, the constituency elects one Member of Parliament (MP) by the first past the post system of election at least every five years.)

== Constituency profile ==
The Bradford West constituency is located within the City of Bradford metropolitan borough in the county of West Yorkshire. It contains Bradford city centre and the neighbourhoods to its west, including Manningham, Allerton, Clayton and the outlying village of Thornton. The area has an industrial heritage; Bradford was once a global centre for textile manufacturing, particularly in the wool trade. Like much of post-industrial Northern England, Bradford has experienced economic decline with the decrease in importance of the textile industry.

Compared to national averages, residents of the constituency are young and have low levels of income, education and professional employment. The area is highly deprived; Ministry of Housing, Communities and Local Government data ranks Bradford West as the third most deprived constituency in England. Bradford's Pakistani community is concentrated in this area of the city; a majority of the constituency's residents are of Pakistani origin and 61% in total are Asian. Like the rest of Bradford, wards in the constituency are represented by Labour Party or independent councillors at the local district council. An estimated 51% of voters in the constituency supported remaining in the European Union in the 2016 referendum, marginally higher than the national figure of 48%.

== History ==
The constituency was originally created in 1885, but was abolished in 1918. For the 1955 general election the constituency was recreated, following a boundary review.

Since its recreation in 1955, Labour and Conservative Parties held the seat marginally in various years up to 1974, since which time the Labour Party always won the seat, with the exception of the 2012 Bradford West by-election. In 1981, however, Edward Lyons, the sitting Bradford West MP, joined the newly established Social Democratic Party, consequently losing the seat at the 1983 general election.

This seat has a history of political volatility and bucking the national trend. In 1997, the seat was one of only two Labour seats in the country, the other being Bethnal Green and Bow in London, to have seen a swing towards the Conservatives away from Labour. This was attributed to the local party association selecting a Sikh, Marsha Singh to stand when the majority of the seat's population is Muslim. In 2010, however, Singh retained his seat with a swing in his favour, against the national result.

George Galloway of the Respect Party won the seat in the 2012 Bradford West by-election with 55.9% of the votes cast; his 30.9% majority was at the time the largest majority in the history of the modern constituency, but he lost the seat in 2015 to the new Labour candidate Naz Shah by a substantial (28.3%) margin. Despite Galloway's threats to contest the result, he neither launched a legal challenge nor stood again in 2017, in which Shah surpassed his record by winning a majority of 48.1%, the largest margin for a Bradford West MP in any incarnation of the seat. Despite Galloway not standing, his former Respect colleague Salma Yaqoob did stand as an independent, garnering 6,345 votes (13.9%), not far behind the second-placed Conservative candidate.

At the 2019 general election Shah increased her vote share by 11.5%. This was easily the highest increase in the Labour Party's vote share in any constituency in the United Kingdom, in an election where Labour's vote share decreased in all but 13 constituencies. This means that Bradford West has bucked the national trend thrice, as it also did in 1997 and 2010. Bradford West, during the 2019–24 Parliament, was the safest seat in the region of Yorkshire and the Humber for Labour. In 2024, when the Labour Party won a landslide nationally, the Labour share of the vote dropped dramatically to just 31% of the vote, reducing the Labour majority to 707 votes.

== Boundaries ==
1885–1918: The Municipal Borough of Bradford wards of Allerton, Bolton, Great Horton, Heaton and Manningham.

1955–1974: The County Borough of Bradford wards of Allerton, Great Horton, Heaton, Manningham and Thornton.

1974–1983: The County Borough of Bradford wards of Allerton, Heaton, Little Horton, Manningham, Thornton, and University.

1983–2010: The City of Bradford wards of Clayton, Heaton, Little Horton, Thornton, Toller and University.

2010–present: The City of Bradford wards of City, Clayton and Fairweather Green, Heaton, Manningham, Thornton and Allerton and Toller.

The 2023 Periodic Review of Westminster constituencies left the boundaries unchanged.

== Members of Parliament ==
=== MPs 1885–1918 ===
Election	Member	Party	Notes
1885	Alfred Illingworth	Liberal	Member for Bradford (1880–1885)
1895	Ernest Flower	Conservative	
1906	Fred Jowett	Labour	Contested Bradford East following redistribution
1918	Constituency abolished, split between redrawn Bradford Central and the new seats of Bradford North & Bradford South		

=== MPs since 1955 ===
Election	Member	Party	Notes
Constituency recreated with the majority from Bradford North and Bradford South with part from the abolished Bradford Central
1955	Arthur Tiley	Conservative	
1966	Norman Haseldine	Labour Co-op	
1970	John Wilkinson	Conservative	
Feb 1974	Edward Lyons	Labour	Member for Bradford East (1966–1974)
1981	Edward Lyons	SDP	
1983	Max Madden	Labour	Member for Sowerby (Feb 1974–1979)
1997	Marsha Singh	Labour	
2012 by-election	George Galloway	Respect	Member for Bethnal Green and Bow (2005–2010)
2015	Naz Shah	Labour	
Apr 2016	Naz Shah	Independent	
July 2016	Naz Shah	Labour	

== Election results 2010–present ==
=== Elections in the 2020s ===
General election 2024: Bradford West
Party	Candidate	Votes	%	±%
Labour	Naz Shah	11,724	31.6	–44.6
Independent	Muhammed Islam	11,017	29.7	N/A
Green	Khalid Mahmood	3,690	10.0	+8.2
Independent	Akeel Hussain	3,547	9.6	N/A
Conservative	Nigel Moxon	3,055	8.2	−7.0
Reform	Jamie Hinton-Wardle	2,958	8.0	+4.5
Liberal Democrats	Imad Uddin Ahmed	756	2.0	–1.0
Independent	Umar Ghafoor	334	0.9	N/A
Majority		707	1.9	–59.1
Turnout		37,081	47.6	–14.5
Registered electors		77,897		
Labour hold		Swing		

=== Elections in the 2010s ===
General election 2019: Bradford West
Party	Candidate	Votes	%	±%
Labour	Naz Shah	33,736	76.2	+11.5
Conservative	Mohammed Afzal	6,717	15.2	–1.4
Brexit Party	Derrick Hodgson	1,556	3.5	N/A
Liberal Democrats	Mark Christie	1,349	3.0	+1.5
Green	Darren Parkinson	813	1.8	+0.8
Independent	Azfar Bukhari	90	0.2	N/A
Majority		27,019	61.0	+12.9
Turnout		44,261	62.6	–4.8
Registered electors		70,694		
Labour hold		Swing	+6.5	

General election 2017: Bradford West
Party	Candidate	Votes	%	±%
Labour	Naz Shah	29,444	64.7	+15.1
Conservative	George Grant	7,542	16.6	+1.3
Independent	Salma Yaqoob	6,345	13.9	N/A
UKIP	Derrick Hodgson	885	1.9	−5.8
Liberal Democrats	Alun Griffiths	712	1.6	−1.3
Green	Celia Hickson	481	1.1	−1.6
Independent	Hussain Khadim	65	0.1	N/A
Independent	Muhammad Hijazi	54	0.1	N/A
Majority		21,902	48.1	+19.7
Turnout		45,528	67.4	+3.8
Registered electors		67,568		
Labour hold		Swing		

General election 2015: Bradford West
Party	Candidate	Votes	%	±%
Labour	Naz Shah	19,977	49.6	+4.3
Respect	George Galloway	8,557	21.2	+18.1
Conservative	George Grant	6,160	15.3	−15.8
UKIP	Harry Boota	3,140	7.8	+5.8
Liberal Democrats	Alun Griffiths	1,173	2.9	−8.8
Green	Celia Hickson	1,085	2.7	+0.4
Independent	James Kirkcaldy	100	0.2	N/A
English Democrat	Thérèse Hirst	98	0.2	N/A
Majority		11,420	28.4	+14.2
Turnout		40,290	63.6	+13.6
Registered electors		63,371		
Labour hold		Swing		

2012 Bradford West by-election
Party	Candidate	Votes	%	±%
Respect	George Galloway	18,341	55.9	+52.8
Labour	Imran Hussain	8,201	25.0	−20.3
Conservative	Jackie Whiteley	2,746	8.4	−22.7
Liberal Democrats	Jeanette Sunderland	1,505	4.6	−7.1
UKIP	Sonja McNally	1,085	3.3	+1.3
Green	Dawud Islam	481	1.5	−0.8
Democratic Nationalists	Neil Craig	344	1.0	−0.1
Monster Raving Loony	Howling Laud Hope	111	0.3	N/A
Majority		10,140	30.9	
Turnout		32,814	50.0	−14.9
Registered electors		64,618		
Respect gain from Labour		Swing	+36.6	

General election 2010: Bradford West
Party	Candidate	Votes	%	±%
Labour	Marsha Singh	18,401	45.3	+5.6
Conservative	Zahid Iqbal	12,638	31.1	−0.2
Liberal Democrats	David Hall-Matthews	4,732	11.7	−7.4
BNP	Jenny Sampson	1,370	3.4	−3.5
Respect	Arshad Ali	1,245	3.1	N/A
Green	David Ford	940	2.3	−0.7
UKIP	Jason Smith	812	2.0	N/A
Democratic Nationalists	Neil Craig	438	1.1	N/A
Majority		5,763	14.2	+5.8
Turnout		40,576	64.9	+10.9
Registered electors		62,519		–2,761
Labour hold		Swing	+2.9	

2005 notional result
Party	Vote	%
Labour	14,524	39.7
Conservative	11,474	31.4
Liberal Democrats	6,967	19.0
BNP	2,525	6.9
Green	1,093	3.0
Turnout	36,583	56.0
Electorate	65,280	

== Election results 1983–2005 ==
=== Elections in the 2000s ===
General election 2005: Bradford West
Party	Candidate	Votes	%	±%
Labour	Marsha Singh	14,570	40.1	−7.9
Conservative	Haroon Rashid	11,544	31.7	−5.4
Liberal Democrats	Mukhtar Ali	6,620	18.2	+11.8
BNP	Paul Cromie	2,525	6.9	N/A
Green	Parvez Darr	1,110	3.1	−3.9
Majority		3,026	8.4	–2.5
Turnout		36,369	54.0	+0.4
Registered electors		67,356		
Labour hold		Swing	–1.2	

General election 2001: Bradford West
Party	Candidate	Votes	%	±%
Labour	Marsha Singh	18,401	48.0	+6.4
Conservative	Mohammed Riaz	14,236	37.1	+4.1
Green	John Robinson	2,672	7.0	+5.1
Liberal Democrats	Abdul Khan	2,437	6.4	−8.4
UKIP	Imran Hussain	427	1.1	N/A
Asian League	Farhan Khokhar	197	0.5	N/A
Majority		4,165	10.9	+2.3
Turnout		38,370	53.6	−9.7
Registered electors		71,620		
Labour hold		Swing	+1.2	

=== Elections in the 1990s ===
General election 1997: Bradford West
Party	Candidate	Votes	%	±%
Labour	Marsha Singh	18,932	41.6	−11.6
Conservative	Mohammed Riaz	15,055	33.0	−0.8
Liberal Democrats	Helen Wright	6,737	14.8	+4.0
Socialist Labour	Abdul Khan	1,551	3.4	N/A
Referendum	Christopher Royston	1,348	3.0	N/A
Green	John Robinson	861	1.9	N/A
BNP	Gary Osborn	839	1.8	N/A
Socialist	Sajjad Shah	245	0.5	N/A
Majority		3,877	8.6	–10.8
Turnout		45,568	63.3	–6.6
Registered electors		71,961		
Labour hold		Swing	–5.4	

General election 1992: Bradford West
Party	Candidate	Votes	%	±%
Labour	Max Madden	26,046	53.2	+1.3
Conservative	Andrew Ashworth	16,544	33.8	–2.9
Liberal Democrats	Alun Griffiths	5,150	10.5	–0.9
Independent	Peter Braham	735	1.5	N/A
Islamic Party	David Pidcock	471	1.0	N/A
Majority		9,502	19.4	+4.2
Turnout		48,946	69.9	–0.3
Registered electors		70,016		
Labour hold		Swing	+2.1	

=== Elections in the 1980s ===
General election 1987: Bradford West
Party	Candidate	Votes	%	±%
Labour	Max Madden	25,775	51.9	+12.2
Conservative	Iain Duncan Smith	18,224	36.7	+3.8
SDP	Manzoor Moghal	5,657	11.4	–15.7
Majority		7,551	15.2	+8.4
Turnout		49,656	70.2	+1.3
Registered electors		70,763		
Labour hold		Swing	+4.2	

General election 1983: Bradford West
Party	Candidate	Votes	%	±%
Labour	Max Madden	19,499	39.7	–13.4
Conservative	Stephen Day	16,162	32.9	–4.1
SDP	Edward Lyons	13,301	27.1	+18.5
Workers Revolutionary	B. Slaughter	139	0.3	N/A
Majority		3,337	6.8	–9.3
Turnout		49,101	68.9	
Registered electors		71,296		
Labour hold		Swing	–4.7	

1979 notional result
Party	Vote	%
Labour	25,972	53.1
Conservative	18,085	37.0
Liberal	4,199	8.6
Others	662	1.4
Turnout	48,918	
Electorate		

== Election results 1974–1983 ==
=== Elections in the 1970s ===
General election 1979: Bradford West
Party	Candidate	Votes	%	±%
Labour	Edward Lyons	24,309	53.8	+5.3
Conservative	Thomas Stow	16,554	36.7	–0.5
Liberal	Nicholas Flood	3,668	8.1	–5.4
National Front	G. Brown	633	1.4	New
Majority		7,755	17.2	+5.8
Turnout		45,164	69.1	–0.4
Registered electors		65,407		+2,723
Labour hold		Swing	+2.9	

General election October 1974: Bradford West
Party	Candidate	Votes	%	±%
Labour	Edward Lyons	21,133	48.5	+5.2
Conservative	John Wilkinson	16,192	37.2	–1.6
Liberal	S. Harris	5,884	13.5	–1.5
More Prosperous Britain	Harold Smith	339	0.8	New
Majority		4,941	11.3	+6.7
Turnout		43,548	69.5	–7.6
Registered electors		62,684		+527
Labour hold		Swing	+3.4	

General election February 1974: Bradford West
Party	Candidate	Votes	%	±%
Labour	Edward Lyons	20,787	43.4	–9.9
Conservative	John Wilkinson	18,568	38.7	–8.0
Liberal	Roderick Taylor	7,216	15.1	New
Anti-Immigration	Jim Merrick	1,164	2.4	New
Independent Democratic Alliance	Ralph Herbert	200	0.4	New
Majority		2,219	4.6	–1.9
Turnout		47,935	77.1	+5.8
Registered electors		62,157		–4,444
Labour hold		Swing	–0.9	

1970 notional result
Party	Vote	%
Labour	25,300	53.3
Conservative	22,200	46.7
Turnout	47,500	71.3
Electorate	66,601	

== Election results 1955–1974 ==
=== Elections in the 1970s ===
General election 1970: Bradford West
Party	Candidate	Votes	%	±%
Conservative	John Wilkinson	20,475	52.0	+4.0
Labour	Norman Haseldine	18,936	48.0	–4.0
Majority		1,539	3.9	–0.1
Turnout		39,411	73.8	–2.8
Registered electors		53,371		+3,931
Conservative gain from Labour		Swing	+4.0	

=== Elections in the 1960s ===
General election 1966: Bradford West
Party	Candidate	Votes	%	±%
Labour Co-op	Norman Haseldine	19,704	52.0	+6.0
Conservative (National Liberal)	Arthur Tiley	18,170	48.0	–6.0
Majority		1,534	4.1	N/a
Turnout		37,874	76.6	–0.2
Registered electors		49,440		–1,472
Labour Co-op gain from Conservative		Swing	+6.0	

General election 1964: Bradford West
Party	Candidate	Votes	%	±%
Conservative (National Liberal)	Arthur Tiley	21,121	54.0	–2.2
Labour Co-op	Norman Haseldine	17,974	46.0	+2.2
Majority		3,147	8.1	–4.4
Turnout		39,098	76.8	–5.0
Registered electors		50,912		+868
Conservative hold		Swing	–2.2	

=== Elections in the 1950s ===
General election 1959: Bradford West
Party	Candidate	Votes	%	±%
Conservative (National Liberal)	Arthur Tiley	23,012	56.2	+2.4
Labour	Sydney Hyam	17,906	43.8	–2.4
Majority		5,106	12.4	+4.9
Turnout		40,918	81.8	+0.0
Registered electors		50,044		–682
Conservative hold		Swing	+2.4	

General election 1955: Bradford West
Party	Candidate	Votes	%
Conservative (National Liberal)	Arthur Tiley	22,306	53.8
Labour Co-op	Muriel Ferguson	19,147	46.2
Majority		3,159	7.6
Turnout		41,453	81.7
Registered electors		50,726	
Conservative win (new seat)			

== Election results 1885–1918 ==
=== Elections in the 1910s ===
General election December 1910: Bradford West
Party	Candidate	Votes	%	±%
Labour	Fred Jowett	7,729	64.0	−2.6
Conservative	Ernest Flower	4,339	36.0	+2.6
Majority		3,390	28.0	–5.2
Turnout		12,068	81.4	−8.6
Registered electors				
Labour hold		Swing	+2.6	

General election January 1910: Bradford West
Party	Candidate	Votes	%	±%
Labour	Fred Jowett	8,880	66.6	+27.5
Conservative	Ernest Flower	4,461	33.4	+0.7
Majority		4,419	33.2	+26.8
Turnout		13,341	90.0	−0.8
Registered electors				
Labour hold		Swing	+13.4	

=== Elections in the 1900s ===
General election 1906: Bradford West
Party	Candidate	Votes	%	±%
Labour	Fred Jowett	4,957	39.1	−10.7
Conservative	Ernest Flower	4,147	32.7	−17.5
Liberal	William Claridge	3,580	28.2	New
Majority		810	6.4	N/a
Turnout		12,684	90.8	+10.3
Registered electors				
Labour gain from Conservative		Swing		

General election 1900: Bradford West
Party	Candidate	Votes	%	±%
Conservative	Ernest Flower	4,990	50.2	+9.5
Labour	Fred Jowett	4,949	49.8	New
Majority		41	0.4	–4.4
Turnout		9,939	80.5	−5.8
Registered electors				
Conservative hold		Swing	+14.1	

=== Elections in the 1890s ===
General election 1895: Bradford West
Party	Candidate	Votes	%	±%
Conservative	Ernest Flower	3,936	40.7	+7.2
Liberal	John Horsfall	3,471	35.9	−0.4
Ind. Labour Party	Ben Tillett	2,264	23.4	−6.8
Majority		465	4.8	
Turnout		9,671	86.3	+2.8
Registered electors				
Conservative gain from Liberal		Swing	+3.8	

General election 1892: Bradford West
Party	Candidate	Votes	%	±%
Liberal	Alfred Illingworth	3,306	36.3	−23.9
Conservative	Ernest Flower	3,053	33.5	–6.3
Bradford Labour Union	Ben Tillett	2,749	30.2	New
Majority		253	2.8	–13.0
Turnout		9,108	83.5	+13.5
Registered electors				
Liberal hold		Swing	–	

=== Elections in the 1880s ===
General election 1886: Bradford West
Party	Candidate	Votes	%	±%
Liberal	Alfred Illingworth	3,975	60.2	+2.3
Liberal Unionist (Conservative)	Archibald William Stirling	2,623	39.8	–2.3
Majority		1,352	20.4	+4.6
Turnout		6,598	70.0	−15.9
Registered electors				
Liberal hold		Swing	+2.3	

General election 1885: Bradford West
Party	Candidate	Votes	%
Liberal	Alfred Illingworth	4,688	57.9
Conservative	Henry Byron Reed	3,408	42.1
Majority		1,280	15.8
Turnout		8,096	85.9
Registered electors			
Liberal win (new seat)			

== See also ==
- List of parliamentary constituencies in West Yorkshire
- List of parliamentary constituencies in the Yorkshire and the Humber (region)
