= Arshad Ali (British politician) =

British politician and activist

Arshad Ali is a British psychologist, political activist and politician who was the leader of the Respect Party from November 2012 until December 2012, when he was forced to resign after evidence of a prior conviction for election fraud came to light.

Ali was a longstanding Respect campaigner, having contested on council elections in Bradford's Manningham ward in 2007 and in the general election in 2010. He tried and failed to win Bradford West, the constituency taken by George Galloway in 2012 in a landslide victory.

== Biography ==
Ali's election as Chair-elect of the Respect Party was announced by Respect Party national secretary Chris Chilvers on 5 November 2012. Ali stood down as the national chair in December 2012 after it emerged he had a spent conviction for electoral fraud. In 1997, Ali was in jail for six weeks following his conviction for electoral fraud.

Later, he stood for election to a City Council seat as a Respect Party candidate in Bradford in 2014, but failed.

Party political offices
Preceded by Salma Yaqoob	Leader of the Respect Party; 2012	Succeeded by George Galloway
