= Arthur Tiley =

British politician

- Arthur Tiley by Walter Bird, 1966.

Member of Parliament for Bradford West
- In office 26 May 1955 – 10 March 1966
- Preceded by: Constituency created
- Succeeded by: Norman Haseldine
- Majority: 3159

Personal details
- Born: 17 January 1910 Bradford, England
- Died: 5 June 1994 (aged 84)
- Party: Conservative and National Liberal
- Education: Grange High School, Bradford
- Occupation: Businessman

Arthur Tiley (17 January 1910 – 5 June 1994) was a British businessman and Conservative and National Liberal politician. Upon the re-creation of the Bradford West constituency in 1955, Tiley was elected as its Member of Parliament. He held the seat until his defeat at the 1966 general election by Labour's Norman Haseldine. He was the MP for Bradford during the city's smallpox outbreak in 1962.

== Early life and education ==
Arthur Tiley was born in Bradford on 17 January 1910. He was educated at the Grange High School in Bradford, and is best known as a business professional.

== Career ==
Tiley had a career in business before entering politics. Between 1934 and 1950, he was treasurer of the Young Women's Christian Association in Bradford. From 1939 to 1945, he was senior company officer for the National Fire Service.

He was Conservative and National Liberal politician as he entered the House of Commons in year 1955. Upon the re-creation of the Bradford West constituency in the same year, Tiley was elected as its Member of Parliament. He held the seat until his defeat at the 1966 general election by Labour's Norman Haseldine.

He was the MP for Bradford during the city's smallpox outbreak in 1962. Following the outbreak, his speech in parliament included details of Bradford's losses in its textile trade.

From 1964 to 1966, he was opposition spokesman on Pensions and National Insurance.

His later career focused on his insurance business and involved himself in many charities. Although he was known as a politician, he was a devout Christian, and would like to be remembered as a religious man.

== Personal life ==
In 1936, he married Mary Tankard and they had one son and one daughter. He was appointed a CBE in 1972.

== Death ==
Tiley died on 5 June 1994.

Parliament of the United Kingdom
New constituency	Member of Parliament for Bradford West; 1955–1966	Succeeded by Norman Haseldine
