= Imran Hussain (British politician) =

British politician (born 1978)

Imran Hussain MP
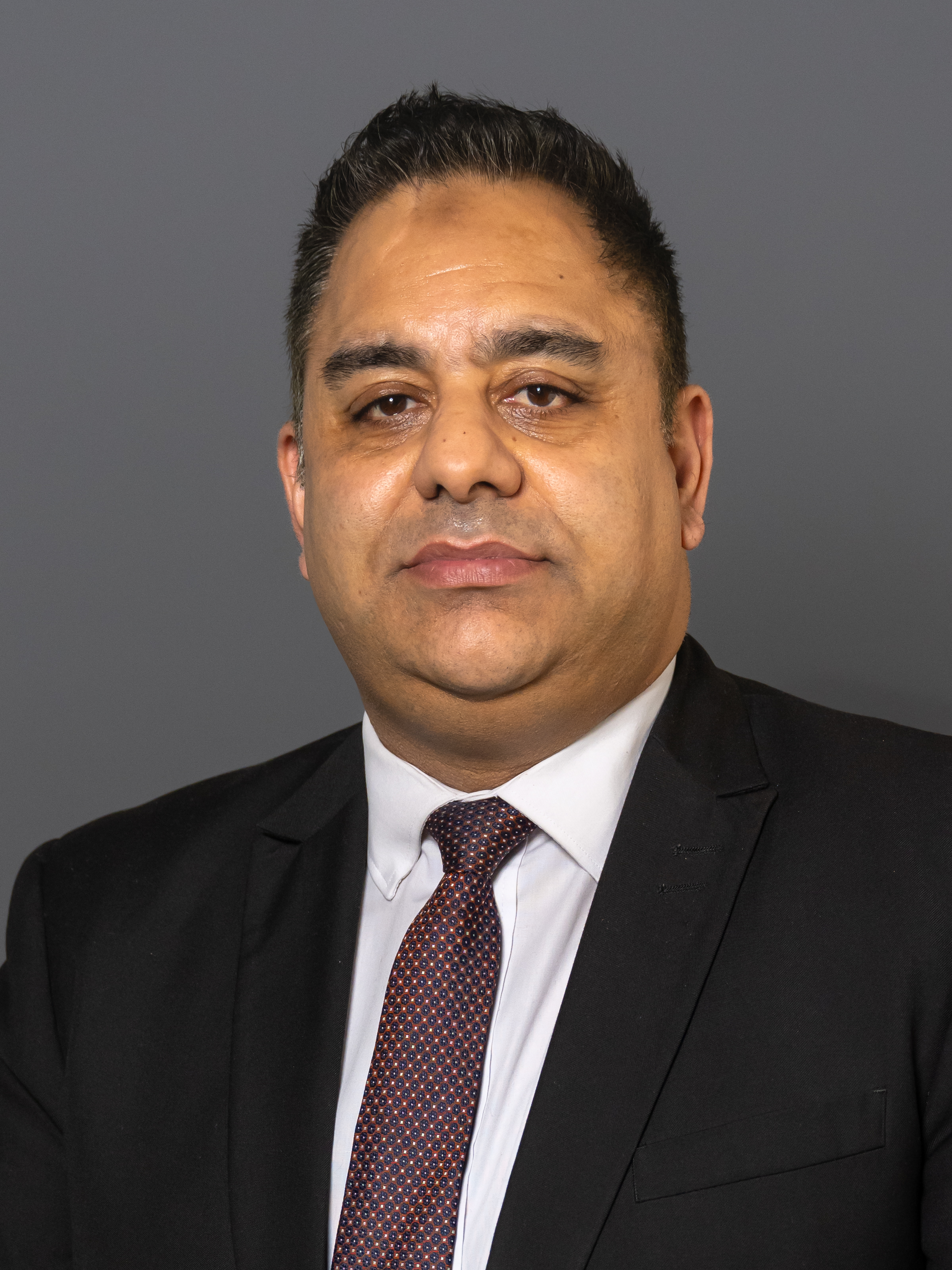
- Official portrait, 2024

Member of Parliament for Bradford East
- Incumbent
- Assumed office 7 May 2015
- Preceded by: David Ward
- Majority: 6,189 (16.6%)
Shadow portfolios
2023	New Deal for Working People
2020–2023	Work
2017–2020	Justice
2016–2017	International Development

Member of Bradford City Council for Toller
- In office 2 May 2002 – 3 May 2018
- Preceded by: Qasim Khan
- Succeeded by: Kamran Hussain

Personal details
- Born: 7 June 1978 (age 48) Bradford, West Yorkshire, England
- Party: Labour
- Other political affiliations: Independent (2024–2025); Socialist Campaign Group
- Education: University of Huddersfield
- Website: Official website

Imran Hussain (born 7 June 1978) is a British Labour politician, and barrister who has been the Member of Parliament (MP) for Bradford East since 2015.

== Early life and career ==
Imran Hussain was born on 7 June 1978 in Bradford, West Yorkshire. He attended local state schools and as a teenager worked in Morrisons, sweeping floors and stacking shelves.

== Political career ==
Hussain was a Labour councillor in the City of Bradford Metropolitan District Council having first been elected in 2002. In 2003, Hussain brought forward a motion to Bradford Council opposing the Coalition Invasion of Iraq.

In 2008, he was elected as Deputy Leader of the council's Labour Group. In 2010, when Labour took control of the council, he became Deputy Leader of Bradford Council and remained in that position for five years until the 2015 general election when he was elected to the House of Commons.

Following his election to Westminster, Hussain rejected his council allowance, which he was entitled to, stating it was a "principled decision" as it would be wrong "to get two salaries" from public office.

== Parliamentary career ==
In March 2012, Hussain was selected by Labour to contest the Bradford West by-election caused by the resignation of the Labour incumbent, Marsha Singh, due to "serious illness". At the election, Hussain came second with 25% of the vote behind the Respect candidate George Galloway.

In 2014, Bradford East Constituency Labour Party opened its parliamentary selection process. In the final selection meeting held on 1 November 2014, Hussain was chosen over three other candidates, including the President of the Trades Union Congress to become Labour's candidate for the seat. During his general election campaign, Hussain rejected a £1,000 donation from Tony Blair citing his own opposition to the Iraq War as the reason.

At the 2015 general election, Hussain was elected to Parliament as MP for Bradford East with 46.6% of the vote and a majority of 7,084. On 15 May 2015, Hussain was one of 10 newly elected Labour MPs who signed an open letter calling for a Leader of the Labour Party who will not "draw back to the ‘New Labour’ creed of the past" and will oppose austerity.

On 20 July 2015, Hussain was one of 48 Labour MPs who voted against the Welfare Bill and therefore rebelled against the Labour Party's position of abstaining on the vote. He described the bill as "cruel and unfair" and said it would be "attacking hard working families, the poorest and children".

Hussain was one of 36 Labour MPs who nominated Jeremy Corbyn as a candidate in the Labour leadership election of 2015. He fully supported Corbyn's leadership campaign. On 14 January 2016, Hussain was appointed Shadow Minister of State for International Development by Jeremy Corbyn.

At the snap 2017 general election, Hussain was re-elected as MP for Bradford East with an increased vote share of 65.4% and an increased majority of 20,540.

On 3 July 2017, he was appointed Shadow Minister of State for Justice.

Hussain was again re-elected at the 2019 general election, with a decreased vote share of 63% and a decreased majority of 18,144.

Hussain nominated Rebecca Long-Bailey as a candidate in the Labour leadership election of 2020 and nominated Richard Burgon for the deputy leadership. On 9 April 2020 he was appointed by Keir Starmer as Shadow Minister of State for Employment Rights. In the 2023 British shadow cabinet reshuffle, he was appointed Shadow Minister for the New Deal for Working People.

On 8 November 2023, Hussain resigned as Shadow Minister because of Starmer's refusal to call for a ceasefire in the Gaza war. Hussain said he wanted to be a "strong advocate for the humanitarian ceasefire" but could not do that as a frontbencher "given its current position".

At the 2024 general election, Hussain was re-elected to Parliament with a decreased vote share of 37.9% and a decreased majority of 6,189.

On 23 July 2024, the whip was suspended from Hussain for six months by the Labour Party, after he voted for a Scottish National Party amendment to scrap the two-child benefit cap. He sat as an independent in Parliament until 5 February 2025, when the whip was restored.

On 9 May 2026, he called on Keir Starmer to resign following the 2026 United Kingdom local elections.

Parliament of the United Kingdom
Preceded by David Ward	Member of Parliament for Bradford East; 2015–present	Incumbent
