= Naz Shah =

British politician (born 1973)

Naz Shah MP
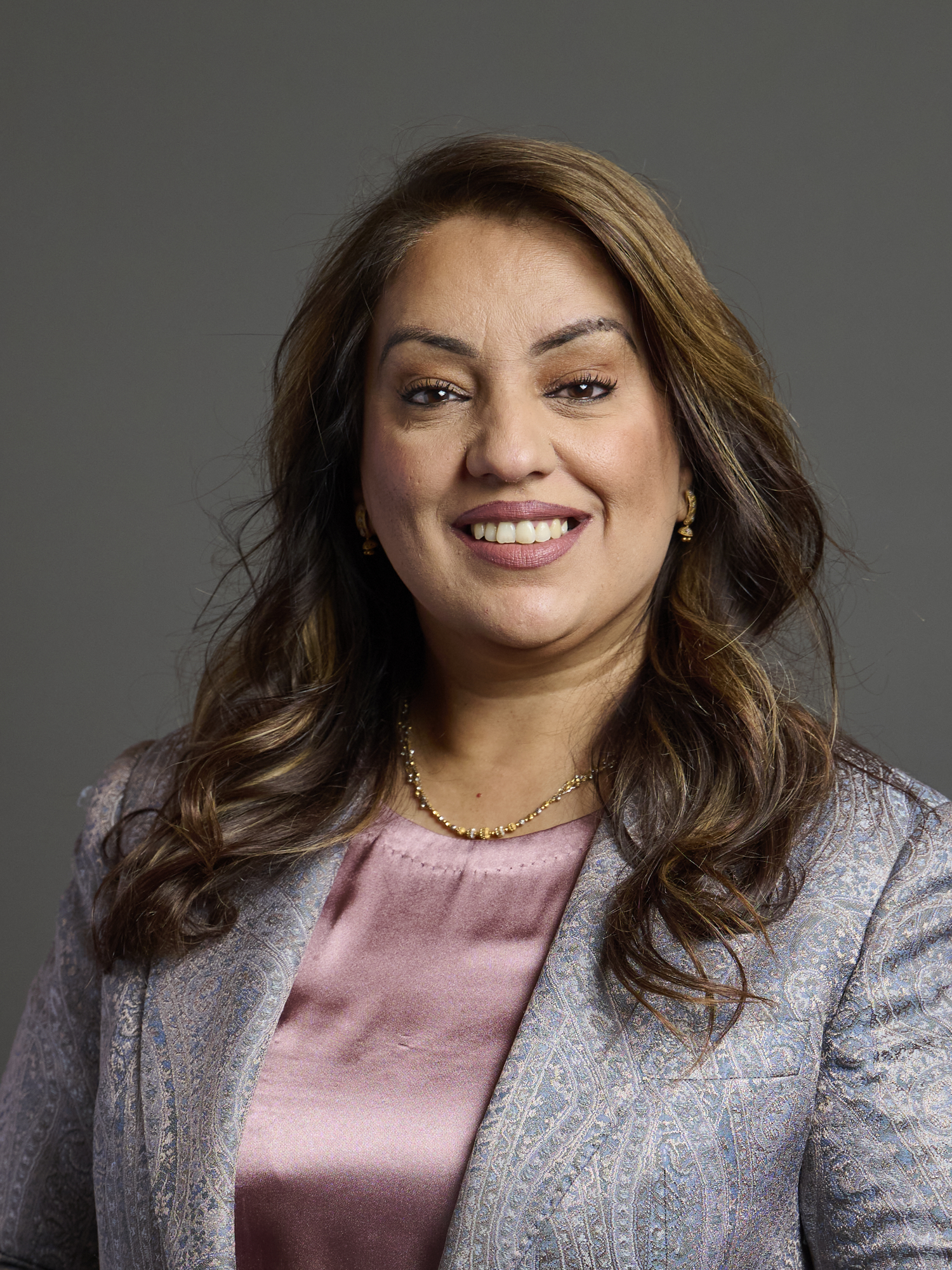
- Official portrait, 2024

Member of Parliament for Bradford West
- Incumbent
- Assumed office 7 May 2015
- Preceded by: George Galloway
- Majority: 707 (1.9%)
Shadow portfolios
2021–2023	Crime Reduction
2020–2021	Community Cohesion
2018–2020	Women and Equalities

Personal details
- Born: Naseem Shah; 13 November 1973 (age 52) Bradford, Yorkshire, England
- Party: Labour
- Website: Official website

Naseem Shah (Urdu: ناز شاہ; born 13 November 1973) is a British Labour Party politician who has been Member of Parliament (MP) for Bradford West since 2015. She served in the Opposition frontbench from 2018 to 2023, most recently as Shadow Minister for Crime Reduction.

== Early life ==
Naseem Shah was born on 13 November 1973 in Bradford. Her father left the family when she was six years old. At age 12, she was sent to Pakistan by her mother, Zoora Shah, to escape her mother's abusive partner, where she had an arranged marriage. When she was 20, her mother, who had been sexually and physically abused by her partner for over a decade, was convicted of his murder and served nearly 14 years in prison.

== Early career ==
Before being elected as an MP, Shah was the chair of mental health charity, Sharing Voices Bradford, and had previously worked as a carer for disabled people, as an NHS Commissioner and a director for a regional association supporting local councils. She voted for George Galloway at the Bradford West by-election in 2012. Working with the Southall Black Sisters, Shah campaigned for her mother's release from prison.

== Parliamentary career ==
In a secret ballot in February 2015 for selection as the Labour Party candidate for Bradford West, Amina Ali won with 142 votes against Shah's 13. However, Ali resigned shortly afterwards citing personal reasons and Shah was chosen as the candidate by the Labour Party National Executive.

=== 1st term (2015–2017) ===
At the 2015 general election, Shah was elected to Parliament as MP for Bradford West with 49.6% of the vote and a majority of 11,420. Shah endorsed Yvette Cooper during the Labour leadership contest in 2015. She was appointed as Parliamentary Private Secretary (PPS) to John McDonnell, the Shadow Chancellor of the Exchequer, in February 2016.

In April 2016, Shah was reported to have reposted in August 2014 a Facebook post with a map from Norman Finkelstein's website showing Israel superimposed on the United States, with the headline "Solution for Israel–Palestine conflict – relocate Israel into United States". She had added the comment that this might "save them some pocket money" (i.e. US funding for Israel). Finkelstein defended the map as humorous. Shah responded that her views on Israel had moderated, and stepped down as John McDonnell's PPS. Jeremy Corbyn condemned her posted comment as "offensive and unacceptable". She was suspended from the Labour Party that month, pending investigation. In July, she was reinstated but given a formal warning for bringing the party into disrepute and told to apologise. Shah said she had shown "ignorance", and said that the post was antisemitic but she was not.

=== 2nd term (2017–2019) ===
At the snap 2017 general election, Shah was re-elected as MP for Bradford West with an increased vote share of 64.7% and an increased majority of 21,902. In August 2017, Shah retweeted and liked a tweet from a 'parody' account claiming to belong to Labour member Owen Jones that read: "Those abused girls in Rotherham and elsewhere just need to shut their mouths. For the good of diversity". Shah deleted the retweet and unliked the original tweet. A spokesperson said: "This was a genuine accident eight days ago that was rectified within minutes." Shah also claimed to have a record on challenging abuse.

In April 2018, following Winnie Madikizela-Mandela's death, Shah paid tribute by tweeting an image incorporating Mandela's quote: "Together, hand in hand, with our matches and our necklaces, we shall liberate this country", a reference to murders using petrol and tyres. She later deleted the tweet. In July 2018, Shah was appointed Shadow Minister of State for Women and Equalities.

=== 3rd term (2019–2024) ===
Shah was again re-elected at the 2019 general election with an increased vote share of 76.2% and an increased majority of 27,019. On 1 October 2020, the pro-Brexit group Leave.EU apologised and paid damages for libel to Shah after they made a social media post which accused her of being a "grooming gangs apologist". In a statement, Leave.EU said that their post was "ill-judged and untrue" and described Shah as a "vociferous campaigner for victims of grooming gangs".

During a 14 June 2021 parliamentary debate on whether to implement two petitions on economic sanctions against Israel and on recognising the State of Palestine, Shah warned the incoming Israeli Prime Minister, Naftali Bennett, that "if any more Palestinian blood is unjustly spilled under a perverted interpretation of a right to self-defence" that she would push for Israel to be tried before the International Criminal Court for war crimes.

=== 4th term (2024–) ===
At the 2024 general election, Shah was again re-elected, with a decreased vote share of 31.6% and a decreased majority of 707, down from just over 27,000 at the previous election. Shah opposed Kim Leadbeater's bill introducing assisted suicide into law and served on the committee examining the legislation.

== Personal life ==
During the early 2010s, Shah was injured in a hit-and-run collision, which has left her with ongoing periodic severe nerve pain which requires hospitalisation.

Parliament of the United Kingdom
Preceded by George Galloway	Member of Parliament for Bradford West; 2015–present	Incumbent
