= Edward Lyons (British politician) =

British politician (1926–2010)

Edward Lyons, QC (17 May 1926 – 23 April 2010) was a British politician.

== Early life ==
Lyons was born in Glasgow and then the family moved to Leeds. He was educated at Roundhay School and Leeds University. Following World War II, he worked as a Russian interpreter in Germany attached to the Control Commission (1946–48). He became a barrister, called to the bar by Lincoln's Inn in 1952.

== Political career ==
Lyons contested Harrogate in 1964, but was elected Labour Party (UK) Member of Parliament for Bradford East in 1966. He served there until the constituency's abolition for the February 1974 general election, and then in Bradford West from February 1974 to 1983.

In 1979 Lyons secured an unusual swing to Labour (against the national trend), almost certainly as a result of heavy support amongst the Asian community angry at Margaret Thatcher's anti-immigrant rhetoric.

In March 1981, Lyons was one of the Labour MPs who defected to the Social Democratic Party. In the 1983 general election, Lyons polled 27% of the vote in Bradford West - and came third behind the new Labour candidate Max Madden.

== Death ==
Lyons died on 23 April 2010 following a long illness.

Parliament of the United Kingdom
Preceded by Frank McLeavy	Member of Parliament for Bradford East; 1966 – February 1974	constituency abolished
Preceded by John Wilkinson	Member of Parliament for Bradford West; February 1974 – 1983	Succeeded by Max Madden
