= John Wilkinson (British politician) =

British politician (1940–2014)

Member of Parliament for Ruislip-Northwood
- In office 3 May 1979 – 11 April 2005
- Preceded by: Petre Crowder
- Succeeded by: Nick Hurd

Member of Parliament for Bradford West
- In office 18 June 1970 – 8 February 1974
- Preceded by: Norman Haseldine
- Succeeded by: Edward Lyons

Personal details
- Born: John Arbuthnot Du Cane Wilkinson; 23 September 1940 Slough, England
- Died: 1 March 2014 (aged 73) Isle of Man
- Party: Conservative
- Education: Eton College
- Alma mater: Churchill College, Cambridge

Military service
- Allegiance: United Kingdom
- Branch/service: Royal Air Force
- Years of service: before 1970

John Arbuthnot Du Cane Wilkinson (23 September 1940 – 1 March 2014) was a British Conservative politician. He was the MP for Bradford West from 1970 to 1974, and for Ruislip-Northwood from 1979 to 2005.

== Early life ==
Wilkinson was born in Slough on 23 September 1940. He was educated at Eton College, the Royal Air Force College Cranwell, and Churchill College, Cambridge.

== Electoral history ==
He was the member of parliament (MP) for Bradford West from 1970 until February 1974, when he was defeated by the Labour candidate Edward Lyons. He failed to regain the seat against Lyons in the following general election that same year.

In the 1979 general election he was elected as MP for Ruislip-Northwood, succeeding Petre Crowder, where he was re-elected in the successive general elections in 1983, 1987, 1992, 1997 and 2001.

Wilkinson did not stand in the May 2005 general election, and the succeeding MP for Ruislip-Northwood was fellow Conservative, Nick Hurd. By the time of his retirement, Wilkinson was one of the longest-serving Conservative MPs, having served 30 years in Parliament.

== Parliamentary career ==
Wilkinson remained on the backbenches for most of his parliamentary career, apart from two brief periods as a Parliamentary private secretary (PPS): to the Minister of State for Industry from 1979 to 1980 and to the Secretary of State for Defence from 1981 to 1982.

A former member of the Royal Air Force (RAF), he spoke frequently in debates on defence and from 1979 to 1990 he was a member of the Parliamentary Assembly of The Western European Union (WEU). He also served as a member of the Parliamentary Assembly of the Council of Europe.

Wilkinson was one of the Maastricht Rebels, from whom the Conservative whip was withdrawn when they voted against legislation to ratify the Maastricht Treaty on European Union. Wilkinson and the other rebels continued to oppose the European policy of Conservative Prime Minister John Major for much of the 1992–97 parliament.

Wilkinson maintained an interest in Ukraine dating back to his tenure as MP for Bradford West, which at the time had a large Ukrainian diaspora community, and he was a longtime advocate for Ukrainian independence and the dissolution of the Soviet Union. In the 1983 book Alternative Approaches to British Defence Policy he argued for greater strengthening of British forces to respond to potential threats by the Eastern Bloc. He was president of the European Freedom Council, a group associated with the Anti-Bolshevik Bloc of Nations, and co-founded the British-Ukrainian All-Party Parliamentary Group following the Declaration of Independence of Ukraine. He publicly expressed support for the Orange Revolution and Ukraine's accession to the European Union.

Wilkinson was additionally a supporter of Kosovar independence, and supported British involvement in the Kosovo War, although he criticised the government of Tony Blair for displaying "weakness" against the government of Yugoslavia in the conflict. He opposed the relocation of Kosovar refugees from the war to Ruislip, saying in May 1999 that the area already had a "very substantial burden".

== Personal life ==
In 1969, Wilkinson married Paula Adey, with whom he had daughter; they divorced in 1987. Later that year, he married Cecilia "Ceci" Cienfuegos, who was from Chile; they had a son.

Wilkinson died on the Isle of Man on 1 March 2014.

Parliament of the United Kingdom
Preceded by Norman Haseldine	Member of Parliament for Bradford West; 1970 – Feb. 1974	Succeeded by Edward Lyons
Preceded by Petre Crowder	Member of Parliament for Ruislip-Northwood; 1979–2005	Succeeded by Nick Hurd
