= Norman Haseldine =

British politician (1922–1998)

(Charles) Norman Haseldine (25 March 1922 – 16 October 1998) was a British Labour Co-operative politician. Born in Sheffield, he served as Member of Parliament for Bradford West from 1966 until his defeat at the 1970 general election by the Conservative candidate John Wilkinson.

He married the former Georgette Elise Michelle Bernard in 1946: their four sons were Michael (born 1947), Gerald (born 1948), Paul (born 1955) and Luke (born 1965).

Parliament of the United Kingdom
Preceded by Arthur Tiley	Member of Parliament for Bradford West; 1966–1970	Succeeded by John Wilkinson
