= Ernest Flower =

British politician

Flower in 1895.

Sir Ernest Francis Swan Flower (24 August 1865 – 30 April 1926) was a British Conservative Party politician.

At the 1895 general election Flower was elected as the Member of Parliament (MP) for Bradford West, winning the seat from the Liberal Party on his second attempt, after unsuccessfully contesting the seat in 1892. He held the seat for 11 years, until his defeat at the 1906 general election. He stood again at both the January 1910 and December 1910 general elections, but lost on both occasions by a large majority.

Flower was a member of the Grand Council of the Primrose League and of the executive committee of the State Children's Aid Association. He was noted for his philanthropy in the East End of London. He was knighted in the New Year Honours, in December 1903.

Flower was chairman of the Blue Cross Fund. He died in 1926, aged 60. He left all of his property to his sister Edith Mary Flower.

Parliament of the United Kingdom
Preceded by Alfred Illingworth	Member of Parliament for Bradford West; 1895 – 1906	Succeeded by Fred Jowett
