= Max Madden =

British journalist and politician (born 1941)

Member of Parliament for Bradford West
- In office 9 June 1983 – 8 April 1997
- Preceded by: Edward Lyons
- Succeeded by: Marsha Singh

Member of Parliament for Sowerby
- In office 28 February 1974 – 7 April 1979
- Preceded by: Douglas Houghton
- Succeeded by: Donald Thompson

Personal details
- Born: Maxwell Francis Madden; 29 October 1941 (age 84)
- Party: Labour

Maxwell Francis Madden (born 29 October 1941) is a British journalist and Labour Party politician.

== Parliamentary career ==
Madden unsuccessfully fought Sudbury and Woodbridge in 1966, coming second.

He was elected as Member of Parliament (MP) for Sowerby at the February 1974 election, which he lost to the Conservatives in 1979.

From 1983 until 1997, he was MP for Bradford West before being deselected and replaced as Labour candidate by Marsha Singh.

Parliament of the United Kingdom
Preceded by Douglas Houghton	Member of Parliament for Sowerby; Feb. 1974–1979	Succeeded by Donald Thompson
Preceded by Edward Lyons	Member of Parliament for Bradford West; 1983–1997	Succeeded by Marsha Singh
