= Waqar Azmi =

British equality adviser

Dr Waqar Azmi OBE

UK Government's former Chief Diversity Adviser and EU Ambassador for Intercultural Dialogue

Personal details
- Born: 1970 (age 55–56) Azamgarh, India
- Spouse: Salma Yaqoob

Waqar Azmi OBE is a British political consultant, civil servant and charity director, listed among the world's 500 most influential Muslims by Georgetown University, as well as the Asian power 100 list of the most influential Asians in the UK and, the Muslim power 100 List of the most influential Muslims in the UK. He was the chief diversity adviser at the UK Cabinet Office from 2004 to 2013 and the EU Ambassador of Intercultural Dialogue from 2008 to 2009. He is the founder and chairman of Remembering Srebrenica.

== Early life and career ==
Waqar Azmi grew up with his family in Azamgarh, Uttar Pradesh, India, and moved to the UK at the age of 13, speaking no English when he arrived. He attended the University of Central Lancashire, graduating in 1993 with a degree in politics and social policy. He later completed a doctorate on a topic related to diversity and equality issues.

In 2001, he became the managing director at the world's largest consultancy firm, TMP Worldwide Advertising and Communications and Monster.com and, chairman of Waterhouse Consulting Group in 2009. Azmi founded the British Federation of Racial Equality Councils in 2001, a UK body of racial equality councils and partnerships representing over 100 councils across England, Scotland and Wales. He also founded the think tank Race Equality West Midlands and the Herefordshire Equality Partnership.

After launching a memorial event for the Srebrenica massacre in London in July 2013 with support from David Cameron's government, he became the chairman of the newly established charity Remembering Srebrenica later that summer.

He has been a patron of the Bosnia and Herzegovina UK Network since 2014.

== Civil service career ==
In October 2004, he was appointed as UK Government's chief talent and diversity adviser at the Cabinet Office under the second Blair ministry. He launched the 10-Point Plan on diversity to drive change across Whitehall and for the first time in the UK, linked diversity performance of each government department to the pay and bonus of Permanent Secretaries. The Times wrote: "Azmi raised eyebrows when he announced that the bonuses of permanent secretaries would be linked to their success in meeting the targets". Britain's only Asian Permanent Secretary, Sir Suma Chakrabarti, and a former Minister, Keith Vaz, welcomed the announcement, saying it would accelerate change in the civil service. But Keith Vaz warned: "I'm quite sure there will be resistance to this".

Azmi's work led each government department to prepare a delivery plan and stepped up the pace of change including advertising for open competition the posts of Permanent Secretaries, Ambassadors and other sensitive and top governmental jobs. The Guardian called Azmi "The Equaliser" and The Times called him "Whitehall's diversity champ." Pat McFadden, the then Cabinet Office Minister said in a speech that Azmi was "doing a hugely important job". Other commentators like Paul Zickel writing in The Times said: "Disability in the Civil Service recently moved out of the shadows and into the mainstream. For me, the key driver was the Civil Service-wide ten-point plan developed by Waqar Azmi".

From 2008 to 2009, he held the post of the EU Ambassador for Intercultural Dialogue at the European Parliament.

He left the Cabinet Office to establish Remembering Srebrenica in 2013 with support from Baroness Warsi.

In 2014, he was appointed to the newly established Foreign Office Advisory Group on Freedom of Religion or Belief, chaired by Baroness Warsi.

== ISIS calls for murder ==
In 2016, ISIS called for the murder of Azmi along with 20 other top Western Muslims leaders including Conservative Party ministers Sajid Javid and Baroness Sayeeda Warsi and Hillary Clinton's advisor Huma Abedin in their 2016 online English-language magazine, Dabiq in an article entitled "Kill the imams of kufr in the west", who, according to ISIS, "directly involve themselves in politics and enforcing the laws of kufr (non-believers)." The article brands Azmi and those on the 'hit list' as "apostate" and urges their murder by encouraging followers in other countries to "wage jihad by himself with the resources available to him (knives, guns, explosives, etc.) to kill the crusaders and other disbelievers and apostates."

== Public inquiries ==
Azmi has been involved in several public inquiries in the UK. He was also on the 2001 Oldham riots inquiry which was set up to investigate the riots that occurred in May 2001. He was an open critic of the inquiry, claiming that under government pressure the Inquiry was steered towards language and citizenship, instead of structural inequalities and the growing influence of far-right groups such as the British National Party (BNP).

== Awards, nominations and honorary degrees ==
In 2025 Waqar Azmi received the Presidential Award for Extraordinary Service to Srebrenica Genocide Remembrance and Combating Hatred by President Željko Komšić, Chairman of the Presidency of Bosnia and Herzegovina and in 2002 he received an OBE in the Queen's Birthday Honours at the age of 32 by Her Majesty the Queen in recognition of his major contributions in the UK. and in 2003 he was awarded Britain's Young Asian Achievers Award by Lloyds TSB.

In 2001 Azmi was awarded an honorary master's degree by the University of Worcester. In 2006 he was awarded an Honorary Doctor of Letters degree by Southampton Solent University, and later that year, the University of Central Lancashire awarded him an Honorary Fellowship.

In 2017 Azmi received an honorary Doctorate of Philosophy from the University of Bedfordshire and in January 2015, he was nominated for the Spirit of Britain award at the British Muslim Awards.

== Views on extremism ==
The Times of India wrote: "After he had finished delivering an inspiring speech at a career fest last week, Dr Waqar Azmi was almost mobbed by the crowd. It seemed like the Muslim gathering had waited for a long time for someone like him". Speaking to a Muslim audience of 150,000 (Urdu/Hindi: 1.5 lakh people) in Mumbai, he "slammed those who killed innocent people in the name of Islam. Evil has taken over the hearts of those who maim innocent children, blow up houses and kill people. It is our duty to help purify those dirty hearts," he said. A section of Muslims had gone astray as they had left the Prophet's message behind, he said. "We must illuminate the hearts of those misguided."

Azmi sees globalisation as an opportunity for greater integration and understanding. He cites the Prophet's choices in the initial days of Islam: "He could have tried to destroy all non-Muslims in Medina; commanded everyone to become a Muslim; or chosen the path of integration. He chose the last option and invited everyone, including Jews and Christians, to the society he formed. The problem surfaces when, instead of integration, Muslims want to colonise. They want to create a separate society."

Azmi also believes that Muslims themselves are largely responsible for the problems and challenges that exists in their communities due to a lack of education, activism and effective leadership: "Muslims have become reactionary rather than responding forces," he says. "Reaction leads to friction and destruction while responding paves the way for reconciliation and peace. When controversies erupt over cartoons or films on the Prophet, I tell Muslims there is no image of the Prophet. So any cartoon or film depicting him will be fake. Why fight over a fake depiction? When Muslims react violently, they play into the hands of forces that want to incite the community and paint it as reactionary".

== Personal life ==
He married Salma Yaqoob in 2016.
