= Marsha Singh =

British politician (1954–2012)

Member of Parliament for Bradford West
- In office 1 May 1997 – 2 March 2012
- Preceded by: Max Madden
- Succeeded by: George Galloway

Personal details
- Born: 11 October 1954 Punjab, India
- Died: 17 July 2012 (aged 57) Dominican Republic
- Party: Labour
- Children: 2
- Education: Loughborough University

Marsha Singh (11 October 1954 – 17 July 2012) was a British Labour Party politician, and the member of parliament (MP) for Bradford West from 1997 to 2012. Singh stood down due to ill health.

Singh had a degree in Languages, Politics and Economics of Modern Europe from Loughborough University. He was part of the Directorate of Education for Bradford City Council from 1983 to 1990 and worked for the Bradford Community Health Trust from 1990 to 1997. Singh originally lived in the Manningham Ward of the area, and later moved to Allerton.

At the 2010 general election, Singh managed to increase his majority by 5% with nearly 6,000 votes more than the second placed Zahid Iqbal, despite the Bradford West constituency being a Tory target. Singh managed a 14% majority over the Conservatives, even larger than that he had achieved when first elected in Labour's 1997 landslide election victory.

On 29 February 2012, he announced his intention to retire owing to ill health. He officially vacated his seat by becoming Steward of the Chiltern Hundreds on 2 March 2012. A by-election in the constituency was held on 29 March 2012 and the seat was a gain for George Galloway of the Respect Party, who benefitted from a huge swing against the Labour Party.

Singh was married with two children and four grandchildren. He died four months after resigning, while on holiday in the Dominican Republic.

Parliament of the United Kingdom
Preceded by Max Madden	Member of Parliament for Bradford West; 1997 – 2012	Succeeded by George Galloway
