= 2012 Bradford West by-election =

Election in Bradford West

- 29 March 2012

Bradford West constituency
- Turnout: 50.8% (▼14.7 pp)
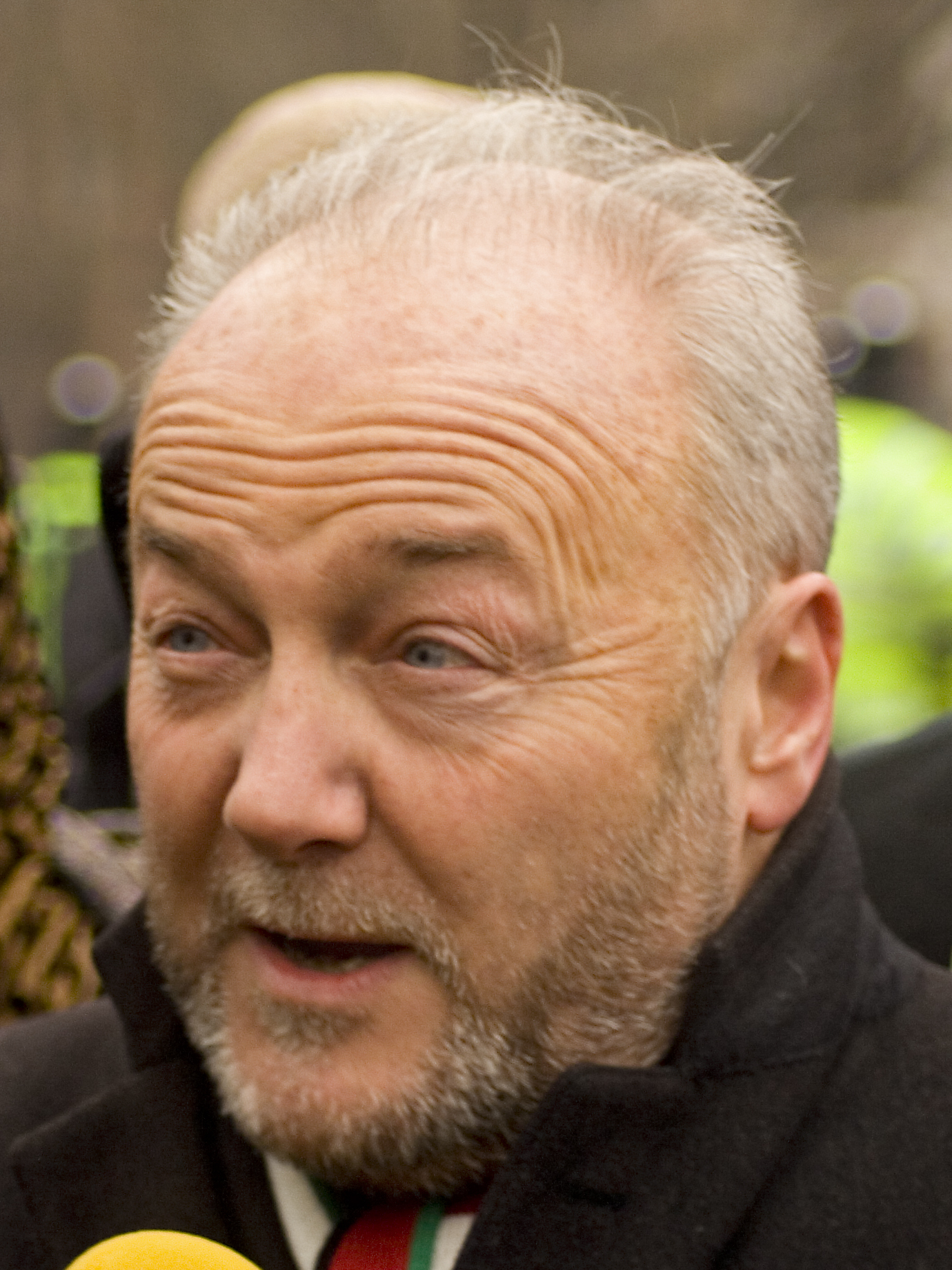

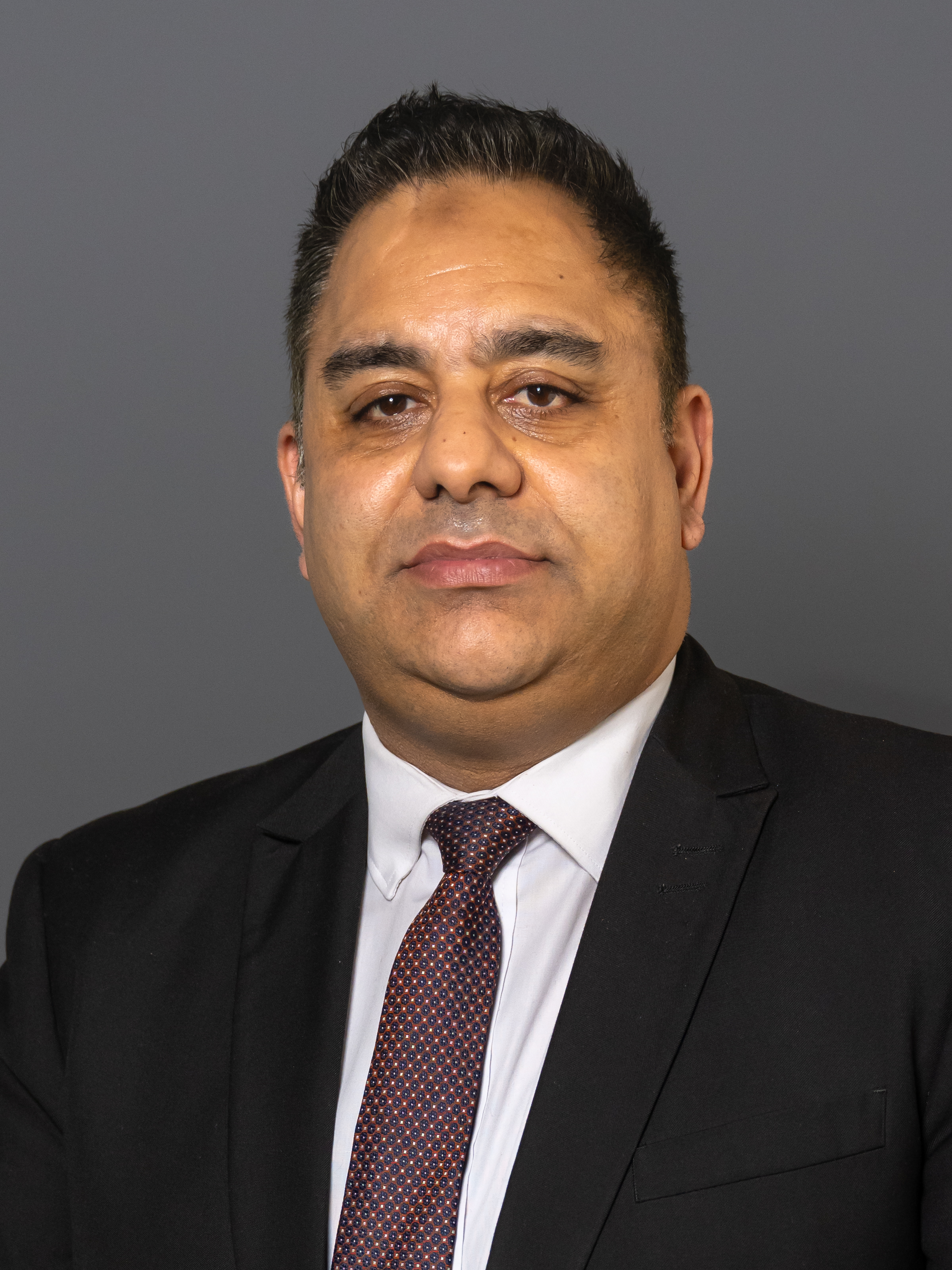

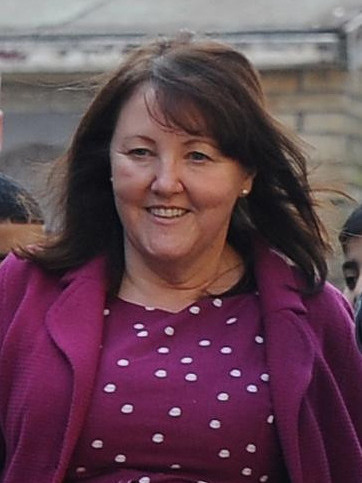
	First party	Second party	Third party
Candidate	George Galloway	Imran Hussain	Jackie Whiteley
Party	Respect	Labour	Conservative
Popular vote	18,341	8,201	2,746
Percentage	55.9%	25.0%	8.4%
Swing	▲52.8 pp	▼20.3 pp	▼22.7 pp
MP before election
Marsha Singh
Labour
Subsequent MP
George Galloway
Respect

A by-election for the United Kingdom parliamentary constituency of Bradford West was held on 29 March 2012, following the resignation of incumbent Labour Party MP Marsha Singh on health grounds. It was won by George Galloway of the Respect Party in what was considered a major upset, defeating Labour candidate Imran Hussain.

Galloway referred to the result as the "Bradford Spring", saying it was Bradford's "peaceful democratic uprising" version of the riots which swept through England in August 2011. Respect's increase in its share of the vote, 52.8%, was the second-highest in recorded British parliamentary by-election history.

== Background ==
=== Constituency ===
Bradford West covers the western areas of the City of Bradford local government district, including the city centre. Suburbs include Clayton, Heaton, Manningham, Toller, Thornton and Allerton.

=== Trigger ===
On 29 February 2012, the incumbent Member of Parliament for Bradford West, Marsha Singh, announced his intention to resign due to "serious illness"; he died four months later. His most recent contribution in the House of Commons came in October 2009. As MPs cannot officially resign from the House of Commons, Singh was appointed to the role of Steward and Bailiff of the Three Hundreds of Chiltern by the Chancellor of the Exchequer, thus disqualifying him from the House. On 6 March 2012, a motion to issue the writ for the by-election was successfully moved by Shadow Chief Whip Rosie Winterton, setting polling day as 29 March. Nominations closed at 4 pm on Wednesday 14 March.

== Candidates ==
The Statement of Persons Nominated was released by the City of Bradford Council on 15 March. Former MP George Galloway confirmed on 6 March that he would stand on behalf of the Respect Party, and later that day UK Independence Party leader Nigel Farage announced that their candidate was Sonja McNally, a former Green Party council candidate. On 8 March, the Liberal Democrats chose Bradford City councillor Jeanette Sunderland to be their candidate, and the Conservatives chose businesswoman and former Rotherham 2010 general election candidate Jackie Whiteley. Labour chose Imran Hussain, the Deputy Leader of Bradford City Council, to be its candidate on 11 March.

On 9 March, the Green Party announced that their candidate would be Dawud Islam, a former Labour councillor and former Green local election candidate. The candidate for the Official Monster Raving Loony Party, Alan Hope, has contested seats on fourteen occasions, parliamentary elections and by-elections. Hope used the ballot paper description "Monster Raving Loony William Hill Party" as part of a sponsorship deal. A meeting of the Democratic Nationalists held in Burnley confirmed that Neil Craig was standing for the party as he had done at the 2010 general election.

== Result ==
2012 Bradford West by-election
Party	Candidate	Votes	%	±%
Respect	George Galloway	18,341	55.9	+52.8
Labour	Imran Hussain	8,201	25.0	–20.3
Conservative	Jackie Whiteley	2,746	8.4	–22.7
Liberal Democrats	Jeanette Sunderland	1,505	4.6	–7.1
UKIP	Sonja McNally	1,085	3.3	+1.3
Green	Dawud Islam	481	1.5	–0.8
Democratic Nationalists	Neil Craig	344	1.0	–0.1
Monster Raving Loony	Howling Laud Hope	111	0.3	New
Majority		10,140	30.9	N/A
Turnout		32,814	50.8	–14.7
Registered electors		48,958		
Respect gain from Labour		Swing	+52.8	

Galloway's election as MP was unexpected. It was the first occasion that the main opposition party has lost a seat in a by-election since the 2000 Romsey by-election—when the Conservatives lost to the Liberal Democrats—and was also among the largest swings against the incumbent party in the same time period. The result was such a surprise as to cause the Joseph Rowntree Reform Trust to commission a report to study the campaign.

== Campaign ==
Hussain, the Labour candidate, declared that he would not attend any of the hustings with other candidates, concentrating instead on meeting the electorate. Several senior Labour politicians, including Ed Miliband, Dennis Skinner, Yvette Cooper and Ed Balls, visited the constituency to support his campaign.

Galloway's campaign sought to capitalise on discontent with the local Labour Party and tension in the Asian community. He criticised the claimed role of baradari, an Urdu word literally meaning "brotherhood" that denotes a hierarchical system of clan politics, in corrupting the area's local politics, particularly the local Labour Party. He said that baradari was responsible for "second- and third-rate politicians particularly but not exclusively from the Labour Party being elected to the city council on the basis not of ability, not of ideas, not on records of experience but on whether their father came from the same village as someone else's father 50 or 60 years ago". Naweed Hussain, a campaign manager for the former Labour MP Singh over the previous three general elections, defected and became a campaign manager for Galloway, complaining that Labour had been "bypassing democracy" in the seat. Imran Hussain dismissed claims of baradari.

The Times correspondent Michael Savage noticed that Galloway referred "heavily to his quasi-Islamic values in his campaign literature. One leaflet proclaimed that 'God KNOWS who is a Muslim and he KNOWS who is not. I, George Galloway, do not drink and never have." Galloway initially said that the photocopied leaflet in question, which did not, as electoral law requires, include the Respect logo, agent's name or address, had not been produced by him. He made similar comments in his campaign rally, saying, "I'm a better Pakistani than he [Mr Hussain] will ever be. God knows who's a Muslim and who is not. And a man that's never out of the pub shouldn't be going around telling people you should vote for him because he's a Muslim." Galloway's election agent subsequently accepted that the leaflet had Galloway's approval. Decca Aitkenhead, in a Guardian interview published near the end of April 2012, wrote: "Contrary to every report I've read, he doesn't deny writing the leaflet himself". The Muslim Public Affairs Committee (MPACUK), which campaigned for Galloway, were involved in promoting the insinuations against Hussain over his reputed drinking of alcohol.

In an article for The Times, the Labour MP Diane Abbott argued that the result was not one of "identity" politics: "If Muslim voters in Bradford West were going to back someone who shared their ethnic identity, they would have voted for the excellent Labour candidate, who happens to be a local Muslim councillor. Furthermore, George won heavily in every ward, including many that were not majority Muslims."

== Aftermath ==
Respect stood a total of 12 candidates in the May 2012 local elections in Bradford, although the party had said they would stand candidates in all 30 wards. Five Respect councillors were elected. The Green candidate Dawud Islam defected to Respect on 3 April 2012, five days after the by-election.

== Previous election result ==
2010 United Kingdom general election: Bradford West
Party	Candidate	Votes	%	±%
Labour	Marsha Singh	18,401	45.3	+5.6
Conservative	Zahid Iqbal	12,638	31.1	−0.2
Liberal Democrats	David Hall-Matthews	4,732	11.7	−7.4
BNP	Jenny Sampson	1,370	3.4	–3.5
Respect	Arshad Ali	1,245	3.1	New
Green	David Ford	940	2.3	−0.7
UKIP	Jason Smith	812	2.0	New
Democratic Nationalists	Neil Craig	438	1.1	New
Majority		5,763	14.2	+5.8
Turnout		40,576	64.9	+8.9
Registered electors				
Labour hold		Swing	+2.9	

== See also ==
- List of United Kingdom by-elections
