= Remembering Srebrenica =

England and Wales-based charitable organisation

Remembering Srebrenica is a UK-based charitable organisation which raises awareness about the Bosnian genocide and educates people about what the UN called "the worst atrocity on European soil since World War Two".

The charity is the sole organiser, in England and Wales, of the annual Srebrenica Memorial Week which culminates in Srebrenica Memorial Day on July 11. Dr Waqar Azmi OBE founded Remembering Srebrenica in 2013 and is Chairman of the charity. The President of the charity is Lord Bourne of Aberystwyth and the Director is Amil Khan.

Remembering Srebrenica is part-funded by the Ministry for Housing, Communities and Local Government and works to build a better, safer, more cohesive society. This is done through ensuring the victims of the genocide are remembered, lessons are learned from the atrocity through educational visits and through community champions who pledge to stand up to hatred and intolerance.

Beyond Srebrenica was formerly called Remembering Srebrenica (Scotland). It is an independent charity operating in Scotland with similar aims and objectives.

== History ==
The initiative arose against the background of "a new enthusiasm for transnational commemoration" of genocide through "learning projects" directed against "the tide of extremists and radicals" in the years following the Stockholm International Forum on the Holocaust in 2000, spearheaded by the United Nations. More immediately, it is thought to have been inspired by the political and financial success of the Lessons from Auschwitz project by the Holocaust Educational Trust.

In January 2009, following an appeal from the Mothers of Srebrenica, the European Parliament adopted a resolution calling "on the Council and the Commission to commemorate appropriately the anniversary of the Srebrenica-Potočari act of genocide by supporting Parliament's recognition of 11 July as the day of commemoration of the Srebrenica genocide all over the EU, and to call on all the countries of the western Balkans to do the same".

In 2013, the charity Remembering Srebrenica was formed in the United Kingdom as a wholly British initiative, led and staffed by politically ambitious second-generation young British Muslim men, mostly of Indian and Pakistani background and with no personal ties to Bosnia. Its foundation was supported by David Cameron's Conservative government, which used the initiative to demonstrate its interest in its own Muslim citizens and improve its relationship with the UK Muslim communities deemed problematic due to the risk of so-called radicalisation leading to terrorism. The charity took upon itself the implementation of the 2009 European Parliament resolution by organising the week-long first British official state remembrance of the massacre in London in July of that year, which included a service at the Westminster Abbey on 6 July 2013 attended by the former High Representative for Bosnia and Herzegovina Lord Ashdown, the Bosniak member of the Presidency of Bosnia and Herzegovina Bakir Izetbegović, and Mothers of Srebrenica's Munira Subašić.

Prime Minister David Cameron pledged £1.2m of government money to support Remembering Srebrenica, with a portion of the funds directed towards sponsoring educational visits of British schoolchildren to Bosnia. The Prime Minister said: "Srebrenica was a stark demonstration of what can happen when hatred, discrimination and evil are allowed to go unchecked. I am pleased that the government has been able to work with Remembering Srebrenica, an initiative dedicated to commemorating and honouring the victims of Srebrenica". On Srebrenica Memorial Day, Prime Minister David Cameron also "met with three survivors of the Srebrenica genocide at Downing Street. The survivors shared their experiences of Srebrenica, and the Prime Minister stressed how important it was that we never forget what happened during this most shameful moment in European history".

In 2014, Foreign Secretary William Hague MP, and the Special Envoy of the UN High Commissioner for Refugees Angelina Jolie during their visit to Srebrenica announced "new UK funding that will enable 750 young people from Britain to visit Srebrenica over the next two years through the Remembering Srebrenica programme, so that the lessons from the Bosnian conflict are never forgotten."

The charity has been prominently involved in coordinating the Holocaust Memorial Day activities since its inception.

== Support ==
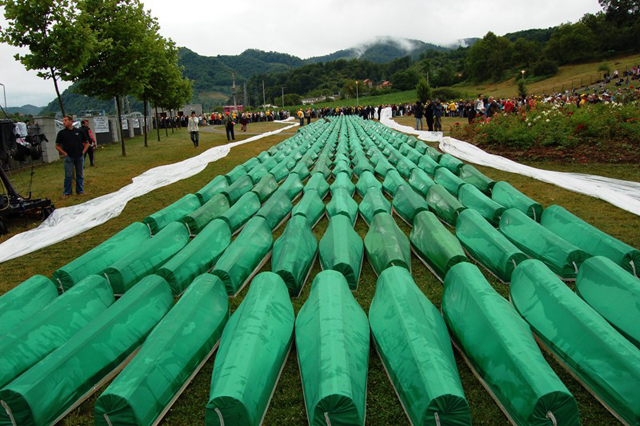
Burial of 775 identified Bosniaks in 2010

Remembering Srebrenica's work has received broad support from numerous high-profile figures, and the charity has been described as "influential". During the commemoration of the 25th anniversary, Prime Minister Boris Johnson said: "There are those who would prefer to forget or deny the enormity of what took place. We must not allow that to happen. We owe it to the victims and to future generations to remember Srebrenica and to ensure it never happens again."

Prince Charles said: "By remembering the pain of the past and learning its lessons, we can together resolve that it must never happen again. This is why the work of organisations such as the United Kingdom’s Remembering Srebrenica is so vitally important and why, 25 years after these terrible crimes were committed, we should stand in determined solidarity with those who have lost so much."

Adama Dieng, former UN Special Adviser on the Prevention of Genocide, said: "Remembering Srebrenica is working to raise awareness on the terrible tragedy and to educate on the consequences of hatred and intolerance. This work is essential everywhere." Cardinal Vincent Nichols said "The programmes of education that organisations like Remembering Srebrenica UK...do [are] just so important."

The charity has received annual funding from the British government since 2013, amounting to £170,000 in the 2013/14 fiscal year, £467,500 in 2014/15, £332,500 in 2015/16, £400,000 per year from 2016/17 to 2020/21, £250,000 in 2021/22, £200,000 in 2022/23, and £150,000 in 2023/24 (for a total of £3.57m over 11 years).

== Boards ==
=== National and regional boards ===
Remembering Srebrenica has eleven national and regional boards across the UK that play a key role in organising and coordinating memorial events in their areas. All the boards are composed of volunteers. Below is a list of these boards and their board chairs:

- Wales, chaired by Abi Carter and Saleem Kidwai OBE
- Northern Ireland, chaired by Peter Osborne
- East Midlands, chaired by Kim Sadique
- East of England, chaired by Dr Helen Connolly
- London & South East, chaired by Rameez Kaleem
- North East, chaired by Lucy Adams and Smajo Bešo
- North West, chaired by Elinor Chohan MBE
- South West, chaired by Dr Louise Livesey
- West Midlands, chaired by Chief Superintendent Mat Shaer
- Yorkshire, chaired by Jo Richmond

Scotland has a separate sister charity Beyond Srebrenica chaired by Sabina Kadic-Mackenzie.

=== Advisory boards ===
Remembering Srebrenica's academic advisory board helps to provide support and guidance related to political, social, historical and educational matters regarding the genocide in Srebrenica and the charity's aims to raise awareness and commemorate the genocide. The board is chaired by Professor Eric Gordy.

The charity's Bosnian Community Advisory Board is composed of members of the British Bosnian community from right across the country, and it advises and supports the work of the charity.

== Activities ==
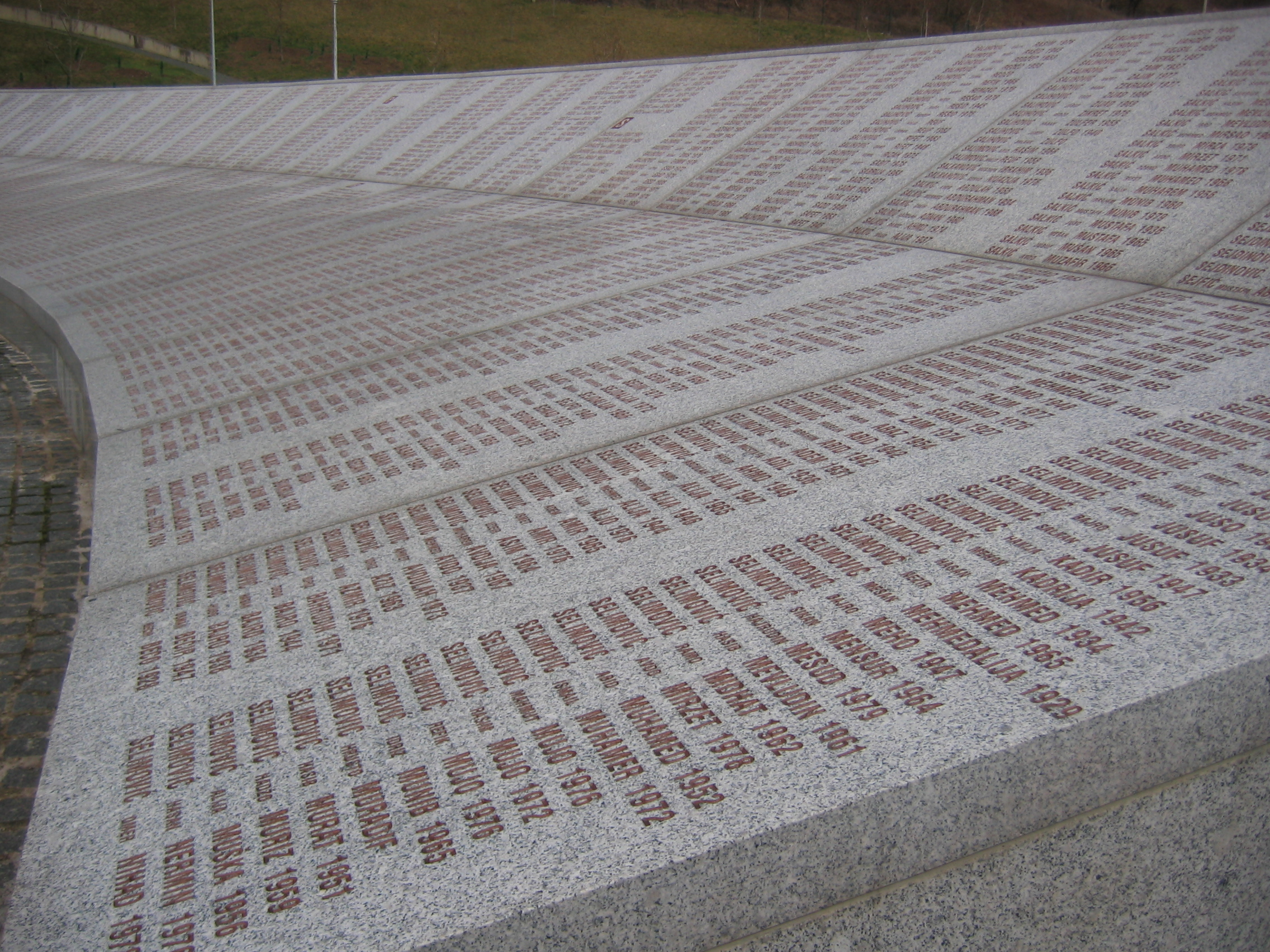
Wall of names at the Srebrenica Genocide Memorial in Potočari

=== Srebrenica Memorial Week ===
Since 2013, Remembering Srebrenica has helped organise nearly 7,500 Srebrenica Memorial events and activities across the UK.

The UK held its first Srebrenica Memorial Day in 2013 to mark the 18th anniversary of the atrocity with survivors, senior politicians and religious leaders paying their respects to the victims at Lancaster House in central London, including Foreign Secretary William Hague, Secretary of State Eric Pickles, Shadow Secretary of State Hilary Benn, Lord Paddy Ashdown and Cardinal Vincent Nichols.

Since 2014, a whole week of memorial events across the UK has been organised each year, with national Srebrenica Memorial events held in London, Cardiff and Edinburgh (and also in Belfast from 2016 onward) that featured survivors, politicians and religious leaders.

The commemorations for Srebrenica Memorial Week have followed specific themes each year since the 20th anniversary in 2015:

- 2015 - Learning the Lessons
- 2016 - 21: Coming of Age
- 2017 - Gender and Genocide
- 2018 - Acts of Courage
- 2019 - Bridging the Divide: Confronting Hate
- 2020 - Every Action Matters
- 2021 - Rebuilding Lives
- 2022 - Combatting Denial: Challenging Hatred

==== Srebrenica Memorial Week 2020 ====
In 2020, due to COVID-19, many planned events to commemorate the 25th anniversary were cancelled, including the national Srebrenica Memorial event due to be held at St Paul's Cathedral. As a result, for the first time ever the UK National Srebrenica Memorial Day Commemoration was held entirely online on the charity's social media channels, and was also broadcast by Al Jazeera, Face TV, Hayat TV and the Islam Channel.

The distinguished speakers who participated in the 25th anniversary ceremony included Prince Charles, Boris Johnson, Angelina Jolie, the President of Bosnia and Herzegovina Šefik Džaferović, the Secretary of State for Housing, Communities and Local Government, Robert Jenrick, Keir Starmer, Leader of the Labour Party, David Cameron, President Bill Clinton, William Hague and Secretary Madeleine Albright, the Grand Mufti of Bosnia and Herzegovina Husein ef. Kavazovic, the Chief Rabbi Ephraim Mirvis, the Archbishop of Westminster, Cardinal Vincent Nichols, and Imam Qari Asim, Chair of the Mosques and Imams National Advisory Board. In addition to the national commemoration event, over 1,700 memorial events and activities took place across the country, organised by faith organisations, local councils, schools and others. In 2020, 151 local authorities in the UK commemorated through different activities such as holding a minute's silence, raising the Srebrenica flag, lighting prominent buildings and bridges to green and white and organising virtual memorial events. 53 MPs from the SNP, Conservatives, Labour, Liberal Democrats, Green, Plaid Cymru, DUP and the Alliance Party signed an Early Day Motion to mark the 25th anniversary.

Online commemoration events were also held in Wales, Scotland and Northern Ireland. Nicola Sturgeon, First Minister of Scotland, and Mark Drakeford, First Minister of Wales, both posted videos online to mark the 25th anniversary of the genocide. In Northern Ireland, thanks to the support of the six main political parties, a memorial tree was planted on the Stormont Estate in Belfast at a ceremony attended by Junior Ministers, Declan Kearney and Gordon Lyons, Minister for Finance, Conor Murphy and survivor Mevlida Lazibi.

During Memorial Week 2020, Remembering Srebrenica launched the Srebrenica Virtual Exhibition which has been described as the first ever virtual artistic inspired exhibition of any genocide in the world. The exhibition aimed to provide a unique perspective to the genocide in a way which personalises those stories which are so often presented as victim statistics.

==== Srebrenica Memorial Week 2021 ====
The theme for 2021's commemoration, "Rebuilding Lives", was launched on Thursday 4 February 2021 at an online launch event. The theme seeks to highlight the way in which survivors of the Bosnian genocide have rebuilt their lives. Speakers at the event included: Lord Greenhalgh, Minister for State at the Ministry for Housing, Communities and Local Government, His Excellency, Željko Komšić, Member of the Presidency of Bosnia and Herzegovina, Lisa Nandy MP, Shadow Foreign Secretary, Kirsty Williams MS, Welsh Government Minister for Education, and Peter Osborne, Chair of Remembering Srebrenica Northern Ireland.

The UK National Srebrenica Memorial Day Ceremony 2021 was broadcast on 8 July and was watched by thousands of people in both the UK and abroad. Some of the speakers who participated in the commemoration included: President Šefik Džaferović, Foreign Secretary Dominic Raab MP, First Minister of Scotland, Nicola Sturgeon MSP, First Minister of Wales, Mark Drakeford MS, First and deputy First Ministers of Northern Ireland, Paul Givan MLA and Michelle O’Neill MLA, the Grand Mufti of Bosnia, Husein Kavazović, senior faith representatives from the UK, and survivors of the genocide and ethnic cleansing. There were also performances from the renowned National Theatre of Sarajevo and prominent actors and actresses from Bosnia.

=== Lessons from Srebrenica visits programme ===
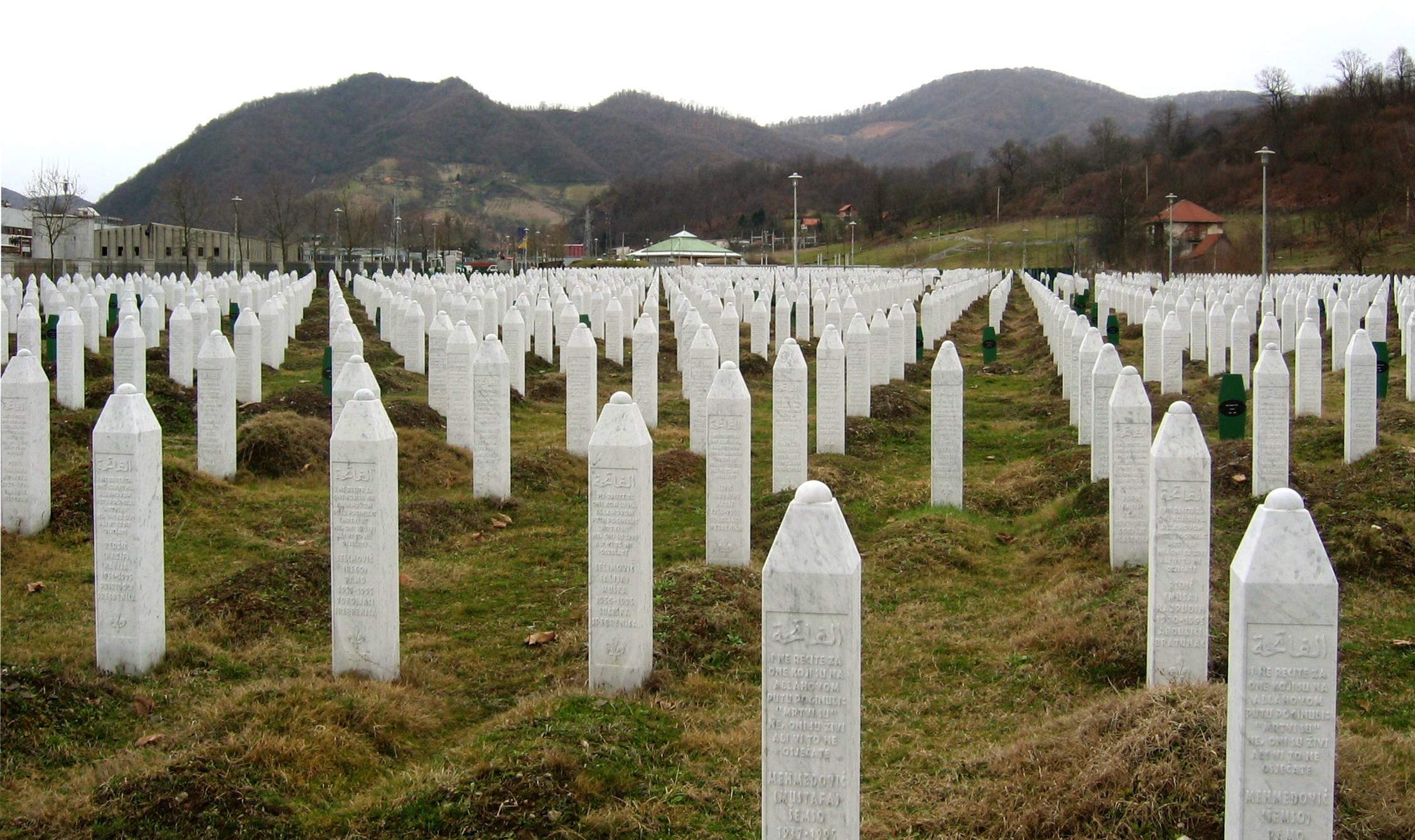
Gravestones at the Srebrenica Genocide Memorial in Potocari.

'Lessons from Srebrenica' is a flagship education programme established to help strengthen British society, with over 1,450 people taking part from the UK since 2013. These individuals come from all walks of life, all ethnicities, and all faiths or none, but have one thing in common: the desire to promote positive change within their local community by agreeing to undertake a pledge to promote community cohesion and integration. The participants play an important role in arranging memorial events and other activities across the country, working together with Remembering Srebrenica's eight English regional boards and its two country boards.

=== Education ===
Working together with schools across the UK, Remembering Srebrenica has educated over 100,000 young people about Srebrenica in the past six years. The charity provides learning resources such as lesson plans and assembly presentations to support teachers in educating both primary and secondary school pupils.

It also facilitates the 'We Are One' football tournament in schools and youth groups, which is supported by the FA, Kick it Out, the ESFA, Show Racism the Red Card and footballer Asmir Begovic.

The charity, which has organised educational visits for British schoolchildren to Bosnia and Herzegovina, has been criticised for failing to expand the programme into a two-way exchange involving Bosnian students.

=== Untold Killing Podcast ===
In 2020, Remembering Srebrenica, in partnership with Message Heard, launched a podcast series called Untold Killing which was released on all major platforms such as Apple Podcasts, Spotify and Google Podcasts. The series features exclusive survivor testimonials and expert analysis of the lead up to the genocide in Srebrenica and the unfolding of the events surrounding it. The launch of the podcast received coverage on the websites of the Spectator and The Guardian.

In May 2021 the Untold Killing Podcast won two awards at the prestigious ARIAS, winning Bronze for the ‘Impact Award’ and Silver for ‘Best Commercial Partnership’. The podcast has ranked in the top 200 podcasts in both the United Kingdom and the United States, and it has also received press from the Spectator, Guardian and the Daily Mirror in print and online as featured podcasts for the week.

=== Conflict Transformation and Srebrenica programme ===
In 2019, the charity also began the Conflict Transformation and Srebrenica programme, which is funded by the PEACE IV programme and supported by Mid and East Antrim Council in Northern Ireland. This programme teaches young leaders aged 18–25 from Mid and East Antrim about Srebrenica and helps them make links to their own communities.

== See also ==
- Srebrenica Genocide Memorial
- Srebrenica massacre
- Bosnian Genocide
